= List of archives in Canada =

This is a list of archives in Canada.

These archives, for the purposes of this list, are entities in Canada that work to acquire, preserve, and make available material as documentary evidence about a person, community, business, government, municipality, etc., for future generations. The types of archives categories—Business, Community, Cultural, Educational, Healthcare, Human Rights, Government, Military, Regional, Professional association, Religious, University/College, Sport, Arts—have been adapted from those used in the Archives Association of Ontario's Archeion. Archives that exist only in digital form are not included.

== Archives in Canada ==
Name	City	Province / Territory	Type
Altona & District Heritage Research Centre (also known as the Altona Archive)	Altona	MB	Regional
Aanischaaukamikw Cree Cultural Institute Archives	Oujé-Bougoumou	QC	Community
Acadia University Archives	Wolfville	NS	University/College
Alberni District Historical Society Archives	Port Alberni	BC	Regional
Alberta & Northwest Conference, Archives (United Church of Canada Archives)	Edmonton	AB	Religious
Alberta Health Services Records Management, Archives & Special Collections	Calgary	AB	Healthcare
Alice B. Donahue Library & Archives	Athabasca	AB	University/College
Alpine Club of Canada Library and Archives	Banff	AB	Business
Ambrose Archives, Ambrose University College	Calgary	AB	University/College
Anglican Church of Canada General Synod Archives	Toronto	ON	Religious
Anglican Church of Canada Diocese of Saskatchewan Archives	Prince Albert	SK	Religious
Anglican Diocese of New Westminster Provincial Synod of BC and Yukon	Vancouver	BC	Religious
Anglican Diocese of Nova Scotia and Prince Edward Island Archives	Halifax	NS	Religious
Anglican Diocese of Ontario, Archives (Anglican Church of Canada)	Kingston	ON	Religious
Anglican Diocese of Ontario, Archives	Ottawa	ON	Religious
Anglican Diocese of Saskatoon Archives	Saskatoon	SK	Religious
Antigonish Heritage Museum Archives	Antigonish	NS	Regional
Archdiocese of Halifax–Yarmouth Archives	Halifax	NS	Religious
Archdiocese of Regina Archives and Records	Regina	SK	Religious
Archdiocese of Winnipeg Archives & Sacramental Records	Winnipeg	MB	Religious
Archevêché de Montréal Archives de la Chancellerie	Montréal	QC	Religious
Archives Beauce	Saint-Joseph-de-Beauce	QC	Regional
Archives de Montréal	Montreal	QC	Regional
Archives de l'Assemblée nationale	Quebec	QC	Government
Archives de l'Université Laval	Laval	QC	University/College
Archives des jésuites au Canada	Montreal	QC	Religious
Archives du Barreau du Québec	Montreal	QC	Professional association
Archives du Séminaire de Québec	Québec	QC	Religious
Archives for the History of Canadian Psychiatry and Mental Health Services	Toronto	ON	Healthcare
Archives Lanark	Perth	ON	Community
Archives of Canadian Medical Physics	Kanata	ON	Healthcare
Archives of the Humboldt and District Museum & Gallery	Humboldt	SK	Regional
Archives of the Anglican Diocese of British Columbia	Victoria	BC	Religious
Archives of Manitoba	Winnipeg	MB	Government
Archives of Ontario	Toronto	ON	Government
Archives of the University of Ottawa	Ottawa	ON	University/College
Argyle Township Court House Archives	Tusket	NS	Regional
Arnprior & McNab/Braeside Archives	Arnprior	ON	Regional
Arrow Lakes Historical Society Historical Records	Nakusp	BC	Regional
Art Gallery of Ontario Library & Archives	Toronto	ON	Arts
Arts & Letters Club Library & Archives	Toronto	ON	Arts
Association of Registered Nurses of Newfoundland & Labrador - Pauline M. Laracy Archives	St. John's	NL	Healthcare
Assumption University Archives	Windsor	ON	University/College
Atlantic School of Theology Archives and Special Collections	Halifax	NS	University College
Athol Murray College of Notre Dame Archives/Museum	Wilcox	SK	Educational
Avataq Cultural Institute Documentation Centre	Westmount	QC	Cultural
Aylmer Heritage Association Archives	Aylmer	QC	Regional
B.C. Central Coast Archives	Bella Coola	BC	Regional
B.C. Conference (United Church of Canada Archives)	Vancouver	BC	Religious
B.C. Gay and Lesbian Archives	Vancouver	BC	Community
Banff Centre Paul D. Fleck Library & Archives	Banff	AB	Arts
Bank of Canada Archives	Ottawa	ON	Business
Beaton Institute, Cape Breton University	Sydney	NS	University/College
BCIT Archives	Burnaby	BC	University/College
BC History of Nursing Archives	Vancouver	BC	University/College
Bibliothèque et Archives nationales du Québec	Montreal	QC	Government
Bibliothèque municipale de Lac-Mégantic - Centre d'archives	Lac-Mégantic	QC	Regional
Bishop's University Archives	Sherbrooke	QC	University/College
Boissevain Community Archives	Boissevain	MB	Regional
Bonavista Archives	Bonavista	NL	Regional
Brant Museum Archives	Brantford	ON	Regional
Briercrest College and Seminary - Archibald Library	Caronport	SK	Educational
British Columbia Archives	Victoria	BC	Government
British Columbia Sports Hall of Fame & Museum Archives	Vancouver	BC	Sport
Brock University Special Collections and Archives	St. Catharines	ON	University/College
Brockville Museum Library of the Leeds & Grenville Branch, Ontario Genealogy Society	Brockville	ON	Regional
Bruce County Museum and Cultural Centre Archives	Southampton	ON	Regional
Burnaby Archives	Burnaby	BC	Regional
Calgary Highlanders Museum & Archives	Calgary	AB	Cultural
Calgary Police Service Interpretive Centre & Archives	Calgary	AB	Regional
Cambridge Archives and Records Centre	Cambridge	ON	Regional
Campbell River Archives Research Centre	Campbell River	BC	Regional
Canadian Association for Music Therapy / Association de musicothérapie du Canada Archives	Waterloo	ON	Arts
Canadian Baptist Archives	Hamilton	ON	Religious
Canadian Botanical Association / Association Botanique du Canada Archives	Guelph	ON	Cultural
Canadian Broadcasting Corporation (Halifax) Library	Halifax	NS	Business
Canadian Centre for Architecture (Archives)	Montréal	QC	Arts
Canadian Heritage Photography Foundation	Toronto	ON	Cultural
Canadian Institute of Geomatics Archives	Ottawa	ON	Science
Canadian Lesbian and Gay Archives	Toronto	ON	Community
Canadian Museum of History Archives	Ottawa	ON	Government
Canadian Museum of Nature Library and Archives	Ottawa	ON	Government
Canadian Pacific Archives	Calgary	AB	Business
Cannington & Area Historical Society Museum Archives	Cannington	ON	University/College
Carberry Plains Archives	Carberry	MB	Regional
Carleton County Historical Society Archives	Woodstock	NB	Regional
CARNA Museum and Archives	Edmonton	AB	Healthcare
CBC Archives	Toronto	ON	Business
Centre acadien (Université Sainte-Anne)	Pointe-de-l'Église	NS	University/College
Centre d’archives de l’arrondissement d’Outremont	Outremont	QC	Regional
Centre d’archives de la Grande Zone argileuse nord-ontarienne	Hearst	ON	University/College
Centre d'archives du Musée de la Gaspésie	Gaspé	QC	Regional
Centre d’archives Mgr-Antoine-Racine	Sherbrooke	QC	Religious
Centre d'archives régional de Charlevoix	Baie-Saint-Paul	QC	Regional
Centre d'études acadiennes Anselme-Chiasson de l'Université de Moncton	Moncton	NB	University/College
Centre de la Côte-Nord (BAnQ)	Sept-Iles	QC	Regional
Centre de la Mauricie et Centre-du-Québec (BAnQ)	Trois-Rivières	QC	Regional
Centre du Bas St-Laurent, Gaspésie-Iles-de-la-Madeleine (BAnQ)	Rimouski	QC	Regional
Centre du patrimoine - Archives	Saint-Boniface	MB	Regional
Centre for Canadian Historical Horticultural Studies	Burlington	ON	Horticultural History
Centre for Mennonite Brethren Studies	Winnipeg	MB	Religious
Centre régional d’archives de l’Outaouais	Gatineau	QC	Regional
Charlotte County Archives	St. Andrews	NB	Regional
Chase & District Museum and Archives	Chase	BC	Regional
Chatham-Kent Museum Archives	Chatham	ON	Regional
Chilliwack Archives and Research Centre	Chilliwack	BC	Regional
City of Brandon Archives	Brandon	MB	Regional
City of Calgary, Corporate Records and Archives	Calgary	AB	Regional
City of Coquitlam Archives	Coquitlam	BC	Regional
City of Edmonton Archives	Edmonton	AB	Regional
City of Greater Sudbury Archives	Sudbury	ON	Regional/Community
City of Melfort & District Museum	Melfort	SK	Regional
City of North Battleford Archives	North Battleford	SK	Regional
City of Ottawa Archives	Ottawa	ON	Regional
City of Regina Archives	Regina	SK	Regional
City of Richmond Archives	Richmond	BC	Regional
City of St John's Archives	St. John's	NL	Regional
City of Saskatoon Archives	Saskatoon	SK	Regional
City of Thunder Bay Archives and Records	Thunder Bay	ON	Regional
City of Toronto Archives	Toronto	ON	Regional
City of Vancouver Archives	Vancouver	BC	Regional
City of Vaughan Archives	Vaughan	ON	Regional
City of Victoria Archives	Victoria	BC	Regional
City of Wetaskiwin Archives	Wetaskiwin	AB	Regional
City of Winnipeg Archives & Records Control Branch	Winnipeg	MB	Regional
City of Yorkton Archives	Yorkton	SK	Regional
Clarke Museum & Archives	Orono	ON	Museum
Colchester Historeum Archives	Truro	NS	Regional
Community Archives of Belleville and Hastings County	Belleville	ON	Regional
Conference of Manitoba & Northwestern Ontario (United Church of Canada Archives)	Winnipeg	MB	Religious
Conception Bay Museum Archives	Harbour Grace	NL	Regional
Concordia University Archives	Montréal	QC	University/College
Congregation of the Most Holy Redeemer (the Redemptorists) Archives	Toronto	ON	Religious
Congregation of the Sisters of St. Joseph in Canada	London	ON	Religious
Connexions Archive & Library	Toronto	ON	Community
Costume Museum of Canada Archives	Winnipeg	MB	Arts
County of Oxford Archives	Beachville	ON	Regional
County of Prince Edward Archives	Wellington	ON	Regional
Courtenay and District Museum Archives	Courtenay	BC	Regional
Cranbrook Archives, Museum and Landmark Foundation	Cranbrook	BC	Community
Cumberland Museum and Archives	Cumberland	BC	Community
Cumberland County Museum and Archives	Amherst	NS	Community
Dawson City Museum Klondike History Library and Archives	Dawson	YT	Museum
Dalhousie University Archives	Halifax	NS	University/College
Delta Museum and Archives	Delta	BC	Regional
Dene Nation Library and Archives	Yellowknife	NT	Regional
Département des archives (Société d’histoire de Sherbrooke)	Sherbrooke	QC	Regional
Deseronto Archives	Deseronto	ON	Regional
Diocesan Archives, Anglican Diocese of Fredericton (Anglican Church of Canada)	Fredericton	NB	Religious
Diocesan Synod of Western Newfoundland, Archives (Anglican Church of Canada)	Corner Brook	NL	Religious
Diocese of Algoma Archives	Sault Ste. Marie	ON	Religious
Diocese of Brandon, Archives (Anglican Church of Canada)	Brandon	MB	Religious
Diocese of Caledonia, Archives (Anglican Church of Canada)	Prince Rupert	BC	Religious
Diocese of Eastern Newfoundland & Labrador, Archives (Anglican Church of Canada)	St. John's	NL	Religious
Diocese of Huron Archives	London	ON	Religious
Diocese of Keewatin, Archives (Anglican Church of Canada)	Keewatin	ON	Religious
Diocese of Kootenay Archives	Kelowna	BC	Religious
Diocese of London Archives	London	ON	Religious
Diocese of Montréal, Archives (Anglican Church of Canada)	Montréal	QC	Religious
Diocese of Moosonee, Archives (Anglican Church of Canada)	Sudbury	ON	Religious
Diocese of New Westminster, Archives (Anglican Church of Canada)	Vancouver	BC	Religious
Diocese of Niagara, Archives (Anglican Church of Canada)	Hamilton	ON	Religious
Diocese of Ottawa Archives	Ottawa	ON	Religious
Diocese of Qu'Appelle Archives	Regina	SK	Religious
Diocese of Quebec, Archives (Anglican Church of Canada)	Sherbrooke	QC	Religious
Diocese of Rupert’s Land Archives	Winnipeg	MB	Religious
Diocese of Toronto Archives	Toronto	ON	Religious
Diocese of Toronto, St James’ Cathedral Archives	Toronto	ON	Religious
Doon Heritage Crossroads	Kitchener	ON	Regional
Division des Archives (Université Laval)	Québec	QC	University/College
Douglas College Archives	New Westminster	BC	University/College
Duck Lake Historical Museum Archives	Duck Lake	SK	Regional
Dufferin County Museum and Archives	Orangeville	ON	Regional
Eastern Irrigation District Archives & Library	Brooks	AB	Regional
Eastern Shore Archives	Lake Charlotte	NS	Regional
Eastern Townships Resource Centre Archives	Sherbrooke	QC	Regional
École de technologie supérieure - Service des archives	Montreal	QC	University/College
École des hautes études commerciales de Montréal (HEC) - Service de la gestion des documents et des archives	Montreal	QC	University/College
École Polytechnique de Montréal - Bureau des archives	Montreal	QC	University/College
Edmonton Public Schools Archives and Museum	Edmonton	AB	Community
Edson & District Public Library Archives	Edson	AB	Regional
Elgin County Archives	St. Thomas	ON	Regional
Emily Carr University of Art and Design	Vancouver	BC	University/College
Enderby & District Museum & Archives	Enderby	BC	Regional
Engracia de Jesus Matias Archives and Special Collections	Sault Ste. Marie	ON	University/College
Esplanade Arts & Heritage Centre Archives	Medicine Hat	AB	Arts
Esquesing Historical Society Archives	Georgetown	ON	Regional
Esquimalt Archives	Esquimalt	BC	Regional
Etobicoke Historical Society Archives	Toronto	ON	Regional
Evangelical Lutheran Church in Canada Eastern Synod, Archives	Waterloo	ON	Religious
Exhibition Place Records & Archives	Toronto	ON	Business
Exploration Place Archives	Prince George	BC	Regional
Faculty of Medicine Founders' Archive	St. John's	NL	University/College
Fire Fighters Historical Society of Winnipeg Archives	Winnipeg	MB	Regional
Folklore & Language Archive (Memorial University of Newfoundland)	St. John's	NL	University/College
Fonds Ancien, Bibliothèque du Séminaire de Québec (Musée de la Civilisation)	Québec	QC	Religious
Fort Garry Horse Museum & Archives	Winnipeg	MB	Military
Fort Henry Museum Archives	Kingston	ON	Regional
Fort Steele Heritage Town Archives	Fort Steele	BC	Regional
Fortress of Louisbourg Library (Parks Canada - Atlantic Service Centre Library)	Louisbourg	NS	Regional
Frères de St Gabriel, Province de Montréal	Montréal	QC	Religious
Gabriel Dumont Institute Archives	Saskatoon	SK	Community
Gabriola Museum Archives	Gabriola	ON	Community
Galt Museum & Archives	Lethbridge	AB	Regional
Glenbow - Alberta Institute/Glenbow Museum Library & Archives	Calgary	AB	Regional
Greater Vernon Museum and Archives	Vernon	BC	Regional
George Brown College Archives	Toronto	ON	University/College
Grace Schmidt Room of Local History	Kitchener	ON	Regional
Grand Lodge of Manitoba Masonic Archives	Winnipeg	MB	Community
Grey Roots Museum and Archives	Georgian Bluffs	ON	Regional
Georgina Pioneer Village & Archives	Keswick	ON	Regional
Grenville County Historical Society Archival Resource Centre	Prescott	ON	Regional
Grey Sisters of the Immaculate Conception Marguerite Centre Archives	Pembroke	ON	Religious
Guelph Museums Archives	Guelph	ON	Regional
Haldimand County Museum & Archives	Cayuga	ON	Regional
Haliburton Highlands Museum Archives	Haliburton	ON	Regional
Halifax Municipal Archives	Halifax	NS	Regional
Halton Region Museum Library & Archives	Milton	ON	Regional
Hamilton Public Library Local History & Archives Department	Hamilton	ON	Regional
Hazelton Pioneer Museum & Archives	Hazelton	BC	Community
Henri J.M. Nouwen Archives & Research Collection	Toronto	ON	University/College
Heritage North Museum Archives	Thompson	MB	Regional
Historical Society of Ottawa, Bytown Museum Archives	Ottawa	ON	Regional
Hockey Hall of Fame Resource Centre	Toronto	ON	Sport
Holy Blossom Temple Archives	Toronto	ON	Religious
Hospital for Sick Children Hospital Library and Archives	Toronto	ON	Healthcare
Huronia Museum Library and Archives	Midland	ON	Regional
Hudson Bay's Company Archives	Winnipeg	MB	Business
Institute of the Blessed Virgin Mary in North America (Loretto Sisters) Archives	Toronto	ON	Religious
International Civil Aviation Organization Web, Library & Archives Section	Montréal	QC	Science
Irma and Marvin Penn Archives of the Jewish Heritage Centre of Western Canada	Winnipeg	MB	Religious
Jasper Yellowhead Museum and Archives	Jasper	AB	Regional
Jesuits in English Canada Archives	Toronto	ON	Religious
Jewish Archives and Historical Society of Edmonton and Northern Alberta	Edmonton	AB	Religious
Jewish Historical Society of BC Archives	Vancouver	BC	Religious
Jewish Museum & Archives of BC	Vancouver	BC	Religious
Jewish Public Library Archives	Montreal	QC	Religious
Joseph Brant Museum Archives	Burlington	ON	Regional
Kaatza Historical Society Kaatza Station Museum & Archives	Lake Cowichan	BC	Regional
Kamloops Museum and Archives	Kamloops	BC	Regional
Kelly Library Archival and Manuscript Collections	Toronto	ON	University/College
Kelowna Public Archives	Kelowna	BC	Regional
King's-Edgehill School Archives	Windsor	NS	Educational
Kings County Museum Photo Archives	Kentville	NS	Regional
Kitchener City Archives	Kitchener	ON	Regional
Kitimat Museum and Archives	Kitimat	BC	Regional
Klondike History Library & Archives	Dawson City	YT	Regional
Kluane First Nation Archives	Burwash Landing	BC	Community
Kootenay Lake Historical Society Archives	Kaslo	BC	Regional
Lakehead University Library Archives	Thunder Bay	ON	University/College
Langley Centennial Museum Archives	Fort Langley	BC	Regional
Laurentian University Archives	Sudbury	ON	University/College
Laurier Archives	Waterloo	ON	University/College
Law Society of Upper Canada Archives	Toronto	ON	Professional association
Legal Archives Society of Alberta Archives	Calgary	AB	Professional association
Lennox & Addington County Museum & Archives	Napanee	ON	Regional
Lennoxville-Ascot Historical & Museum Society Archives	Lennoxville	QC	Regional
Library and Archives Canada	Ottawa	ON	Government
Listowel & Area Division (Stratford-Perth Archives)	Listowel	ON	Regional
Lithuanian Museum-Archives of Canada	Mississauga	ON	Community
Lloydminster Regional Archives	Lloydminster	SK	Regional
London Room	London	ON	Regional
Lord Strathcona's Horse Regimental Museum Archives	Calgary	AB	Military
Lutheran Historical Institute Archives and Library	Edmonton	AB	Religious
Lytton Museum and Archives	Lytton	BC	Regional
Macdonald Museum Archives	Middleton	NS	Regional
Madonna House Archives	Combermere	ON	Religious
Malinsky Memorial Archives	St. Catharines	ON	Religious
Manitoba Museum Library & Archives	Winnipeg	MB	Regional
Mariposa Folk Foundation Archives	Orillia	ON	Arts
Maritime Conference Archives	Sackville	NB	Religious
Marsh Collection Society A Community History & Genealogy Centre	Amherstburg	ON	Regional
McCord Museum Archives & Documentation Centre/Centre d’archives et de documentation	Montréal	QC	Regional
McGill University Archives	Montreal	QC	University/College
McMaster University William Ready Division of Archives and Research Collections	Hamilton	ON	University/College
McMichael Canadian Art Collection Library/Archives	Kleinburg	ON	Arts
Memorial University of Newfoundland Folklore and Language Archive	St. John's	NL	University/College
Mennonite Archives of Ontario	Waterloo	ON	University/College
Mennonite Heritage Centre Archives	Winnipeg	MB	Religious
Mennonite Heritage Village Archives	Steinbach	MB	Regional
Mennonite Historical Society of Saskatchewan Archives	Saskatoon	SK	Religious
Michener House Museum and Archives	Lacombe	AB	Regional
Millet and District Museum, Archives and Visitor Information Centre	Millet	AB	Regional
Military History Research Centre George Metcalf Archival Collection	Ottawa	ON	Military
Minnedosa Regional Archives	Minnedosa	MB	Regional
Mission Community Archives	Mission	BC	Regional
Missisquoi Historical Society Archives	Stanbridge East	QC	Regional
Mitchell Division (Stratford-Perth Archives)	Mitchell	ON	Regional
Muslims in Canada Archive	Toronto	ON	Religious/Community
Moose Jaw Public Library Archives	Moose Jaw	SK	Regional
Mount Allison University Archives	Sackville	NB	University/College
Mount Royal University Archives and Special Collections	Calgary	AB	University/College
Mount Saint Vincent University Archives	Halifax	NS	University/College
Mountain View Museum - Olds Historical Society Archives	Olds	AB	Regional
Multicultural Heritage Centre Archives	Stony Plain	AB	Regional
Museum London Art Resource Centre	London	ON	Arts
Nanaimo Archives	Nanaimo	BC	Regional
Nanaimo District Museum	Nanaimo	BC	Regional
National Ballet of Canada Archives	Toronto	ON	Arts
National Office - General Synod Archives (Anglican Church of Canada)	Toronto	ON	Religious
Nature Canada Library and Archives	Ottawa	ON	Science
Naval Marine Archive	Picton	ON	Community
Nelson & District Museum, Art Gallery, Archives & Historical Society Archives	Nelson	BC	Regional
New Brunswick Museum Archives & Research Library	Saint John	NB	Regional
New Westminster Archives	New Westminster	BC	University/College
Newfoundland & Labrador Conference, Archives (United Church of Canada Archives)	St. John's	NL	Religious
Nicola Tribal Association Archives	Merritt	BC	Cultural
Nicola Valley Museum and Archives	Merritt	BC	Regional
Nipissing University and Canadore College Archives and Special Collections	North Bay	ON	University/College
Norfolk Heritage Centre	Simcoe	ON	Regional
North American Black Historical Museum Archives	Amherstburg	ON	Human Rights
North Battleford City Archives	North Battleford	SK	Regional
Northside Hip-Hop Archive	Toronto	ON	Cultural
North Shore Archives	Tatamagouche	NS	Community
North Vancouver Museum and Archives	North Vancouver	BC	Regional
Northern BC Archives and Special Collections	Prince George	BC	University/College
Northwestern Ontario Sports Hall of Fame Archives	Thunder Bay	ON	Sport
Norwich and District Museum and Archives	Norwich	ON	Regional
Notman Photographic Archives	Montreal	QC	University/College
Nova Scotia Archives	Halifax	NS	Government
Nunatta Sunakkutangit Museum	Iqaluit	NU	Regional
Nunavut Archives Program	Iqaluat	NU	Government
NWT Archives	Yellowknife	NT	Government
OCAD University Archives	Toronto	ON	University/College
Oil Museum of Canada	Oil Springs	ON	Business
Okotoks Museum and Archives	Okotoks	AB	Regional
Ontario Electric Railway Historical Association Archives	Milton	ON	Science
Ontario Jewish Archives	Toronto	ON	Religious
Orra Sheldon Resource Centre (Anglican Church of Canada)	Prince Albert	SK	Religious
Oshawa Community Museum and Archives	Oshawa	ON	Community
Ottawa Jewish Archives	Ottawa	ON	Religious
Oxford County Archives	Woodstock	ON	Regional
Peace River Museum, Archives & Mackenzie Centre	Peace River	AB	Regional
Peel Art Gallery, Museum and Archives	Brampton	ON	Regional
Penetanguishene Centennial Museum & Archives	Penetanguishene	ON	Regional
Penticton Museum and Archives	Penticton	BC	Regional
Peterborough Museum & Archives	Peterborough	ON	Regional
Pier 21 Scotiabank Family History Centre	Halifax	NS	Cultural
Pitt Meadows Museum and Archives	Pitt Meadows	BC	Community
Port Hope Archives	Port Hope	ON	Regional
Presbyterian Church in Canada Archives	Toronto	ON	Religious
Presentation Congregation Archives	St. John's	NL	Religious
Prince Albert Historical Society/Museum Archives	Prince Albert	SK	Regional
Prince Rupert City & Regional Archives	Prince Rupert	BC	Regional
Provincial Archives of Alberta	Edmonton	AB	Government
Provincial Archives of New Brunswick	Fredericton	NB	Government
Provincial Archives of Newfoundland and Labrador	St. John's	NL	Government
Prince Edward Island Public Archives and Records Office	Charlottetown	PEI	Government
Quebec Diocesan Archives	Lennoxville	QC	Religious
Quebec Gay Archives	Montreal	QC	Community
Queen's College Archives	St. John's	NL	University/College
Queen's Own Rifles of Canada Regimental Museum Archives	Toronto	ON	Military
Queen's University Archives	Kingston	ON	University/College
Quesnel & District Museum and Archives	Quesnel	BC	Regional
Quinte Educational Museum & Archives	Ameliasburg	ON	Regional
Reach Gallery Museum Abbotsford Archives	Abbotsford	BC	Regional
Redcliff Museum and Historical Society	Redcliff	AB	Community
Red Deer & District Archives	Red Deer	AB	Regional
Regina Qu'Appelle Health Region Archives	Regina	SK	Healthcare
Region of Waterloo Archives	Kitchener	ON	Regional
Revelstoke Museum & Archives	Revelstoke	BC	Regional
Roman Catholic Archdiocese of Kingston Archives	Kingston	ON	Religious
Roman Catholic Archdiocese of Regina Archives	Regina	SK	Religious
Roman Catholic Diocese of Nelson Archives	Nelson	BC	Religious
Roman Catholic Diocese of Prince Albert Archives	Prince Albert	SK	Religious
Roman Catholic Diocese of Saskatoon Archives	Saskatoon	SK	Religious
Rossland Historical Museum & Archives Association (Rossland Museum & Discovery Centre)	Rossland	BC	Regional
Royal Canadian Regiment Museum Archives	London	ON	Military
Royal Ontario Museum Archives	Toronto	ON	Arts
Royal Roads University Archives	Victoria	BC	University/College
Ryerson Archives & Special Collections	Toronto	ON	University/College
S. J. McKee Archives	Brandon	MB	University/College
Saanich Archives	Saanich	BC	Regional
Saskatchewan Archives Board, Saskatoon Office	Saskatoon	SK	Regional
Saskatoon Public Library Local History Room	Saskatoon	SK	Regional
Saint Francis Xavier University Archives	Antigonish	NS	University/College
Saint John Jewish Historical Museum Library & Archive	Saint John	NB	Religious
Saint Mary's University Archives	Halifax	NS	University/College
Saint Paul University Archives	Ottawa	ON	University/College
Salvation Army - George Scott Railton Heritage Centre	Toronto	ON	Religious
Saskatchewan Archives Board	Regina and Saskatoon	SK	Government
Saskatchewan Synod, Archives (Evangelical Lutheran Church in Canada)	Saskatoon	SK	Religious
Sedgewick Archives Gallery & Museum	Sedgewick	AB	Community
Service des archives du Collège universitaire de Saint-Boniface	Winnipeg	MB	University/College
Service des archives et des collections (Université du Québec à Trois-Rivières)	Trois-Rivières	QC	University/College
Service des archives du séminaire de Sherbrooke (Séminaire de Sherbrooke)	Sherbrooke	QC	Religious
Scotiabank Archives	Toronto	ON	Business
Scugog Shores Heritage Centre and Archives	Port Perry	ON	Community
Sculptors Society of Canada Archives	Richmond Hill	ON	Arts
Shambhala Archives	Halifax	NS	Religious
Shearwater Aviation Museum Library & Archives	Shearwater	NS	Regional
Shelburne County Museum Archives	Shelburne	NS	Regional
Shingwauk Residential Schools Centre	Sault Ste. Marie	ON	Community/Cultural
Sidney Museum and Archives	Sidney	BC	Regional
Simcoe County Archives	Minesing	ON	Regional
Simon Fraser University Archives and Records Management	Burnaby	BC	University/College
Sisters of Charity – Halifax Congressional Archives	Halifax	NS	Religious
Sisters of St. Ann Archives	Victoria	BC	Religious
Sisters of St. Joseph of Toronto Archives	Toronto	ON	Religious
Sisters of Mission Service	Saskatoon	SK	Religious
Sisters of Providence of St. Vincent de Paul Archives & Library	Kingston	ON	Religious
Sodbusters Archives Museum	Strome	AB	Community
Sooke Region Museum Archives	Sooke	BC	Regional
South Peace Regional Archives	Grande Prairie	AB	Regional
Sport Archives of Newfoundland and Labrador	St. John's	NL	Sport
St Mary's Museum / Le Musée Sainte Marie Archives	Church Point	NS	Regional
St. Michael's Museum & Genealogical Centre	Miramichi	NB	Regional
St. Jerome's University Archives	Waterloo	ON	University/College
St. Joseph Region Archives of the Religious Hospitallers of St. Joseph	Kingston	ON	Religious
St. Thomas More College Archives	Saskatoon	SK	University/College
Stratford-Perth Archives	Stratford	ON	Regional
Summerland Museum & Heritage Society Archives	Summerland	BC	Regional
Sunshine Coast Museum and Archives	Gibsons	BC	Regional
Surrey Archives	Surrey	BC	Regional
Tartu Institute Archives	Toronto	ON	Cultural
Teslin Tlingit Council Archival Collection	Teslin	YT	Community
Them Days Labrador Archives	Happy Valley-Goose Bay	NL	Regional
Thomas A. Edge Archives & Special Collections (Athabasca University)	Athabasca	AB	University/College
Thornhill Archives	Thornhill	ON	Community
Thunder Bay Museum Archives	Thunder Bay	ON	Community
Todmorden Mills Heritage Museum & Art Centre Archives	Toronto	ON	Regional
Toronto Port Authority Archives	Toronto	ON	Regional
Toronto Public Library Archival Collections	Toronto	ON	Regional
Touchstones Nelson Archives	Nelson	BC	Regional
Town of Ajax Archives	Ajax	ON	Regional
Trail City Archives	Trail	BC	Regional
Trent University Archives	Peterborough	ON	University/College
Trent Valley Archives	Peterborough	ON	Regional
Trinity College Archives	Toronto	ON	University/College
Trinity Western University Archives and Special Collections	Langley	BC	University/College
Trondek Hwechin Archives	Dawson City	YT	Community
Tsi Ronterihwanonhnha ne Kanienkeha / Kanehsatake Resource Centre	Oka	QC	Regional
Tyndale University College & Seminary Archives	Toronto	ON	University/College
Tweed & Area Heritage Centre Library & Archives	Tweed	ON	Regional
Ukrainian Canadian Archives & Museum of Alberta	Edmonton	AB	Community
Ukrainian Catholic Church Archeparchial Archives	Winnipeg	MB	Religious
Université de Montréal - Division de la gestion de documents et des archives	Montreal	QC	University/College
Université du Québec à Montréal - Service des archives et de gestion des documents	Montreal	QC	University/College
University College of the North Archives	Thompson	MB	University/College
University Health Network Archives	Toronto	ON	Healthcare
University of British Columbia Archives	Vancouver	BC	University/College
University of Calgary Archives	Calgary	AB	University/College
University of Guelph Archival & Special Collections	Guelph	ON	University/College
University of King's College Archives	Halifax	NS	University/College
University of Manitoba Archives & Special Collections	Winnipeg	MB	University/College
University of New Brunswick Archives & Special Collections	Fredericton	NB	University/College
University of Ottawa Archives and Special Collections	Ottawa	ON	University/College
University of Regina Archives and Special Collections	Regina	SK	University/College
University of St. Michael's College Archives	Toronto	ON	University/College
University of Saskatchewan Archives and Special Collections	Saskatoon	SK	University/College
University of Toronto Archives and Records Management Services	Toronto	ON	University/College
University of Toronto Mississauga Archives	Toronto	ON	University/College
University of Toronto Scarborough Library, Archives & Special Collections	Toronto	ON	University/College
Thomas Fisher Rare Book Library (University of Toronto)	Toronto	ON	University/College
Trinity College Archives (University of Toronto)	Toronto	ON	University/College
University College Archives (University of Toronto)	Toronto	ON	University/College
University of Victoria Archives and Special Collections	Victoria	BC	University/College
University of Waterloo Special Collections & Archives	Waterloo	ON	University/College
United Church of Canada Archives	Toronto	ON	Religious
Ontario Tech University Library Archives	North Oshawa	ON	University/College
University of Winnipeg Archives and Records Centre	Winnipeg	MB	University/College
Upper Canada College Archives	Toronto	ON	University/College
Upper Canada Village Reference Library & Archives	Morrisburg	ON	Regional
Ursuline Sisters of Bruno Archives	Humboldt	SK	Religious
Ursuline Sisters of Prelate Archives	Saskatoon	SK	Religious
Uxbridge Historical Centre Archives	Uxbridge	ON	Regional
Vancouver Holocaust Education Centre Archives	Vancouver	BC	Human Rights
Victoria University Archives	Toronto	ON	University/College
Ville de Gatineau - Section de la gestion des documents et des archives	Gatineau	QC	Regional
Ville de Lévis - Secteur des archives privées	Lévis	QC	Regional
Ville de Québec - Service du greffe et des archives	Québec City	QC	Regional
Waterford & Townsend Historical Society Archives	Waterford	ON	Regional
Wellington County Museum and Archives	Guelph	ON	Regional
West Hants Historical Society Genealogies	Windsor	NS	Regional
West Vancouver Archives	West Vancouver	BC	Regional
Western Québec School Board Archives	Gatineau	QC	Regional
Whistler Museum Archive Collection	Whistler	BC	Regional
White Rock Museum and Archives	White Rock	BC	Regional
Whitby Archives	Whitby	ON	Regional
Windsor Community Archives	Windsor	ON	Regional
Yarmouth County Museum & Archives	Yarmouth	NS	Regional
York University Clara Thomas Archives & Special Collections	Toronto	ON	University/College
Yukon Archives	Whitehorse	YT	Government
Musée d’art contemporain de Montréal Archives des collections	Montréal	QC	Arts
Vidéographe inc Service des archives	Montréal	QC	Arts
Robert McLaughlin Gallery Library & Archives	Oshawa	ON	Arts
Stephen Leacock Museum/Archives	Orillia	ON	Arts
Stratford Shakespeare Festival Archives	Stratford	ON	Arts
Vancouver Ballet Society Archives	Vancouver	BC	Arts
Museum & Archive of Games	Waterloo	ON	Arts
Schneider Corporation Archives	Kitchener	ON	Business
Toronto-Dominion Bank, Archives Department	Toronto	ON	Business
Sanofi Pasteur Limited Balmer Neilly Library & Archives	Toronto	ON	Business / Healthcare
Japanese Canadian National Museum Archives	Burnaby	BC	Cultural
Secwepemc Cultural Education Society Archives	Kamloops	BC	Cultural
Montgomery’s Inn Museum Resource Centre	Toronto	ON	Cultural
Manitoba Council (Girl Guides of Canada)	Winnipeg	MB	Cultural
Manitoba Gay/Lesbian Archive	Winnipeg	MB	Cultural
Fondation Lionel-Groulx Centre de recherche	Outremont	QC	Educational
Commission scolaire des Affluents, Affaires corporatives et gestion de l’information Centre de gestion des documents et d’archives	Repentigny	QC	Educational
Commission scolaire des Laurentides Gestion documentaire et archives	Sainte-Agathe-des-Monts	QC	Educational
Commission scolaire de l’Énergie Archives	Shawnigan	QC	Educational
Commission scolaire de la Région-de-Sherbrooke Archives	Sherbrooke	QC	Educational
King Louis XIV Memorial Archives Fealty Heritage Centre	Toronto	ON	Educational
Toronto District School Board Sesquicentennial Museum & Archives	Toronto	ON	Educational
Toronto Catholic District School Board Archives	Toronto	ON	Educational / Religious
St. Mary's General Hospital (Kitchener) Archives	Kitchener	ON	Healthcare
Royal College of Physicians & Surgeons of Canada Roddick Reading Room & Archives	Ottawa	ON	Healthcare
Centre for Addiction & Mental Health Library & Archives	Toronto	ON	Healthcare
British Columbia Medical Association Medical Archives & Museum	Vancouver	BC	Healthcare
St. John's Rehabilitation Hospital Archives	Toronto	ON	Healthcare
St. Joseph's Health Centre (Toronto) Archives	Toronto	ON	Healthcare
West Park Healthcare Centre Archives	Toronto	ON	Healthcare
Montréal Holocaust Memorial Centre	Montréal	QC	Human Rights
26th Field Regiment RCA/12th Manitoba Dragoons Museum Archives	Brandon	MB	Military
Musée du Royal 22e Régiment / Museum of the Royal 22nd Regiment Archives	Québec	QC	Military
Sault Ste Marie & 49th Field Regiment RCA Historical Society Archives	Sault Ste Marie	ON	Military
Queen's York Rangers (1st American Regiment) Museum Archives	Toronto	ON	Military
Western Canada Aviation Museum Library/Archives	Winnipeg	MB	Museum
Matsqui-Sumas-Abbotsford Museum Archives	Abbotsford	BC	Regional
U’Mista Cultural Centre Archives	Alert Bay	BC	Regional
Société d’histoire du Lac-Saint-Jean Archives	Alma	QC	Regional
Société d’histoire d’Amos	Amos	QC	Regional
Ashcroft Museum Archives	Ashcroft	BC	Regional
Aylmer & District Museum Association Archives	Aylmer	ON	Regional
Société historique de la Côte-Nord Archives	Baie-Comeau	QC	Regional
Whyte Museum of the Canadian Rockies Archives & Library	Banff	AB	Regional
Barkerville Historic Town Library & Archives	Barkerville	BC	Regional
Parkdale-Maplewood Community Museum Archives	Barss Corner	NS	Regional
Bayfield Archives Room	Bayfield	ON	Regional
Magnacca Research Centre Archives	Brandon	MB	Regional
Smith Ennismore Historical Society Heritage Learning Centre	Bridgenorth	ON	Regional
DesBrisay Museum Archives	Bridgewater	NS	Regional
Société d’histoire de la Seigneurie de Chambly	Chambly	QC	Regional
Centre de Saguenay-Lac-St-Jean (Bibliothèque et Archives nationales du Québec)	Chicoutimi	QC	Regional
Société historique du Saguenay Archives	Chicoutimi	QC	Regional
Black Cultural Centre for Nova Scotia Library	Dartmouth	NS	Regional
Cole Harbour Rural Heritage Society Archives	Dartmouth	NS	Regional
Dartmouth Heritage Museum	Dartmouth	NS	Regional
Delhi Tobacco Museum & Heritage Centre	Delhi	ON	Regional
Teeterville Pioneer Museum Archives	Delhi	ON	Regional
Cowichan Valley Museum & Archives	Duncan	BC	Regional
Fort Frances Museum & Cultural Centre	Fort Frances	ON	Regional
North Peace Historical Society Archives	Fort St. John	BC	Regional
Huron County Museum & County Gaol	Goderich	ON	Regional
Société d’histoire de la Haute-Yamaska Centre d’archives de la Haute-Yamaska	Granby	QC	Regional
Grand Manan Museum Archives	Grand Manan	NB	Regional
Gravenhurst Archives	Gravenhurst	ON	Regional
Roman Catholic Diocese of Hamilton Library & Archives	Hamilton	ON	Regional
King’s County Museum, King’s County Historical & Archival Society, Inc.	Hampton	NB	Regional
Kilby Store & Farm Library & Archives	Harrison Mills	BC	Regional
'Ksan Historical Village & Museum Library & Archives	Hazelton	BC	Regional
Commission scolaire de la Jonquière Centre de gestion des documents	Jonquière	QC	Regional
Service de gestion des documents et des archives (Cégep de Jonquière)	Jonquière	QC	Regional
Lake of the Woods Museum Archives	Kenora	ON	Regional
Marine Museum of the Great Lakes Audrey Rushbrook Memorial Library & Archives	Kingston	ON	Regional
Société historique de la Côte-du-Sud Département des archives	La Pocatière	QC	Regional
Société d’histoire de La Prairie de la Magdeleine Archives	La Prairie	QC	Regional
Société d’histoire et de généalogie de l’Ile Jésus	Laval	QC	Regional
Sir Alexander Galt Museum & Archives	Lethbridge	AB	Regional
Thomas Raddall Research Centre	Liverpool	NS	Regional
J.J. Talman Regional Collection	London	ON	Regional
Société d’histoire du Lac Memphrémagog Archives	Magog	QC	Regional
Centre de Montréal, Laval, Laurentides, Lanaudière, Montérégie (Bibliothèque et Archives nationales du Québec)	Montréal	QC	Regional
Société d’histoire d’Oka Archives	Oka	QC	Regional
Canadian Women's Movement Archives / Archives canadiennes du mouvement des femmes	Ottawa	ON	Regional
Montréal Arrondissement Pierrefonds / Senneville Archives	Pierrefonds	QC	Regional
Centrale des syndicats du Québec Centre de documentation	Québec	QC	Regional
Société d’histoire de Sainte-Foy	Québec	QC	Regional
Société d’histoire du Haut-Richelieu Archives	Saint-Jean-sur-Richelieu	QC	Regional
Centre de l’Estrie (Bibliothèque et Archives nationales du Québec)	Sherbrooke	QC	Regional
Société historique Pierre-de-Saurel inc Archives	Sorel-Tracy	QC	Regional
Musée Héritage Museum, Archives & Library	St. Albert	AB	Regional
St. Catharines Museum at Lock 3 Library/Archives	St. Catharines	ON	Regional
Maritime History Archive (Memorial University of Newfoundland)	St. John's	NL	Regional
Ville de Trois-Rivières Centre des archives	Trois-Rivières	QC	Regional
Glengarry Historical Society Archives	Williamstown	ON	Regional
Centre de documentation et d’études Madawaskayennes	Edmundston	NB	Regional
Port de Montréal Gestion de documents	Montréal	QC	Regional
Stanstead Historical Society / Société historique de Stanstead Archives	Stanstead	QC	Regional
Société des archives historiques de la région de l’Amiante Archives	Thetford Mines	QC	Regional
Scarborough Historical Society Scarborough Archives	Toronto	ON	Regional
Trinity Historical Society Archives	Trinity	NL	Regional
Osgoode Township Historical Society Archives	Vernon	ON	Regional
Transcona Historical Museum Archives	Winnipeg	MB	Regional
Northwest Territories Archives, Dept. of Education, Culture & Employment (Province of Northwest Territories)	Yellowknife	NT	Regional
Sanctuaire Notre-Dame du Cap Archives	Cap-de-la-Madeleine	QC	Religious
Séminaire de Chicoutimi Archives	Chicoutimi	QC	Religious
Religious Hospitallers of St. Joseph, St Joseph Province Archives	Kingston	ON	Religious
Montréal & Ottawa Conference Archives - Quebec-Sherbrooke Presbytery (Eastern Townships) (United Church of Canada Archives)	Lennoxville	QC	Religious
Soeurs des Saints Noms de Jésus et de Marie, Longueuil Archives	Longueuil	QC	Religious
Pentecostal Assemblies of Canada Archives	Mississauga	ON	Religious
Oblats de Marie Immaculée, Montréal Archives	Montréal	QC	Religious
Oratoire St-Joseph Bibliothèque Ste-Croix	Montréal	QC	Religious
Soeurs Grises de Montréal Archives	Montréal	QC	Religious
Les Soeurs de l’Assomption de la Sainte-Vierge Archives	Nicolet	QC	Religious
Séminaire de Nicolet Archives	Nicolet	QC	Religious
Centre de recherche en histoire religieuse du Canada / Research Centre in Religious History of Canada	Ottawa	ON	Religious
Montréal & Ottawa Conference Archives - Ottawa & Seaway Valley Presbyteries (United Church of Canada Archives)	Ottawa	ON	Religious
Roman Catholic Archdiocese of Ottawa / Corporation Episcopale Catholique Romaine d’Ottawa Archives	Ottawa	ON	Religious
Soeurs du Sacré-Coeur de Jésus, Saint-Hubert Archives	Ottawa	ON	Religious
Pères Eudistes Archives provinciales	Québec	QC	Religious
Religieux de St-Vincent-de-Paul (Canada) Archives	Québec	QC	Religious
Soeurs de Saint-Joseph-de-Saint-Vallier, Québec Archives	Québec	QC	Religious
Soeurs Servantes du Saint-Coeur-de-Marie, Québec Archives	Québec	QC	Religious
Soeurs Ursulines de Québec Archives	Québec	QC	Religious
La Compagnie de Jésus Bibliothèque, Maison des Jésuites	Saint-Jérome	QC	Religious
Montréal & Ottawa Conference Archives - Quebec-Sherbrooke Presbytery (United Church of Canada Archives)	Sherbrooke	QC	Religious
Roman Catholic Archdiocese of St John’s Episcopal Archive	St. John's	NL	Religious
Montréal & Ottawa Conference Archives - Montréal, Lauren & Ottawa Presbyteries (United Church of Canada Archives)	Montréal	QC	Religious
Reuben & Helene Dennis Museum (Beth Tzedec Congregation)	Toronto	ON	Religious
Roman Catholic Archdiocese of Toronto Archives	Toronto	ON	Religious
Sisters Servants of Mary Immaculate Community Archives	Toronto	ON	Religious
Séminaire St-Joseph Service des archives	Trois-Rivières	QC	Religious
Service des archives (Séminaire St-Joseph)	Trois-Rivières	QC	Religious
Soeurs Ursulines, Trois-Rivières Archives	Trois-Rivières	QC	Religious
Roman Catholic Archdiocese of Vancouver Archives	Vancouver	BC	Religious
Alexander Graham Bell National Historic Site Archives	Baddeck	NS	Science
International Hockey Hall of Fame & Museum Archives	Kingston	ON	Sport
Canadian Ski Museum Archives	Ottawa	ON	Sport
Royal Canadian Yacht Club Archives	Toronto	ON	Sport
Nova Scotia Sport Hall of Fame Archives	Halifax	NS	Sport
Royal Canadian Golf Association Library & Archives	Oakville	ON	Sport
University of Calgary Canadian Architectural Archives	Calgary	AB	University/College
Selkirk College Archives	Castlegar	BC	University/College
University of Prince Edward Island Archives	Charlottetown	PEI	University/College
University of Alberta Archives	Edmonton	AB	University/College
University of Lethbridge Archives	Lethbridge	AB	University/College
University of Western Ontario Archives Archives & Research Collections Centre	London	ON	University/College
University of Windsor Leddy Library Archives & Special Collections	Windsor	ON	University/College
Newfoundland Historical Society / Archival & Library Collection	St. John's	NL	University/College

== See also ==
- List of archives
- List of Archives Associations specific to Canadian territories
- List of genealogical societies in Canada
- List of museums in Canada
- Culture of Canada
- Open access in Canada to scholarly communication
