= Basil H. Johnston =

Canadian writer

Basil Johnston
- Born: July 13, 1939; Parry Island Indian Reserve, Ontario, Canada
- Died: September 8, 2015 (aged 86); Wiarton, Ontario, Canada
- Writing career
- Notable awards: Order of Ontario

Basil H. Johnston OOnt (13 July 1929 – 8 September 2015) was an Anishinaabe (Ojibwa) and Canadian writer, storyteller, language teacher and scholar.

== Biography ==
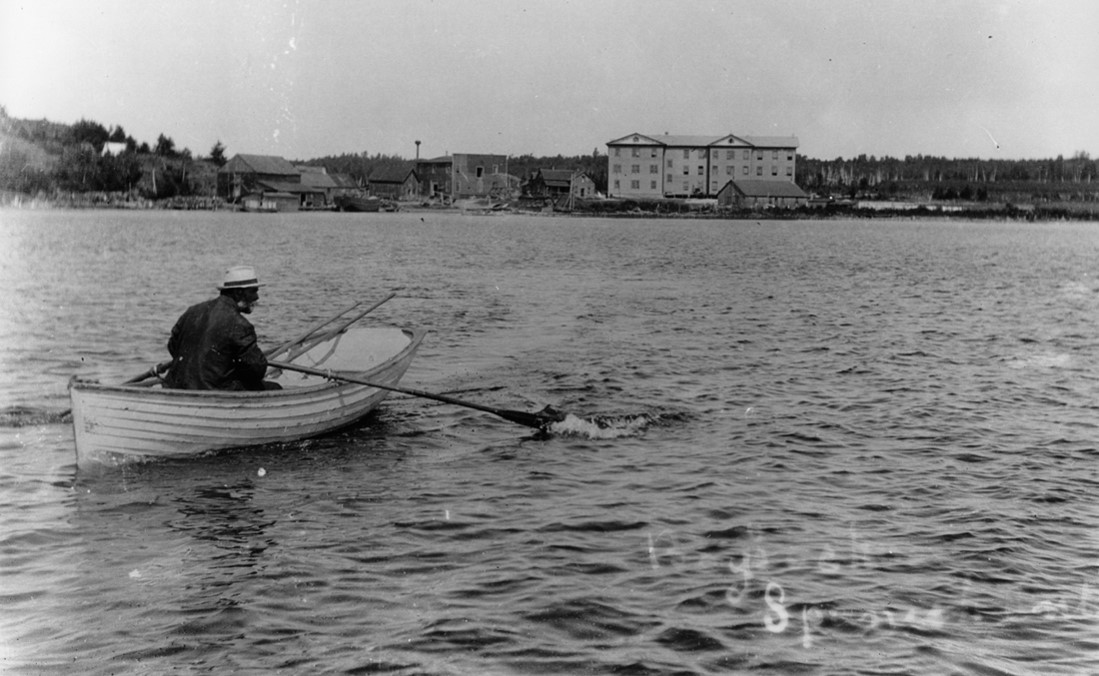
St. Peter Claver School for Boys

Johnston was born July 13, 1929, on the Parry Island Indian Reserve to Rufus and Mary (née Lafrenière) Johnston. He was a member of the Chippewas of Nawash Unceded First Nation, formerly Cape Croker (Neyaashiinigmiing), in the Bruce Peninsula.

Johnston was educated in reserve schools in Cape Croker and later sent, along with his sister Marilyn, to residential school in Spanish, Ontario. He wrote about his experience as a student at St. Peter Claver School for Boys in his 1988 book Indian School Days. After graduating high school as class valedictorian, he earned his B.A. with Honours from Loyola College (1954) and a high school teaching certificate from the Ontario College of Education (1962). In 1959, Johnston married Lucie Desroches, with whom he had three children – Miriam, Tibby and Geoffery.

Johnston died in 2015 at Wiarton, Ontario. Before his death he donated his papers, including photographs, correspondence and manuscripts to the McMaster University Library for use by researchers in the William Ready Division of Archives and Research Collections.

=== Teaching ===
Johnston taught high school at Earl Haig Secondary School in North York, Ontario, from 1962 to 1969, before taking a position in the Ethnology Department of the Royal Ontario Museum in Toronto. Part of his focus during his 25 years with the museum was the regeneration of the language, values and beliefs of Anishinaabe heritage. He developed an extensive series of Ojibwa language courses on tape and in print, believing that traditional language education was essential to understanding Indigenous culture. In the 1990 essay "One Generation From Extinction" he examined the essential role Indigenous language and literature play in restoring lost "Indianness". Of the impacts of lost language he explains:

There is cause to lament but it is the native peoples who have the most cause to lament the passing of their languages. They lose not only the ability to express the simplest of daily sentiments and needs but they can no longer understand the ideas, concepts, insights, attitudes, rituals, ceremonies, institutions brought into being by their ancestors; and, having lost the power to understand, cannot sustain, enrich, or pass on their heritage. No longer will they think Indian or feel Indian.

=== Writing ===
Johnston wrote extensively in both English and Ojibwa. Though he went on to publish numerous books, articles and poems, publishing companies were initially reluctant to release Johnston's work. While publishers recognized the authenticity of his writing, they questioned whether there was a market for it. His first book Ojibway Heritage was published in 1976 thanks to the support of Jack McClelland and Anna Porter of McClelland & Stewart. In 1978 Porter proved equally instrumental, fighting for the publication of Johnston's second book, Moose Meat and Wild Rice, after a McClelland & Stewart editor suggested the publisher pass on the title, in part, because stories of its kind were "currently passé." The book, which was nominated for a Stephen Leacock Memorial Medal for Humour, comprised 22 fictional short-stories and offered satirical comment about the relationship between Indigenous peoples, government officials and the nature of acculturation. In 1988, Johnston again worked with Porter to publish his memoir Indian School Days under Porter's new publishing company, Key Porter Books. Indian School Days "was the first memoir to focus entirely on the Indian residential school experience and the first written by an Anishinaabemowin speaker"

== Awards ==
Johnston was honoured with numerous awards for his work in preserving Ojibwa language and culture in addition to Honorary Doctorates from the University of Toronto, Laurentian University and Brandon University.

- Order of Ontario (1989)
- 125th Anniversary of the Confederation of Canada Medal (1992)
- National Aboriginal Achievement Award for Heritage and Spirituality (2004)
- Debwewin Citation for excellence in storytelling (2012)
- Ontario Arts Council Aboriginal Arts Award (2013)
- National Aboriginal Achievement Award for Heritage and Spirituality (2014)

== Bibliography ==
- North American Indians: outline. Indian-Eskimo Association of Canada (Toronto: 1971).
- Ojibway heritage. New York: Columbia University Press. 1976. ISBN 0231041683.
- Canada: Discovering Our Heritage. Pearson Custom Publishing (Boston: 1977). By David Smith, Chris Andreae, Basil Johnston, E. Mitchner and Ann MacKenzie.
- How the birds got their colours = Gah w'indinimowaut binaesheehnyuk w'idinauziwin-wauh. Toronto: Kids Can Press. 1978. ISBN 0919964192. With Del Ashkewe. Illustrated by David Johnson.
- Moose meat and wild rice. Toronto: McClelland and Stewart. 1978. ISBN 0771044437.
- Ojibway Language Course Outline for beginners. Royal Ontario Museum (Toronto: 1978).
- Ojibway Language Lexicon for beginners. Royal Ontario Museum (Toronto: 1978).
- Tales the elders told : Ojibway legends. Toronto: Royal Ontario Museum. 1981. ISBN 0888542615. Drawings by Shirley Cheechoo.
- Brève histoire du Collège Saint-Alexandre. Collège Saint-Alexandre (Touraine: 1981).
- Grosser Weisser Falke : der Lebenskreis eines Ojibwa. Eugen Diederichs Verlag (Köln: 1982).
- Und Manitu erschuf die Welt : Mythen und Visionen der Ojibwa. Diederichs (München: 1984).
- Nanabusch und Grosser Geist : Geschichten der Odschibwä Indianer (Kanada). Verlag St. Gabriel (Mödling-Wien: 1985). By Basil Johnston; Shirley Cheechoo; Käthe Recheis.
- By Canoe & Moccasin: Some Native Place Names of the Great Lakes. Waapoone Publishing and Promotion (Lakefield: 1986). Illustrated by David Beyer.
- Ojibway ceremonies (3. [Dr.] ed.). Toronto, Ontario: McClelland & Stewart. 1994. ISBN 0771044453.
- Indian School Days. Toronto: University of Oklahoma Press. 1988. ISBN 9780806126104.
- "One Generation from Extinction" in Native Writers and Canadian Literature. University of British Columbia Press (Vancouver: 1990).
- Hudson Bay Watershed: a photographic memoir of the Ojibway, Cree, and Oji-Cree. Dundurn Press (Toronto: 1991). By John MacFie and Basil H. Johnston.
- Hudson Bay portraits: native peoples of the Hudson Bay watershed. Dundurn Press (Toronto: 1992). By John Macfie and Basil Johnston.
- Tales of the Anishinaubaek. Royal Ontario Museum. 1993. With Maxine Noel and the Royal Ontario Museum.
- The Manitous : the spiritual world of the Ojibway (1. ed.). New York, NY: HarperCollins. 1995. ISBN 0060171995.
- The bear-walker and other stories. Toronto: Royal Ontario Museum. 1995. ISBN 0888544154. Illustrated by David Johnson.
- Readings: selections from HarperCollins Spring/Summer 1995 nonfiction list. HarperCollins Publishers (New York: 1995). By Annie Dillard; Basil Johnston; Ellis Cose; Philip Langdon; Emma Donoghue; Lawrence Graham; Paul Solotaroff; Eleanor Anne Lanahan; HarperCollins (Firm)
- American film stories. P. Reclam (Stuttgart: 1996). By Reingard M. Nischik; Sam Shepard; Basil Johnston; Tom Clark; Richard Brautigan; Jayne Anne Phillips; T Coraghessan Boyle; Ray Bradbury; William Saroyan; Charles Johnson
- The star man and other tales (Wah-sa-ghe-zik). Toronto: Royal Ontario Museum. 1996. ISBN 0888544197. With Jonas George.
- Mermaids and Medicine Women. Royal Ontario Museum (Toronto: 1998).
- The Art of Norval Morrisseau, The Writings of Basil H. Johnston. The Glenbow Museum (Calgary: 1999).
- Crazy Dave. Toronto: Key Porter Books. 1999. ISBN 155263051X.
- The nature of plants: excerpted from Ojibway heritage by Basil Johnston. Great Lakes Indian Fish & Wildlife Commission (Odanah, WI: 199X).
- Honour Earth Mother: Mino-audjaudauh Mizzu-Kummik-Quae. University of Nebraska Press (Lincoln: 2003).
- Anishinaubae Thesaurus. Michigan State University Press (East Lansing: 2007).
- Think Indian: languages are beyond price. Kegedonce Press (Chippewas of Nawash First Nation, Ontario: 2011).
- Living in Harmony: Mino-nawae-indawaewin. Kegedonce Press (Chippewas of Nawash First Nation, Ontario: 2012).

== Filmography ==
- The Man, the Snake and the Fox. National Film Board of Canada (Montreal: 1978). Directed and produced by Tony Snowsill, written by Basil Johnston.
- Native Indian folklore. National Film Board of Canada (Montreal: 1993). By Alanis Obomsawin; Wolf Koenig; Brian McLeod; Tony Westman; Tony Snowsill; Basil Johnston; Les Krizson; Francois Hartman; Eunice Macaulay; Tex Kong; National Film Board of Canada.
