= List of Canadian archives associations =

This is a list of Canadian archives associations, i.e., professional associations in Canada that are relevant to the work of archives and archivists.

Included are provincial and territorial associations, national special-interest groups, and history/oral-history/built-heritage associations that are specific to a Canadian location.

== Canadian archives associations ==
Association	Region of focus	Location	Archives or Archivist sector	Parent organization
Accessibility SIS (ASIS)	National		Accessibility	ACA
Archives Association of British Columbia (AABC)	British Columbia	BC	Regional	ACA
Archives Association of Ontario (AAO)	Ontario	Toronto, ON	Regional	
Archives Association of Ontario East est (AAOEe)	Eastern Ontario	ON	Regional	AAO
Archives Council of Nunavummi	Nunavut	Toronto, ON	Regional	
Archives Council of Prince Edward Island (ACPEI)	Prince Edward Island	PEI	Regional	
Archives Society of Alberta (ASA)	Alberta	AB	Regional	
Association des archivistes du Québec (AAQ)	National	QC	Regional	
Association for Manitoba Archives (AMA)	Manitoba	Winnipeg, MB	Regional	
Association of Canadian Archivists (ACA)	National	Ottawa, ON		
ACA@UBC	University of British Columbia	Vancouver, BC	Student chapter	ACA
Association of Canadian Map Libraries and Archives (ACMLA)	National		Maps	
Association of Independent School Archivists (AISA)	Ontario	ON	Education	AAO
Association of Law Office Records Managers and Archivists (ALORMA)	Ontario	Toronto, ON	Records management, Law	
Association of Newfoundland and Labrador Archives (ANLA)	Newfoundland and Labrador	NL	Regional	
Association of Records Managers and Administrators Canada (ARMA): ARMA Calgary; ARMA Edmonton; ARMA Montreal; ARMA National Capital Region (Ottawa); ARMA New Brunswick; ARMA Northwestern Ontario; ARMA Nova Scotia; ARMA Prince Edward Island; ARMA Saskatchewan; ARMA Terra Nova; ARMA Toronto; ARMA Vancouver; ARMA Vancouver Island; ARMA Winnipeg	National	Multiple	Records management, with regional chapters	ARMA International
Canadian Association of Music Libraries, Archives and Documentation Centres (CAML)	National		Music	
Canadian Council of Archives (CCA)	National	ON	Advocacy body	
Canadian Historical Association	National	Ottawa, ON	History	
Canadian Museums Association	National	Ottawa, ON	Museum	
Canadian Oral History Association	National		Oral history	
Catholic Archives Group (CAG)	National		Religion (Catholicism)	
Council of Archives New Brunswick (CANB)	New Brunswick	NB	Regional	
Council of Nova Scotia Archives (CNSA)	Nova Scotia	NS	Regional	
Dal ACA	Dalhousie University	Halifax, NS	Student chapter	ACA
Durham Region Area Archives Group (DRAAG)	Durham Region	ON	Regional	AAO
Fonds d'archives culturelles francophones	National		French	
Government Records Special Interest Section (GRSIS)	National		Government	ACA
Group of Archivists of the Region of Montreal (GARM)	Montreal	Montreal, QC	Regional	
Historica Canada	National		History	
McGill ACA	McGill University	Montreal, QC	Student chapter	ACA
Municipal Archives Interest Group (MAIG)	Ontario	ON	Municipal	AAO
Municipal Archives Special Interest Section (MASIS)	National		Municipal	ACA
National Trust for Canada	National	Ottawa, ON	Built heritage	
Northwest Territories Archives Council	Northwest Territories	NT	Regional	
Northwestern Ontario Archivists' Association (NOAA)	Northwestern Ontario	ON	Regional	AAO
Photographic Historical Society of Canada	National	Etobicoke, ON	Photography	
Réseau des services d'archives du Québec	Quebec	Montreal, QC	Regional	
Saskatchewan Council for Archives and Archivists (SCAA)	Saskatchewan	SK	Regional	
Saskatoon Area Archives Group (SAAG)	Saskatoon	Saskatoon, SK	Regional	SCAA
Sound/Moving Images Special Interest Section (SMISIS)	National		Sound, Moving images	ACA
Southwestern Ontario Chapter (SWOC)	Southwestern Ontario	ON	Regional	AAO
SIS for Access & Privacy Issues (SISAPI)	National		Access, Privacy	ACA
SIS for Archives of Religious Organizations (SISARO)	National		Religion	ACA
SIS for Indigenous Archives (SISIA)	National		Indigenous	ACA
SIS for Personal Archives (SISPA)	National		Personal	ACA
Technology & Archives Special Interest Section (TaASIS)	National		Technology	ACA
Toronto Area Archivists' Group (TAAG)	Toronto	Toronto, ON	Regional	AAO
University & Colleges Archives Special Interest Section (UCASIS)	National		Education (post-secondary)	ACA
UofM ACA	University of Manitoba	Winnipeg, MB	Student chapter	ACA
UofT ACA	University of Toronto	Toronto, ON	Student chapter	ACA
Visual Researchers' Society of Canada	National		Visual resources	
Yukon Council of Archives (YCA)	Yukon	YT	Regional	

== See also ==
- List of archives
- List of genealogical societies in Canada
- List of archives in Canada
