= Shirley Spragge =

Canadian archivist and academic

- Born: Shirley Campbell Cox; July 22, 1929; Toronto, Ontario, Canada
- Died: August 11, 1995 (aged 66)

Academic background
- Education: University of Toronto; Queen's University
- Thesis: Organizing the Wilderness: A Study of a Loyalist Settlement, Augusta Township, Grenville, 1784-1814 (1986)

Shirley Spragge (July 27, 1929 – August 11, 1995) was a Canadian archivist and academic who served as the head of the Queen's University Archives from 1992 to 1994.

== Early life and education ==
Spragge was born July 22, 1929, in Toronto, Ontario. She completed a degree in history at the University of Toronto in 1952. While there she was a member of various clubs including modern history, music and athletics. After studying archives administration at Public Archives of Canada, she completed an MA in history at Queen's University in 1974. Spragge obtained her PhD at Queen's in 1986.

== Career ==
Spragge worked at the Cornell University Archives in the 1970s. She joined the Queen's University Archives in 1979, where she worked while completing her PhD. She was named Queen's University Archivist in 1992, succeeding Anne MacDermaid.

In addition to her roles at Queen's Spragge served as the diocesan archivist for the Diocese of Ontario of the Anglican Church. She was the Book Review Editor of Archivaria from 1993 to 1995.

== Personal life ==
Spragge married Godfrey Spragge in November 1953 in Toronto. Together they had two children. Her father-in-law, George Warburton Spragge, was the Archivist of Ontario from 1950 to 1963.

Spragge died August 11, 1995, in Kingston.

== Legacy ==
In 1998 the Archives Association of Ontario established the Shirley Spragge Fund to support educational pursuits in the archival profession. Restructured and renamed in 2014, the Shirley Spragge Bursary is awarded annually to assist a successful applicant with annual AAO conference attendance costs.

== Select publications ==
- Spragge, Shirley (23 October 1995). "The Abdication Crisis: Are Archivists Giving Up Their Cultural Responsibility?". Archivaria: 173–181. ISSN 1923-6409.
- Spragge, Shirley (1 January 1990). ""One Parchment Book at the Charge of the Parish…": A Sample of Anglican Record Keeping". Archivaria. 30. ISSN 1923-6409.
- Spragge, Shirley (1 January 1985). "The "Good Americans" Two Hundred Years Later". Archivaria. 21: 191–197. ISSN 1923-6409.
