= Archives of Ontario =

Provincial archives in Canada

- Archives publiques de l'Ontario

Agency overview
- Formed: 1903
- Headquarters: 134 Ian Macdonald Boulevard Toronto, Ontario
- Minister responsible: Minister of Public and Business Service Delivery and Procurement
- Agency executive: Jacqueline Spencer, Archivist of Ontario
- Website: www.archives.gov.on.ca

The Archives of Ontario are the archives for the province of Ontario, Canada. Founded in 1903 as the Bureau of Archives, the archives are now under the responsibility of the Ministry of Public and Business Service Delivery and Procurement. The main offices of the archive are located at York University in Toronto.

== History ==
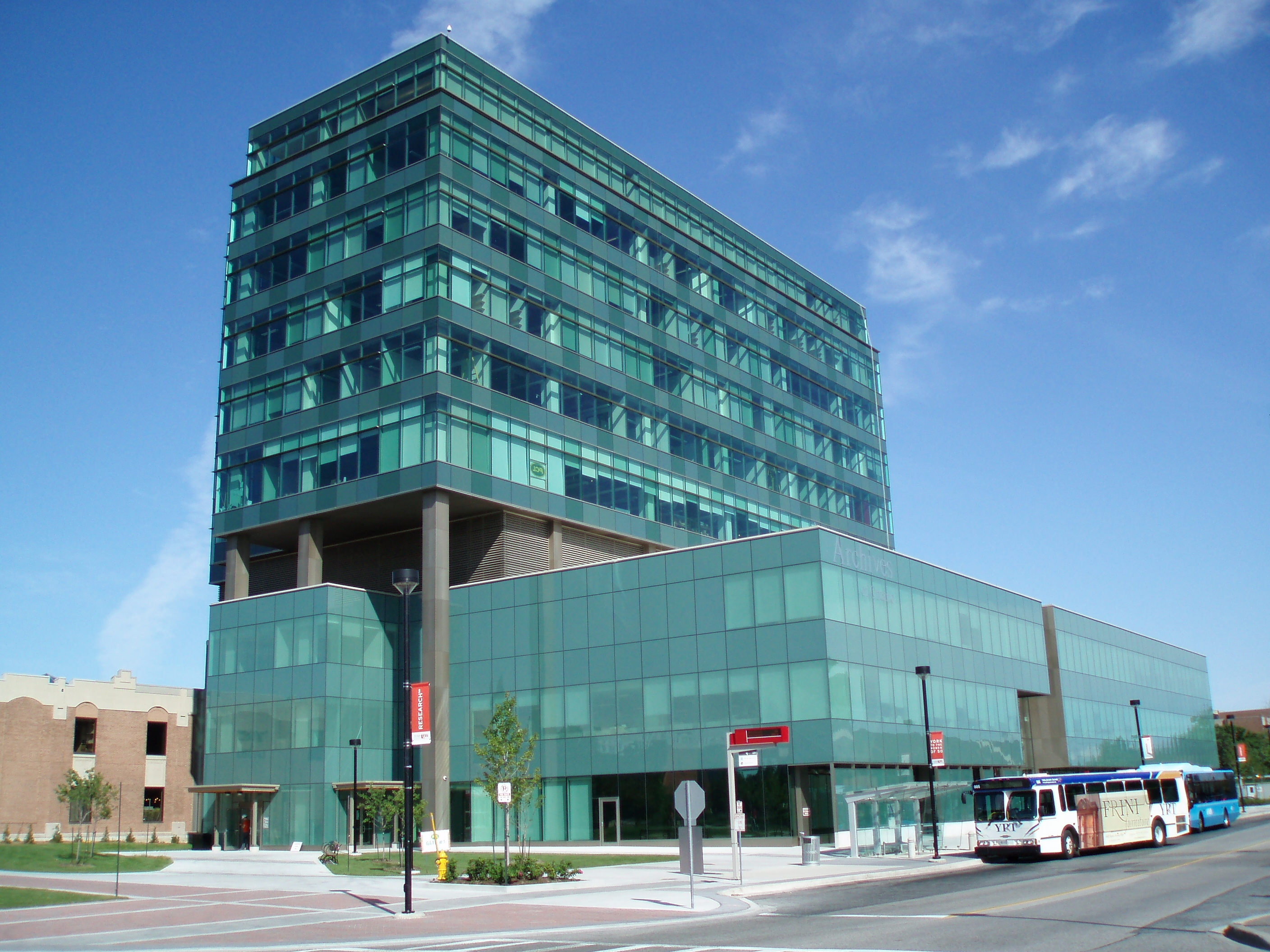
The York University Research Tower and Archives of Ontario building

The Bureau of Archives, as it was originally known, was first located in the Ontario Legislative Building, under the leadership of Alexander Fraser (1860–1936), a Scottish-born Toronto journalist, academic and militia officer who held the position of Provincial Archivist from 1903 to 1935. During his tenure, Fraser remained a prolific author and amongst other things prepared annual reports for publication describing progress in making records available to the public, and presenting the full texts of major document collections. He summarized his vision for the scope and work of the Archives in a paper he presented to the American Historical Association at Buffalo in 1911. In it he described the popularity of the Archives annual report volumes amongst historians and members of the public.

In the Depression era, the Archives was put on a precarious footing by Premier Mitch Hepburn's desire to close it down as a cost-cutting measure. Fraser was targeted for retirement and his assistant James J. Talman became acting head while also tasked with heading the Legislative Library. Talman was able to save the Archives by agreeing to move its office and collections to basement vaults. Talman eventually took new employment as Chief Librarian at the University of Western Ontario, where he started an archives collection that became the Regional History Division at UWO. Fraser's private papers as Provincial Archivist found their first home there. The Ontario Archives was not returned to a solid footing until the late 1940s under Helen McClung.

The Archives moved to the Canadiana Building (14 Queen's Park Crescent West) on the University of Toronto campus in 1951, at which time it was known as the Department of Public Records and Archives. During the period the Archives was located there, staff archivists, including Edwin Guillet, became well known for their research work in support of the Archaeological and Historic Sites Board - which placed historical site plaques throughout the province - and for preparation of historical surveys of many regions of the province that were published as part of a series of volumes describing the work of conservation authorities in Ontario - also restricted from Internet access by Crown copyright.

The Archives relocated to 77 Grenville Street in 1972 and its name was also changed to the Archives of Ontario. The reading room at the Grenville building closed on March 26, 2009, as part of the move to new facilities in North York.

The official groundbreaking ceremony for the new Archives of Ontario building on the York University grounds, which also houses the York University Research Tower, was on April 30, 2007. The groundbreaking was attended by former Minister of Government Services Gerry Phillips and former York University President and Vice-Chancellor Lorna Marsden. The building was opened to the public on April 2, 2009, and is expected to be the site of the Archives for at least the next thirty-five years.

In addition to preserving the records of the Ontario government, the Archives has from the outset actively sought records of private individuals and organizations that reflect Ontario's history. In the words of Alexander Fraser, "The Province has been so long entirely neglected that when I undertook to organize the department I decided that the most valuable service I could render to the public was to acquire, to collect, and safely preserve whatever material I could find, believing the day would soon come when the value of such material would be fully realized and the necessary office assistance provided to enable me to make the accumulated archives conveniently accessible to the public."

Notable private records include the fonds of Eaton's, Conn Smythe, and Moriyama and Teshima Architects.

== List of Archivists of Ontario ==
The head of the Archives has been known as the Archivist of Ontario since 1923, prior to that they were known as the Provincial Archivist.

Name	Term	Notes
Alexander Fraser	1903–1935	
James J. Talman	1935–1939	Acting, also serving as Acting Legislative Librarian
Helen A. McClung	1939–1944	Acting
John H. Bennett	1944	
Helen A. McClung	1944–1950	
George W. Spragge	1950–1963	
Donald F. McOuat	1963–1978	
William G. Ormsby	1978–1986	
Ian E. Wilson	1986–1999	
Miriam McTiernan	1999–2010	
David Nicholl	2010	
Angela Forest	2010–2013	
James Hamilton	2013–2015	
John Roberts	2015–2024	
Jacqueline Spencer	2024-	

== See also ==
- Archives of Ontario GLAM-Wiki page
