= Peterborough Museum & Archives =

History museum in Peterborough, Ontario, Canada

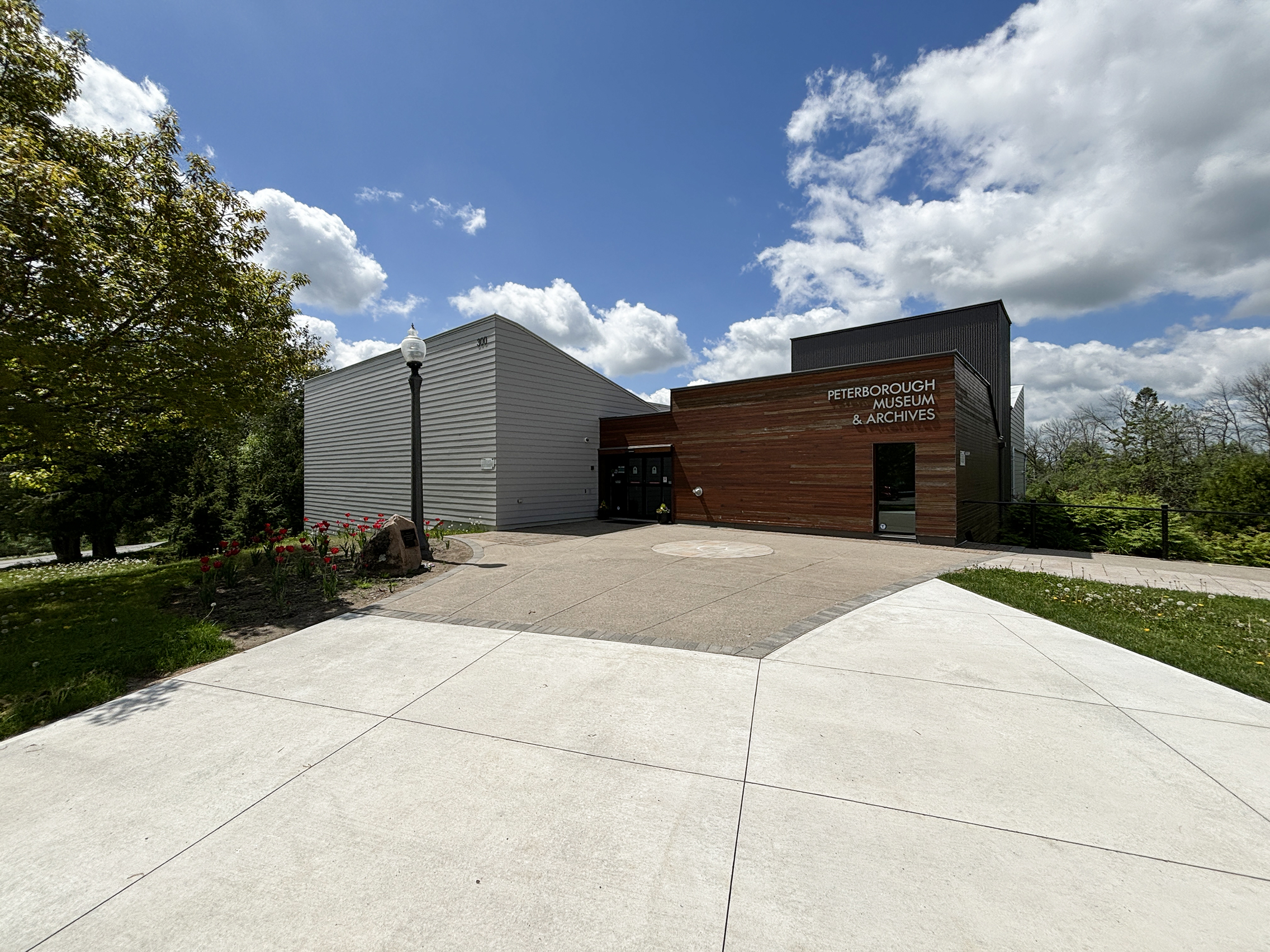
- Established: 1897 (current location: since 1967)
- Location: 300 Hunter Street East; Peterborough, Ontario; K9J 6Y5
- Coordinates: 44.30722°N 78.30413°W
- Visitors: ~32,000 per year
- Website: Peterborough Museum & Archives

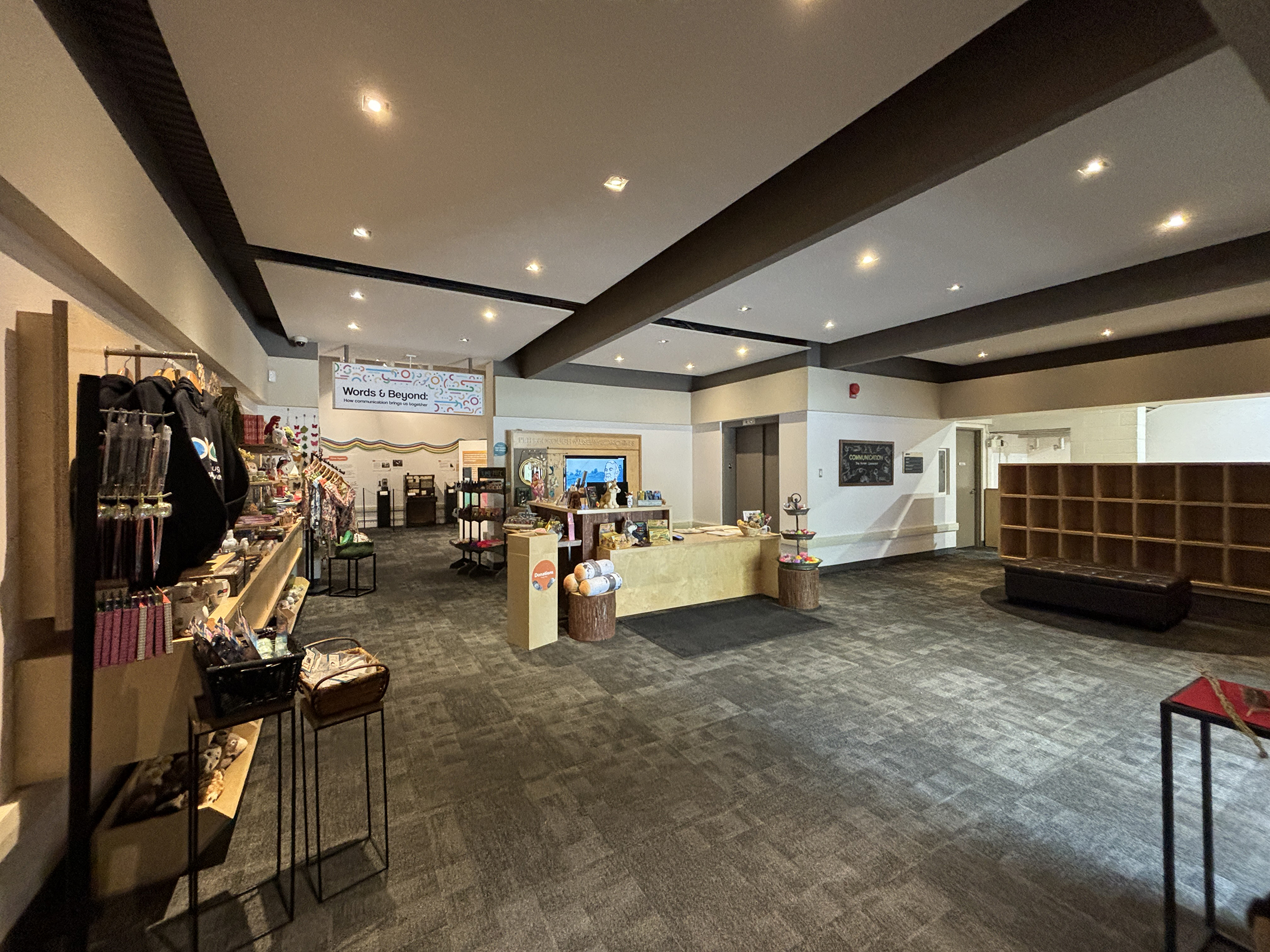
Reception

The Peterborough Museum & Archives, formerly the Peterborough Centennial Museum and Archives (PCMA), is a historical museum located in Peterborough, Ontario, Canada. Found only a short distance from the Trent-Severn Waterway National Historic Site of the Peterborough Lift Lock, the museum has a history spanning well over a century and is home to the second oldest historical collection of its kind within Ontario. Thousands of linear feet of archival materials and over 33,000 artifacts are included in the collection, of which only 3% is displayed at any one time due to space restrictions.

== History ==
=== Site history ===
The museum site itself is one of architectural, geographical and historical significance all within its own right. The museum is located atop of a drumlin known informally as Armour Hill. This elevation offers one of the best vantage points for viewing the surrounding countryside and is inclusive to the Oak Ridges Moraine / Peterborough Drumlin Field.

The firm of Craig, Zeidler and Strong was contracted on July 14, 1965 as the architectural designers. In the decades that have followed, the work of Eberhard Zeidler has become internationally renowned for distinctive and innovative design.

A Heritage Pavilion can be found just a short stroll from the main site. This structure is constructed from 150-year white pine which was resurrected from a Methodist meeting house built during the 1840s in downtown Peterborough.

The Heritage Pavilion

The land upon which the museum resides was donated to the City of Peterborough, and is more formally known as Ashburnham Memorial Park. A plaque at the summit reads, "This park was given to the City of Peterborough by the Women's Patriotic League of Ashburnham in memory of the men of Peterborough who fell in the Great War of 1914–1918."

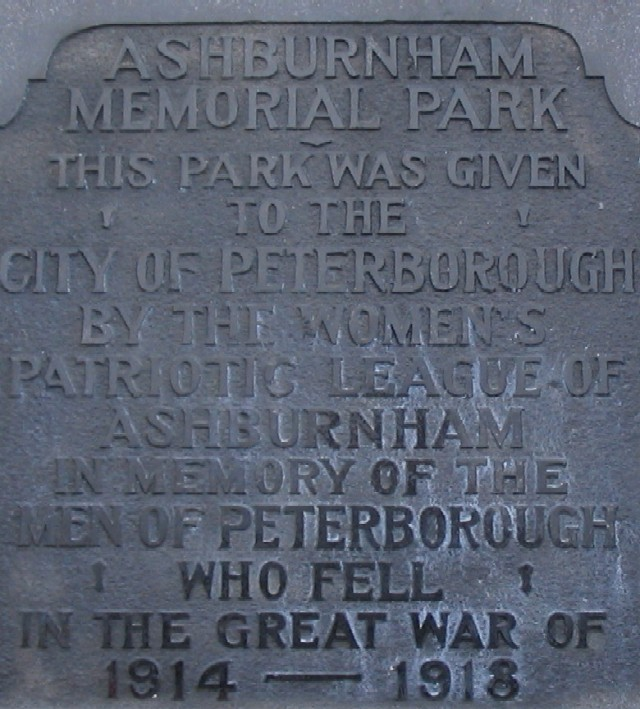
Memorial Park dedication

=== Museum history ===
Peterborough's first museum was opened to the public on October 31, 1898 by the local historical society. The Victoria Museum, dedicated in honour of Queen Victoria, was located near Inverlea Park. In April 1912, the collection was moved to the new Carnegie Public Library on George Street, which is now part of the Peterborough City Hall. Renovations, moves and growth highlighted the need for a new permanent location for the collection by the late 1950s. The current site was officially opened to the public on October 28, 1967 as a centennial project and includes much of the Victoria Museum's original collection. The archives collection was introduced to the museum in the mid-1970s.

Almost four decades of growth, and the recent acquisitions of the Balsillie Collection of Roy Studio Images and the Parks Studio fonds, have forced the museum to store some holdings off-site. Unfortunately, the City of Peterborough itself experienced major flooding during July 2004 as a result of torrential and prolonged rainfall. A very rare and yet severe storm for this geographic area gained national attention within Canada and forced the creation of the Peterborough Flood Relief Committee. While restoration of the damaged items continues, the museum did look forward to realizing an expansion proposed through a feasibility study introduced in April of that year.

== Organization ==
The museum is managed by the Culture & Heritage Division of the City of Peterborough as part of the Corporation of the City of Peterborough, Ontario, Canada. Donations come from individuals, families, organizations and businesses.

The museum is affiliated with CMA, CHIN, and Virtual Museum of Canada. The Museum and Archives is a member of the Ontario Museums Association and the Archives Association of Ontario.

In furthering the mission statement, PCMA is a campus location for a Museum Management and Curatorship Program with ties to both local post secondary educational institutions, Fleming College and Trent University.

== Archives ==
The museum archives provide public access to historical documents collected and preserved as they relate to Peterborough and the surrounding areas. These include architectural drawings, blueprints, business records, computer media, diaries, government records, letters, maps, minute books, motion pictures, paintings, sketches, photographs and videotapes. Due to space restrictions, public visits to the archives require an appointment.

Included are items from noted personalities such as:

- Catharine Parr Traill
  - A pressed-flower album created by the pioneer author and botanist
- The original Peter Robinson papers
  - These chronicle the 1823 emigration of Irish settlers to Ontario, Canada.
- The Park Studio fonds
- The Balsillie collection of Roy Studio images
  - Over 300,000 film and glass plate negatives dating back to 1896

== Collection highlights ==
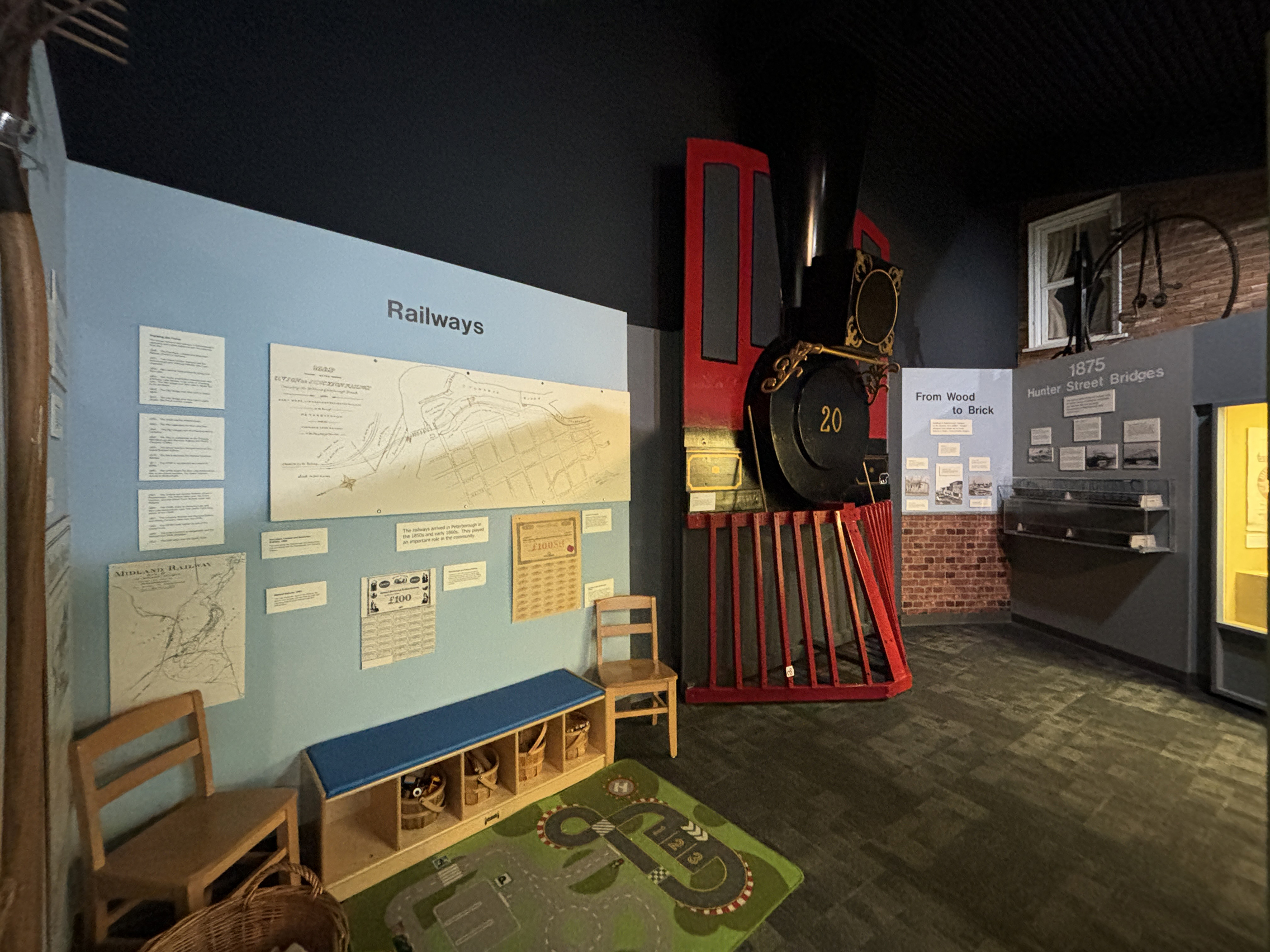
Museum interior

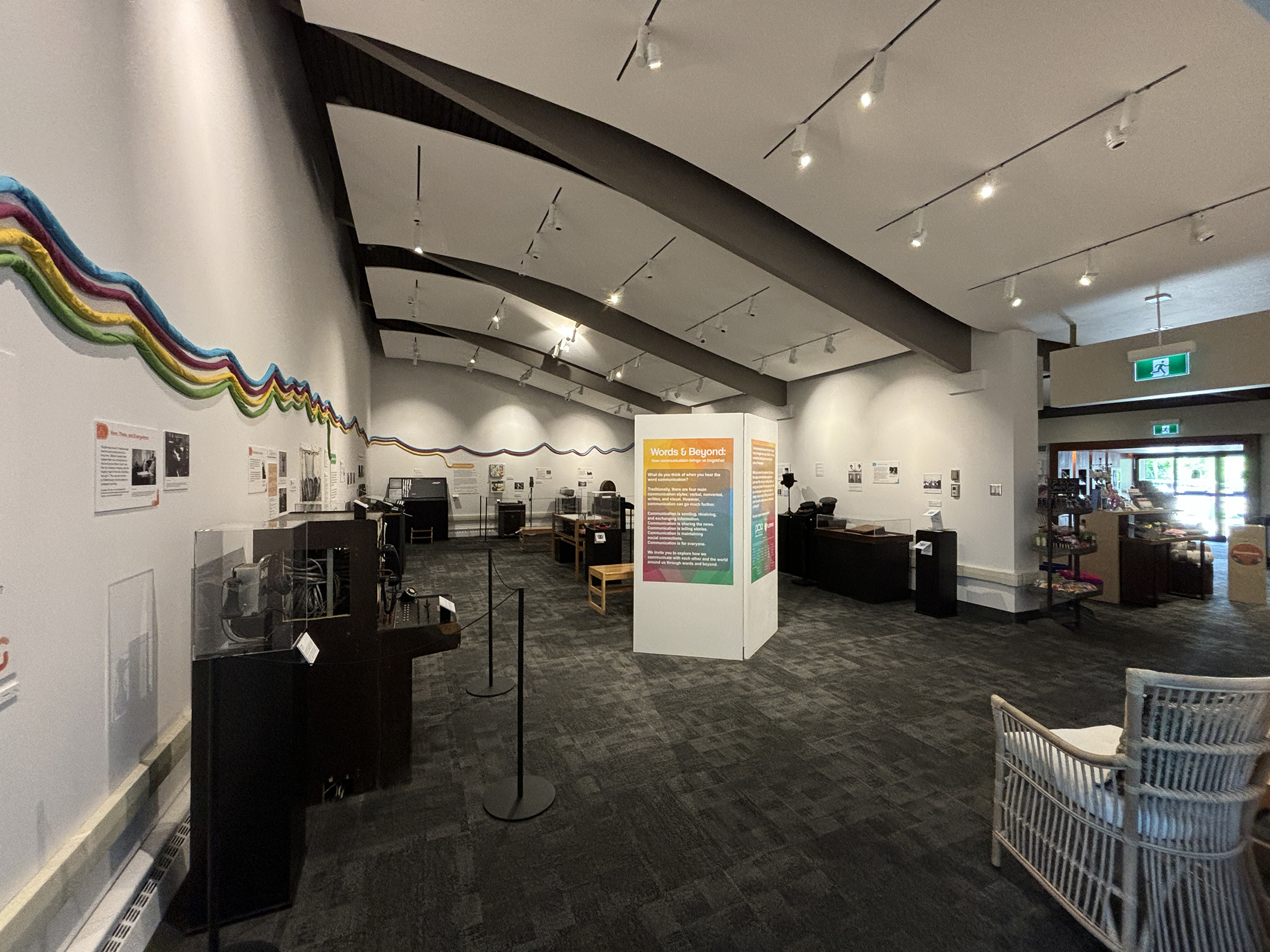
Museum display items for technology

While the focus of the PCMA is Peterborough and area, the museum is home to a diverse collection of artifacts as they relate to the following areas of interest:

- Archaeology
- Ethnography
- Furniture
- Military collections
- Natural history
- Recreational (toys, dolls & sporting equipment)
- Technology
- Textiles
