= Centre for Canadian Historical Horticultural Studies =

The Centre for Canadian Historical Horticultural Studies (CCHHS) includes archives and a program of scholarly study within Royal Botanical Gardens, Ontario (Hamilton, Ontario and Burlington, Ontario). It focuses on collecting and preserving literature, documents, and artifacts relevant to the history of horticulture in Canada.

== History ==
Royal Botanical Gardens began to accumulate literature on Canadian horticulture in the 1960s. In 1979 the CCHHS was formally established as a collaboration between Royal Botanical Gardens and the Dunington-Grubb Foundation. Ina Vrugtman, Royal Botanical Gardens' librarian, coordinated the work of the Centre until her retirement in 1995.

In 1984 the Centre co-sponsored the publication of Edwinna von Baeyer's book, Rhetoric and Roses: A History of Canadian Gardening. The Centre published Canadian Horticultural History, An Interdisciplinary Journal as eight issues in three volumes between 1985 and 1995. The journal covered topics on early Canadian botany, landscape architecture, and plant hybridisation.

Due to changes at Royal Botanical Gardens the scholarly program of the Centre was inactive for several years, although the archival collections continued to grow throughout this period.

The Centre also co-sponsored a 2017 workshop at York University exploring the role women played in botany and horticulture in nineteenth-century Canada called, Women, Men, and Plants in 19th-Century Canada: New Resources, New Perspectives.

== Archival Holdings ==
The CCHHS's collection encompasses resources relating to horticultural plants and their development and uses in Canada. Resources outlining the history of Canadian landscape design also form an important part of the collection. Some of these materials give a more technical account of Canadian horticulture, while others offer a larger view of social changes in Canadian society.

Special Collections:

- Horticultural and Nursery Trade Catalogues: With over 30,000 Canadian and international seed and nursery catalogues, the CCHHS has what is believed to be the largest collection in Canada.

Archival Fonds and Collections:

- The archive has records of notable men and women in horticulture including Isabella Preston, Frank Palmer, Robert Keith, and Art Drysdale, as well as records chronicling the history of Canadian horticultural education and horticultural societies and garden clubs.
  - Ephemera: The archive has numerous clippings, booklets, articles, pamphlets, correspondences, and reports on various horticultural topics.
  - Special collections such as rare books: The archive is still actively collecting titles.
  - Photographs and slides: Including a collection of photographs from the landscape architecture practice of Howard and Lorrie Dunington-Grubb who started Sheridan Nurseries, were among the founders of the Canadian Society of Landscape Architects, as well as worked as successful landscape architects.
  - Horticultural Publications: Including the Canadian Horticulturist, Canadian Florist, and the Keith Florist Directories.
  - Manuscripts: Including an unpublished manuscript, The Garden of To-day, written by Howard Dunington-Grubb
  - Artifacts: Including the Hankinson Collection of over sixty late 19th and early 20th-century hyacinth vases.

== Exhibits ==
- Two Centuries of Women in Canadian Horticulture, 2016 and 2017
- HortiCULTURE: Artifacts from the Archives of the Centre for Historical Horticultural Studies and Royal Botanical Gardens, 2017
- Cultivating Beauty: The History of Ontario Horticultural Societies, 1906–Present, 2018

== Affiliations ==
Royal Botanical Gardens is a member of the Archives Association of Ontario.
