= Alexander Fraser (archivist) =

Canadian scholar, journalist, historian and archivist

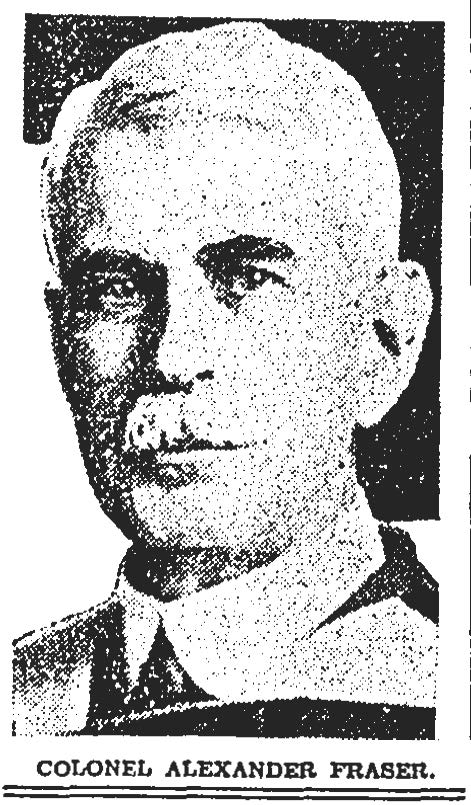
- Portrait published in The Globe, 10 February 1936
- Born: 1860-11-02; Kineras, Inverness-shire
- Died: 1936 (aged 75–76); Toronto, Ontario
- Occupations: archivist, historian
- Spouse: Christina Elizabeth Frances Ramsay (1867-1941)
- Awards: Edinburgh Society of Antiquaries Fellow

Academic work
- Discipline: History, Celtic Studies
- Main interests: Gaelic, History of Canada

Alexander Fraser (1860–1936) was a historian, public lecturer, journalist and secretary to the lieutenant-governor of Ontario from 1914 to 1933. He was also the first archivist of Ontario, from 1903 to 1935.

Fraser emigrated to Canada in 1886, where he found work as a journalist at the Toronto Mail, later the Toronto Mail and Empire. He would later become the city editor in 1889 and resigned in 1898. He was also an editor of several Canadian periodicals, including Massey's Illustrated, The Scottish Canadian, The Presbyterian Review, and Fraser's Scottish Annual. Also a Presbyterian preacher, Fraser was also involved at the University of Toronto's Knox College, where he lectured in Celtic history, taught Gaelic as well as preached. He also taught history at McMaster University in Hamilton, Ontario.

== Early life ==
Fraser was born on 2 November 1860 in Kineras, Inverness-shire, Scotland; his parents were Hugh Fraser and Mary Mackenzie. He went on to study at Davidson's Classical Academy in Perth, and later at Glasgow University.

== Career and public life ==
Fraser served as honorary aide-de-camp during the administrations of Sir John Hendrie, Lionel Herbert Clarke, Henry Cockshutt and W. D. Ross.

Fraser was appointed the first Provincial Archivist of Ontario in June 1903. In this role he prepared the First Report of the Bureau of Archives for the Province of Ontario in 1904 which set out his vision for the archives and included the first inventory of documents held by various governmental departments.

Fraser helped form the 48th Highlanders of Canada of Toronto in 1891. He was also heavily involved in Scottish fraternal organizations in Toronto. At various points in his life he was president of the Gaelic Society, the St. Andrew's Society, The Burns Literary Society of Toronto, the Toronto Shinty Club, the Canadian Fraternal Association, the Clan Fraser Society of Canada and the Toronto-Inverness-Shire Association as well as the Empire Club. He was the Grand Chief of the Sons of Scotland for 14 years and also sponsored the Scottish Games in Canada.

During World War I, Fraser was active in Red Cross Relief work. He was also an honorary colonel of the 127th York Rangers and also a Mason, both a Master of St. John's Lodge and an Officer of The Grand Lodge.

Fraser was, unsurprisingly, heavily involved in preserving and commemorating the colonial history of the province, although he also took an interest in the history of Indigenous communities in the region. In addition to providing advice on writing the history of Ontario's townships, he was also a strong advocate for the creation of public memorials to key historical figures, including the Samuel de Champlain statue in Orillia. and the Jesuit's Shrine at Midland.

Fraser was a respected scholar of Gaelic, Celtic literature and historian. He published a Gaelic grammar, as well as scholarly work on Celtic philology, poetry, Ultonian hero ballads, and Highland and Irish antiquities.

== Selected publications ==
- Fraser, Alexander. Records of the early courts of justice of Upper Canada. Toronto : A. T. Wilgress, 1918.
- Friseal, Alasdair. Gearr-sgeoil air Sir Seoras Uilleam Ros agus air mar a thuinich na gaidheil ann an Canada uachdarch. Toronto, 1915.
- Fraser, Alexander. The Ontario Archives: scope of its operations : paper read at the twenty-seventh annual meeting of the American Historical Association, held at Buffalo, N.Y., December 27–30, 1911. Washington, DC: 1913.
- Brock Centenary, 1812–1912: Account of the Celebration at Queenston Heights, Ontario, on the 12th October, 1912. ed. Alexander Fraser. Toronto: William Briggs, 1912.
- Fraser, Alexander. A history of Ontario: its resources and development. Toronto: Ontario History Company, 1907.
- Fraser, Alexander. First Report of the Bureau of Archives for the Province of Ontario. Toronto: L.K. Cameron, 1904.
- Fraser, Alexander. The Gaelic folk songs of Canada. Ottawa: J. Hope, 1903.
- Friseal, Alasdair. Canain agus Cliu ar Sinnsearean. Toronto: 1901.
- Fraser, Alexander. The 48th Highlanders of Toronto, Canadian Militia : the origin and history of this regiment, and a short account of the Highland regiments from time to time stationed in Canada. Toronto : E.L. Ruddy, 1900.
- Fraser, Alexander. Toronto, historical, descriptive and pictorial. Toronto : R.G. McLean, 1899.
- Fraser, Alexander. The last laird of MacNab; an episode in the settlement of MacNab; an episode in the settlement of MacNab township, Upper Canada, Toronto: Printed by Imrie, Graham & Co. 31 Church Street, 1899.
- Friseal, Alasdair. Leabhar nan sonn : gearr-aithris air curaidhean na craoibhe ruaidhe is air diulanaich iomraiteach la an diugh. Toronto : Clo-Bhuailte le Uilleam Briggs [William Briggs], 1897.

== Awards and honours ==
- 1911: made Edinburgh Society of Antiquaries Fellow
- 1912: Honorary Doctor of Letters, Alfred University (New York)
- 1914: Honorary Doctor of Letters, St. Francis Xavier University
- 1919: Honorary Doctor of Letters, University of Toronto

Since 1988, the Archives Association of Ontario gives out an award named in Fraser's honour. The Alexander Fraser Award is "given to individuals who have contributed in a significant way to the advancement of the archival community in Ontario."

== Personal life ==
Fraser married Christina Elizabeth Frances Ramsay (1867–1941) on 7 March 1889 in Toronto. They had ten children together. The family lived at 67 Woodlawn Avenue.
