= Reingard M. Nischik =

German literary scholar

Reingard Monika Nischik (born 1962 in Herford, Germany) is a retired German university professor and literary scholar.

== Academic career ==
Nischik studied English and North American Literature as well as Social Sciences at the University of Cologne (Germany), taking the First State Examination in 1977. She spent one year of her doctoral studies on a scholarship from the Canadian Government at the University of British Columbia in Vancouver from 1978 to 1979. In 1980 she obtained her Ph.D. from the University of Cologne with a thesis on single and multiple plotting in English-language literatures. Between 1984 and 1989 Nischik conducted postdoctoral studies at the University of Cologne (Germany) and the University of London (UK), on at the topic of mind style. Having worked as an assistant professor at the Chair for Anglo-American Literature at the University of Cologne from 1979 to 1986, Nischik took up a post as a Professor of Comparative Literature at the University of Mainz (Germany) from 1988 to 1992. In 1992, Nischik moved to the University of Freiburg (Germany), where she served as an Associate Professor of North American Literature at the Institute of North American Studies, before she became Full Professor and Chair of North American Literature at the University of Konstanz (Germany) in 1994. Awarded many prizes, fellowships and grants through her career, during the academic year 2009/2010, Nischik was a fellow at the Institute for Advanced Studies at the Center of Excellence "Cultural Foundations of Integration" at the University of Konstanz, funded by the German Universities Excellence Initiative, and in 2014 was awarded the competitive "Freedom for Creativity" by the German Research Foundation (DFG).

== Areas of research ==
In both her teaching and her numerous publications, Nischik has focused on the literature and culture of the United States and Canada, with special emphasis on narratology, the short story, the work of Canadian writer Margaret Atwood, literature and gender, and literature and the visual media (see "Selected publications"). Nischik is considered one of the pioneers and leading scholars of Canadian Studies in Germany and Europe, and is an expert on the works of Margaret Atwood. Her current focus is specifically on Comparative North American Studies.

== Selected publications ==
- Reingard M. Nischik: Comparative North American Studies: Transnational Approaches to American and Canadian Literature and Culture. New York: Palgrave Macmillan, 2015.
- Reingard M. Nischik (ed.): The Palgrave Handbook of North American Literature. New York: Palgrave Macmillan, 2014.
- Reingard M. Nischik: Engendering Genre: The Works of Margaret Atwood. Ottawa: University of Ottawa Press, 2009.
- Reingard M. Nischik (ed.): History of Literature in Canada: English-Canadian and French-Canadian. Rochester, NY: Camden House, 2008.
- Luise von Flotow & Reingard M. Nischik (eds.): Translating Canada. Ottawa: University of Ottawa Press, 2007.
- Reingard M. Nischik (ed.): The Canadian Short Story: Interpretations. Rochester, NY: Camden House, 2007.
- Reingard M. Nischik (ed.): Margaret Atwood: Works and Impact. Rochester, NY: Camden House, 2000.
- Reingard M. Nischik (ed.): New York Fiction. Stuttgart: Reclam, 2000.
- Reingard M. Nischik: Mentalstilistik: Ein Beitrag zu Stiltheorie und Narrativik, dargestellt am Erzählwerk Margaret Atwoods. Tübingen: Narr, 1991.
- Reingard M. Nischik: Einsträngigkeit und Mehrsträngigkeit der Handlungsführung in literarischen Texten: Dargestellt insbesondere an englischen, amerikanischen und kanadischen Romanen des 20. Jahrhunderts. Tübingen: Narr, 1981.

== Awards ==
Nischik has twice been the recipient of the Margaret Atwood Society Best Book Award (for Margaret Atwood: Works and Impact [2000] and for Engendering Genre: The Works of Margaret Atwood [2009].

== Interviews ==
- Reingard Nischik, winner of 2010 Margaret Atwood Society 'Best Book' Award: An Interview by Hildegard Nagler (June 28, 2010) Interview with Reingard Nischik, winner of 2010 Margaret Atwood Society 'Best Book' Award and Aktuelles und Medien | Universität | Universität Konstanz. Reprinted in Südkurier (May 6, 2011) ?Diese Autorin überrascht uns mit jedem neuen Buch?
- "No Canadian Should Ever Be Surprised Again": An Interview with Reingard Nischik (September 30, 2009) by Sarah Banting

== Media ==
- "No Canadian Should Ever Be Surprised Again": An Interview with Reingard Nischik (September 30, 2009) by Sarah Banting
- Reingard M. Nischik at the 50th Anniversary Gala of Canadian Literature 2009 CanLit International: The Reception of Canadian Literature in Germany
