= Edwin C. Guillet =

Canadian historian, author and educator

Edwin Clarence Guillet (September 29, 1898 – 26 June 1975) was a Canadian historian, author and educator. He wrote or edited about 150 books, many about the history of Ontario.

== Early life and education ==
Guillet grew up in Cobourg, Ontario, the son of Edwin Guillet, Sr. and Lula Kemp. He attended Cobourg Public School and also attended high school in Cobourg. An asthmatic condition prevented enlistment during World War I. He studied at the University of Toronto, and graduated in 1922 with a bachelor's degree in Political Sciences and Economics. He attended the Ontario College of Education from 1922 to 1923, and after graduation went on to earn a master's degree in history.

== Career ==
Guillet taught high school at the Eastern High School of Commerce in Toronto, and later worked as an archivist at the Ontario Archives.

Guillet wrote many books about the history of Ontario. Two of his best known books are Early Life in Upper Canada (1933) and Pioneer Days in Upper Canada (1933). His book The Lives and Times of the Patriots, about the 1837 Upper Canada Rebellion, has been extensively referenced by later historians. He also published a study of Ontario taverns and inns. Some of his books, including his 1948 history of the town of Cobourg, are considered "popular histories" and don't specify sources for much of the information.

In 1957 Guillet was the editor of Valley of the Trent, the first of a series of Ontario history books published by the Champlain Society.

He wrote a series of papers about Canadian trials, and a short work exploring the death of Canadian painter, Tom Thomson.

Guillet's papers have been preserved in the archives of Trent University.

== Personal ==
Guillet married Mary Elizabeth Scott in 1925, and the couple had three children.
