= Ukrainian Canadian Archives & Museum of Alberta =

Ukrainian museum in Canada

Ukrainian Canadian Archives & Museum Of Alberta

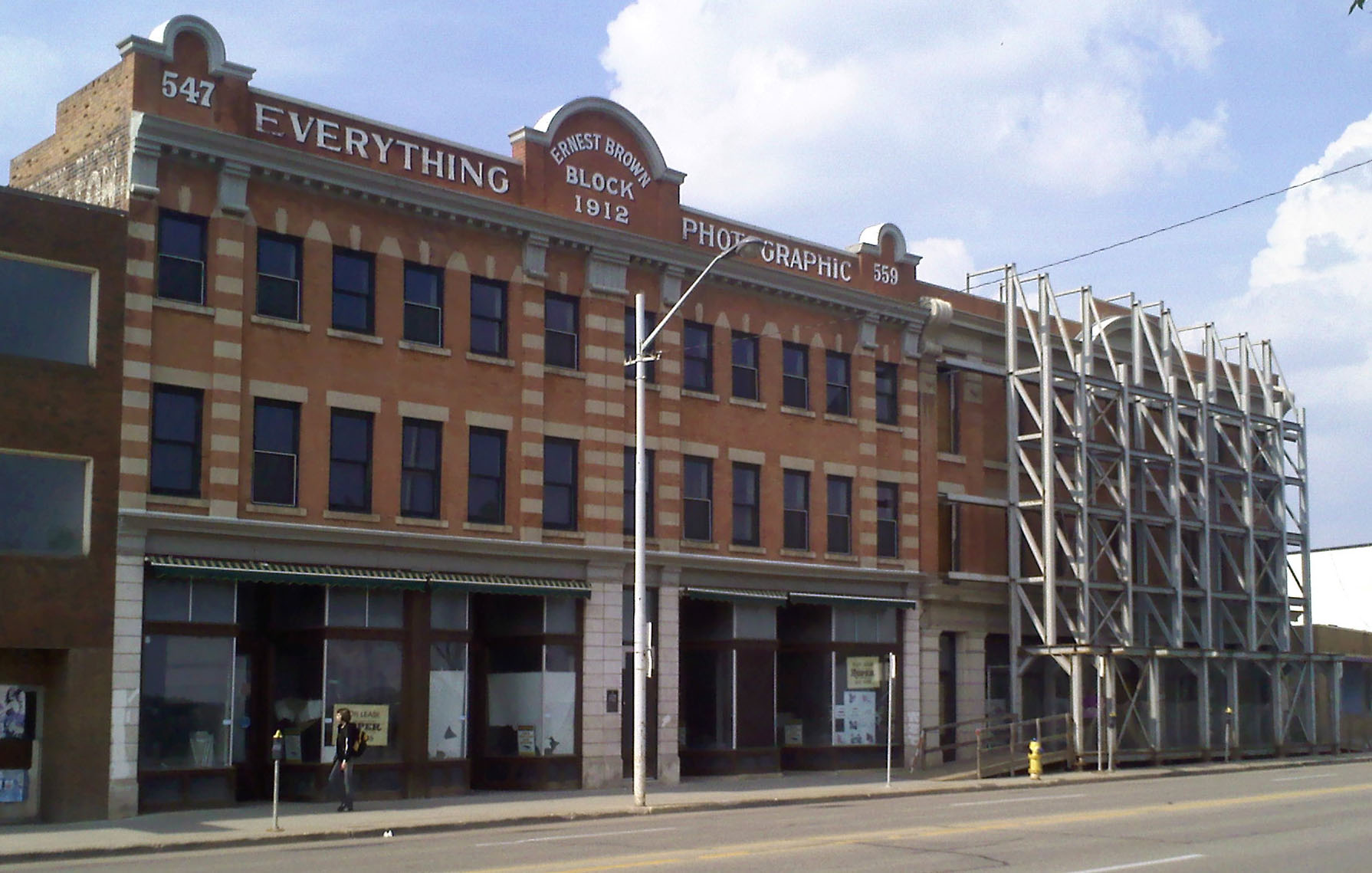
- Established: 1972
- Location: Edmonton, Alberta, Canada
- Coordinates: 53°32′34″N 113°29′3″W
- Type: Historical
- Website: umcalberta.org

The Ukrainian Canadian Archives & Museum Of Alberta (UCAMA) is a Ukrainian museum located in Edmonton, Alberta, Canada. Recently the museum bought the old Lodge Hotel and the Brighton Block located at 9670 Jasper Avenue. The goal is to develop in order to create a facility which will house exhibition galleries, an archive, and library resource area, collection storage areas, educational, meeting and special programming areas. The museum's vision states a number of aspects where growth is expected: creating an opportunity for exploring Ukrainian heritage, enriching the collection of the museum with respect to acquisition policies, transferring the collection to a more up-to-date building and expanding not only the permanent, but also the traveling collection of artifacts that the museum possesses.

== History ==
Ukrainians are one of the Canadian Prairie Provinces' largest ethnic groups. In recognition of this legacy, in 1972, a group of eleven members of the Ukrainian community in Edmonton, led by Hryhory and Stefania Yopyk, decided to establish a facility for the preservation of the history and culture of Canadians of Ukrainian heritage. The official opening date of the museum is 27 October 1974.

In 2003, the museum acquired the Lodge Hotel and the Brighton Block on Jasper Avenue, and obtained C$9.2 million from the city, province, and federal government for a C$13 million renovation. This location has always had close ties with the Ukrainian community, as it was a home for many Ukrainian businesses in the area. Construction began in 2012. Since then, renovation costs have increased to C$22 million. To raise money, the museum plans to sell the Brighton Block to pay for development of the museum in the former Hotel. Ken Cantor and Primavera Development Group have agreed to purchase the property, dependent upon the city allowing him to make specific changes to the building, which is a protected municipal historic resource.

== Collection of the museum ==
Mr. Yopyk started working on the collection in the mid 1960s. His initial approach was contacting the local Ukrainian newspaper and publishing an article that encouraged other Ukrainians to donate books, personal belongings and other printed material. The collection started expanding, and Mr. Yopyk started traveling around Alberta on the weekends to meet with the people who were willing to donate things for his archives. Hryhory also carried the camera with him, as he enjoyed taking photographs of the churches in rural Alberta. At first, Mr. Yopyk kept the collection at home, but as he was expanding the archives, he initially ran out of space and that is when he developed the idea about creating a whole museum out of something he simply enjoyed doing.
