= William Ready Division of Archives and Research Collections =

Coordinates: 43.262831°N 79.917598°W

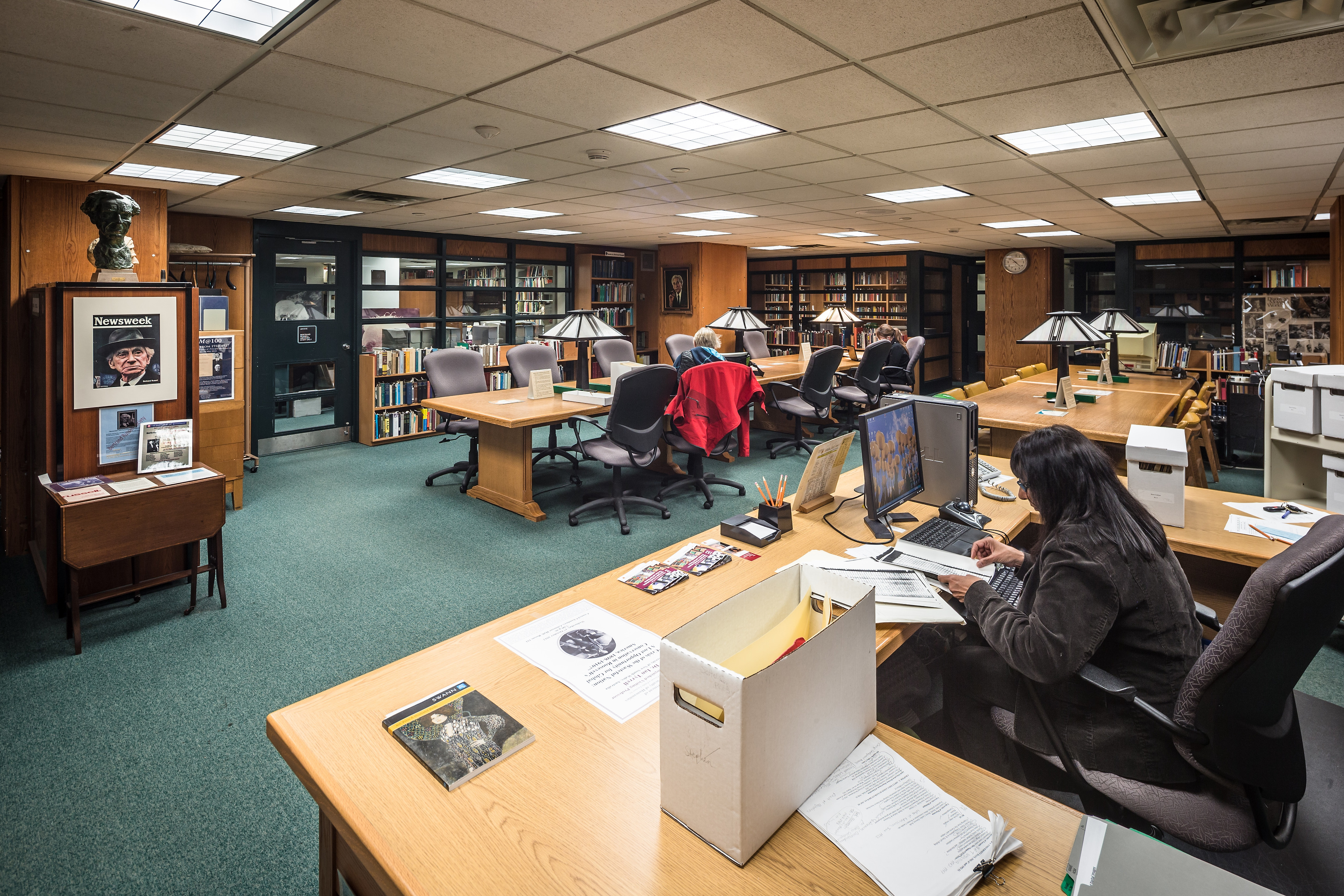
- Location: Mills Memorial Library, Hamilton, Ontario, Canada
- Type: Academic
- Branch of: McMaster University Library

Other information
- Website: http://library.mcmaster.ca/archives/

The William Ready Division of Archives and Research Collections is the principal repository for rare books, archives, maps and historical material at McMaster University. Developed to support teaching, research and scholarship, its holdings reflect fonds and collections pertaining to Canadian literature, politics, popular culture and business history, in addition to war and peace in the 20th century with an emphasis on the Holocaust and Resistance. It also holds a collection of eighteenth century books and journals, and is home to the Bertrand Russell Archives. Part of the McMaster University Library system, the Division of Archives and Research Collections is located in Mills Memorial Library.

== History ==
The Division of Archives and Research Collections is named after William Ready who served as University Librarian from 1966 until his retirement in 1979. In 2002 the Archives was awarded the Archives Association of Ontario's Institutional Award in recognition of its strong archival program and service to the community.

=== William Ready ===
William Bernard Ready (pronounced Reedy) was born on 16 September 1914 in Cardiff, Wales to James Ready and Nora Hart. He obtained a Bachelor of Arts from the University of Wales in 1937, a Master of Arts from the University of Manitoba in 1949 and a Master of Library Science from the University of Western Ontario in 1970, in addition to several diplomas related to archives and library administration. Ready married Bessie Dyer (1917–2007) on 25 April 1945 and together they had six children.

Ready considered himself a "working librarian" and rejected the academic side of librarianship in favour of hands-on work and collection development He was known for his enterprising and cunning approach to building and managing archives and research collections. Having read and enjoyed The Hobbit, Ready asked a London-based book dealer to contact J. R. R. Tolkien about acquiring his works for Marquette University. Concerned about his retirement, Tolkien initially agreed to sell a selection of manuscripts. Further negotiation led to Marquette's acquisition of the manuscripts for The Lord of the Rings and The Hobbit, among others, amounting to more than 11,000 pages. During the same period Ready also secured the personal papers of social activist Dorothy Day. As University Librarian at McMaster he played an instrumental role in securing numerous high-profile collections, most notably the archives of philosopher and political activist Bertrand Russell.

Ready died in Victoria, British Columbia on 12 September 1981, two years after retiring from McMaster. His autobiography, Files on Parade, was published posthumously in 1982.

== Collections ==
The holdings of the Division of Archives and Research Collections reflect a broad spectrum of Canadian popular culture ranging from the records of Canadian publishers and advertisers to the personal papers of internationally recognized authors and musicians. Included are writers Louise Bennett-Coverley, Pierre Berton, Austin Clarke, Marian Engel, Basil H. Johnston and Farley Mowat and singer-songwriters Bruce Cockburn, Ian Thomas and Jackie Washington. A sample of Alice Munro's handwriting, whose letters appears in the fonds of publishers Macmillan Canada and McClelland & Stewart, appeared on a commemorative stamp released by Canada Post in 2015.

Personal papers and research collections of non-Canadian figures are equally well represented by holdings pertaining to Samuel Beckett, Vera Brittain, Thomas Carlyle and Sir George Catlin. The Division of Archives and Research Collection also holds the only surviving manuscript of Anthony Burgess' A Clockwork Orange. The manuscript, along with several of Burgess' early works, was acquired by McMaster as a result of Ready's persistence and eventual friendship with the author. McMaster's copy is of particular interest because it includes the final chapter that was omitted by American publishers of the work. The manuscript contains an annotation in Burgess' hand that reads "Should we end here?", indicating that he questioned its inclusion.

Other items held by the Archives include sheet music from the First World War, historical postcards, and a figure skating collection consisting of books, programs, photographs and postcards.

=== The Bertrand Russell Archives ===
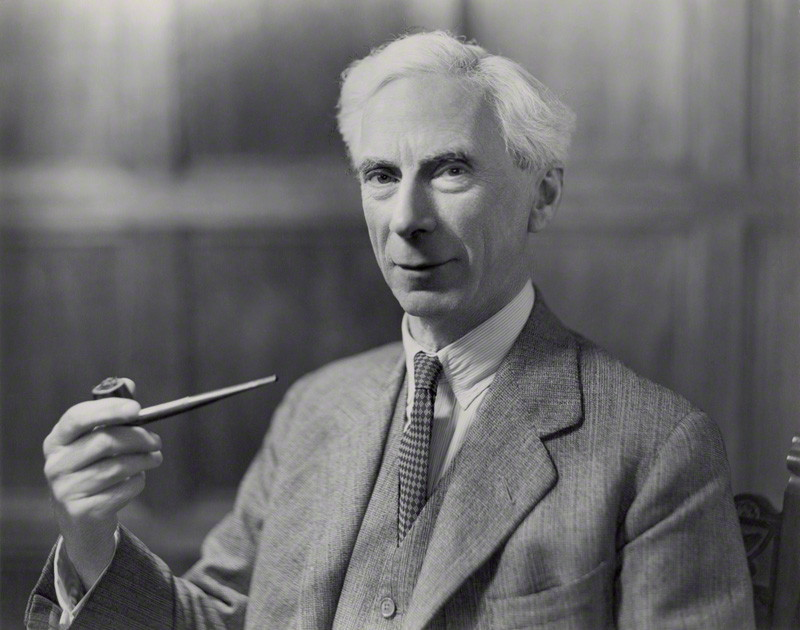
Russell in 1936

McMaster University is home to the Bertrand Russell Archives. Manuscripts, correspondence, newspaper clippings and other textual records, in addition to photographs and audio visual resources, make up the more than 140 meters of material held by the Archives. Russell's personal library and furniture from his home in Penrhyndeudraeth, Wales are also housed at McMaster. Russell's letters, totalling approximately 50,000, provide insight about his personal and political dealings addressing topics such as his love life, his thoughts on teaching and pacifism, and his experiences in prison. Joseph Conrad, T.S. Eliot, Nikita Khrushchev, Lady Constance Malleson, Ho Chi Minh, Jean-Paul Sartre, Ludwig Wittgenstein and Dorothy Maud Wrinch are among Russell's numerous correspondents.

Russell's personal papers were purchased in 1968 for $520,000, with the first transfer of records consisting of 11 filing cabinets and 15 metal trunks. At the time, it was the most money spent on the personal papers of one person, topping what was paid for the personal papers of Leon Trotsky and W. B. Yeats. That a Canadian university was able to secure Russell's papers has been linked to his disapproval of the United States' role in Vietnam. There was, however, interest from American universities, most notably the University of Texas, which dried up after an erroneous report in Newsweek indicated that Russell intended to use the funds to support war efforts in North Vietnam. Selling his papers was, in actuality, a means to support the work of the Bertrand Russell Peace Foundation.
