= McMaster University Library =

Academic library system in Hamilton, Ontario

- 43°15′46″N 79°55′03″W
- Location: Hamilton, Ontario, Canada
- Type: Academic library
- Established: 1887
- Branches: 3

Collection
- Items collected: books; e-books; journals, newspapers, and other serials; sound recordings, videos, and musical scores; maps; manuscripts and archives.
- Size: 1,933,298 volumes (2013): 1,229,351 books; 510,269 e-books; 88,384 journals, newspapers, and other serials; 59,204 sound recordings, videos, and musical scores; 138,142 maps; 4,453 linear metres manuscripts and archives.

Other information
- Budget: Can$20,631,665 (all libraries including Health Sciences)
- Director: Vivian Lewis
- Employees: 100
- Parent organization: McMaster University
- Affiliation: CARL
- Website: library.mcmaster.ca

McMaster University Library is the academic library system for the faculties of Humanities, Social Sciences, Engineering, Science, as well as the Michael DeGroote School of Business at McMaster University in Hamilton, Ontario, Canada. McMaster also has a Health Sciences Library administered by the Faculty of Health Sciences.

== Locations ==
McMaster University Library consists of three locations with distinct subject specialities: Mills Memorial Library (Humanities and Social Sciences), Innis Library (Business), and the H.G. Thode Library of Science and Engineering. The University Library also provides library services at McMaster's Ron Joyce Centre in Burlington, Ontario, Canada.

== History ==
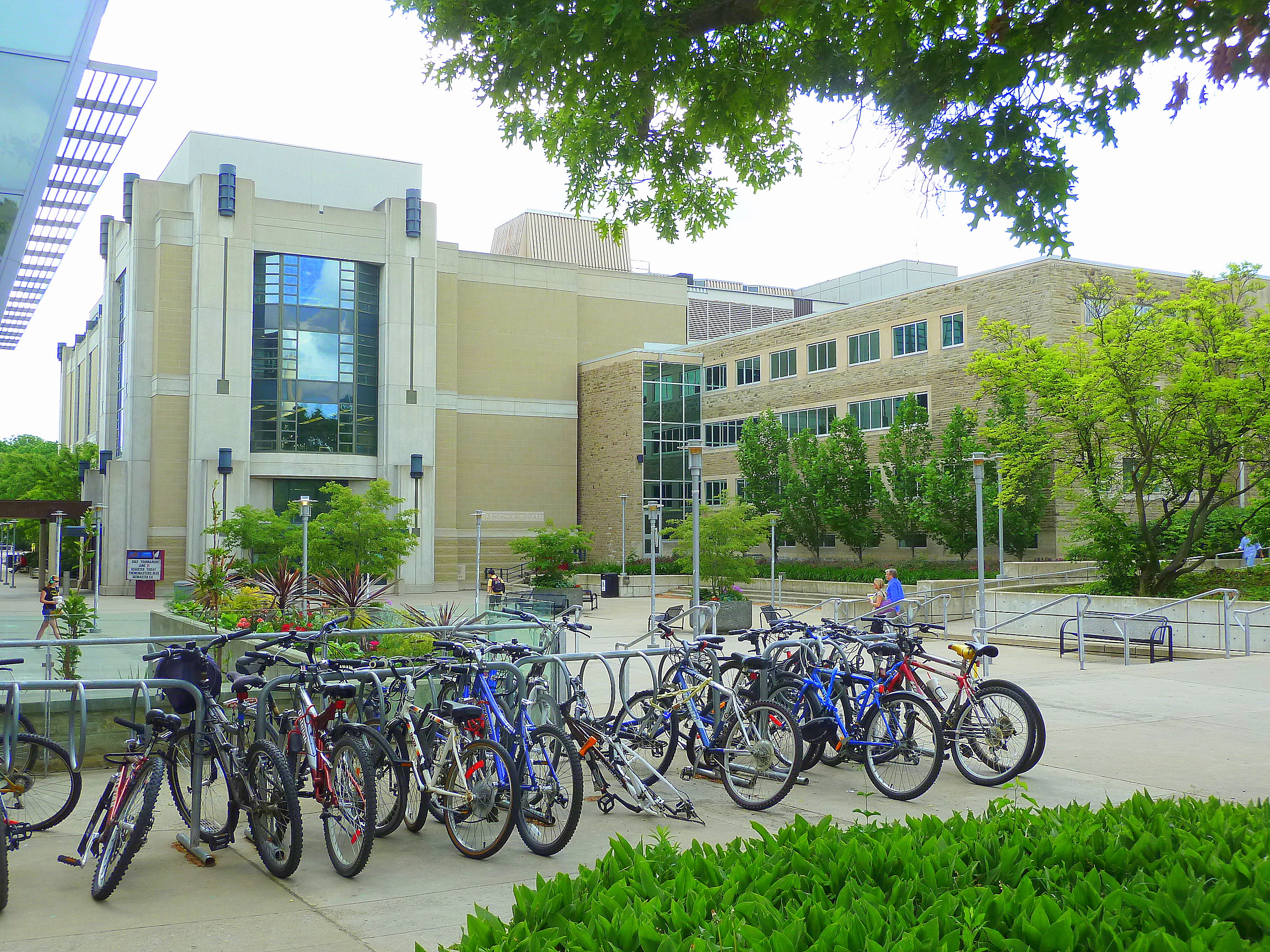
Mills Memorial Library and plaza

The library was established as part of McMaster University in 1887 and was originally located in McMaster Hall in Toronto, Ontario, Canada. When the university and library moved to Hamilton in 1930, the library resided in University Hall, one of the university's five original buildings.

In May 1951, the library moved to the newly constructed Mills Memorial Library, named after David Bloss Mills, whose foundation, the Davella Mills Foundation, funded the construction. Mills was extended to the east in stages during the 1960s and 1970s, and underwent a major renovation from 1990 to 1994.The renovation won the Ontario Library Association 1996 Building Award for Best Academic Library Project. The original Mills Memorial Library building now houses the McMaster Museum of Art.

The university's first Science Library opened as a separate room in Burke Science Building in 1954 and remained there until 1978, when the H.G. Thode Library of Science and Engineering opened. Thode Library was named in honour of scientist Henry George Thode (1910-1997), who was the university's president from 1961 to 1972.

The Innis Library first opened in 1974 and is named after economist and McMaster alumnus Harold Adams Innis (1894–1952). Located in Kenneth Taylor Hall and adjacent to the Michael DeGroote School of Business, it supports the DeGroote School of Business.

The library's most important collection, the Bertrand Russell archives, came to McMaster in 1968. In 1976, McMaster University Library became a member of the Association of Research Libraries, one of only five Canadian libraries at the time.

In 2008, McMaster University Libraries was honoured as one of the three best academic libraries in North America by the American Library Association's ACRL (Association of College and Research Libraries) division. Innovations in services included "open[ing] a help desk in Second Life, implement[ing] the creation of a learning commons," and joining "the Centre for Research Libraries, giving students access to over 800,000 international doctoral dissertations." This is the only time that a Canadian academic library has been given the award.

== Services and centres ==
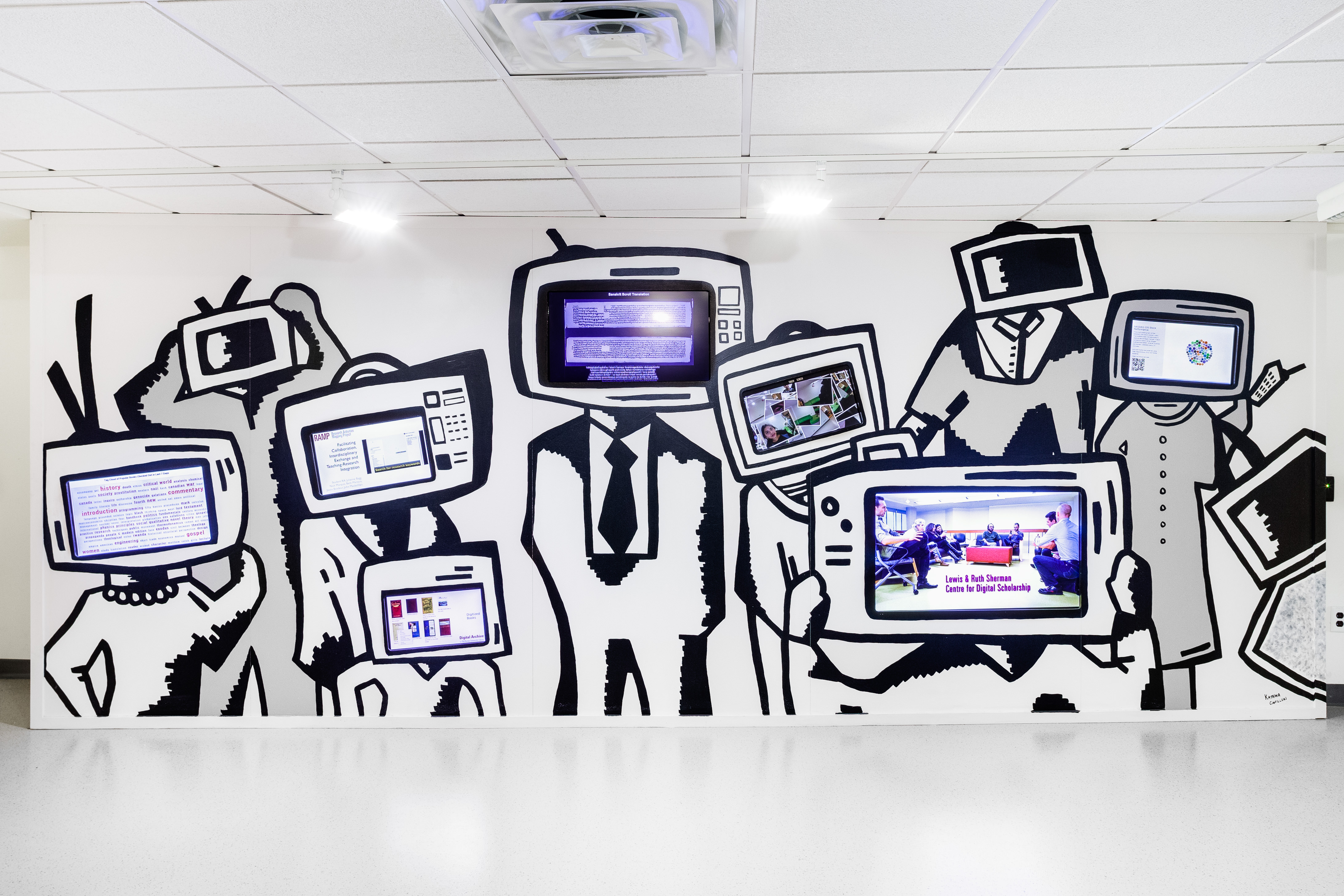
Lewis & Ruth Sherman Centre for Digital Scholarship Media Wall

The McMaster University Library system is home to the Lewis and Ruth Sherman Centre for Digital Scholarship, which opened in 2012 and facilitates open and collaborative approaches to research. Located in the Mills Memorial Library the centre supports students and faculty who employ digital scholarship and digital humanities tools and methodologies in their study and research. "When you have a lot of projects that are literally butting up against each other, the idea is to bleed between them" explains Dale Askey, the centre's Administrative Director, in regards to the potential for interdisciplinary research. The centre includes a makerspace and a 3D printing laboratory. The facility was made possible by a $2.5 million gift from the Lewis & Ruth Sherman Foundation.

The Lyons New Media Centre is also located within the Mills Memorial Library. A specialized multimedia space, the centre facilitates the creation and use of new and traditional media within the academic community while teaching learning and researching. The centre offers video and audio editing workstations, a Gaming and Media Theatre and consultation services.

The Maps, Data & GIS Centre, supplies researchers with access to a geospatial map and data sets and provides workstations with specialized cartographic and statistical software.

== Collections ==
The McMaster University Library's collection supports research in more than 50 doctoral and professional programs. Specialized collections include archives and rare books, data and statistics, government publications, audio and video materials, maps, atlases and aerial photos, music and theses. In 2011, McMaster became the first Canadian university to provide access to the Visual History Archive of the Shoah Foundation Institute, consisting of nearly more than 52,000 testimonials of Holocaust survivors and witnesses.

Named after William Ready (university librarian from 1966 until his retirement in 1979 that was instrumental in acquiring the Bertrand Russell Collection and Canadian Authors and 18th Century Collection), the holdings of the William Ready Division of Archives and Research Collections reflect a range of topics including Canadian literature, politics, popular culture and business history, in addition to war and peace in the 20th century with an emphasis on the Holocaust and Resistance. The Division of Archives and Research Collections is also home to the Bertrand Russell Archives, established after the purchase of Russell's papers in 1968.

1943 wartime map of Hannover, Germany used in the film Fury

The Digital Archive contains special digitized collections, including maps, selected archival materials from Research Collections, and digital copies from the rare books collection.

Digital Collections contains collections of digitized materials such as Historical Perspectives on Canadian Publishing; World War, 1939–1945, German Concentration Camps and Prisons Collection; Digital Russell; and Peace & War in the 20th Century.

The Lloyd Reeds Map Collection holds more than 130,000 paper maps, 18,000 air photos, and 3,000 atlases. Many of the collection's historical maps have been digitized and are freely available online. A digitized copy of a 1943 wartime map of Hanover, Germany, held in the collection was used in the 2014 motion picture Fury. Included in the collection are 1,400 World War I trench maps and aerial photographs. Used by members of the Allied forces the maps were produced in various scales, highlighting terrain, equipment and settlements relevant to specific logistical needs. Several of the maps include annotations and personal information that to convey the real-time experiences of the soldiers who used them.

== Partnerships and collaboration ==
McMaster University Library is a member of the Association of Research Libraries, Canadian Association of Research Libraries, and the Ontario Council of University Libraries.
