= Kings County Museum (Hampton, New Brunswick) =

Museum

Coordinates: 45°31′36″N 65°49′34″W

The Kings County Museum is located in Hampton, New Brunswick and is run by the Kings County Historical and Archival Society, housed in the Centennial Building, with displays also in the old Kings County gaol next door. Late in 1966, with the approach of the Centennial Year, an agreement was made between the Kings County Historical Society, the Municipality of Kings County, and the New Brunswick Centennial Administration to have space for a Museum in the new County Centennial Building in Hampton. The official opening of the Kings County Museum was on June 1, 1968. The museum is home to many artifacts and historical items from Kings County's past, and the main exhibit room is changed to display new artifacts every two (almost consistent) years. Being open for 50+ years, the museum has accumulated an overwhelming amount of artifacts – all with a unique backgrounds involving Kings County. The museum is open in the summertime and certain hours in the wintertime to the public for tours of the exhibit and the old gaol. Guests can explore the many different books and stories about Kings County history that are for sale, and the museum also offers genealogy research. It holds documentations of many place histories in Kings County, family genealogies and more.

== Old County Gaol (Jail) ==
Originally built in 1840 and located in Kingston, the granite blocks of the jail were dismantled and hauled piece by piece from Kingston to Hampton by oxen and horses over road and the ice of the Kennebecasis River in 1871, when Hampton became the new shire-town of Kings County. It was then rebuilt where it now stands and remained in use as a jail until 1971. The building is now owned by the town of Hampton but utilized as part of the Kings County Museum. While some cells remain as they would have been, many of the cells are now set up as theme rooms, displaying some of the 18,000 artifacts in the Museum collection. The jailer and his family lived right next door in an addition made to the original gaol building that is connected by a doorway on the first level. That space is currently being used as the Hampton community library.

== Historical Society ==
The Kings County Historical and Archival Society is dedicated to preserving and interpreting Kings County's interesting history and has been a non-profit organization for over 50 years. The members of the society have worked to record and preserve Kings County heritage through artifacts, research, genealogy documentations and place histories.
