= Law Society of Ontario Archives =

Archive in Toronto, Ontario, Canada

Coordinates: 43.6520°N 79.3857°W

- Established: 1982
- Location: Osgoode Hall, 130 Queen St. W., Toronto, Ontario, Canada, M5H 2N6
- Website: https://lso.ca/about-lso/osgoode-hall-and-ontario-legal-heritage

Osgoode Hall, 1884

The Law Society of Ontario Archives collects and preserves records and other material that documents the history of the legal profession in Ontario. The Archives acquires and preserves records of permanent value to the Law Society of Ontario (formerly the Law Society of Upper Canada), the regulatory body for lawyers and paralegals in the province of Ontario. The Archives also accepts external donations of material that is significant to the legal profession in Ontario. The Archives serves as an information resource centre for Law Society staff, the legal profession, and the public.

== Holdings ==
The bulk of the Archives' holdings are corporate records that document the administration, activities, and functions of the Law Society of Ontario since it was established in 1797.

Charles Holman, 1872?

In addition to corporate records, the Archives accepts donations of non-Law Society records significant to the legal history of Ontario. The Archives currently houses records of over 240 organizations and individuals, such as:

- The Lawyers Club
- William Osgoode
- Sir John Graves Simcoe
- Chief Justice William Goldwin Carrington Howland
- Women's Law Association of Ontario
- Sir John Beverley Robinson
- Essex Law Association
- The Juvenile Advocate Society, an early 18th-century law students' club
- Cyril Frederick Harshaw Carson
- Chief Justice George Alexander Gale
- Toronto Lawyers Association
- Fasken Martineau DuMoulin LLP

The Archives contains over 100,000 photographs, which includes an almost complete set of Osgoode Hall Law School class photographs from 1891 to 1968. The photograph collection also includes photographs of lawyers and judges, various views of Osgoode Hall, and Law Society and legal events.

The Archives also collects printed and published material about or by the Law Society of Ontario (and the Law Society of Upper Canada) that is deemed important. Special Collections includes brochures, special reports, posters, postcards, and ephemera (programmes, menus, invitations, etc.). In addition, the Archives collects periodicals that relate to the Law Society of Ontario or the Ontario legal profession, such as copies of "Obiter Dicta", the Osgoode Hall Law School student newspaper.

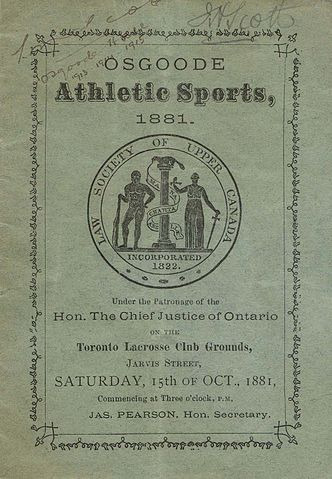
Athletic sports programme, 1881

The Archives' holdings can be searched via an on-line Description Database

== Exhibits ==
Several on-line exhibits have been developed and are available on the Archives' website. Virtual exhibits focus on individuals or legal organizations, Osgoode Hall, or interesting items from the archival collection. The Archives also maintains two display cases, located outside of the Great Library at Osgoode Hall.
