= Archives Association of Ontario =

Professional association

The Archives Association of Ontario (AAO) is a professional network of archives and archivists based in Toronto, Ontario.

== History ==
Focused on advocacy, education and professional development programs, the AAO was formed in 1993 following the amalgamation of the Ontario Association of Archivists and the Ontario Council of Archives. It is one of twelve heritage organizations to receive funding from the Government of Ontario's Provincial Heritage Organization Operating Grant administered by the Ministry of Tourism, Culture and Sport.

In Pursuit of the Archival Endeavour: The Story of the Archives Association of Ontario, an organizational history of the AAO, was published in 2018 in recognition of the association's 25th anniversary. The administrative records of the AAO are held at the Archives of Ontario.

== Operations and services ==
=== Services for archives ===
The AAO operates the Archives Advisor Program which provides remote and on-site support regarding archives management and the preservation of archival holdings. Between the 1991, when the program was established, and 2014 the program's staff made more than 1,000 site visits, and answered about 8,000 requests for assistance.

The organization also hosts training programs, co-ordinates the development of provincial archival practices and organizes an annual conference.

=== Public outreach and advocacy ===
The AAO, and its regional chapters, have organized about 300 events to raise awareness about archival programs, often focused on engaging the public on themes of community heritage, preservation, family genealogy and public memory. The AAO also maintains Archeion, an online portal that provides researchers with information about member archives throughout Ontario. The AAO has also sponsored local public events celebrating Archives Awareness Day in the province.

=== Publications ===
The AAO releases publications related to the subject of archiving, including Carolyn Bart-Reidstra's 2009 book Archives for Genealogy: A beginner's Guide. The organization also publishes Off the Record a quarterly publication focused on news and events within Ontario's archival community.

=== Awards ===
The AAO administers five awards in recognition of individual and organizational achievement related to archival theory and practice: AAO Emerging Leader Award, Alexander Fraser Award, Corporate Award, Institutional Award, James J. Talman Award. Previous winners include the Shingwauk Residential Schools Centre, the William Ready Division of Archives and Research Collections, the Clara Thomas Archives & Special Collections, and University of Toronto professor Heather MacNeil.

The AAO also administers the Shirley Spragge Bursary, named after former Queen's University Archivist Shirley Spragge. Given out annually, the award helps cover costs associated with attending the annual AAO conference.
