= Winnipeg arts and culture =

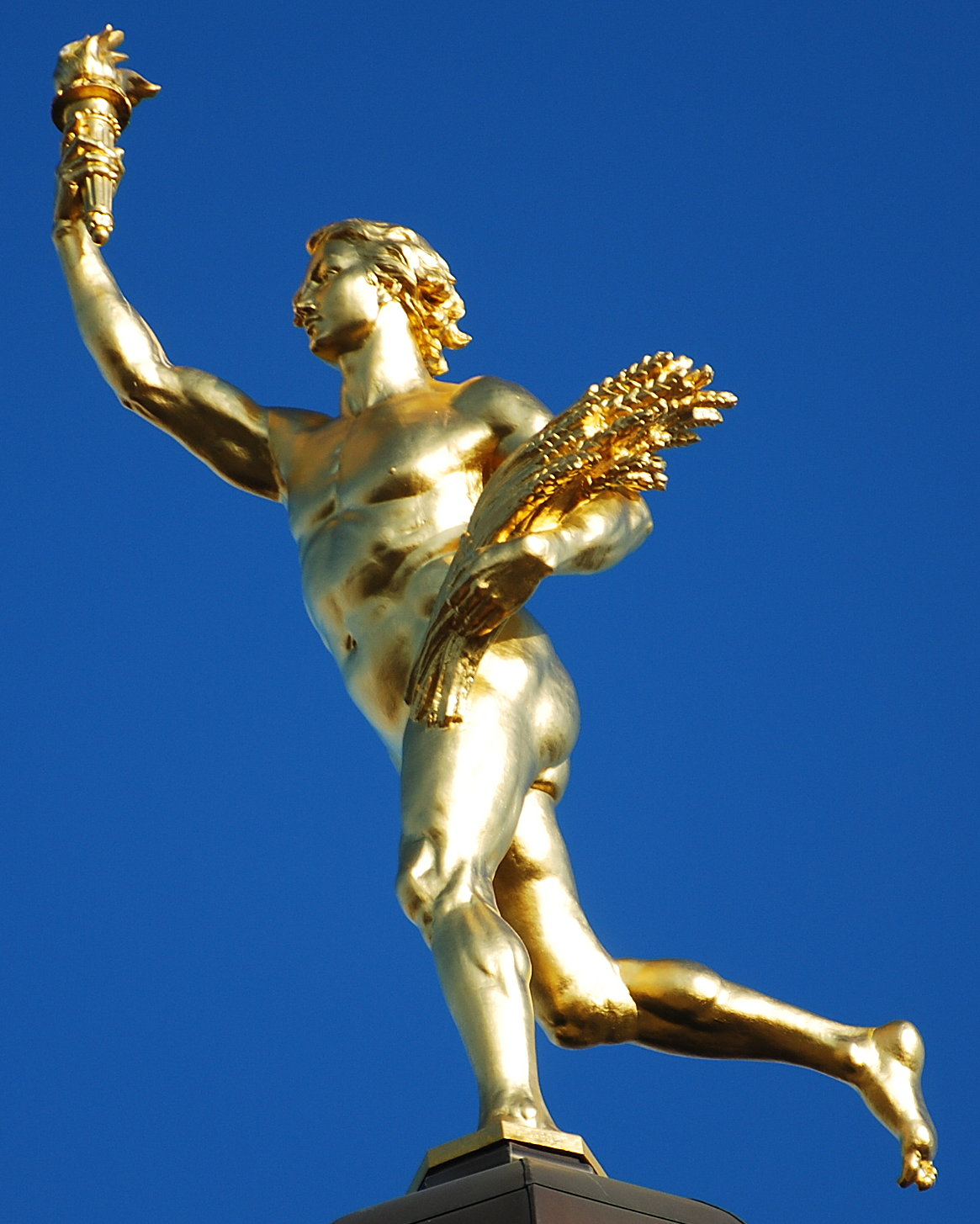
The Golden Boy statue

Winnipeg is well known across the prairies for its arts and culture.

== Architecture ==
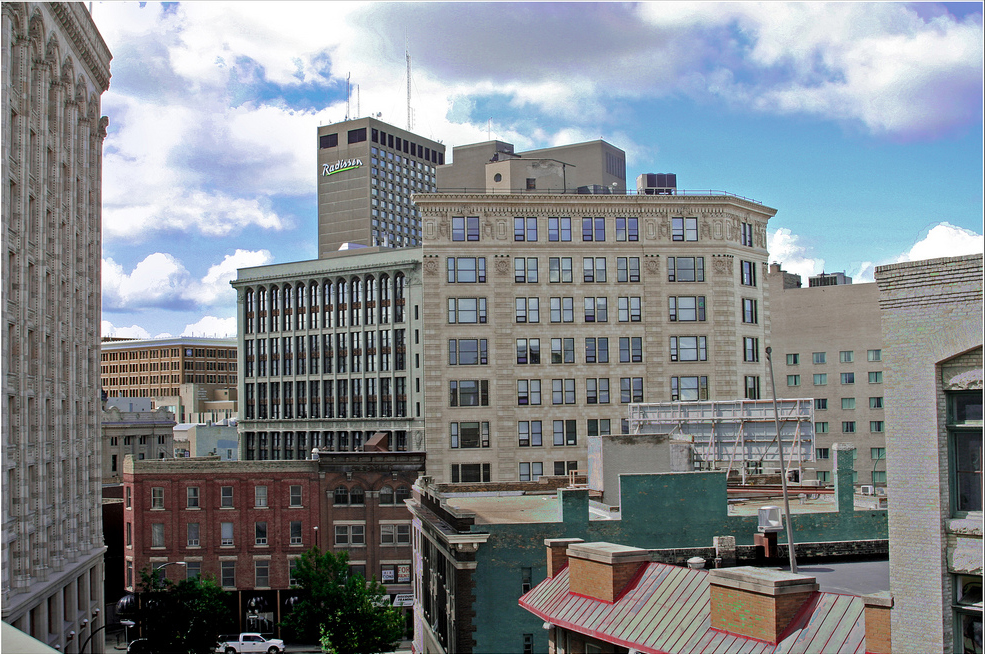
The Exchange District

After the railways came to Winnipeg, the Exchange District area was developed with many fine warehouses, offices and banks and became the original site of commerce in Winnipeg. Many of these buildings are still standing and are unrivalled in Canada. The district illustrates the city's key role as a centre of grain and wholesale trade, finance and manufacturing in two historically important periods in western development: between 1880 and 1900 when Winnipeg became the gateway to Canada's West; and between 1900 and 1913, when the city's growth made it the region's metropolis. On 22 September 1997, the Exchange District was declared a National Historic Site of Canada by the federal Minister of Canadian Heritage.

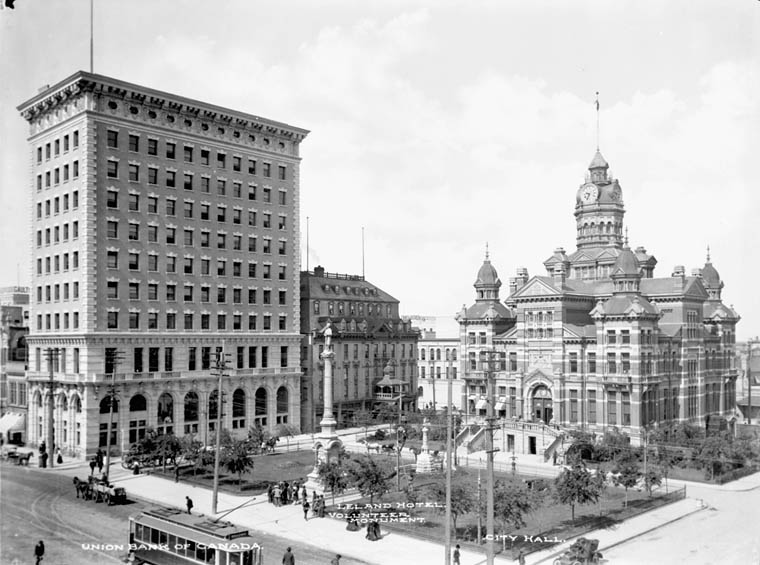
Union Bank Building, Leland Hotel, Volunteer Monument and City Hall

In the Exchange District stands the Union Bank Building, Canada's oldest skyscraper. Begun in 1903 and opened in November 1904, the 10-storey building was Winnipeg's first skyscraper south of City Hall, and was the tallest building in Winnipeg at the time of its construction. The Union Bank Tower is an example of the Chicago Style.

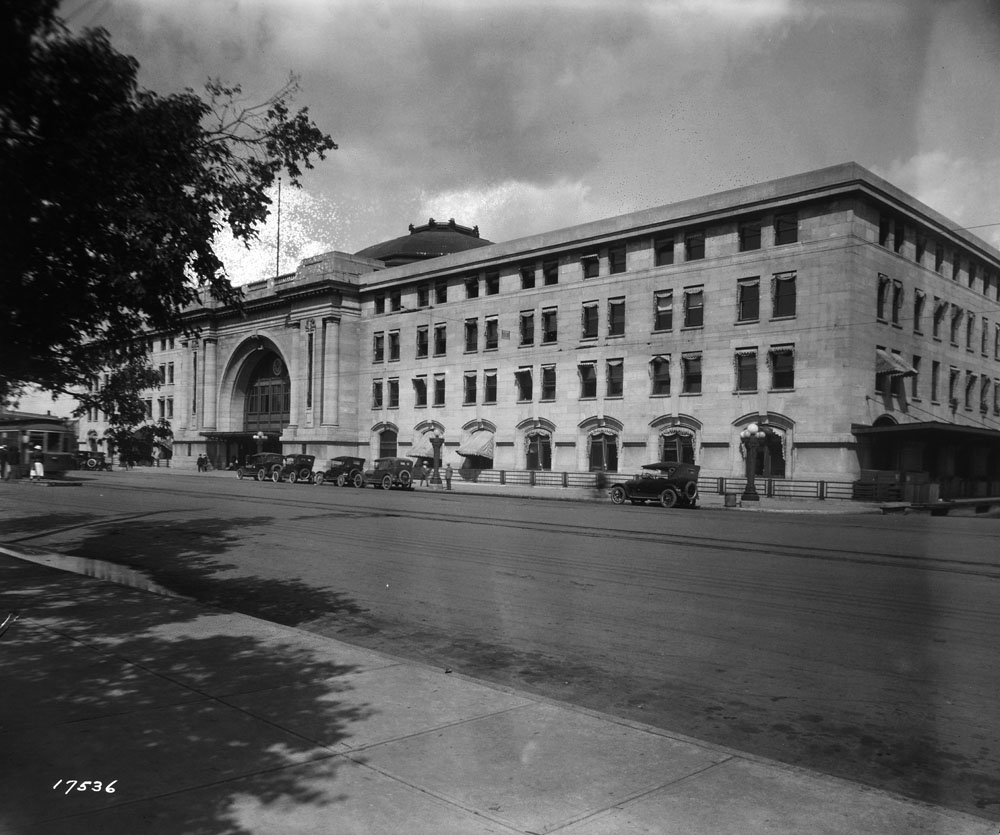
Historical photo of Union Station in Winnipeg

Union Station is the inter-city railway station situated near The Forks. It is a grand beaux-arts structure, and was designated a National Historic Site of Canada in 1976. Union Station was designed by Warren and Wetmore, the architects responsible for Grand Central Station in New York City. Designed in the Beaux-Arts style and constructed from local Tyndall limestone, Union Station was one of Western Canada's largest railway stations.

The Manitoba Legislative Building is the meeting place of the Legislative Assembly of Manitoba, in central Winnipeg. It was originally named the Manitoba Parliament Building, not Legislative. The neoclassical building was completed in 1920 and stands seventy-seven meters tall (253 ft). It was designed and built by Frank Worthington Simon (1862–1933) and Henry Boddington III, along with other masons and many skilled craftsmen. The building is famous for the Golden Boy, a gold covered bronze statue based on the style of the Roman god Mercury, or the Greek god Hermes, at the top of the cupola, or domed ceiling.

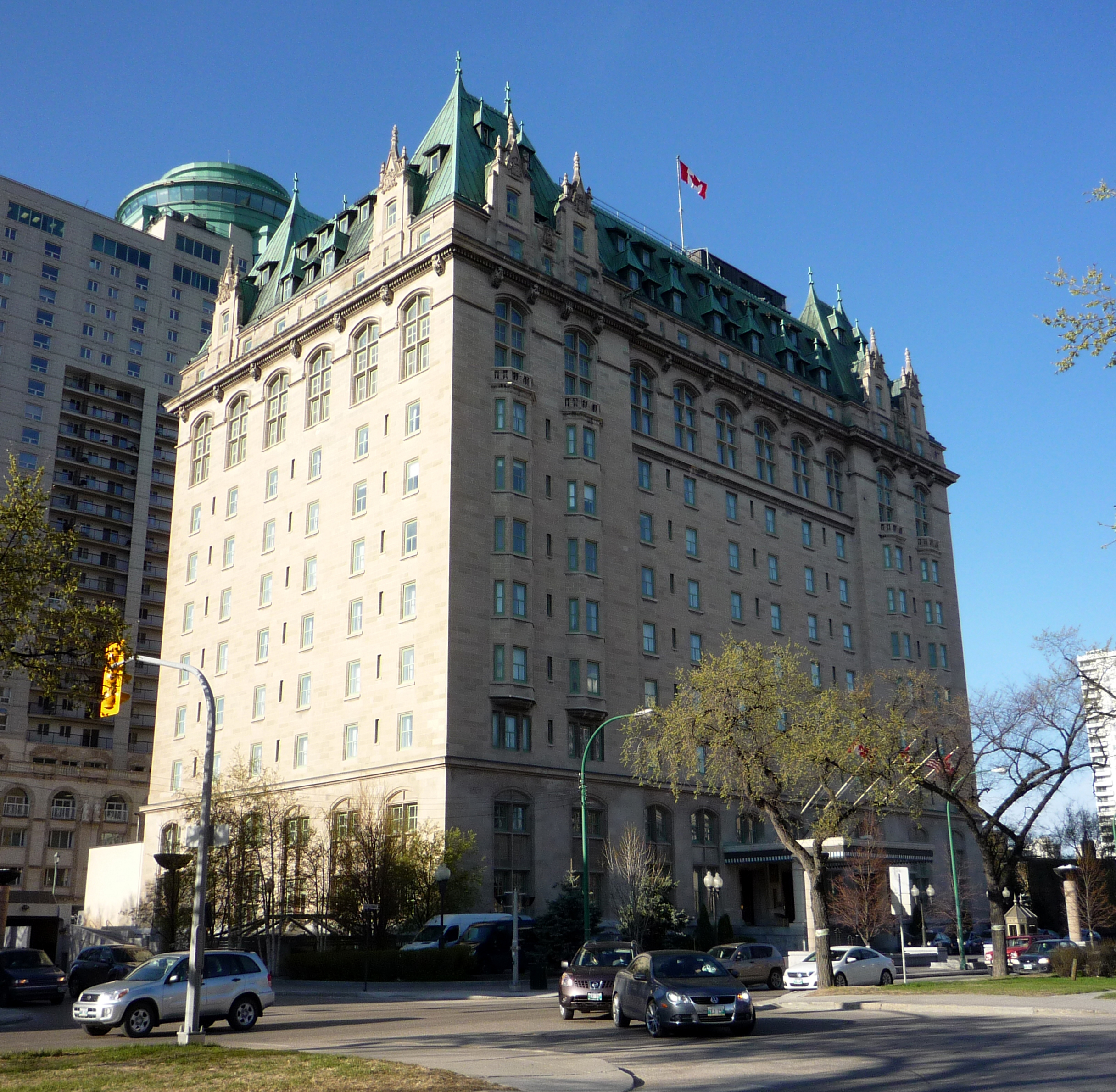
Fort Garry Hotel in Winnipeg

The Fort Garry Hotel is one of Canada's grand railway hotels. Built in 1913 by the Grand Trunk Pacific Railway, it is located one block from the railway's Union Station, and was the tallest structure in the city when it was completed. Like other Canadian railway hotels, it was constructed in the "château style" (also termed the "neo-château" or "châteauesque" style), which as a result the hotels became known as a distinctly Canadian form of architecture. The design reflects the François I style of hotel which became prevalent in the eastern United States at the turn-of-the-20th-century. Henry Janeway Hardenbergh initiated the architectural trend, with New York City's Plaza Hotel (1906–07) as his most well known structure. The Fort Garry Hotel has more than a passing similarity to The Plaza, related features include: the classic base, shaft, and capital divisions of the skyscraper; flat facades with slightly projecting, four-bay end pavilions; an arcade of large, segmented windows below a prominent cornice; and, the composition of the steeply sloped roofs. Architects Ross and MacFarlane of Montreal modeled their original plans for the hotel after Ottawa's Château Laurier; plans originally called for a 10-storey structure, but two floors were added during construction.

The commercial main street of Winnipeg's famous North End, Selkirk Avenue, first saw development in the 1870s and its importance grew with a wave of immigration from Eastern Europe. The old country flavour of the neighbourhood still exists with a variety of boutiques, bakeries and butcher shops. This area also has 49 painted murals, each depicting a different multicultural and historical scene.

The University of Manitoba School of Architecture, the second such program to exist in Canada, was established in 1913. Its first director was Arthur A. Stoughton, a graduate of Columbia University. By the 1950s the University of Manitoba architecture program was a leading Canadian institution in the popularization of modern architecture. In the years since its foundation the University of Manitoba School of Architecture (now the Faculty of Architecture) has been a key influence in the development of Winnipeg's architecture. Some of the Faculty's better-known graduates include John and Patricia Patkau, Richard Henriquez, John C. Parkin, Etienne Gaboury, Bill Allen, and Harry Seidler (winner of the 1996 Royal Institute of British Architects Royal Gold Metal).

== Media ==
=== Newspapers ===
Winnipeg's daily newspapers include the Winnipeg Free Press and the Winnipeg Sun. The city is also home to three student newspapers, including The Manitoban at the University of Manitoba, The Uniter at the University of Winnipeg, and The Projector, published by the Red River College Polytechnic Students' Association. Winnipeg's alternative weekly Uptown became an arts and entertainment supplement to the Winnipeg Free Press in November 2012. Canstar Community News combined its six community newspapers into the East and West editions of the Free Press Community Review in January 2022; the publication closed in July 2026.

=== Magazines ===
There are two Winnipeg magazines published quarterly by Studio Publications. Winnipeg Women and Winnipeg Men magazines feature local individuals, businesses and services. There is also a monthly publication, known as Where Winnipeg, which includes travel information, upcoming events and reviews.

Other magazines published in Winnipeg include Border Crossings: A Magazine of the Arts, Canadian Dimension, Herizons and OutWords.

=== Television stations ===
Winnipeg has six television stations that viewers can watch free with an antenna. Five broadcast in English, including CBC, CTV, Global, Citytv and FaithTV. The sixth, Ici Radio-Canada Télé, broadcasts in French.

The city is also home to the Aboriginal Peoples Television Network (APTN), which carries Indigenous programming for audiences across Canada. Its sister channel, APTN Languages, launched in 2024 and offers programming in Indigenous languages. Rogers tv Winnipeg provides community television programming.

=== Radio stations ===
Winnipeg offers a mix of commercial, public and community radio stations. Listeners can find news, talk shows and music ranging from pop, rock and country to classical and jazz. CBC/Radio-Canada provides news, talk and music in both English and French.

Several stations focus on the city's cultural and language communities. Envol 91 broadcasts in French, while CKJS and U Radio offer programs in multiple languages. NCI-FM and ziibi 104.7 serve Indigenous audiences. CKUW at the University of Winnipeg and UMFM at the University of Manitoba carry campus and community programs. CJNU focuses on older popular music.

== Cuisine ==
A relatively isolated community for much of its early history, Winnipeg has developed several indigenous dishes and numerous local interpretations of imported ones. Wafer pie, a staple dessert in the Canadian prairies, can still be found in many homesteads around the city as well as in grocery stores.

Winnipeg is also the birthplace of the schmoo torte, a pecan and butterscotch cake which has its origins in the city's Jewish community.

Another very interesting dessert to be found in the Peg is vínarterta, a confection of Icelandic origin. Manitoba has a large Icelandic-Canadian population, and Winnipeg in particular hosts a strong group at its core, which has influenced the city's cuisine just as much as the Ukrainian, Polish and Russian Mennonite immigrants have. However, this Icelandic cake is virtually forgotten in its country of origin, and has thus devolved into a distinctly Canadian dish. In Winnipeg, vínarterta is traditionally a multilayer cake made of cookie-like dough with a prune-based filling, but many recipe variations occur from family to family. Often, prunes and dates are mixed to form a filling, while the dough is usually flavoured with cardamom, ginger or cinnamon. Icing can vary from a simple butter cream confection to marzipan, although some traditionalists eschew any icing whatsoever.

Winnipeg has also developed its own distinct take on many foods, including its own styles of rye bread and "Co-op" cream cheese. Winnipeg-style rye is very light compared to most other forms of rye and is made by the Winnipeg Rye Bread, City Bread and Kub bakeries and can be found in any grocery store.

Pierogi and kielbasa are also extremely common in all Winnipeg delis. In the old French-Canadian neighborhood of St. Boniface, yellow pea soup, tourtière and sugar pie can be found in abundance, especially in February during the Festival du Voyageur. In the wintertime, a drink called caribou is also consumed.

New waves of immigrants are further contributing to Winnipeg's dining scene. For example, the increasingly large Filipino population has made popular dishes such as lumpia and pancit.

Although Winnipeg boasts a huge number of ethnic restaurants - especially around Selkirk Avenue, Corydon Avenue, and The Forks - its First Nations heritage continues to influence the city's cuisine and culture. As in all of Manitoba, but especially up north, Winnipeg is host to a large amount of locally grown and caught produce. Bannock is a popular pastry, and is seeing a resurgence among Winnipeg's non-First Nations population. Wild rice is ubiquitous across the city and the province, often served with game dishes like caribou or bison due to its nutty flavor. Blueberries, and saskatoons in particular, are often used as fillings in pies and other desserts.

The First Nations tradition of smoking was gradually perfected and modernized in Winnipeg from the mid to late-19th century onwards, partially due to the influx of European and other Canadian immigrants. Whitefish, sauger and tullibee are common choices, but the favourite fish of most Winnipeggers are walleye, which locals still call "pickerel", and goldeye. Smoked goldeye has become somewhat synonymous with Manitoba throughout Canada. Goldeye is traditionally smoked over debarked willow branches, although some restaurants and fisheries in Winnipeg use oak chips and red dye, such as the Gimli Fish Market. Goldeye is always eaten smoked, and often on crackers or on rye with Winnipeg Co-op style cream cheese. Cisco (tullibee) is sometimes known as the "poor man's goldeye", but it is still smoked and sold at numerous fish markets in the city. Pickerel is another common fish used in Winnipeg cuisine. The cheeks are the most desirable part of the fish, and a classic Winnipeg dish is to have them served pan-fried in butter with mashed potatoes, creamed corn and pickled beets, although certain establishments such as Beach Boy restaurant in Gimli offer pickerel with fries and Greek salad alongside their variation of the locally famous Fat Boy burger.

The Fat Boy is a Winnipeg style of hamburger, consisting of one or more patties, topped with meat sauce, quartered dill pickles, tomatoes, lettuce and a large amount of mayonnaise and mustard with fresh-cut fries. Innumerable varieties exist at the many drive-ins around the city, each with a loyal following. Some of the oldest restaruants in Winnipeg, such as VJ's Drive Inn and Dairi-Wip have been serving this dish for generations.

Honey dill sauce is popular as a dipping sauce for chicken fingers as well sweet potato fries.

== Writers and novelists ==
There have been many famous writer and novelists who have called Winnipeg home over the years. Some were born in Winnipeg, some raised in Winnipeg and some have re-located to Winnipeg. One of Canada's most important Francophone writers was Gabrielle Roy who was born in the St. Boniface neighborhood. Her books helped fuel the Quiet Revolution in Quebec. In her lifetime, she was awarded the Governor General's Award and in 1967, she became a Companion of the Order of Canada.

Winnipeg's first Poet Laureate was Di Brandt. The current Poet Laureate is Duncan Mercredi.

=== Winnipeg writers ===
==== Fiction and humour ====
- David Arnason, novelist
- David Bergen, novelist
- Sandra Birdsell, novelist
- Ralph Connor, novelist
- Paul Hiebert, humourist
- Margaret Laurence, novelist
- Beatrice Mosionier, novelist.
- David A. Robertson, novelist and graphic novelist.
- Carol Shields, novelist
- Joan Thomas, novelist
- Miriam Toews, novelist
- Andrew Unger, novelist and satirist
- A. E. van Vogt, science fiction writer
- Joshua Whitehead, novelist and poet.
- Armin Wiebe, novelist

==== Francophone writers ====
- Gabrielle Roy, novelist

==== Poetry ====
- Di Brandt, poet and essayist.
- Dennis Cooley, poet.
- Rosanna Deerchild, poet, playwright and broadcaster.
- Patrick Friesen, poet.
- Catherine Hunter, poet and novelist.
- Chandra Mayor, poet and novelist.
- Duncan Mercredi, poet and storyteller.
- Chimwemwe Undi, poet and lawyer.
- Katherena Vermette, poet and novelist.

==== Children's and young adult literature ====
- Paulette Bourgeois, creator of Franklin the Turtle
- Anita Daher, young adult writer
- Carol Matas, young adult writer
- David Robertson, writer

==== Non-fiction and criticism ====
- Marshall McLuhan, media theorist

== Film and television production ==
Winnipeg is home to a number of acclaimed filmmakers such as Guy Maddin, whose feature My Winnipeg is a stylized tribute to his hometown. Noam Gonick, whose feature on Winnipeg street gangs Stryker (2004) premiered at the 61st Venice Film Festival and Adam Smoluk, whose grocery store based caper-comedy Foodland played across Canada on Super Channel. Other Winnipeg filmmakers include animators Richard Condie and Cordell Barker, who often work with the National Film Board of Canada's Prairie Centre studio, as does documentary filmmaker John Paskievich. From 2005-2008, the Atelier national du Manitoba filmmaking and art project produced films and other media pertaining to the history and culture of Winnipeg and Manitoba.

== Performing arts ==
=== Dance ===
- Dance Manitoba
- Royal Winnipeg Ballet
- Rusalka Ukrainian Dance Ensemble

=== Music ===
==== Jazz and rock ====
The touring Creole Band performed at Winnipeg's Pantages Playhouse Theatre in 1914, in what has been described as Canada's first jazz concert. Rock musicians and bands associated with Winnipeg include Bachman–Turner Overdrive, Crash Test Dummies, The Guess Who, The Weakerthans and Neil Young.

==== Composers ====
Composers who have worked in Winnipeg include:

- Pat Carrabré
- Gordon Fitzell
- Jim Hiscott
- Michael Matthews
- Diana McIntosh
- Bill Pura
- Örjan Sandred

==== Music organizations ====
- Camerata Nova
- Canzona, a choir performing Baroque music
- GroundSwell, a contemporary music organization
- Manitoba Chamber Orchestra
- Manitoba Opera
- Prairie Voices, a youth choir
- Renaissance Voices, a chamber choir
- Rosamunde Summer Music Academy, a string music camp
- Winnipeg Chamber Music Society
- Winnipeg Singers
- Winnipeg Symphony Orchestra

=== Theatre ===
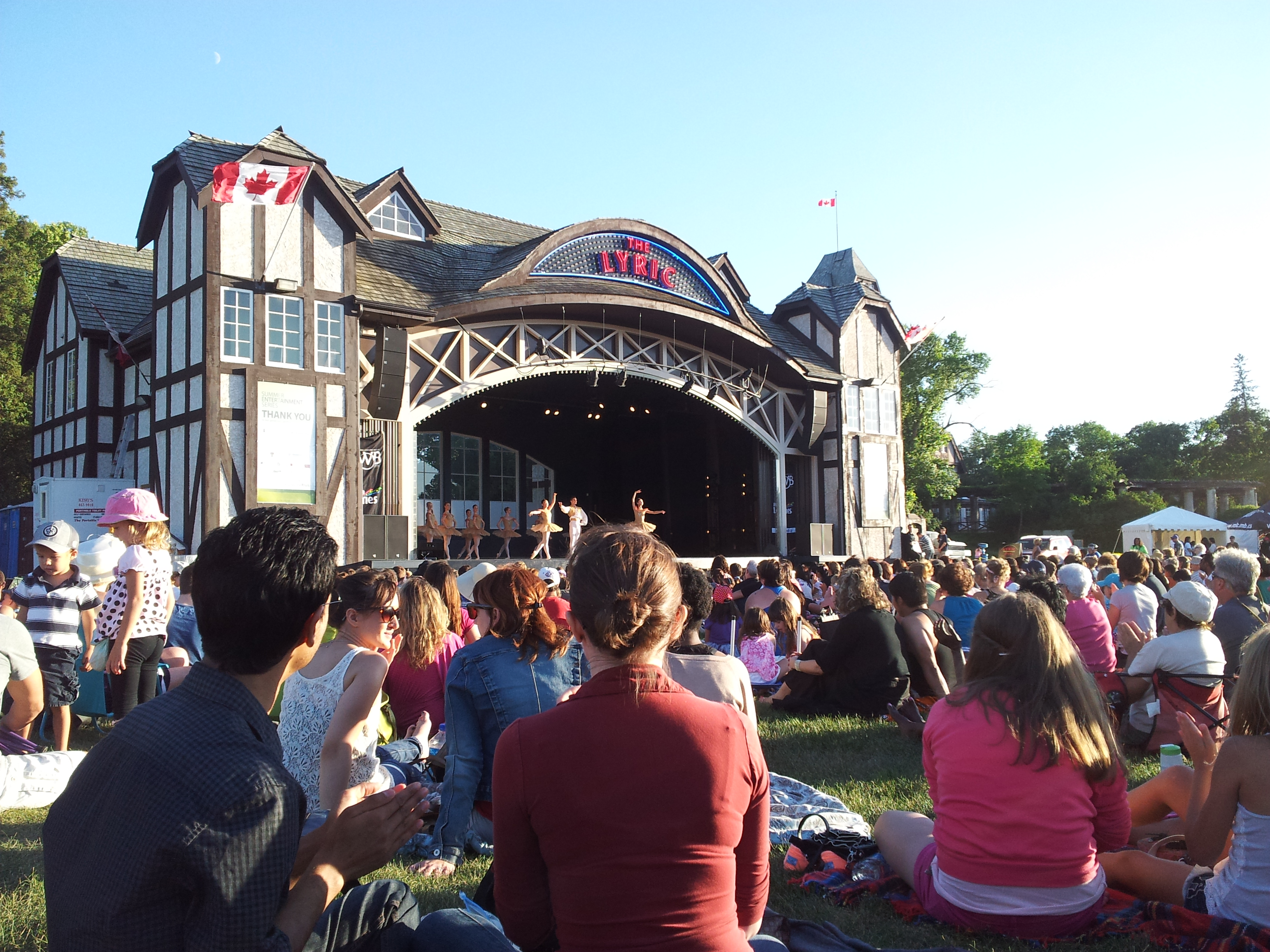
Lyric Stage at the Assiniboine Park Pavilion

- Celebrations Dinner Theatre
- Fantasy Theatre for Children
- Le Cercle Molière
- Manitoba Theatre for Young People
- Merlyn Productions Theatre Company
- Prairie Theatre Exchange
- Rainbow Stage
- Royal Manitoba Theatre Centre
- Shakespeare in the Ruins
- Theatre Projects Manitoba
- Winnipeg Jewish Theatre

== Museums, galleries and heritage sites ==
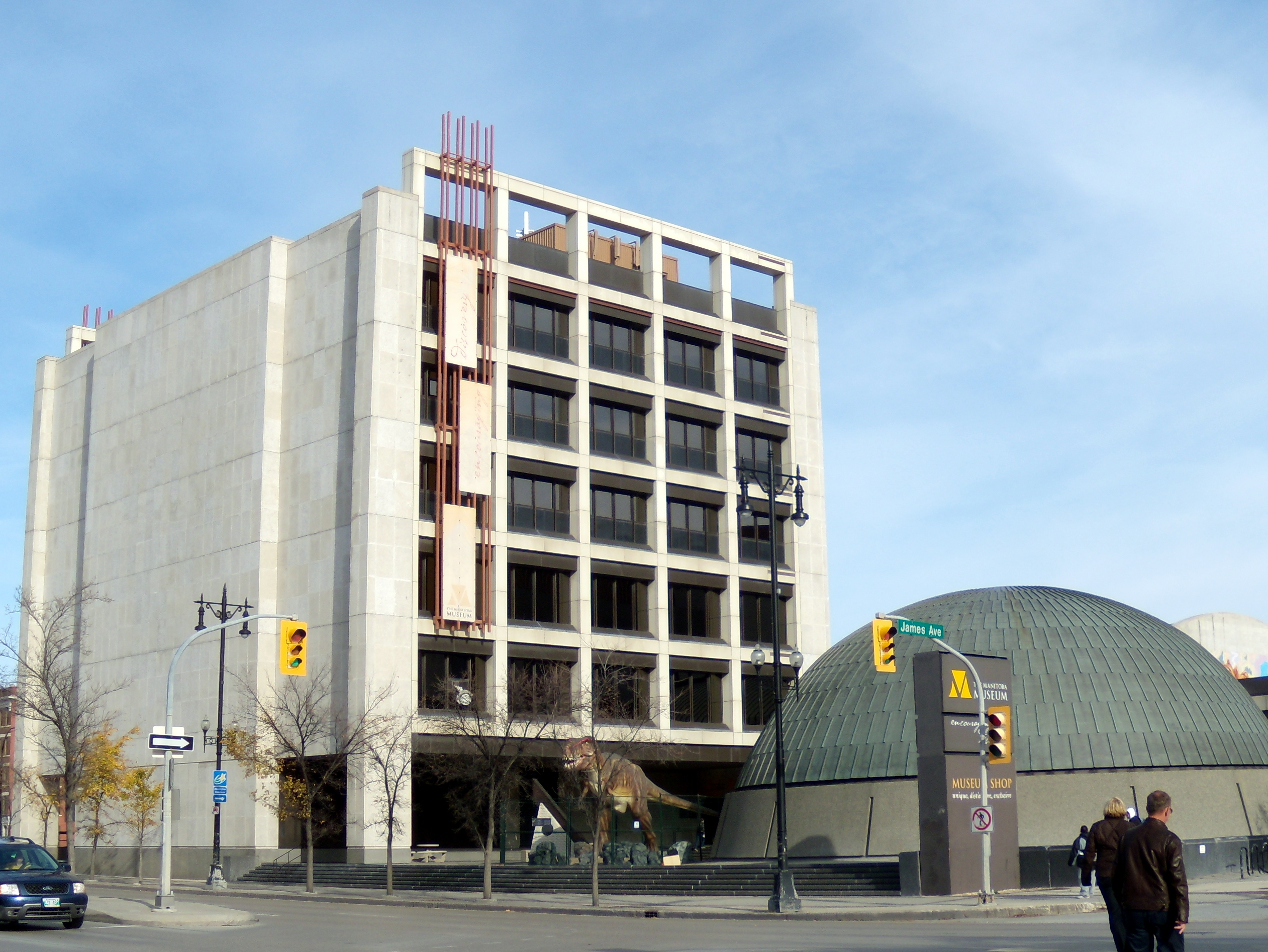
The Manitoba Museum and Planetarium

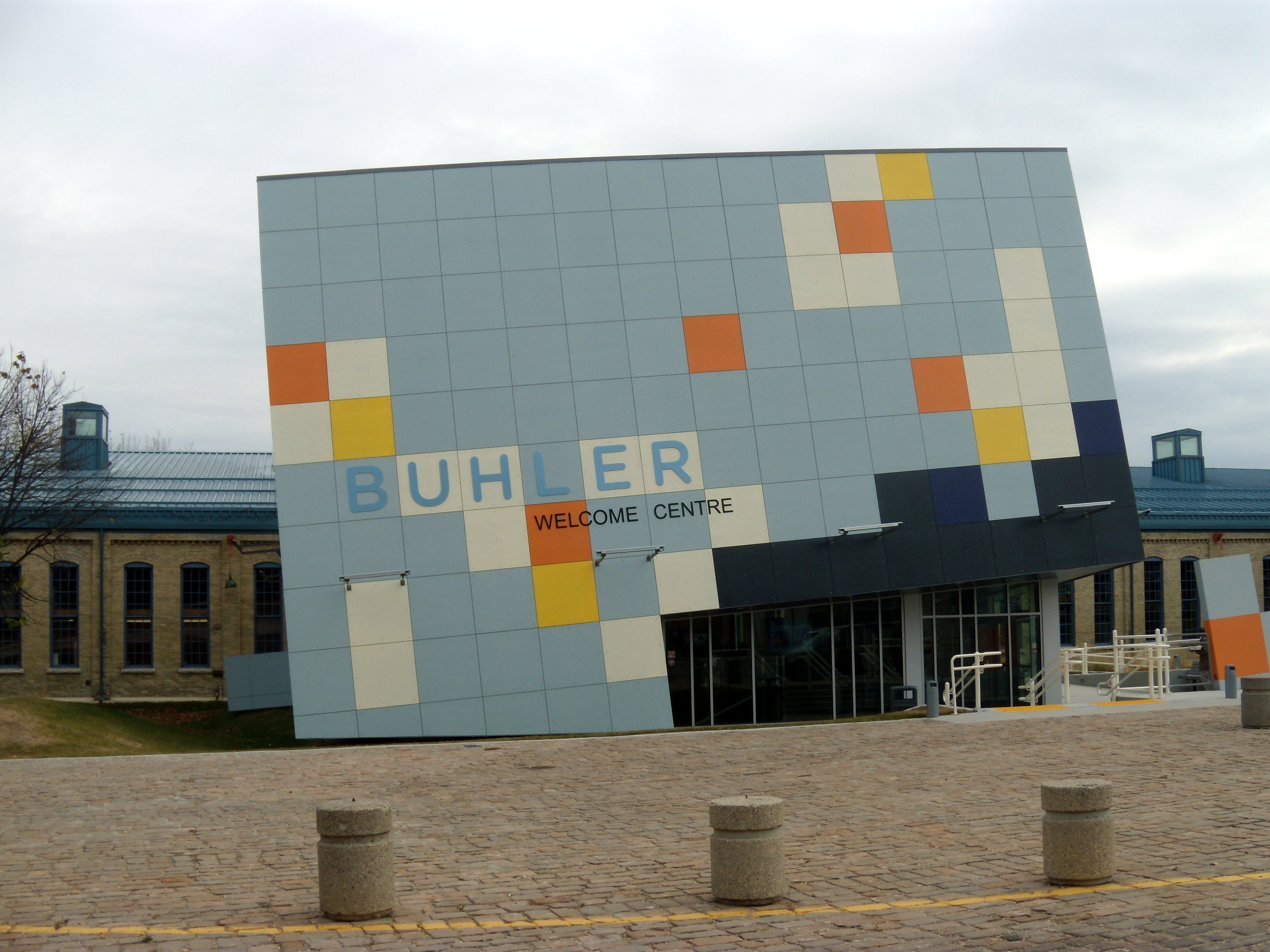
The Manitoba Children's Museum at The Forks

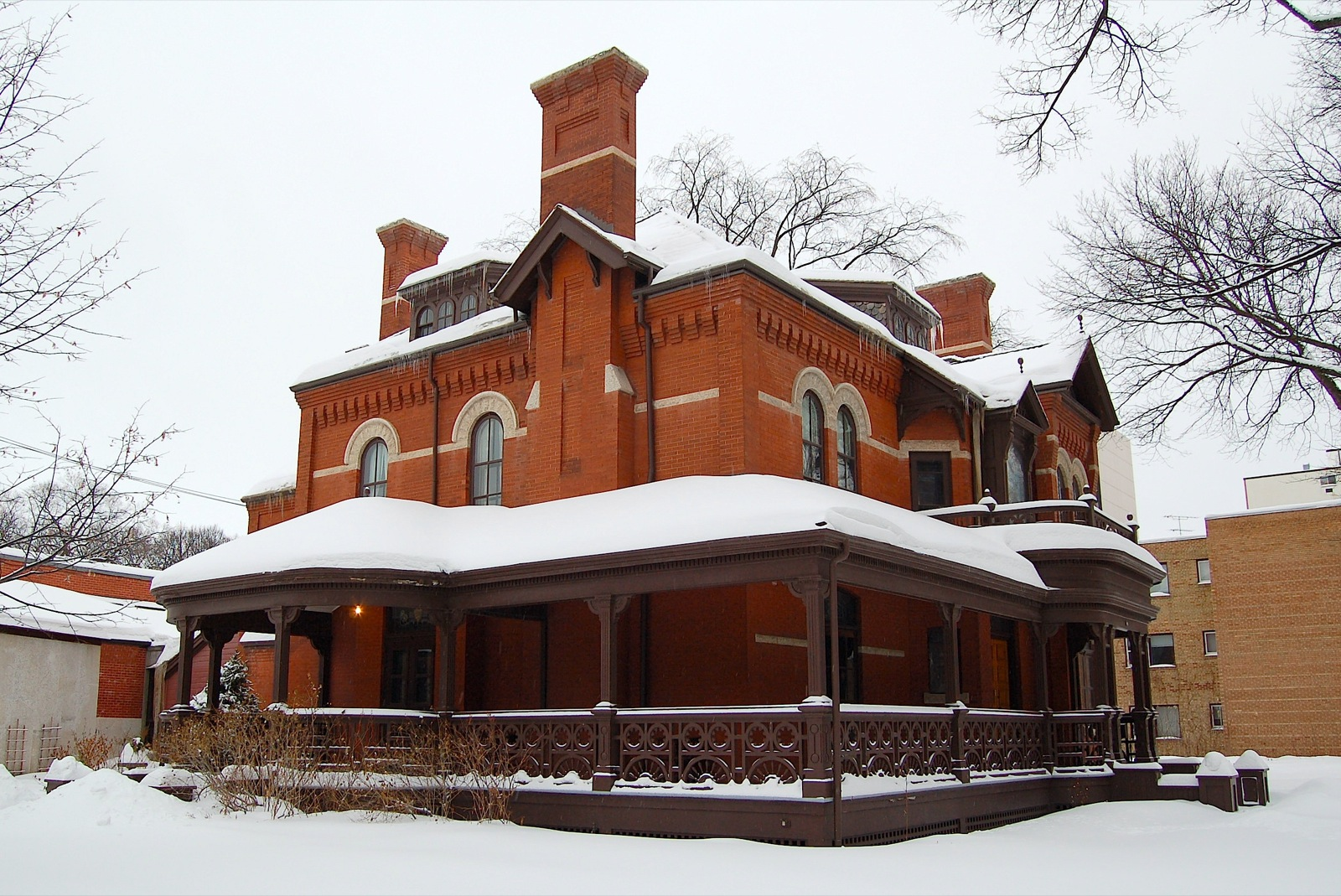
Dalnavert Museum

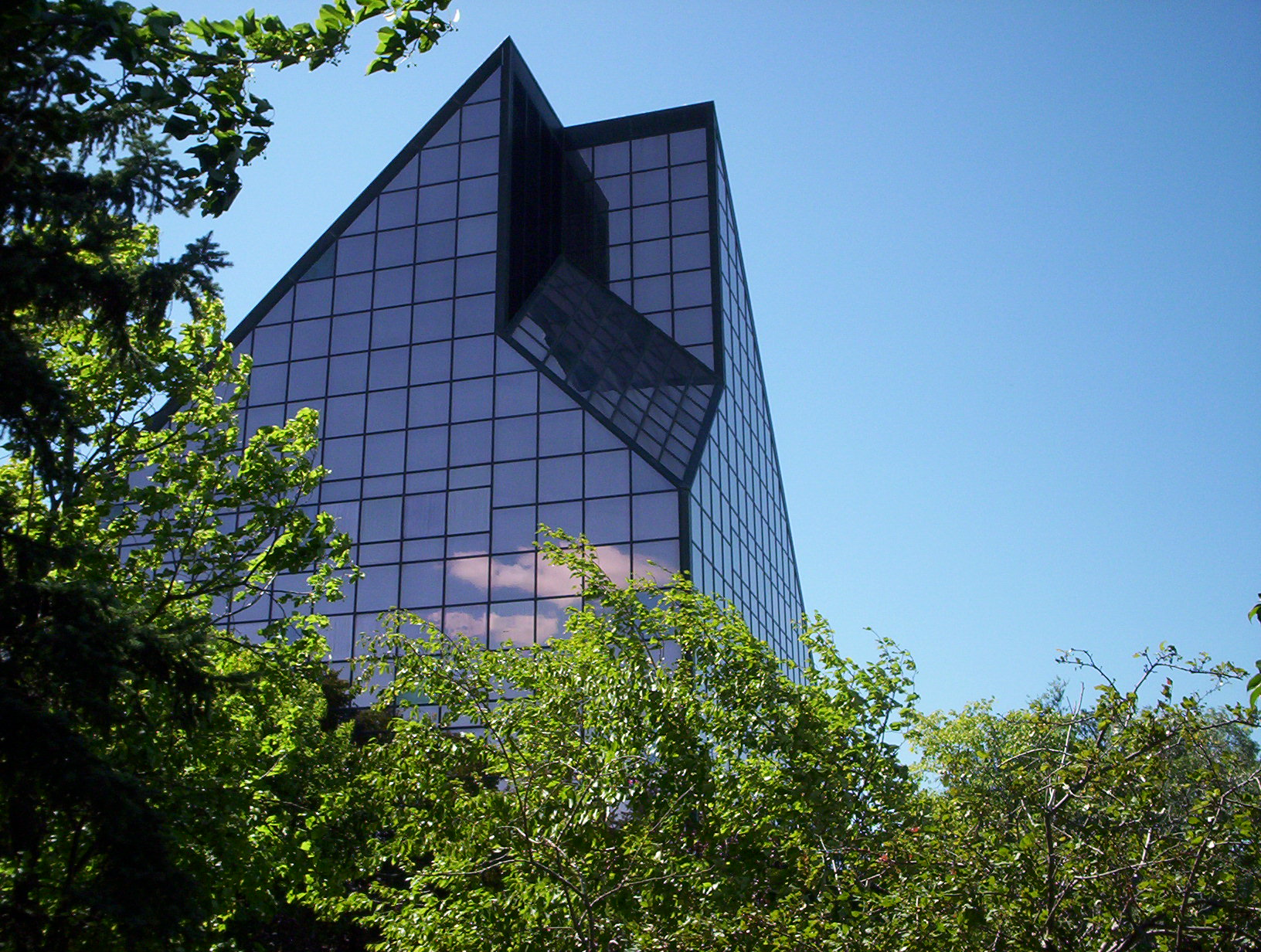
The Royal Canadian Mint in Winnipeg

=== Art and crafts ===
- Gallery 1C03 at the University of Winnipeg
- Gallery One One One and FitzGerald Study Centre
- Manitoba Crafts Museum and Library
- Pavilion Gallery Museum
- Winnipeg Art Gallery

=== Children's museums ===
- Manitoba Children's Museum

=== Cultural heritage ===
- Ivan Franko Museum
- Jewish Heritage Centre
- La Maison Gabrielle Roy
- Le Musée de Saint-Boniface Museum
- Ogniwo Polish Museum Society
- St. Volodymyr Museum
- Ukrainian Cultural & Educational Centre

=== History and heritage ===
- Canadian Museum for Human Rights
- Dalnavert
- Fort Garry Historical Society – St. Norbert Provincial Heritage Park
- Historical Museum of St. James–Assiniboia
- Hudson's Bay Company Archives
- Ross House Museum
- Seven Oaks House Museum
- St. Vital Historical Society
- Transcona Historical Museum

=== Military, transport and industry ===
- Fire Fighters Museum
- Fort Garry Horse Museum and Archives
- Manitoba Electrical Museum
- Naval Museum of Manitoba
- Queen's Own Cameron Highlanders of Canada Museum
- Royal Canadian Mint
- Western Canada Aviation Museum
- Winnipeg Police Museum
- Winnipeg Railway Museum, operated by the Mid-Western Rail Association

=== Science and natural history ===
- Ed Leith Cretaceous Menagerie
- Living Prairie Museum
- Manitoba Museum
- Robert B. Ferguson Museum of Mineralogy

=== Sports ===
- Aquatic Hall of Fame and Museum of Canada
- Manitoba Sports Hall of Fame and Museum

== Festivals ==
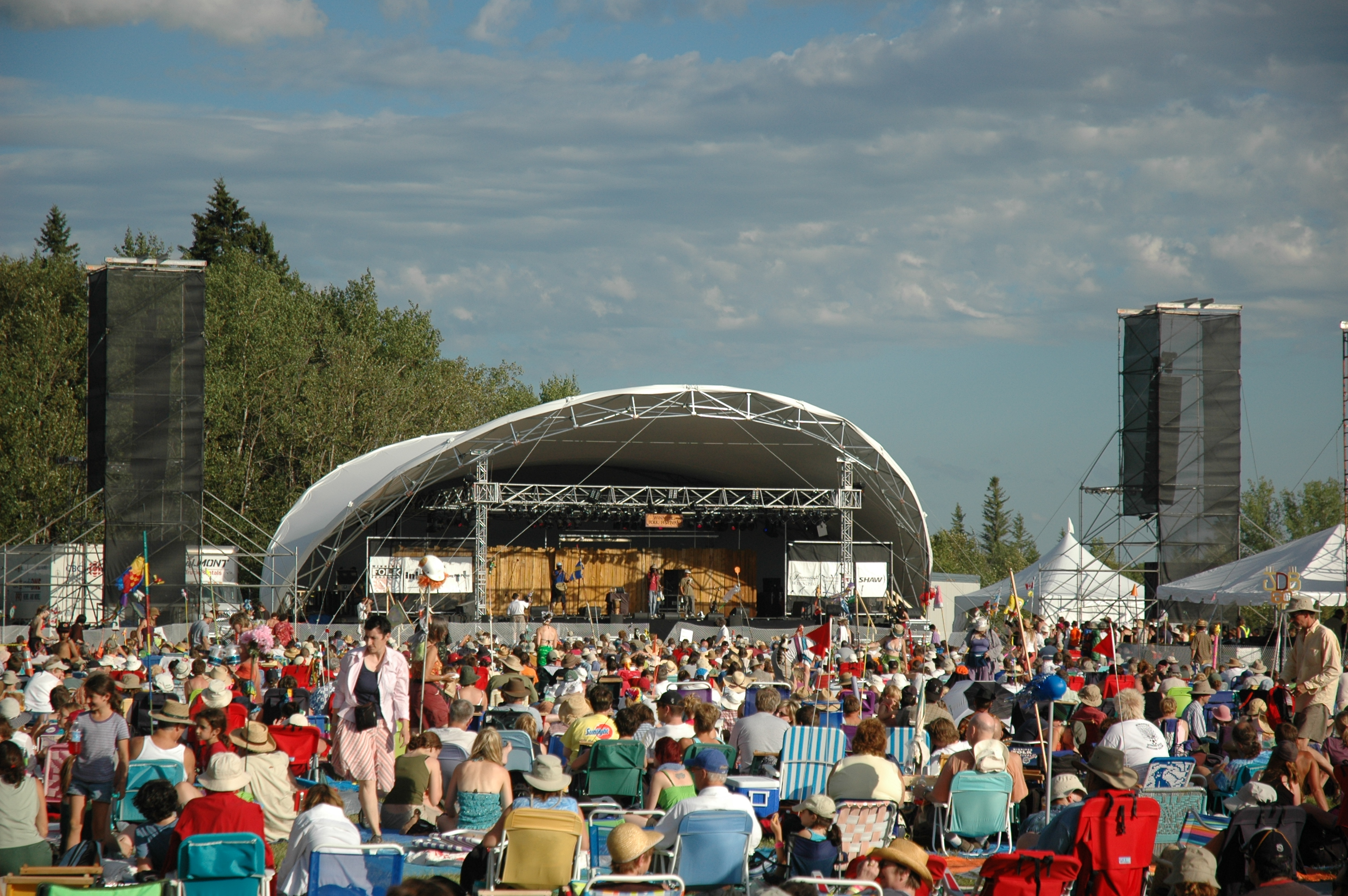
Winnipeg Folk Festival

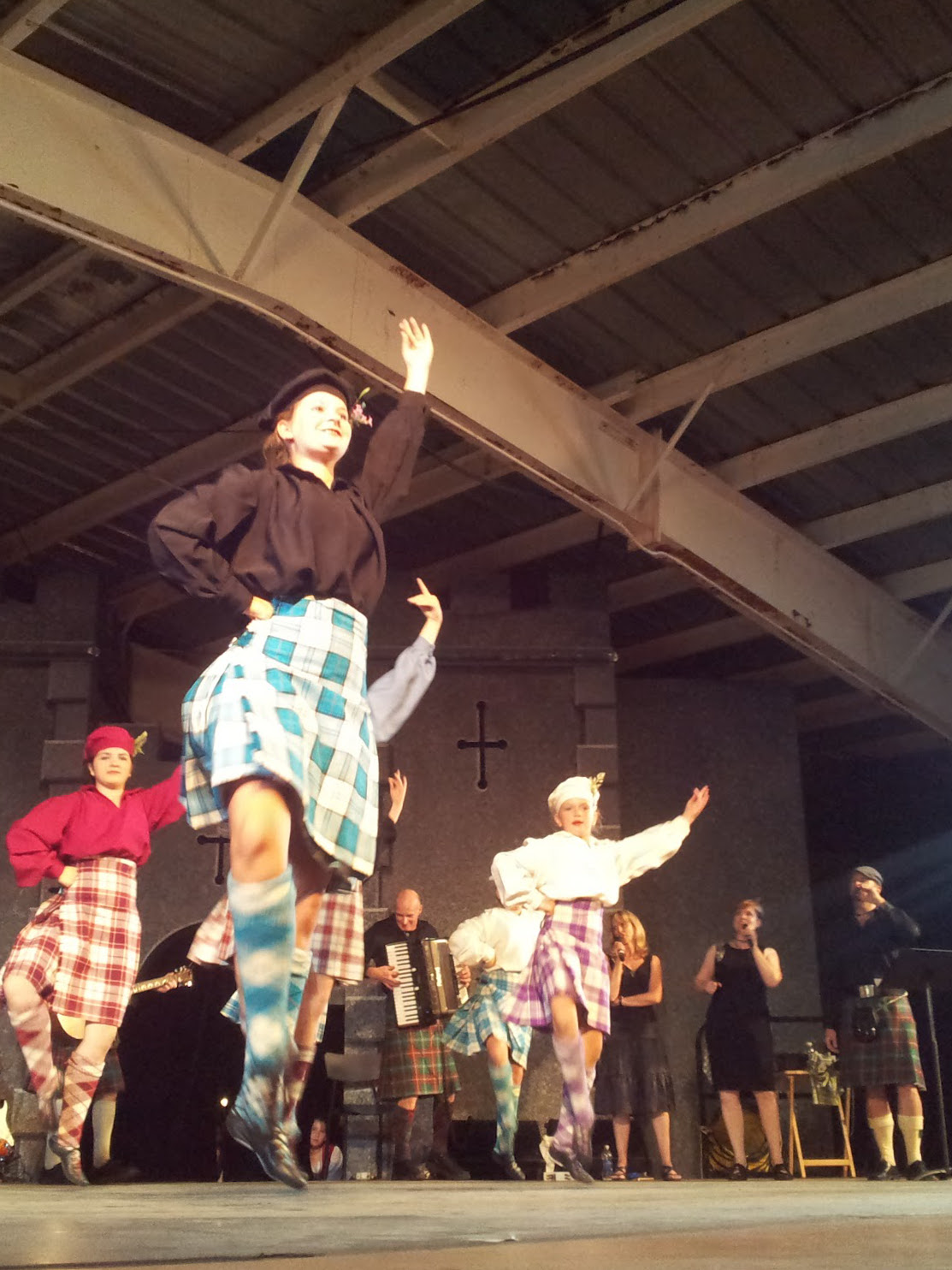
The Scottish Pavilion at Folklorama in 2012

=== Community and cultural festivals ===
- Envision: Wolseley's Arts Festival
- Festival du Voyageur
- Folklorama
- Winnipeg Friendship Festival

=== Film, theatre and comedy festivals ===
- NSI Film Exchange Canadian Film Festival
- Winnipeg Comedy Festival
- Winnipeg Fringe Theatre Festival
- Winnipeg International Children's Festival

=== Literary events ===
- Brave New Words: The Manitoba Writing and Publishing Awards
- Winnipeg International Writers Festival (THIN AIR)

=== Music festivals ===
- Jazz Winnipeg Festival
- Rosamunde Festival
- Winnipeg Folk Festival
- Winnipeg Symphony Orchestra Indigenous Festival
- Winnipeg Symphony Orchestra New Music Festival
