= Mercredi =

Mercredi is the French word for the day Wednesday and is named after the Roman deity Mercury.

Mercredi can also refer to:

- Duncan Mercredi - a Canadian poet
- Ovide Mercredi – a Canadian politician.
- Mercredi – a character in the anime series Kiddy Grade.
