= Fat Boy (hamburger) =

Burger with chili originating in Winnipeg

- Alternative names: Fatboy, Greek burger
- Course: Entree
- Place of origin: Canada
- Region or state: Winnipeg, Manitoba
- Created by: Multiple claims
- Serving temperature: Hot
- Main ingredients: Hamburger, chili sauce
- Variations: Multiple

A Fat Boy or Fatboy is a hamburger with a distinct chili meat sauce originating in the Greek burger establishments of Winnipeg, Manitoba. A number of Greek burger restaurants in Winnipeg claim to be the inventor of the burger, while other bars and restaurants have created their own interpretations of the style. The Fat Boy commonly consists of one or more patties, topped with a unique recipe of chili meat sauce, quartered dill pickles, tomatoes, lettuce and a large amount of mayonnaise and mustard.

Thought to have originated at Juniors, the Fat Boy originated in Winnipeg in the 1950s and is associated with the city's Greek-owned burger restaurants and drive-ins such as Juniors, Georges, Dairi-wip, Mrs. Mike's, VJ's, Daly Burger, Dairy Delight, the Red Top, Super Boys, A & V Drive Inn and many others. A common variation of the Fat Boy is the "chilli burger", which in Winnipeg means a burger with meat sauce dumped on top and eaten with a fork.

== See also ==
- Cincinnati chili - American spiced meat sauce also referred to as chili, originating from Greek immigrants
