= Atelier national du Manitoba =

Canadian artist collective

L'Atelier national du Manitoba was a three-year filmmaking and art project based in Winnipeg, Manitoba, Canada that ran from 2005 to 2008. The club's artistic output was devoted to the artistic study of the history, culture and ephemera of Winnipeg and Manitoba.

In collaboration, and individually under the l'Atelier rubric, the project's members created an array of short and feature-length films, videos, posters, curatorial showcases and essays.

== Background ==
University of Winnipeg scholar Andrew Burke describes the group, thus: "Unlike John Paizs’s fascination with the 1950s, or Guy Maddin’s attachment to the 1920s, L’Atelier was drawn to the detritus of the more recent past—the space stretching from the 1970s and 1990s mediated by video, local affiliates, and public access cable broadcasting."

According to the group's "Horizontalist Manifesto" published in January, 2005, they believed that Manitoba's true country was Québec, not Canada. Winnipeg filmmaker and writer Kevin Nikkel calls the document, "a mischievous yet sincere call for community."

In 2008, filmmaker and Nova Scotia College of Art and Design faculty member Solomon Nagler described L'Atelier as "Winnipeg's Nouvelle Vague," adding, "...pitting Winnipeg against itself, the collective creates nationalistic, sociopolitical, culture-jamming documents that explore the esoteric roots of Canada's other distinct society: Winnipeg, Manitoba."

== Garbage Hill Screenings and Kubasa in a Glass (2005) ==
On August 26–28, 2005, l'Atelier collaborated with Winnipeg artist Daniel Barrow to present the screening series, Garbage Hill: A Showcase of Discarded Winnipeg Film and TV, held at the Winnipeg Film Group's Cinematheque. According to film writer Jeff McKay, "This screening was so popular, unlike some of the broadcasts themselves, that potential viewers in the over-capacity crowd were unable to get tickets." The series was a compendium of former cable access television shows from VPW and Cablevision, locally produced television commercials and under appreciated films from thirty years of Manitoba filmmaking. Barrow presented clips from cable TV shows, such as dance free-for-all The Pollock and Pollock Gossip Show, repertory musical performance show The Cosmopolitans, and the white Persian cat fan club TV-newsletter What's New Pussycat, among others, with his signature overhead projector providing scrolling historical background on each show.

During the Garbage Hill screening series, L'Atelier national du Manitoba presented the history of locally-produced, low-budget TV commercials in the feature-length video Kubasa in a Glass: the Fetishised Winnipeg TV Commercial 1976-1992. The Oxford Handbook of Canadian Cinema describes Kubasa in a Glass as, "distinguished by the way in which the accumulation and juxtaposition of found materials is not a simple exercise in civic nostalgia, but rather a thorough investigation of how the structure of feeling of a just-passed historical moment might be visible in its remnants and remainders." A version of the feature-length video Kubasa in a Glass: the Fetishised Winnipeg TV Commercial 1976-1992 was screened at the 2006 Images Festival in Toronto, where the artists' statement in the festival program guide claimed, "the purest form of Winnipeg cinema is the disposable filmmaking of the city's televisual ephemera."

Barrow continued collecting the work of 1980s cable access stars, and in 2009 Video Pool Media Arts Centre released, Winnipeg Babysitter, a DVD compendium of cable access clips featuring early performances of Guy Maddin, Marcel Dzama, Neil Farber, The Cosmopolitans, the Pollocks, and many more.

In the summer of 2007, l'Atelier presented Beefs and Bouquets, a series of short programs of new films by friends and associated filmmakers such as Deco Dawson, Victoria Prince, Darryl Nepinak, Daniel Gerson and Eve Majzels, at the Winnipeg Cinematheque.

== Death by Popcorn: the Tragedy of the Winnipeg Jets (2005) ==
In December 2005, l'Atelier national du Manitoba presented a 60-minute video-collage Death by Popcorn: the Tragedy of the Winnipeg Jets at the Winnipeg Film Group's Cinematheque for three screenings. The video was edited in October and November, 2005. Subsequent to the video's Winnipeg premiere, l'Atelier became involved in a highly publicized public controversy and legal battle with media conglomerate CTV BellGlobeMedia over Fair Use of de-accessioned television footage. Throughout 2006 and 2007, Death By Popcorn screened across Canada and the United States.

Newspaper film critic Randall King described the video as a "comic work in which the Jets become the fulcrum of a meditation on Winnipeg self-loathing."

The Oxford Handbook of Canadian Cinema describes the video as, "a mostly found-footage film that examines the deep emotional investment the city had with its National Hockey League franchise and explores the collective civic trauma that came as a consequence of the Jets' departure from Winnipeg in 1996."

Writing in 2019, Cultural Studies scholar Andrew Burke states that, "Death by Popcorn in particular and the work of L'Atelier more generally use format historicity and medium specificity to demarcate, investigate, and, to a certain degree, celebrate the video era. In this way, it should be considered complementary to the work of SCTV. Just as SCTV's satire betrays a fascination with local affiliates and regional broadcasting, L'Atelier's fascination with local access cable programming marks an archival effort to understand the importance of this type of material in the history of Canadian television and in the civic imagination of the city itself."

Cinema scholar Sol Nagler writes of the video: "It is a media-collage tour de force, an overture that reveals its political purpose: uncovering the roots of Winnipeg’s distinct society by sifting through the ruins of its discarded visual history. Death by Popcorn is an allegorical study that reconsiders a tenuous time in Winnipeg’s history. The city had just lost its precious National Hockey League team, the Jets, and, consequently, was on the brink of a third mass uprising."

== "Stand Tall" Graffiti and Burton's Favourite (2006) ==
Enamored by local boosterism and propaganda campaigns, l'Atelier was also recognized for its wheatpaste posters and spray-paint stencils which often littered the downtown core area. In 2005, the Winnipeg Free Press reported that "the vandalism is inspiring head-scratching by city officials about the motives of the project." Bob McDonald, a spokesman for Winnipeg's public works department said in an official statement: "It's certainly not something we want posted around the city."

In February 2008, Atelier-commissioned art films I Dream of Driftwood (2006) and Burton's Favorite (2006) were featured in the Winnipeg Art Gallery exhibition, Subconscious City.

As the Oxford Handbook of Canadian Cinema recounts in detail, “In the years of L’Atelier, the group postered the city with images of Burton Cummings captioned with the title of his most successful solo hit, “Stand Tall.” The posters appeared without context of explanation throughout Winnipeg in 2005, and seemed an obscure injunction to the populace to take pride in the city. Yet, in contrast to official promotional campaigns that appealed to the sublimity of the Manitoba landscape or assertions of Winnipeg’s modernity to attract visitors, investment, or to simply make Winnipeggers feel good about themselves, the “Stand Tall” campaign embraced the somewhat embarrassing: an overwrought mid seventies soft rock hit and the beaming, goofy image of the man who wrote and sang it. […] The visual impact of the “Stand Tall” posters is captured in Burton’s Favourite (2006), a L’Atelier-produced short directed by Walter Forsberg and soundtracked by the song itself.”

== Other projects ==
In January 2008, the University of Manitoba's ARCH-2 Gallery installed Discount Everything, an exhibition featuring artwork and photographs by l'Atelier national du Manitoba and Winnipeg documentarian John Paskievich.

In 2008, l'Atelier publicly denounced the City of Winnipeg's downtown development office, Centre Venture, for their alleged plans to raze historically significant portions of the city's Chinatown district.

== Legacy ==
L'Atelier's core members – Matthew Rankin, Mike Maryniuk and Walter Forsberg – continue to work together periodically under their individual names.

Writing in 2007, Winnipeg Film Group Director Cecilia Araneda stated: "Back to the Atelier and its idolatry of kitsch and the young, subversively-charged filmmakers within the Film Group; while it is easy to criticize them for being opinionated and boastful, and for not walking softly, I actually applaud this in them. The Film Group was formed from the sheer strength of our collective individualism and it survives to this day only because of this, when external factors should have already rendered us extinct."

At a 2009 screening, Winnipeg Film Group Executive Director Cecilia Araneda publicly stated, "all of Winnipeg's marginalized film and video artists owe L'Atelier national du Manitoba an enormous debt of gratitude for their contribution to, and recognition of, what society has otherwise deemed as trash."

In 2014, Atelier member Walter Forsberg published a scrapbook history of the group, STARVATION YEARS: L'Album de l'Atelier national du Manitoba, 2005-2008.

L'Atelier members are featured in the 2017 documentary, Tales from the Winnipeg Film Group by filmmakers Dave Barber and Kevin Nikkel. In the introduction to his 2023 Establishing Shots: An Oral History of the Winnipeg Film Group, Nikkel writes, "L'Atelier's explosion of creativity [...] continues to resonate years later."
