= Dairi-Wip =

Restaurant in Winnipeg, Canada

- Dairi-Wip Neon sign
- Interactive map of Dairi-Wip

Restaurant information
- Established: 1958; 68 years ago
- Owner: The Lambos Family
- Food type: Fast food
- Location: 383 Marion St., Winnipeg, St. Boniface, Manitoba, R2H 0V4, Canada
- Coordinates: 49.8820°N 97.1095°W
- Seating capacity: Outdoor seating only
- Reservations: No
- Other locations: None

Dairi-Wip Drive Inn is a burger joint in Winnipeg, Manitoba, Canada, located in the city's French quarter. The drive-in is a former champion of the city's annual best burger competition and known for their in-house cut French fries. This institution is among the oldest places serving food in the city of Winnipeg.

== History ==
In summer of 1958, a local ice cream stand went up for sale next to the auto body shop where a 17-year old immigrant from Greece named Mike Lambos worked. Lambos, along with support from his older brothers Jim Lambos and John Lambos, secured a loan to buy the stand and converted it into a drive-in style restaurant serving burgers, fires, and frozen treats. Over the first decade of operation, their stand grew into a stable building with a parking lot and by 1968, the two storey neon Dairi-wip sign that has become a local food landmark. Dean and Triff Lambos were the next generation of the family to take over and they run the shop today.

Dean Lambos and Triff Lambos made changes of their own, such as adding poutine to the menu and making their staple sandwich, the Fat Boy, available via food delivery services. Carson Lambos is the son of Triff and has worked at the drive-in.

== Overview ==
On a typical Friday or Saturday, the Dairi-Wip goes through over 200 kg of potatoes, and at least an equal amount of ground round.

The signature item on the menu is the Fat Boy. This is a Greek style burger invented in Winnipeg first served at Junior's Restaurant and has become a local staple. When the burger first debuted at Junior's, Mike Lambos was an employee before he took over Dairi-Wip and he takes credit for giving the famous burger its name.
