= Carson Lambos =

Canadian ice hockey player (born 2003)

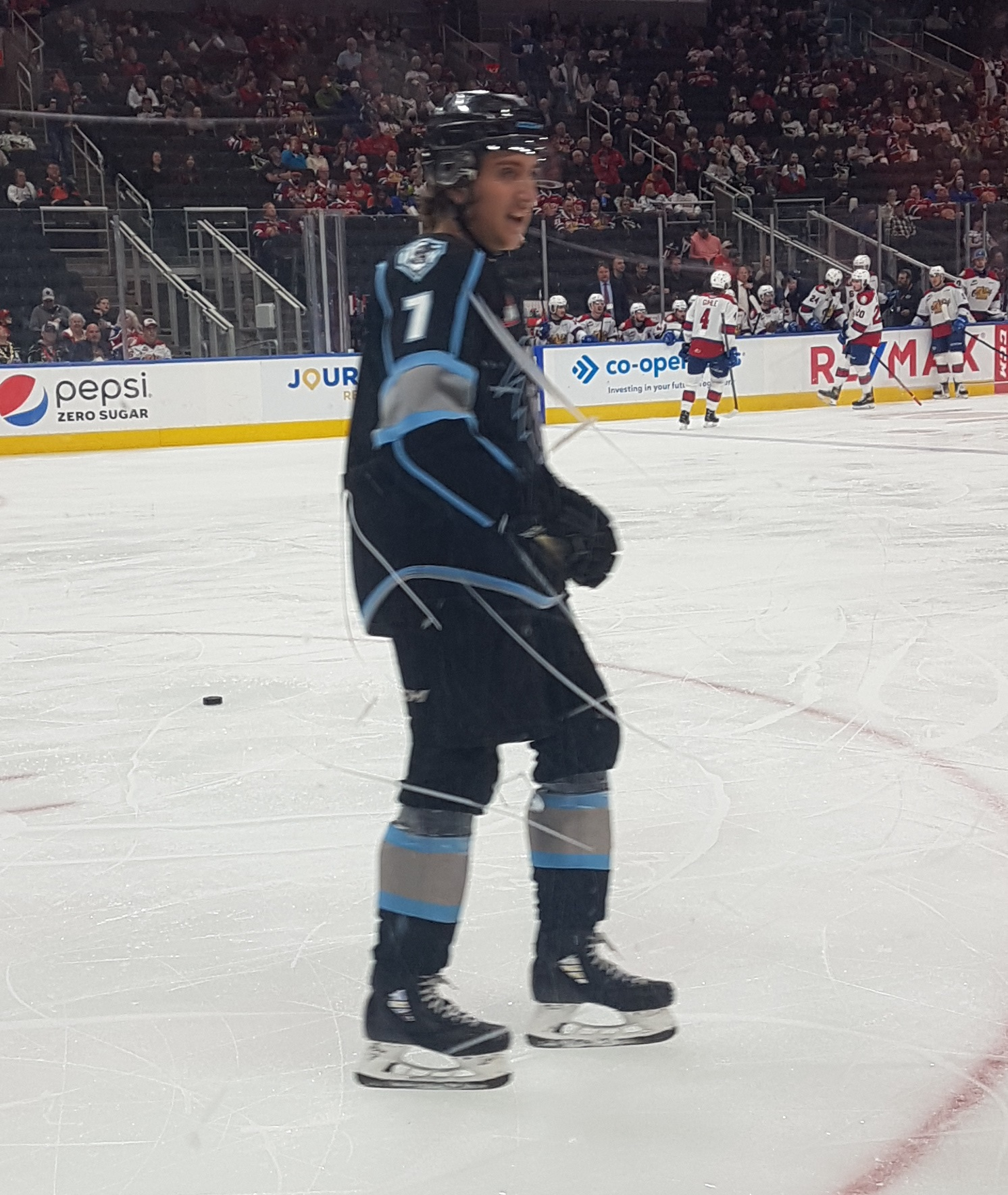
- Lambos with the Winnipeg Ice in 2022
- Born: January 14, 2003 (age 23) Winnipeg, Manitoba, Canada
- Height: 6 ft 1 in (185 cm)
- Weight: 197 lb (89 kg; 14 st 1 lb)
- Position: Defence
- Shoots: Left
- NHL team (P) Cur. team Former teams: Minnesota Wild; Iowa Wild (AHL); JYP Jyväskylä
- NHL draft: 26th overall, 2021; Minnesota Wild
- Playing career: 2021–present

Carson Lambos (born January 14, 2003) is a Canadian professional ice hockey defenceman who plays for Iowa Wild of the American Hockey League (AHL) as a prospect to the Minnesota Wild of the National Hockey League (NHL). Lambos was selected in the first round, 26th overall, by the Wild in the 2021 NHL entry draft.

== Playing career ==
On August 25, 2021, Lambos signed a three year entry-level contract with the Minnesota Wild.

On December 17, 2025, Lambos was called up to the Minnesota Wild and debuted the next day against the Columbus Blue Jackets. In a 5–2 win, he recorded a blocked shot in 10 minutes and 16 seconds of ice time. He was sent back down to the Iowa Wild the following day.

== Career statistics ==
=== Regular season and playoffs ===
			Regular season					Playoffs
Season	Team	League	GP	G	A	Pts	PIM	GP	G	A	Pts	PIM
2018–19	Kootenay Ice	WHL	5	1	0	1	2	—	—	—	—	—
2019–20	Winnipeg Ice	WHL	57	8	24	32	32	—	—	—	—	—
2020–21	JYP Jyväskylä	U20	13	2	9	11	8	—	—	—	—	—
2020–21	JYP Jyväskylä	Liiga	2	0	0	0	0	—	—	—	—	—
2020–21	Winnipeg Ice	WHL	2	0	0	0	0	—	—	—	—	—
2021–22	Winnipeg Ice	WHL	51	10	37	47	57	15	0	8	8	14
2022–23	Winnipeg Ice	WHL	61	12	36	48	63	19	1	6	7	4
2023–24	Iowa Wild	AHL	69	4	10	14	64	—	—	—	—	—
2024–25	Iowa Wild	AHL	68	5	14	19	43	—	—	—	—	—
2025–26	Iowa Wild	AHL	70	8	11	19	48	—	—	—	—	—
2025–26	Minnesota Wild	NHL	1	0	0	0	0	—	—	—	—	—
Liiga totals			2	0	0	0	0	—	—	—	—	—
NHL totals			1	0	0	0	0	—	—	—	—	—

Medal record

Representing Canada

Ice hockey

World Junior Championships
Gold medal – first place	2022 Canada	

=== International ===
Year	Team	Event	Result	GP	G	A	Pts	PIM
2019	Canada White	U17	4th	6	0	5	5	4
2022	Canada	WJC	1st place, gold medalist(s)	1	0	0	0	0
Junior totals				7	0	5	5	4

== Personal life ==
Lambos is the son of Triff Lambos, the owner of Dairi-Wip Drive-inn in Winnipeg

Awards and achievements
Preceded by Jesper Wallstedt	Minnesota Wild first-round draft pick 2021	Succeeded by Liam Öhgren
