= Prairie Theatre Exchange =

Theatre venue in Winnipeg, Canada

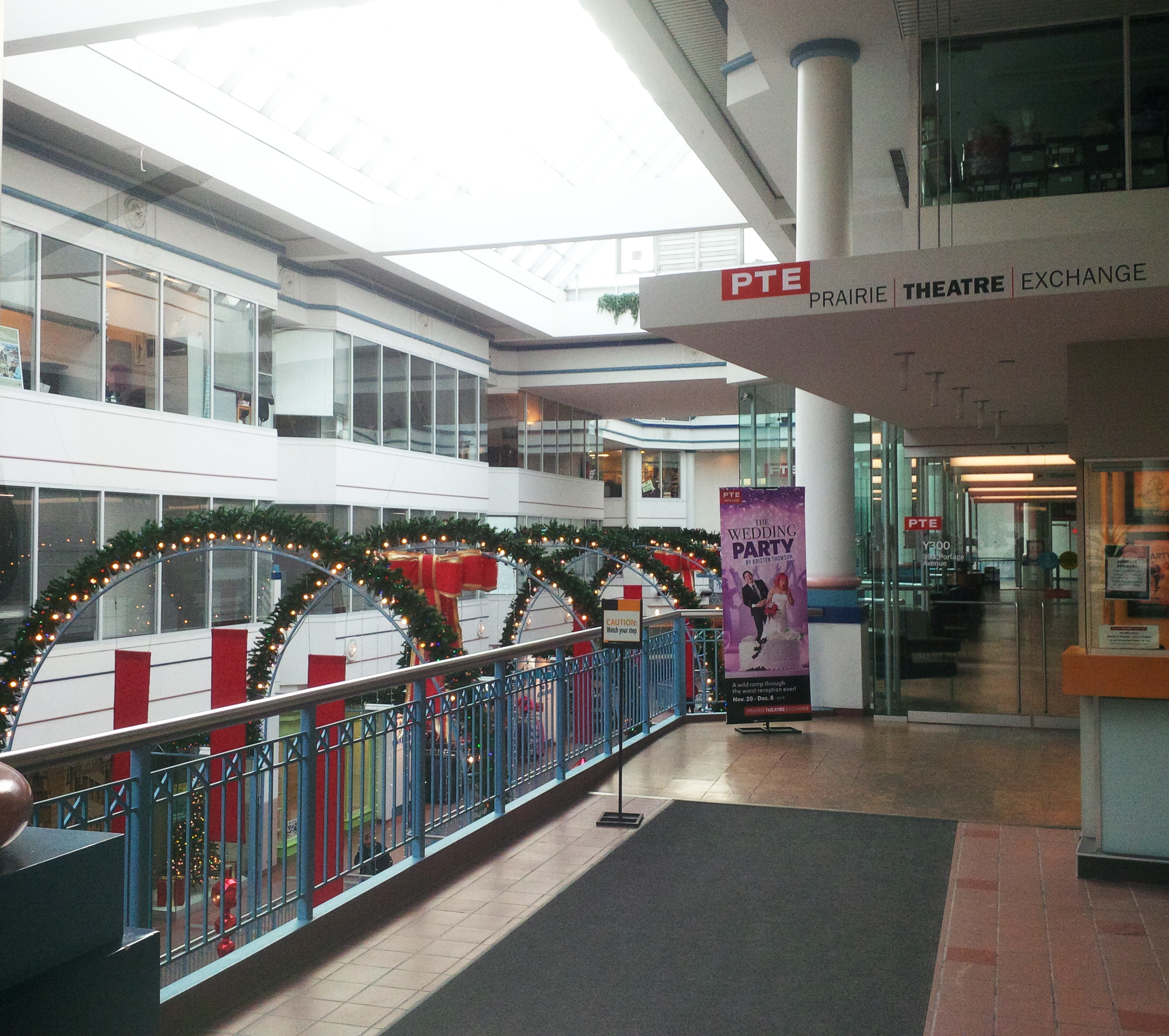
- Entrance to the PTE in Portage Place
- Interactive map of Prairie Theatre Exchange
- Address: 393 Portage Avenue; Winnipeg, Manitoba
- Coordinates: 49°53′N 97°9′W
- Elevation: 234 metres (768 ft)
- Capacity: 323
- Type: Theatre
- Public transit: Portage Place / Edmonton (RWB)

Construction
- Groundbreaking: 1985
- Built: 1987-89
- Opened: October 12, 1989; 36 years ago

Website
- www.pte.mb.ca

Prairie Theatre Exchange (PTE) is a professional theatre in Winnipeg, Manitoba, Canada. It is located on the third floor of Portage Place mall in downtown Winnipeg. By the end of the 2016–17 season, PTE had presented 340 plays on its thrust stage over its 44-year history, 149 of which were world premieres, to an annual average attendance of 35,000 people.

Approximately 700 students enroll annually in onsite acting classes, from adults to children as young as five. Classes range from acting for stage, film and TV to Improv to Theatre Production to Musical Theatre, Voice, Movement and others.

Every year, the Prairie Theatre Exchange's Theatre for Young Audiences touring program performs in elementary and junior high schools, as well as for community audiences throughout the province.

Educational partners of the PTE include the University of Manitoba, Winnipeg School Division, and other school divisions, alternative learning centres, and community arts groups across the province of Manitoba.

During the Winnipeg Fringe Theatre Festival, two of the festival's venues are the Prairie Theatre Exchange's Mainstage and Colin Jackson Studio, and both Folklorama and the Winnipeg Jazz Festival have been regular users of the facilities. PTE also rents office space to Shakespeare in the Ruins, Manitoba Chamber Orchestra, and Patient Puppets, pairing a very low rent with access to office equipment and staff expertise to support those endeavours.

== History ==
The theatre originated with the Manitoba Theatre School started by the Manitoba Theatre Centre (MTC) in 1960.

In 1972–1973, MTC shut down the school, and a group spearheaded by Colin Jackson and Charles Huband founded the Manitoba Theatre Workshop (MTW) to take its place. The organization operated out of the old Grain Exchange building on 160 Princess Street in downtown Winnipeg. Colin Jackson was director of MTW from 1973 to 1976.

Originally the Manitoba Theatre Workshop was oriented toward a younger audience, but in 1975, the first adult productions were performed at MTW. These were presented by Confidential Exchange, a studio theatre group of local actors formed in 1974.

In 1981, the workshop changed its name to the Prairie Theatre Exchange, to reflect a growing focus on presenting a season of plays for an adult audience, while maintaining its commitment to the School and its younger clientele. Gordon McCall became the artistic director that same year.

1982-1983 was an all-Canadian season of the PTE, featuring five world premieres, three of which were by Manitoba playwrights. This emphasis on local plays resulted in a $20,000 loss.

In 1983, Kim McCaw was appointed artistic director. During that year, subscription packages were introduced for its three-play adult season. 200 subscriptions were sold that season. These numbers increased to over 3500 by the 1985/86 season, and PTE established a reputation as a "prairie populist" theatre, becoming one of a handful of Canadian theatres at the time to give voice to Canadian stories.

The 1986–87 season was a milestone for the PTE. The theatre announced a balanced budget of $1.2 million, the first time that it had surpassed $1 million.

From 1987 through 1989, the Prairie Theatre Exchange initiated and completed a move into Portage Place Shopping Centre, with the opening play, Village of Idiots, at the new location on October 12, 1989. The new facility cost $3.5 million, comprised 42,500 square feet (3,950 m^{2}), and the new theatre seated 364. Later, a reconfiguration to improve sightlines resulted in the current house capacity of 323 seats.

Michael Springate became artistic director in 1991, followed by Allen MacInnis in 1995.

In August 2001, the Prairie Theatre Exchange performed overseas for the first time at the Edinburgh Fringe Festival, with an all-aboriginal cast in a production of fareWel by Winnipeg playwright Ian Ross.

In October 2002, PTE announced the appointment of Robert Metcalfe as artistic director for 2003–04, as it celebrated its 30th season.

In May 2004, the theatre launched the Carol Shields Festival of New Works. The festival featured staged readings of 21 new plays by 19 Canadian playwrights, and continues to bring together not only theatre companies but also dance companies, filmmakers, visual artists, musicians, and singer-songwriters every year to celebrate the act of creating new work. May 2013 saw the 10th annual Festival.

In March 2007, the PTE Playwrights Unit was established with seven local playwrights to use PTE as a base and resource. The current roster of new and established playwrights consists of Joseph Aragon, Sharon Bajer, Rick Chafe, Ginny Collins, Tricia Cooper, James Durham, Debbie Patterson, Ellen Peterson, Marc Prescott, and Alix Sobler. As of November 2013, PTE has given professional productions to four new plays that were developed within the Playwrights' Unit (Sharon Bajer, Burnin' Love - March 2011, Rich Chafe, The Secret Mask - November 2011, Ellen Peterson, The Brink - October 2012, and Tricia Cooper, Social Studies - November 2013). Other new scripts developed by the members of the Playwrights Unite during the past few years have been produced across the country, including a number of Short Shots—ten minute plays specially commissioned by PTE for the Carol Shields Festival.

As of April 2007, the total number of plays presented since 1973 reached 278. 131 of these were original works.

On November 8, 2007, PTE marked its 35th year with a special fundraising dinner honouring the extraordinary contributions of The Honourable Mr. Charles R. Huband. Mr. Huband, a Life Member of the PTE Board of Directors, was one of the driving forces in the creation of PTE.

On January 13, 2011, PTE launched its two-phase Capital Campaign with a goal of $2.2 million. On November 8, 2012, PTE announced that it reached its Capital Campaign goal of $2.5 million. With the completion of Phase 1 of the capital project in the summer of 2011, PTE was able to renovate the lobby, construct a new lounge, and upgrade its washrooms. The main theatre also received new carpeting, reupholstered seats, and fresh paint. The second phase, over the summer of 2012, saw the completion of a new Board Room, updated offices, the completion of a new film studio in the "Annex" portion of the facility, complete with editing suite, and a new space for the Playwrights Unit that includes a library of Canadian plays, workstations, and meeting area.

At the conclusion of the 2011/12 season, PTE's total number of productions increased to 310 over its history. (139 of these were new plays.)

In September 2012, the official name of the education program at PTE was changed to PTE Theatre and Film School, to reflect an increasing roster of film and TV acting classes.

PTE opened its 40th anniversary season with The Brink, by Ellen Peterson of the PTE Playwrights Unit. This October 2012 production was the 140th play in the company's history.

On October 29, 2012, Robert Metcalfe was presented with the Queen Elizabeth II Diamond Jubilee Medal by the Honourable Joyce Bateman, M.P. for Winnipeg South Centre in recognition of "his outreach to the community with made-in-Manitoba plays and his valuable contributions to Winnipeg's theatre and performing arts community, particularly as Artistic Director of PTE."

In the 2013–14 season, PTE produced the world premiere Social Studies by Trish Cooper, a member of the PTE Playwrights Unit. Prairie Theatre Exchange and Robert Metcalfe were honoured with two awards as a result of the support given to female playwrights: The 50/50 Award from the International Centre for Women Playwrights for programming plays by women playwrights for more than 50% of the 2012–2013 season (only two other Canadian theatres received the award that year), and the Bra d'Or Award for 2013 from the Playwrights Guild of Canada's Women's Caucus, awarded each year to an individual within the theatre community who has actively supported and promoted the work of Canadian women playwrights during their career.

In 2018, Thomas Morgan Jones became artistic director.

In 2021, Lisa Li, former producer at Soulpepper, became managing director. In 2024, Li and Jones both resigned from PTE after terminating most of the theater's production crew including department heads of wardrobe, carpentry, and props, citing financial struggles. In June of 2024, PTE announced that Katie Inverarity would be taking over as managing director. Inverarity had previously worked for the Royal Manitoba Theatre Centre in Marketing and Communications. In the fall of 2024, PTE announced local director Ann Hodges as the new artistic director.

== See also ==
- Winnipeg arts and culture
