= Sandra Birdsell =

Canadian novelist and short story writer of Métis and Mennonite

Sandra Birdsell CM
- Born: Sandra Louise Bartlette; 22 April 1942 (age 84); Hamiota, Manitoba, Canada
- Education: University of Winnipeg; University of Manitoba
- Occupations: Novelist; short story writer
- Children: 3
- Writing career
- Notable works: The Missing Child; The Russländer; Waiting for Joe
- Notable awards: Books in Canada First Novel Award (1990); Marian Engel Award (1993); Order of Canada (2010); Saskatchewan Order of Merit (2012)

Sandra Louise Birdsell, CM (née Bartlette; born 22 April 1942), is a Canadian novelist and short story writer of Métis and Mennonite heritage. She grew up in Morris, Manitoba, which inspired the fictional town of Agassiz in her first short story collection, Night Travellers (1982). She returned to Agassiz in her first novel, The Missing Child (1989), which won the Books in Canada First Novel Award in 1990.

Birdsell drew on her mother's Mennonite family history for her novel The Russländer (2001). Her novel Waiting for Joe (2010) was shortlisted for the Governor General's Award for English-language fiction. She received the Marian Engel Award in 1993, was appointed a Member of the Order of Canada in 2010, and was invested with the Saskatchewan Order of Merit in 2012.

== Biography ==
Born in Hamiota, Manitoba, Birdsell was the fifth of eleven children. She lived most of her early life in Morris, Manitoba, where the family moved after her father joined the army in 1943. Her father was a French-speaking Cree Métis born in Canada and her mother was a Low-German speaking Mennonite who was born in Russia.

When Birdsell was six and a half, her sister died from leukemia, which left a four-year gap between her and her next older sister. Her loneliness led her to ponder by herself to the nearby parks and rivers allowing her imagination to go wild.

Birdsell left home at the age of fifteen, where she studied at the University of Winnipeg and the University of Manitoba, where she studied under Robert Kroetsch. At the age of thirty-five, she enrolled in Creative Writing at the University of Winnipeg. Five years later, Turnstone Press published her first book, Night Travellers.

Her hometown of Morris experienced a major flood in 1950. Her first three stories in Night Travellers are based on that flood.

In 1996, she moved to Regina, Saskatchewan, and currently resides in Ottawa, Ontario. She is a mother to three children and a grandmother to four children.

In January 2007, Birdsell began a four-month term as the Carol Shields writer in residence at the University of Winnipeg.

== Publications ==
=== Short stories ===
==== Night Travellers ====
Birdsell's first book, a collections of interconnected short stories, Night Travellers (1982), is set in the imaginary Manitoba town of Agassiz, and concerns the large Lafreniere family: the teenaged sisters Betty, Lureen and Truda, their Mennonite mother Mika and their Métis father Maurice and the girls’ maternal grandparents, Oma and Opa Thiessen. Agassiz is based on the flood-prone town of Morris, on the banks of the Red River. where Birdsell spent her childhood. The source for the name Agassiz is Lake Agassiz, an enormous glacial lake that around 13,000 years ago covered much of what are now Manitoba, northwestern Ontario, northern Minnesota, eastern North Dakota, and Saskatchewan. Lake Agassiz is a controlling metaphor for the stories ... representing memory and ancestry". While the devastating flood that happened in Morris in 1950 "is a related image that reverberates throughout the text".

1984 Night Travellers received the Gerald Lampert Award from League of Canadian Poets. Usually this its awarded for a first book of poetry.

==== Ladies of the House ====
Birdsell's second collection, from 1984, is a sequel collection to Night Travellers that the focuses on the Laftenierre family women from Agassiz and their women friends, though most of the stories ae set in Winnipeg. In 1987 it was republished with Night Travellers, in one volume called Agassiz Stories. An American edition, titled Agassiz: A Novel in Stories, appeared in 1991 (Minneapolis: Milkweed).

=== Children's literature ===
The Town That Floated Away (1997) was influenced by Birdsell's experience as a child of the 1950 flood in Morris, and narrates the adventures of young Virginia Potts after she is left behind when her town floats away. Birdsell also wrote A Prairie Boy’s Winter, a one act play for children, which was co-written and produced by Prairie Theatre Exchange, in 1986.

=== Novels ===
==== The Missing Child ====
Birdsell's first novel, published in 1989, is "an evocative magic realist portrait of the fictional town of Agassiz", which won the W.H. Smith/Books in Canada First Novel Award.

==== Chrome Suite ====
Birdsell's second novel was published in 1992, and covers four decades of script-writer Amy Barber's life: from an extraordinarily hot summer in a small Manitoba town in 1950; "to the 1960s and the 1970s, when Amy marries, goes to live in the city, and begins to have reason to fear for her young son"; to the present, with Amy traveling from Toronto to Winnipeg with her young Polish, film-maker lover.

==== The Russländer ====
Published in 2001, this is Birdsell's third novel, and it explores Birdsell's own family history. The word Russländer means "Russians" in German and her mother and maternal grandparents were Mennonite emigrants from Russia. It was published as Katya in the US.

It is the story of Katherine (Katya) Vogt, and her Mennonite family's life in Russia from the end of 1910, until she, her husband, two sisters, and grandparents emigrated to Canada in 1923. Katya was born in 1902.

The story begins with the family living on the prosperous Mennonite estate of Abram Suddermann in Ukraine, where Katya's father is the overseer. They are under the protection of the Tsar whose wife is German. This is part of the Chortitza Colony, land granted to German-speaking Mennonites for colonization. Chortitza was founded in 1789 by Plautdietsch-speaking Mennonite settlers from West Prussia, and consisted of many villages. It was the first of many Mennonite settlements in the Russian Empire.

Life then becomes much harder when World War I begins and there is suspicion as to the loyalty of the Mennonites because they speak German. Life then eases when where the area is occupied by Austrian and German soldiers. However, Russia falls into chaos when they leave in 1917, with the February and October Revolutions. The Russian workers on the estate take the bloody revenge on the Mennonites. Katya's parents and her siblings, but for two sisters are brutally murdered. After years of poverty and near-starvation. Katya, her husband, sisters, and grandparents eventually emigrate to Canada in 1923, to settle in Manitoba: "Between 1923 and 1930, nearly 25,000 Mennonites fled violence that erupted in the Soviet Union".

== Recognition ==
=== Awards and honours ===
- 1984 Gerald Lampert Award — Night Travellers
- 1990 Books in Canada First Novel Award — The Missing Child
- 1992 Joseph S. Stauffer Prize — achievements in the arts
- 1993 Marian Engel Award
- 2001 Saskatchewan Book of the Year, Best Saskatchewan Fiction and City of Regina awards — The Russländer
- 2007 Saskatchewan Best Fiction Award — Children of the Day
- 2010 Appointed a Member of the Order of Canada
- 2012 Invested with the Saskatchewan Order of Merit
- National Magazine Award for short fiction

=== Shortlisted ===
- 1992 Shortlisted, Governor General's Award for English-language fiction — The Chrome Suite
- 1997 Shortlisted, Governor General's Award for English-language fiction — The Two-Headed Calf
- 1997 Shortlisted, Silver Birch Award — The Town That Floated Away
- 1997 Shortlisted, Saskatchewan Children's Literature Award — The Town That Floated Away
- 2001 Shortlisted, Giller Prize — The Russländer
- 2010 Shortlisted, Governor General's Award for English-language fiction — Waiting for Joe
- 2010 Shortlisted, Saskatchewan Book Awards Fiction Award — Waiting for Joe

=== Longlisted ===
- 2007 Longlisted, International Dublin Literary Award — Children of the Day

=== Nominations ===
- Juno Award — The Town That Floated Away (radio play)
- National Magazine Award for short fiction

=== Other recognition ===
- Selected for the Canadian Book Information Center's 45 Below recognition of ten promising writers under 45
- Received writing grants from the Manitoba Arts Council, Canada Council and Saskatchewan Arts Board

== Bibliography ==
=== Novels ===
- 1989: The Missing Child, Lester & Orpen Dennys
- 1992: The Chrome Suite, McClelland & Stewart
- 2001: The Russländer, McClelland & Stewart; published in the United States as Katya in 2004
- 2005: Children of the Day, Random House
- 2010: Waiting for Joe, Random House

=== Children's books ===
- 1997: The Town That Floated Away, illustrated by Helen Flook, HarperCollins

=== Short-story collections ===
- 1982: Night Travellers, Turnstone Press
- 1984: Ladies of the House, Turnstone Press
- 1987: Agassiz Stories, combining Night Travellers and Ladies of the House
  - 1990: French translation, Agassiz, translated by Maryse Trudeau, Du Roseau
  - 1991: United States edition, Agassiz: A Novel in Stories, Milkweed
- 1997: The Two-Headed Calf, McClelland & Stewart

=== Radio dramas ===
- June 1992: Another View of North, 60-minute drama commissioned by CBC
- September 1992: The Town That Floated Away, 30-minute drama produced by Barbara Nicol for CBC; released on CD and cassette by BMG Records
- March 1993: The Waiting Time, 60-minute drama commissioned by CBC

=== Film and television scripts ===
Birdsell has written for television, theatre and radio.

- Falling in Love, 30-minute script for the trilogy In Good Season, West End Productions
- Niagara Falls, 45-minute script for the trilogy In Good Season; produced in a 30-minute format for the CBC series The Way We Are, West End Productions
- Places Not Our Own, 60-minute drama for the miniseries Daughters of the Country, National Film Board of Canada
- Summer Storm, 30-minute script for the CBC series Family Pictures, Novina Motion Pictures

=== Plays ===
- 1986: A Prairie Boy's Winter, one-act play for children, co-written and produced by Prairie Theatre Exchange
- 1987: The Revival, two-act play commissioned and produced by Prairie Theatre Exchange

== Archives ==
There is Sandra Birdsell archives at Library and Archives Canada.
