= Örjan Sandred =

Swedish composer

Örjan Sandred (born June 15, 1964) is a Swedish composer and is a Professor in Composition at the Desautels Faculty of Music at the University of Manitoba in Canada.

== Biography ==
Sandred studied composition at the Royal College of Music in Stockholm, McGill University (Montreal) and at IRCAM (Paris). Among his teachers are Sven-David Sandström, Pär Lindgren, Magnus Lindberg, Daniel Börtz, Bill Brunson and Bruce Mather.

Sandred was teaching composition at the Royal College of Music in Stockholm for 1998–2005 and he has been a guest lecturer at IRCAM, Conservatoire National Superieur de Musique in Paris, at the Bartok Seminar in Szombathely in Hungary, at the Sibelius Academy in Helsinki, at McGill University in Montreal, at Harvard University, at the Shanghai Conservatory of Music and other places.

In 2022 Sandred was awarded a Guggenheim Fellowship from the John Simon Guggemheim Memorial Foundation. He is a Fellow of the Royal Society of Canada since 2023

== Composition ==
Many of Sandred's compositions are the result of his search for new methods of composition. These methods use computerized rule-based systems (a sub-branch of artificial intelligence) to formalize the musical structure.

In 2009 the CD Cracks and Corrosion, featuring five of Sandred's compositions, was released on the Navona Records label.
