= Folklorama =

Annual cultural festival in Canada

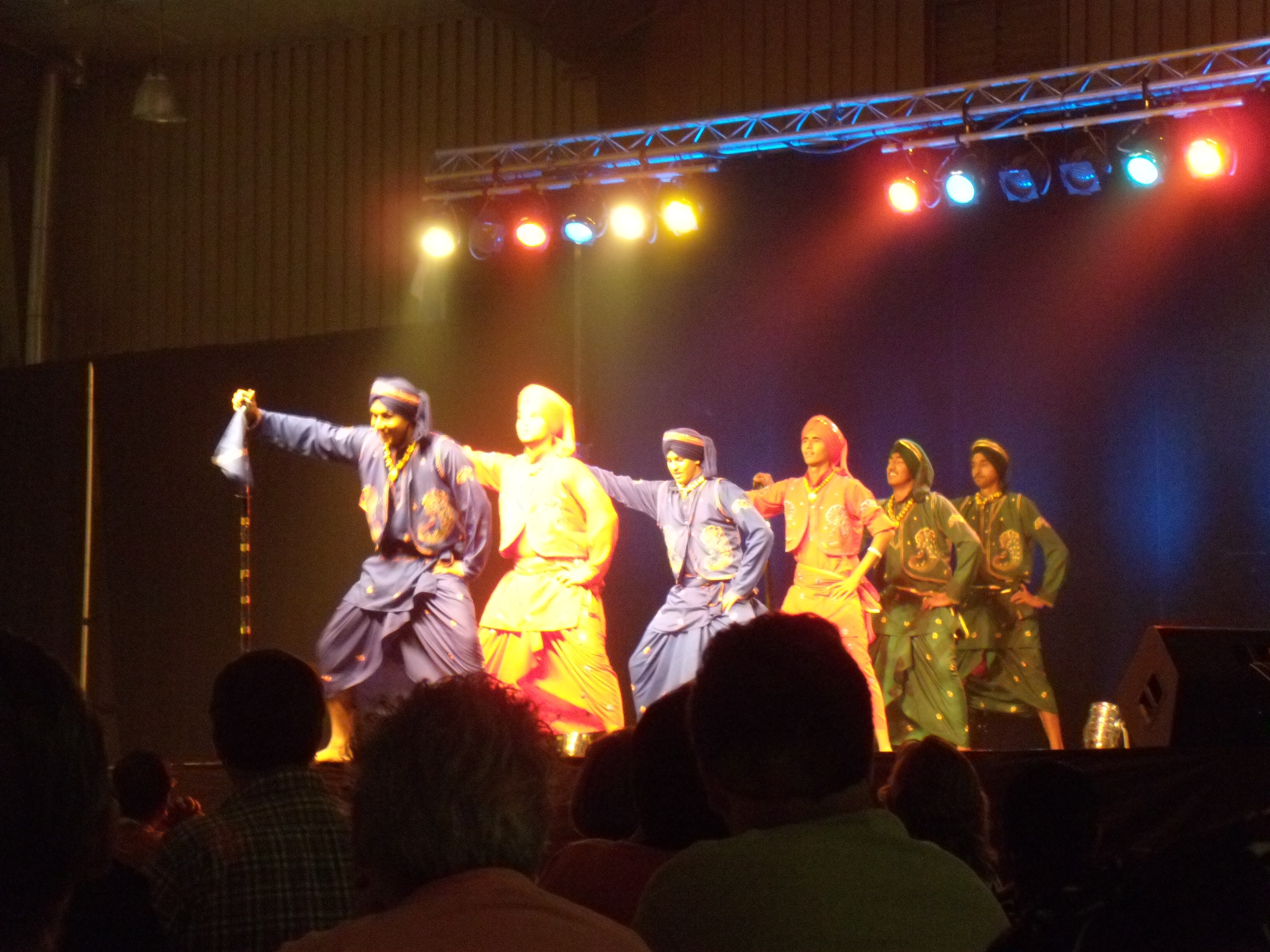
- Folklorama 2012 India Pavilion
- Frequency: Annually
- Locations: Winnipeg, Manitoba, Canada
- Years active: 56
- Inaugurated: 1970
- Previous event: August 2–15, 2026
- Next event: August 1–14, 2027
- Attendance: 362,397 (2026)
- Website: www.folklorama.ca

Folklorama is an event that runs for two weeks each August in Winnipeg, Manitoba, Canada. Visitors to the festival are invited to sample cuisine and celebrate the cultural and ethnic heritage of people from dozens of cultures who have made Winnipeg their home. Folklorama is the world's largest and longest-running multicultural festival.

Each culture has an assigned venue, known as a pavilion. Typically there are over 40 pavilions presented throughout the city, with half operating in week one and half in week two of the festival. Each pavilion presents a show featuring the song and dance of their culture, along with trademark ethnic cuisine and a cultural display. Some pavilions also incorporate additional services such as henna tattoo application, steel pan drum workshops, and some have late night parties. Most pavilions provide imported cultural beverage.

Folklorama provides exposure to cultural groups and brings in thousands of tourists each year, adding to the city's economy. It is the largest and longest-running festival of its kind in the world. The Folk Arts Council of Winnipeg is the organizing body of Folklorama.

== History ==
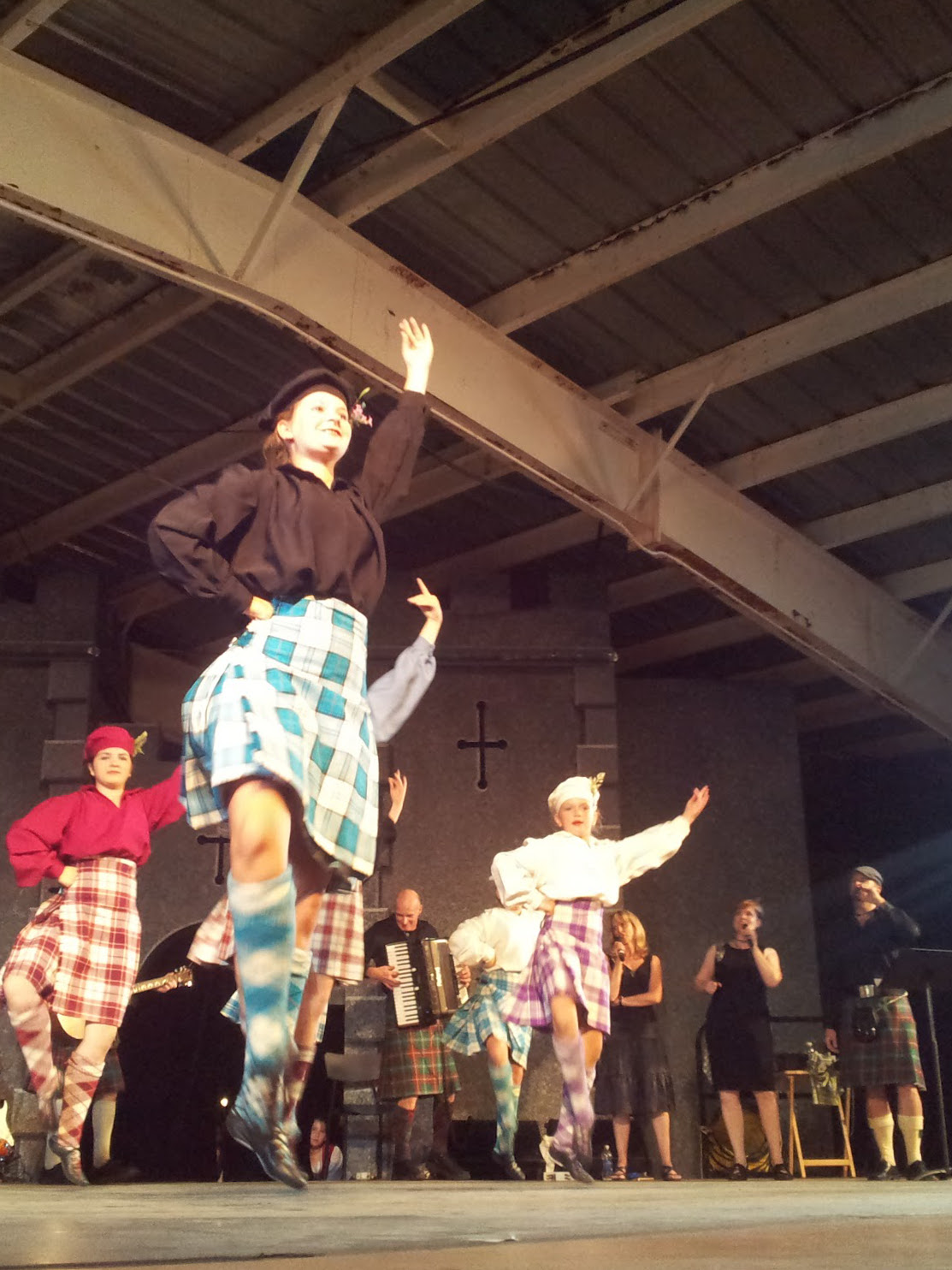
Performers at the 2012 Folklorama Pavilion of Scotland

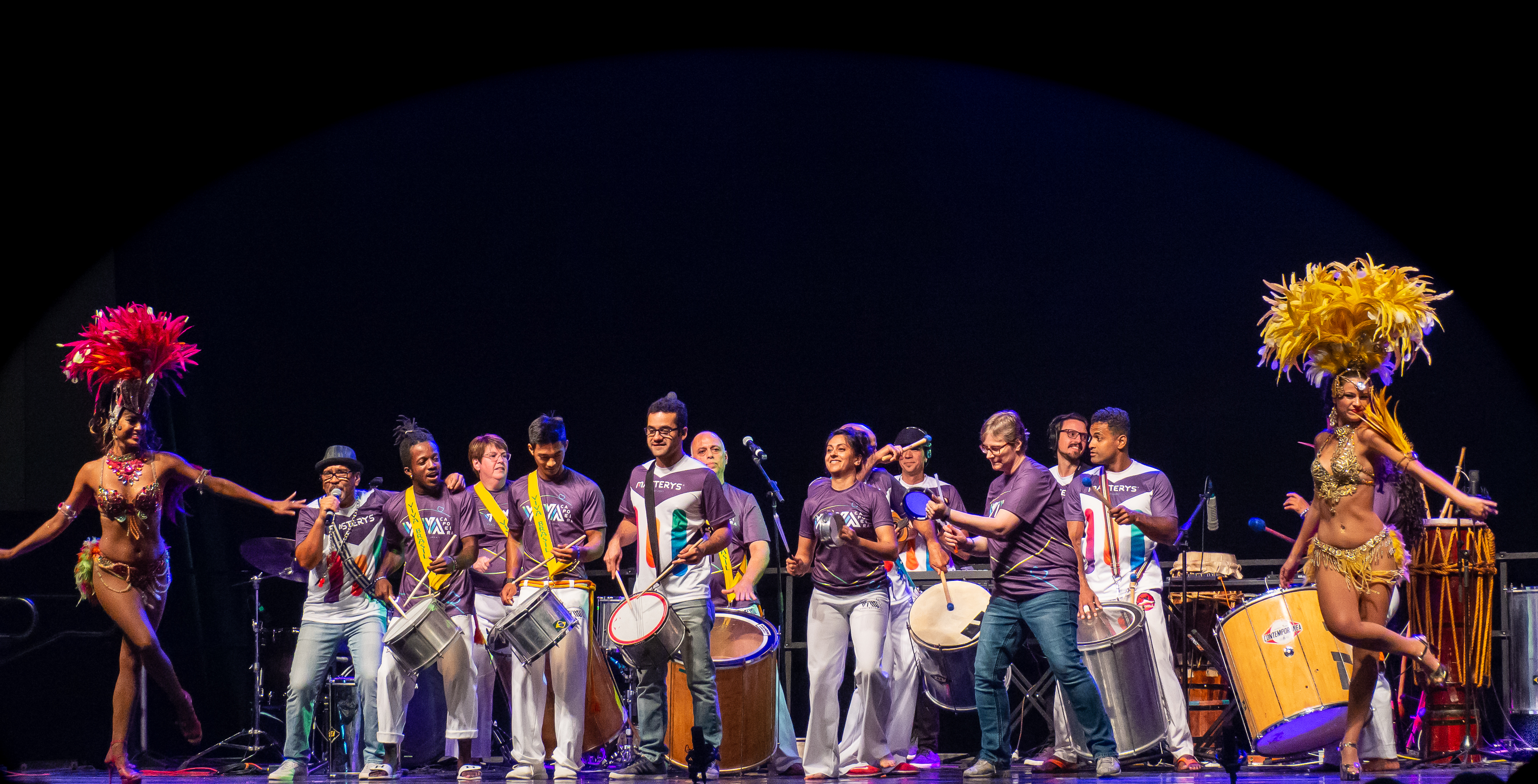
Brazilian Orchestra

Folklorama was first held in August 1970, as a Centennial Folk Festival sponsored jointly by the City of Winnipeg and the Folk Arts Council of Manitoba. It was originally intended to be a one-time occurrence in celebration of Manitoba's centennial. It was deemed such a success that it became an annual event. The first festival was only a week long, featuring 21 different cultures. The Africa/Caribbean, Greek, Indian, Polish, Portuguese, and Ukrainian pavilions were the festival's original six pavilions; it drew approximately 50,000 people across 75,000 separate pavilion visits. The festival adopted its current two-week format in 1988, with half of the pavilions open in each week.

The Folklorama logo was designed by Winnipeg graphic designer Andy Stout who won the provincial logo contest in 1980. The four figures in the logo represent people from the four corners of the globe. The four united figures are intertwined, with arms raised in celebration. The four colours of the figures represent the four colours of human beings: white, brown, yellow, and red. Since white cannot be printed, the colour blue (cyan) is used as a substitute. The festival's mascot, the Folklorama Llama, was created in 1986.

Until 1989, pavilions would have a mayor and a queen. The queen would be in the running for the Miss Folklorama pageant at the closing ceremony of the Festival. The Miss Folklorama pageant was not a beauty pageant but a "contest of ethnic preservation and presentation", as the pavilion queens were scored based on 40% knowledge of culture and country, 40% on participation and 20% on poise and personality. Since 1990, pavilions now feature two adult ambassadors and two youth ambassadors, neither of whom must be of a specific gender.

The 50th edition of the Folklorama festival was in 2019. There were 22 pavilions in the first week including: African, Argentina "Tango", Budapest-Hungaria, Caribbean, Celtic Ireland, Chile, Egyptian, El Salvador, Ethiopian, First Nations, German, Greek, India, Israel "Shalom Square", Korean, España-Spain, Portugal, Scandinavian, Serbian/Beograd, Slovenija, Ukraine "Spirt of the Ukraine", and the United Kingdom. There were 23 pavilions in the second week, including: Africa/Caribbean, Brazilian, Canadien-Français, Chilean, Chinese, Croatian "Zagreb", Hungary-Pannonia, Irish, Italian, Japanese, Métis, Mexican, Scotland, Philippines "Pearl of the Orient", Portuguese "Casa do Minho", Polish, Punjab, Romanian, Russian, Serbian "Kolo", South Sudanese, Tamil, and Ukraine-Kyiv.

Folklorama was cancelled in 2020 and 2021 due to the COVID-19 pandemic, but resumed in 2022 with 24 pavilions and a 14% increase in attendance over 2019. In 2023, the number of pavilions offered increased to 40. The 52nd edition in 2023 drew 301,460 total admissions across 40 pavilions, driven by increased paid entries and over 23,000 free youth admissions. The festival sustained this momentum into 2024 with 39 active pavilions hosting roughly 300,000 guests from Winnipeg and around the globe, introducing new cultural representations like the Ghana Pavilion and maintaining its economic model of funneling all marketplace and food sales directly back into local ethno-cultural community groups. By its milestone 55th edition in August 2026, Folklorama reached 362,397 total visits across 45 pavilions, powered by a massive collective effort of 40,264 volunteer shifts and 972 staged performances.

== Program areas ==
Throughout the year, Folklorama is sustained by its Ethno-Cultural Arts Division and programs: Folklorama at Home, Folklorama at School, Folklorama at Work, and Folklorama at Play.

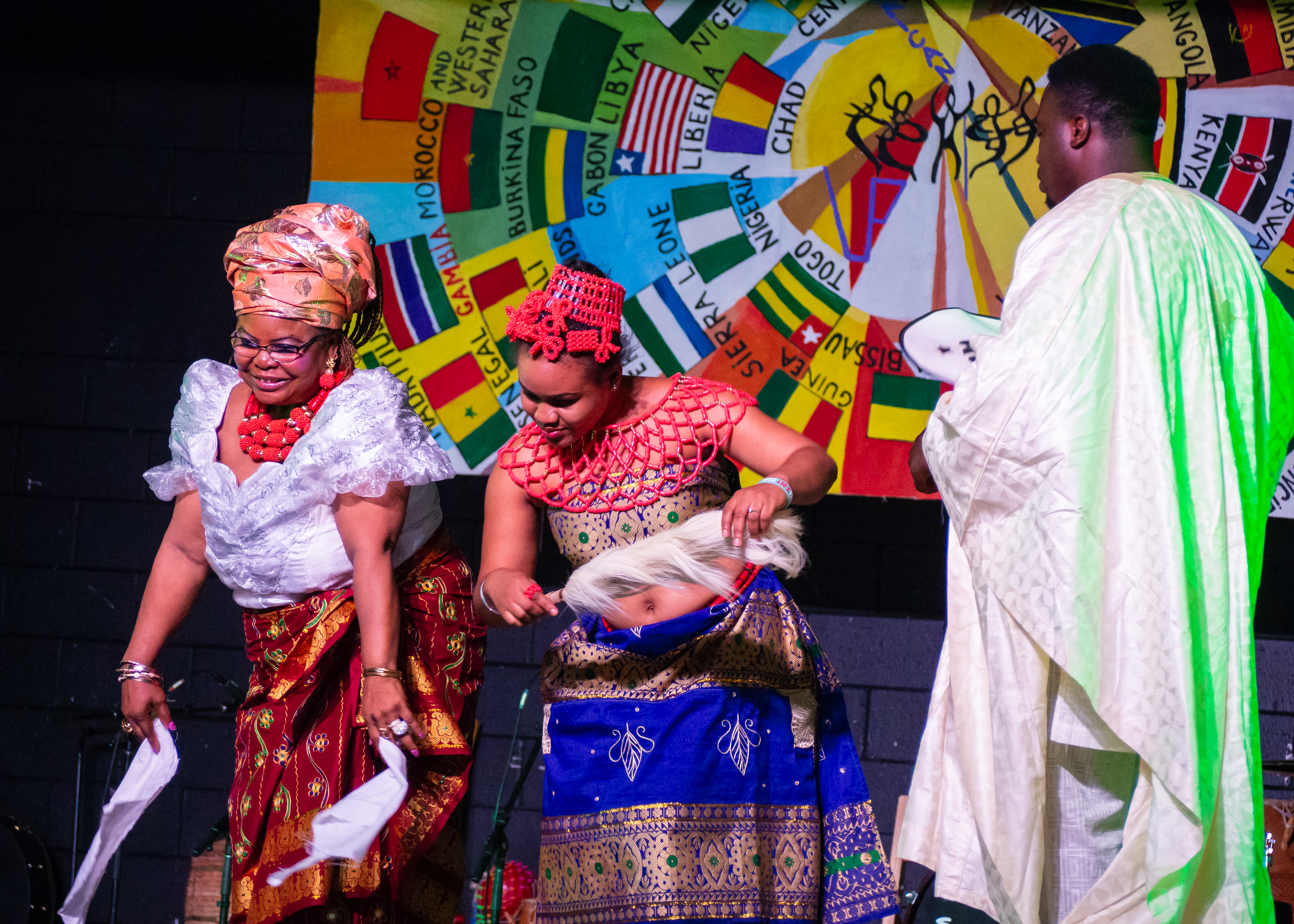
A Nigerian Traditional wedding dance at the 2018 Winnipeg Folklorama Festival

== Statistics ==
- On average, Folklorama receives approximately 400,000 pavilion visits each year. The 2022 Festival received 168,516 pavilion visits to 24 pavilions, while 2026 received 362,397 guests over 972 shows at 45 pavilions. The majority of those who attend the Festival visit more than one pavilion.
- About 21% of pavilion visitors come from outside of Winnipeg.
- Typically, more than 3,000 entertainers perform at more than 1,500 shows throughout the two-week Festival.
- On average, 600,000 meals are served and 1,000,000 beverages are poured before the conclusion of the Festival.
- Approximately 20,000 volunteers participate to make Folklorama possible. In 2026, there were over 40,000 volunteer shifts.
- Folklorama has an economic impact of about $14.7 million on the Manitoba economy.
