= Duncan Mercredi =

Cree writer based in Winnipeg, Manitoba

- Born: 1951 (age 74–75); Grand Rapids, Manitoba
- Occupation: poet
- Writing career
- Period: 1990s–present

Duncan Mercredi (born 1951) is a Cree and Métis poet from Winnipeg, Manitoba.

== Life and career ==
Mercredi was born in Misipawistik Grand Rapids, Manitoba, where he grew up. At sixteen he moved to Cranberry Portage, Manitoba, where he attended high school and moved to Winnipeg shortly thereafter.

Mercredi's mother was a residential school Survivor, which formed the inspiration for many of the poems in his most recent book, 215.

In 2020, Mercredi became the second (after Di Brandt) Poet Laureate of Winnipeg. In 2021, he won the Manitowapow Award at the Manitoba Book Awards.

== Bibliography ==
- Spirit of the Wolf: Raise Your Voice (Pemmican Publications, 1991)
- Dreams of the Wolf in the City (1992)
- Wolf and Shadows (1995)
- Duke of Windsor: Wolf Sings the Blues (1997)
- mahikan ka onot: The Poetry of Duncan Mercredi (2020)
- 215 (2022)
