= VJ's Drive Inn =

Restaurant in Winnipeg, Canada

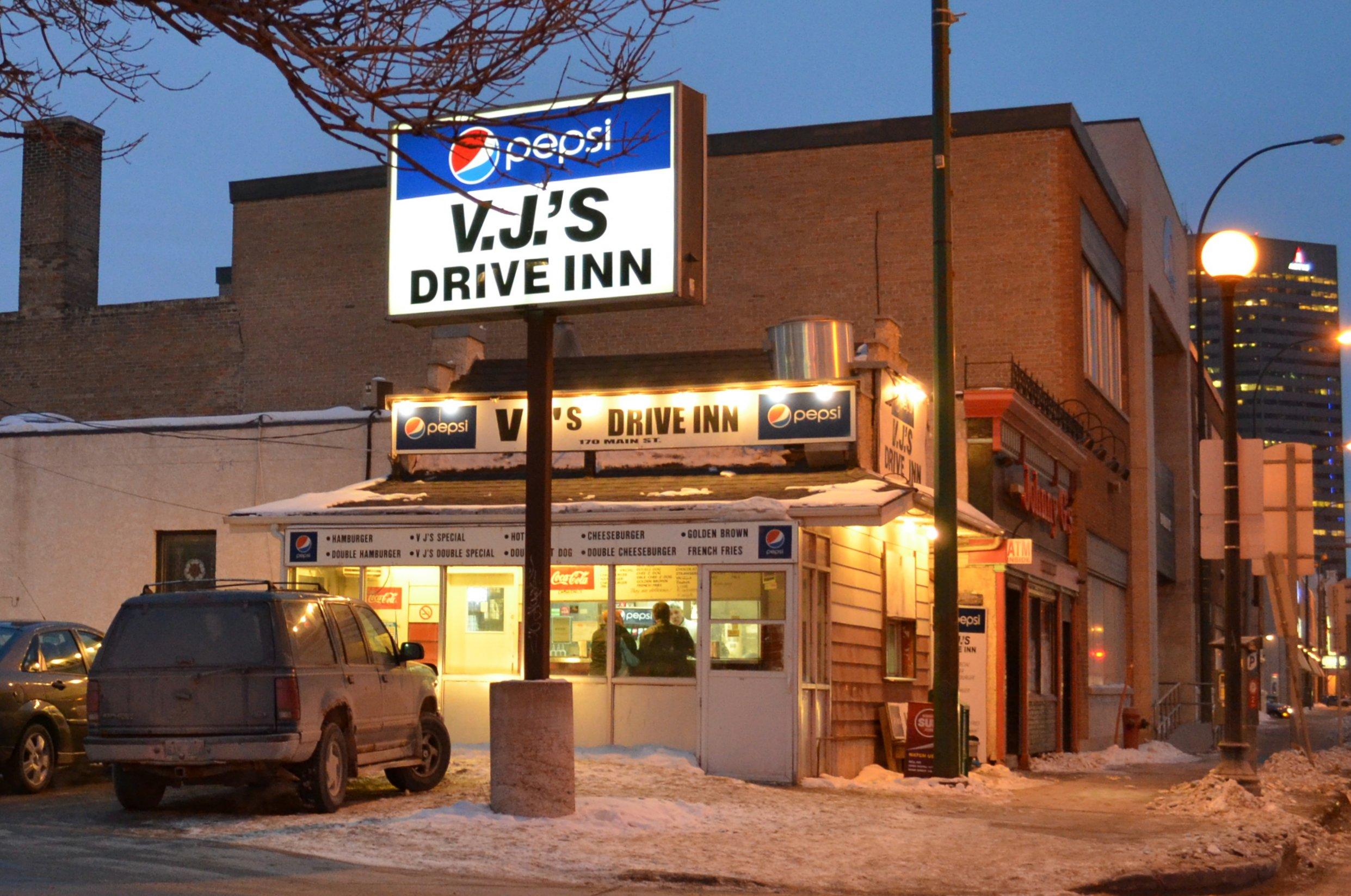
- Interactive map of VJ's Drive Inn

Restaurant information
- Established: 1980; 46 years ago
- Owner: John Calogeris
- Food type: Fast food
- Location: 170 Main St., Winnipeg, Winnipeg Metro Region, Manitoba, R3C 1A6, Canada
- Coordinates: 49.8896°N 97.1355°W
- Seating capacity: Outdoor seating only
- Reservations: No
- Other locations: One

VJ's Drive Inn is a burger joint in Winnipeg, Manitoba, Canada, located at 170 Main Street.

== Overview ==
The restaurant initially opened as Juniors in 1958, the name of the restaurant changed to VJ's Drive Inn in 1980.

The restaurant is owned by John Calogeris whose father was Nick Calogeris (b. Spiros Calogeris). Nick Calogeris was involved with many Winnipeg restaurants, such as The Manhattan, the Original Food Bar, BBQ Restaurant, and Kit Kat Grill. John Calogeris' two partners—John and Gus Razos—are his cousins.

Staff at VJ's prepare and sell up to 5,000 pounds (2,300 kg) of french fries per week, and up to 100 pounds (45 kg) of hamburger each day. Because the restaurant only has outdoor seating, all orders are take-out and are packaged into traditional fold-up boxes.

Actor Blake Anderson said the “VJ’s Drive Inn has probably one of the top five burgers I’ve ever had in my life,” when discussion the "Fat Boy Burger" when he was in town filming the curling movie Sticks and Stones. Timeout Magazine also labeled having a meal at VJ's as the third best thing to do in all of Winnipeg.

Prominent VJ’s customers throughout the years include former Winnipeg Mayor Sam Katz, Burton Cummings, George Reznik, Hymie Weinstein, former Premier and United States Ambassador Gary Doer, Steve Ashton, Al Golden, and Garth Steek.
