= Provincial Archives =

Provincial Archives can be:

- Archives of Manitoba, Winnipeg, Manitoba, Canada
- Archives of Ontario, Toronto, Ontario, Canada
- Bibliothèque et Archives nationales du Québec, multiple sites
- National and Provincial State Archives (Belgium)
- Nova Scotia Archives and Records Management, formerly the Public Archives of Nova Scotia, Halifax, Nova Scotia, Canada
- Provincial Archives of Newfoundland and Labrador, St. John's, Newfoundland and Labrador, Canada
- Provincial Archives of Alberta, Edmonton, Alberta, Canada
- Provincial Archives of Funen, in Odense, Denmark
- Provincial Archives of New Brunswick, New Brunswick, Canada
- Public Archives and Records Office (Prince Edward Island), Prince Edward Island, Canada
- Royal British Columbia Museum, which absorbed the former British Columbia Provincial Archives, Victoria, British Columbia, Canada
- Saskatchewan Archives Board, Saskatoon and Regina, Saskatchewan, Canada
- The Provincial Archives of Östergötland, Sweden, housed in Vadstena Castle

== See also ==
- The Provincial Archive, Canadian rock band
