= Provincial and territorial museums of Canada =

Provincial and territorial museums of Canada are museums maintained by the provinces and territories of Canada to preserve their local history and culture. However, the collections of some museums extend beyond its provincial boundaries, showcasing historical and natural works from around the world. These museums are the equivalent to national museums, operated by the provincial and territorial governments of Canada. In the mostly French-speaking province of Quebec, the provincial government uses the term "national" to refer to provincial museums.

Many provinces have separate facilities for human and natural history museums, art galleries, and archives. However, in the case of Newfoundland and Labrador, all these functions are housed in one complex, The Rooms, in St. John's.

== List of provincial and territorial history museums ==
Nearly all Canadian provinces and territories operate a provincial museum of some kind, the majority being either encyclopedic museums that cover a wider variety of topics including science and nature, or history museums, that focus on human events. The only province that does not operate a provincial museum is Prince Edward Island. The following table lists the provincial and territorial museums presently operating in Canada.

Name	Photo	City	Province	Year established	Visitors annually	Description
Manitoba Museum		Winnipeg	Manitoba	1965	303,191 (2017)	A museum of human and natural history.
Musée de la civilisation		Quebec City	Quebec	1984	543,128 (2005)	A museum of human history.
New Brunswick Museum		Saint John	New Brunswick	1842	32,584 (2017)	A museum of human and natural history, it is the oldest continuously operating museum in Canada.
Nova Scotia Museum		Multiple sites	Nova Scotia	1868 (Note: Although the Nova Scotia Museum was established in 1868, the decentralized museum includes institutions that were established earlier, such as the Halifax Mechanics' Institute in 1831.)	549,500 (2015) (Note: The following is the total attendance figure from all 28 Nova Scotia Museum locations.)	The museum is a decentralized museum system made up of 28 museums spread throughout the province.
Prince of Wales Northern Heritage Centre		Yellowknife	Northwest Territories	1979		A museum of human and natural history, it also houses the territorial government's archives.
Royal Alberta Museum		Edmonton	Alberta	1967		A museum of human and natural history.
Royal British Columbia Museum		Victoria	British Columbia	1886	770,000 (2017)	A museum of human and natural history, it also houses the provincial archives, after merging with British Columbia Archives in 2003.
Royal Ontario Museum		Toronto	Ontario	1912	1,440,000 (2017)	A museum of art, human and natural history, it is the largest, and most visited museum in Canada.
Royal Saskatchewan Museum		Regina	Saskatchewan	1906	139,122 (2017)	A museum of natural history.
The Rooms		St. John's	Newfoundland and Labrador	2005	87,083 (2017) (Note: Attendance for The Rooms is for the entire facility, and not for individual departments of The Rooms, which includes its archives, and museums.)	A museum of human and natural history, the museum shares a building with the provincial archives and art gallery.

== List of provincial and territorial art galleries ==
Several Canadian provinces and territories operate art galleries. The following table lists the provincial and territorial art galleries presently operating in Canada.

Although it receives public money, the Art Gallery of Alberta is not a provincially-operated institution, but is run by a not-for-profit society, and has been excluded from this table.

Name	Photo	City	Province	Year established	Visitors annually	Description
Art Gallery of Nova Scotia		Halifax	Nova Scotia	1908	45,455 (2017)	The largest art gallery in Atlantic Canada, its collection includes classical portraits, Nova Scotia folk art, and Inuit stone carvings.
Art Gallery of Ontario		Toronto	Ontario	1900	974,736 (2018)	The art gallery is the largest provincially-managed art gallery in the country. Its collection includes 98,000 works ranging from the first century to present day, as well as the largest collection of Canadian art.
Beaverbrook Art Gallery		Fredericton	New Brunswick	1959	10,333 (2016)	Designated as a provincial art gallery by Government of New Brunswick, the gallery was originally funded by Baron Beaverbrook.
McMichael Canadian Art Collection		Kleinburg	Ontario	1965		Originally the private collection of Robert and Signe McMichael, which was donated to the provincial government in 1965 and opened to the public in 1966. The collection primarily consists of works by the Group of Seven and artists associated with them, but has expanded to include other Canadian artists as well as Indigenous artists.
Musée national des beaux-arts du Québec		Quebec City	Quebec	1933	387,333 (2018)	Its collection includes approximately 40,000 works produced in Quebec, or by Quebec artists since the 18th century.
Remai Modern		Saskatoon	Saskatchewan	2009		A museum of modern art, although its collections also includes works created before that period. The museum is formally incorporated as the Art Gallery of Saskatchewan, although it is branded as Remai Modern.
The Rooms		St. John's	Newfoundland and Labrador	2005	87,083 (2017)	The provincial art gallery shares a building with the province's provincial archives, and museum.
Yukon Arts Centre		Whitehorse	Yukon	1992		In addition to a permanent collection of Indigenous and northern art the facility serves as an arts centre.

== List of provincial and territorial archives and libraries ==
Nearly all Canadian provinces operate a provincial archive and libraries. The British Columbia Archives was a former provincial agency that managed the archives for the province of British Columbia. In 2003, the provincial government merged the British Columbia Archives with the Royal British Columbia Museum, while the record management component of the former agency was assumed by the British Columbia Ministry of Labour and Citizens' Services. Since 2003, the Royal British Columbia Museum maintains the provincial archives as a department of the museum.

The following table lists the nine provincial archives and libraries presently operating in Canada.

Name	Photo	City	Province	Year established
Archives of Manitoba		Winnipeg	Manitoba	1971
Archives of Ontario		Toronto	Ontario	1903
Bibliothèque et Archives nationales du Québec		Montreal (Note: The provincial archives of Quebec operates 10 facilities spread throughout the province of Quebec. However, the Grande Bibliothèque in Montreal is its flagship library.)	Quebec	1920
Nova Scotia Archives		Halifax	Nova Scotia	1857
Prince of Wales Northern Heritage Centre		Yellowknife	Northwest Territories	1979
Provincial Archives of Alberta		Edmonton	Alberta	1967
Provincial Archives of New Brunswick		Fredericton	New Brunswick	1967
Provincial Archives of Saskatchewan		Regina (Note: In addition to its Regina location, the Provincial Archives of Saskatchewan operates a regional office in Saskatoon.)	Saskatchewan	1945
Public Archives and Records Office		Charlottetown	Prince Edward Island	
The Rooms		St. John's	Newfoundland and Labrador	2005

== List of other provincial and territorial museums ==
Some provinces and territories operate additional museums that serve specialized topics.

Name	Photo	City	Province	Year established	Visitors annually	Description
Ontario Science Centre		Toronto	Ontario	1969	900,225 (2019)	Interactive science centre museum for Southern Ontario.
Science North		Sudbury	Ontario	1984		Interactive science centre for Northern Ontario. Also operates Dynamic Earth (founded 2003), an interactive geology and mining museum which is the site of the Big Nickel.
Royal Tyrrell Museum of Palaeontology		Drumheller	Alberta	1985	470,000 (2016–17)	Paleontology museum and research centre.

== See also ==
- List of museums in Canada
- National museums of Canada
