= Archives of Manitoba =

Canadian provincial archives

- Archives du Manitoba
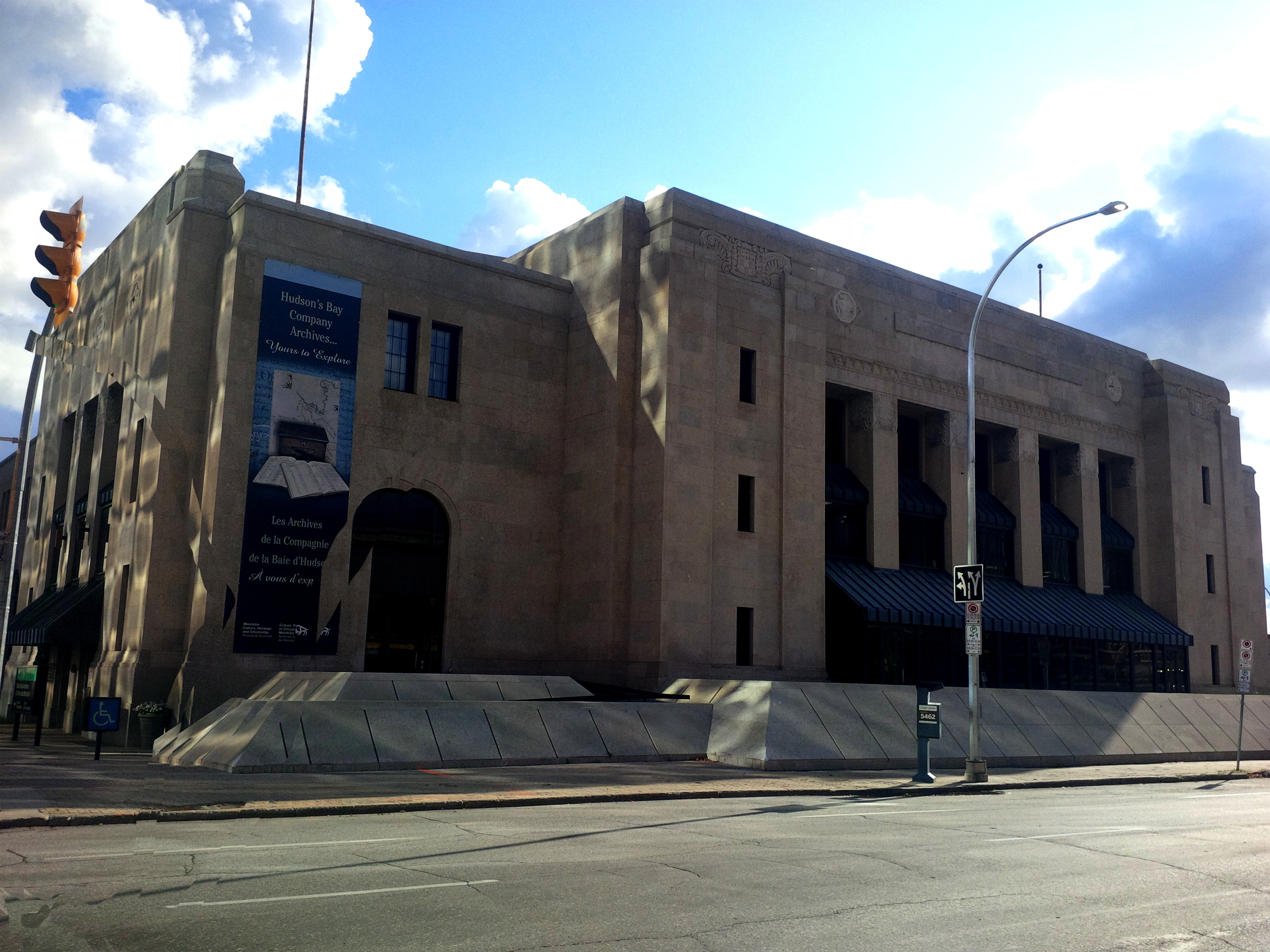
- The Manitoba Archives Building
- Former name: Library and Archives
- Established: January 12, 1971
- Location: 200 Vaughan Street; Unit 130; Winnipeg, Manitoba; R3C 1T5
- Coordinates: 49.8886°N 97.1487°W
- Type: Archive
- Collections: Hudson Bay Archives, Legislative Library
- Owner: Province of Manitoba
- Website: www.gov.mb.ca/chc/archives
- Archives of Manitoba

Agency overview
- Parent department: Manitoba Sport, Culture and Heritage
- Key document: The Archives and Recordkeeping Act

The Archives of Manitoba (French: Archives du Manitoba), formerly the Provincial Archives of Manitoba (Direction des archives provinciales) until 2003, is the official archives of the Canadian province of Manitoba. Located in the Manitoba Archives Building at 200 Vaughan Street in Winnipeg, it preserves the records of the Government of Manitoba and acquires archival records relating to the history of Manitoba.

The archives preserves the records of the provincial government as well as archives created by individuals, organizations, municipalities, school divisions, and other private-sector bodies. It is also the official repository of the Hudson's Bay Company Archives (HBCA), which preserves the historical records of the Hudson's Bay Company and related organizations dating from 1670. These collections document the political, legal, social, economic, and cultural history of Manitoba and the Canadian West.

The archives was established within the Legislative Library of Manitoba in 1939 and formally established as the Provincial Archives of Manitoba in 1952. It moved to the former Winnipeg Auditorium in 1971 and was renamed the Archives of Manitoba following the proclamation of the Archives and Recordkeeping Act in 2003.

== History ==
In 1939, the Legislative Library Act established a Public Records and Archives branch within Manitoba's Legislative Library.

In 1973, the Hudson's Bay Company decided to move its historical archives to Winnipeg, Manitoba. The official public announcement was made on 31 July 1973, and representatives of HBC and the Manitoba government signed an agreement outlining the terms under which the archives would be placed on deposit at the Provincial Archives of Manitoba. The physical transfer of the archives was completed in the autumn of 1974 and the archives were re-opened to the public in the spring of 1975.

In 1978, a federal study found that per-capita spending on the provincial archives, $252, was lower than some other provinces.

In the 1980s, with the increasing use of the modern tape recorder, the Provincial Archives established its "oral history programme" as part of its general mandate to "identify, acquire and preserve records relating to the experience of the people of Manitoba."

In 2006, the Archives of Manitoba acquired a small cache of personal, legal, business, and political records of John A. Macdonald and his son Hugh John Macdonald.

=== History of the HBCA ===
In 1920, William Schooling was hired by Hudson's Bay Company (HBC) to write a history of the company. Needing to access the company records, he was provided special premises to store the archives, as well as hiring of support staff, including Richard H.G. Leveson Gower. While the writing of an official company history was abandoned in 1926, Dominion Archivist of Canada Arthur Doughty was hired that year as a consultant to organize the HBC's archives so that selected historical records could be published. By 1927, an early version of a department of archives was in place, though it would be interrupted by the Great Depression along with the ending of Doughty's contract.

With a significant amount of work on the classification, arrangement, and cataloguing of records already accomplished, in 1931, HBC formally established an Archives Department and Leveson Gower was formally appointed the first HBC archivist. In May that year, HBC announced that the archives would be made available to the public and that researchers would be allowed direct access to records created prior to 1870. Quickly developing a classification plan for the records, HBC was able to open its archives to the public in 1933.

In 1973, the HBC decided to move its historical archives to Winnipeg, Manitoba. The official public announcement was made on 31 July 1973, and representatives of HBC and the Manitoba government signed an agreement outlining the terms under which the archives would be placed on deposit at the Provincial Archives of Manitoba. The physical transfer of the archives was completed in the autumn of 1974 and the archives were re-opened to the public in the spring of 1975.

On 21 June 2007, the Hudson's Bay Company Archives’ records were announced to have been added to the UNESCO Memory of the World Register, a programme that began to protect and promote the world's documentary heritage.

In November 2019, the HBCA completed a large-scale microfilm digitization project, with funding from the Hudson's Bay Company History Foundation.

== Leadership ==
=== Administration ===
The Archives of Manitoba is part of the Government of Manitoba and is administered by the provincial department responsible for culture and heritage. Since joining that department in 1972, the archives has remained under the responsibility of the provincial department responsible for culture and heritage, although the department has been reorganized and renamed several times. Today, it is part of Manitoba Sport, Culture and Heritage.

The Archivist of Manitoba is responsible for administering the Archives of Manitoba under the Archives and Recordkeeping Act. Before the Act came into force in 2003, responsibility for approving the retention and disposal of government records rested with the Provincial Documents Committee. Since the Act took effect, that responsibility has belonged to the Archivist of Manitoba.

=== Provincial archivists ===
The Archivist of Manitoba leads the Archives of Manitoba and is responsible for preserving and managing the province's archival records. Since the establishment of the Provincial Archives of Manitoba in 1952, the position has been held by the following individuals.

- Hartwell W. L. Bowsfield (1952–1967) was the first full-time Provincial Archivist and helped establish the Provincial Archives of Manitoba as a professional archival institution.
- John Alexander Bovey (1967–1980) served as Provincial Archivist during the relocation of the archives to the Manitoba Archives Building and the transfer of the Hudson's Bay Company Archives to Winnipeg.
- Peter Bowers (1980–1997) served during a period when the archives expanded its management of government records and established its oral history programme.
- William Gordon Dodds (1998–2008) served during the implementation of the Archives and Recordkeeping Act, which renamed the institution the Archives of Manitoba in 2003.
- Scott Goodine (2008–present) has served during a period of expanded digitization and online access to archival collections, including the completion of the Hudson's Bay Company Archives microfilm digitization project in 2019.

== Facilities ==
=== Legislative Library (1939–1971) ===
For more than 30 years, from 1939 to 1971, Manitoba's archival records were housed in the Legislative Library of Manitoba. The Legislative Library Act established a Public Records and Archives branch within the Library in 1939, and the Provincial Archives of Manitoba was formally established there 13 years later, in 1952. The archives remained in the Legislative Library for another 19 years before moving to the former Winnipeg Auditorium in 1971.

=== Manitoba Archives Building (1971–present) ===
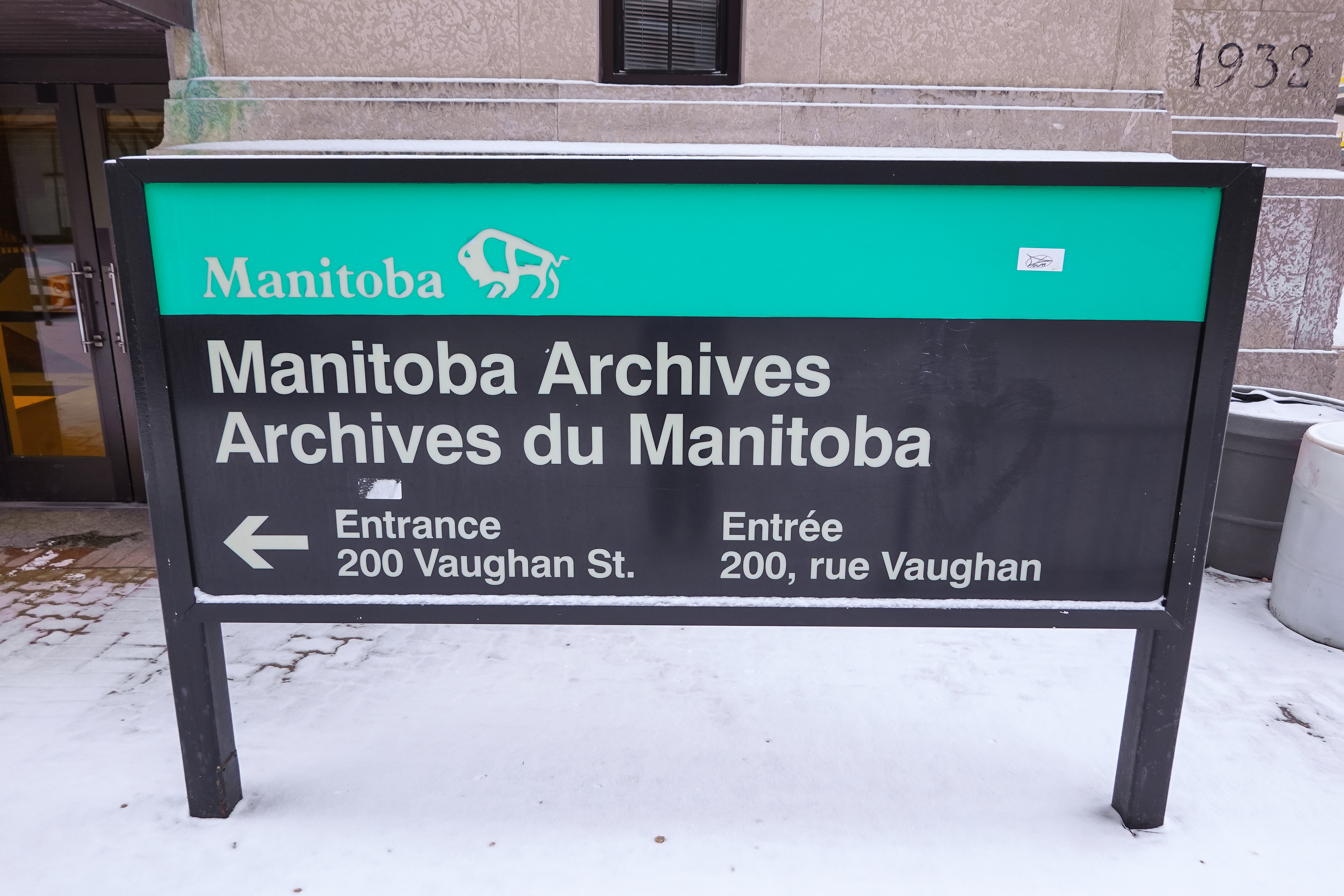
Archives sign outside the building

Since 1971, the Archives of Manitoba has been housed in the Manitoba Archives Building at 200 Vaughan Street in Winnipeg. Originally constructed as the Winnipeg Auditorium between 1931 and 1932, the building was designed by architects G. W. Northwood, C. W. U. Chivers, R. B. Pratt, D. A. Ross, and J. N. Semmens. It was built during the Great Depression as a make-work project funded jointly by the federal, provincial, and municipal governments. Its cornerstone was laid on 18 August 1932 at a ceremony attended by the Governor General of Canada, and it was officially opened on 15 October 1932 by Prime Minister R. B. Bennett.

In 1970, the Province of Manitoba purchased the Winnipeg Auditorium from the City of Winnipeg for approximately $1 million. The Archives of Manitoba and the Legislative Library of Manitoba moved into the building in 1971. Over the next four years, the province spent approximately $4 million converting the former arts and entertainment venue into an archival facility. Renovations included removing the cantilevered balconies from the main auditorium and converting the former exhibition galleries, with their large arched windows, into reading rooms for the Archives of Manitoba and the Legislative Library. Space was also reserved for the provincial Departments of Education and Agriculture for documentary and instructional film production. The building was renamed the Manitoba Archives Building and officially opened in September 1975. Today, it continues to house the Archives of Manitoba and part of the Legislative Library.

== Records management ==
From Manitoba's establishment in 1870, responsibility for managing the province's official records gradually shifted from the office of the Provincial Secretary to a dedicated archival system. Under the Provincial Secretary's Act, the Provincial Secretary served as the keeper of the province's registers and archives, while also consolidating statutes and issuing certificates and licences. In 1901, the Provincial Secretary established a register of documents filed under provincial legislation. The register recorded a synopsis of each document, where it was kept, and the legislation under which it had been filed.

By 1952, the Lieutenant Governor in Council was responsible for overseeing how government records were classified and scheduled for retention or disposal. Three years later, the Public Records Act became Manitoba's first legislation dealing specifically with the destruction, retention, and permanent preservation of public records. The Act also established the Provincial Documents Committee, which classified departmental records and prepared schedules that determined how long records were kept and when they could be disposed of.

In 1970, the Public Records Act was repealed and replaced by Part II of the Legislative Library Act. The restructured Provincial Documents Committee became responsible for records management across the provincial government and approved the Records Authority Schedule, which served as the overriding authority for the retention and disposal of government records. In 1981, the Provincial Archives of Manitoba established a Government Records Division, introducing a more effective and proactive approach to managing government records.

The Archives and Recordkeeping Act, passed in 2001 and proclaimed in February 2003, reflected changes in archival and recordkeeping practice. It renamed the Provincial Archives of Manitoba as the Archives of Manitoba and transferred responsibility for approving the retention and disposal of government records from the Provincial Documents Committee to the Archivist of Manitoba.

== Collections ==
The holdings of the Archives of Manitoba are separated into two primary centres: the Government and Private Sector Archives (GPSA) and the Hudson's Bay Company Archives (HBCA).

=== Government and Private Sector Archives ===
The Government and Private Sector Archives (GPSA) is responsible for the archival records of (1) the Government of Manitoba, (2) the province's private sector, and (3) the province's municipalities and school districts/divisions.

Records of the Manitoba government are preserved with respect to the heritage of the province. These are records that document political and legal decisions; the evolution of provincial administration; and the interaction between the government and its citizens. The archival records of the Manitoba government include the records of the Legislative Assembly, government departments and agencies, crown corporations, commissions of inquiry, and the courts. The Manitoba Archive Building also houses part of the Legislative Library of Manitoba, the other location being the Legislative Building's Reading Room.

Records of the private sector consist of the records of individuals, organizations, and community groups in Manitoba, dating back to the days of the Red River Settlement up to the more recent past. These holdings include correspondence, journals and diaries, organizational records, photographs, posters and documentary art, moving image and sound recordings (including oral histories), cartographic and architectural plans. The Archives of Manitoba also holds a large collection of historical records of the Royal Manitoba Theatre Centre, who donated them to the Archives.

In 2006, the Archives of Manitoba acquired a small cache of personal, legal, business, and political records of John A. Macdonald and his son Hugh John Macdonald. The records relating to John A. Macdonald include material from his legal practice in Kingston and his personal affairs. The latter consists of personal receipts and correspondence. Receipts include those for home and life assurance premiums, for memberships in organizations, mortgage payments, goods purchased for the home and office, and property repairs. Moreover, the records include Macdonald's account book at the Commercial Bank, 1855 to 1859, and a series of cheque stubs for the years 1863 to 1878 belonging to both Macdonald and James Shannon. The records relating to and created by Hugh John Macdonald were arranged in three series – subject files on personal matters, miscellaneous office files relating to clients, and records of a number of companies which Macdonald and his legal partners were investors or directors of the company. The subject files contain, among other things, tax notices and receipts from the City of Winnipeg for Macdonald's home at 61 Carlton Street.

=== Hudson's Bay Company Archives ===
The Hudson's Bay Company Archives (HBCA) is the official repository for the records of the Hudson's Bay Company (HBC)—the oldest chartered trading company in the world—and includes thousands of mainly hand-written records and maps of HBC employees from 1670 to 1920, spanning the first 250 years of HBC's history. Along with archival records of the Hudson's Bay Company itself, the HBCA acquires and preserves other records related to HBC history as well, such as private records of individuals and subsidiary companies (including the North West Company).

The records of the HBCA provide the original written history of the Hudson's Bay Company since its inception in 1670 by royal charter of Prince Rupert and others, as well as how the company would grow to the point of purchasing Rupert's Land—the largest land purchase in Canada's history and one of the largest in world history.

The archives also preserve original written documents that detail the fur trade; European exploration, mapping, and settlement of the western frontier; Indigenous peoples; treaty-making; and the initial development of what would become Canada. Many of these documents provide detailed descriptions of native groups, forts, rivers, lakes, animals, populations, and the difficult working conditions of fur traders.

This important archive is one of Canada's national treasures, and is a part of the United Nations Memory of the World project. HBCA operations are partly funded through the ongoing financial support of the Hudson's Bay Company History Foundation. In 2019, the HBC History Foundation funded HBCA's large-scale microfilm digitization project. This project saw HBCA digitize 1052 reels of microfilm, consisting of more than 10,000 volumes of the pre-1870 records kept at almost 500 HBC posts. Records that were digitized were selected for the project due to being some of the most heavily accessed records held by HBCA.

Some records available through the Hudson's Bay Company Archives include:

- Francis Heron's account of the Red River Flood of 1826 — Francis Heron, a HBC clerk at Upper Fort Garry (present-day Winnipeg), documented the Red River flood of 1826 in a journal, providing a rare eyewitness account of the destruction that nearly wiped out the Red River Colony in minutes.
- The Hudson's Bay Company and Winnipeg's Urban Landscape — HBCA have documented the HBC's impact on Winnipeg's urban development. For instance, blueprint plans by local architect John Woodman show the elevations of two of the outbuildings that surrounded HBC's first Winnipeg department store (built in 1881) at the corner of Main Street and York Avenue.
- Peter Fidler and the Selkirk Treaty — HBC surveyor and post master Peter Fidler wrote about many notable events in the Brandon House journal of 1817–1818, including the Selkirk Treaty.
- Philip Turnor's Map — A large composite map was created by Philip Turnor in 1794 at the end of his career as the HBC's first official surveyor. The map exhibited most of the first inland exploratory knowledge collected by the HBC at the time.
- The Selkirk Treaty and Map — On 18 July 1817, Lord Selkirk signed a treaty with 5 Indigenous leaders that would establish the Red River Settlement. This treaty is the first formal written agreement in Western Canada recognizing Indigenous land rights. The treaty, as well as a map of the settlement, are two of the legal records relating to the Red River Settlement that were probably acquired by the Archives Department of the HBC from HBC's solicitors in 1923.
- Seven Oaks & HBCA Records: 1816-2016 — The Pemmican Proclamation were issued on 8 January 1814, largely triggering years of conflict among the HBC and the North West Company (NWC), the two main actors of the Canadian fur trade. As hostilities continued to escalate, the two sides met on 19 June 1816 in a violent confrontation at Seven Oaks (now in the area of West Kildonan, Winnipeg). For the 200th anniversary of the Battle of Seven Oaks, the HBCA highlighted records that document the 'Pemmican Wars' era, mainly written from the point of view of HBC servants who eye-witnessed these events.

== Exhibits ==
=== Manitoba 150 ===
Commemorating the 150th anniversary of the founding of Manitoba, and the 350th of the Hudson's Bay Company, the Archives of Manitoba dedicated its 2020 exhibit, titled Your Archives: The Histories We Share, to submissions from the public. For the exhibit, people were asked to choose an archival record and explain "why it matters." Selected submissions would then be featured on the Archives' blog, social media, and in their physical exhibit.

In February, the Archives held a screening event at Winnipeg's Metropolitan Theatre, titled 'Films from the Archives', where they showed The Romance of the Far Fur Country (1920) and the "100th anniversary screening of highlights from the Hudson’s Bay Company film."

=== Streaming from the Archives ===
On Manitoba Day (May 12), the Archives launched its Streaming from the Archives feature—uploading digitized films and videos from the Archives' holdings, including the HBCA, for public viewing online. To begin, the Archives featured 6 films that "illustrate a range of activities and iconic sites throughout Manitoba."

Subsequent uploads since its launch took place in July and December 2020, introduced through more 'Films from the Archives' events, this time held online due to provincial COVID-19 restrictions. On December 9, three "home movies" from the Archives were presented, respectively showing Norway House in the 1930s, Winnipeg during the 1950 flood, and Queen Elizabeth II visiting Brandon in 1959. On December 16, three government "promotional films" from the 1940s, 1950s, and 1960s were presented: one documenting a survey group in northern Manitoba; another, a fashion show featuring made-in-Manitoba designs; and the last, "indoor and outdoor activities to enjoy in Manitoba in winter."

Select films, Streaming from the Archives
Film	Time length	Production	Description
“The Mark of Distinction” (c. 1959)	5m 50s	Produced by Francis J. Holmes for the Sanatorium Board of Manitoba	A film created to educate the public on the need for tuberculin testing to prevent the spread of tuberculosis.
"The Road to Recovery" (c. 1950)	36m 31s	Produced by Francis J. Holmes for the Sanatorium Board of Manitoba	A film created to show testing and treatment for tuberculosis in Manitoba. It includes members of the Sanatorium Board, people undergoing x-rays, the Mobile X-Ray Unit, and blood being analyzed in a lab, various medical facilities, and footage from vocational classes in Winnipeg.
"Commercial Fishing in Manitoba" (c. 1945–46)	38m 2s	Department of Mines and Natural Resources	A silent film showing how the commercial fishing industry operated in Manitoba in the 1940s.
"Vacation Attractions in the Whiteshell Forest Reserve of Eastern Manitoba" (1934)	26m 44s	Produced by Percy F. Brown for the Department of Public Works	A silent film promoting the Trans-Canada Highway No. 1 between Winnipeg and the Ontario border as a route to access the Whiteshell Forest Reserve by car.
"Opening Day of the Bay's Portage and Memorial Store" (1926)	10m	Excerpt created by British Pictorial Production Ltd in 1931 for HBC	An excerpt from a film entitled From the Fur North, showing exterior footage of the opening of the Hudson's Bay Company's store on Portage and Memorial in November 1926.
Highlights from Impressions (1970)	7m 22s	Directed by Christopher Chapman for the Hudson's Bay Company	Highlights from the HBC film called Impressions, which was created as part of the HBC's 300th anniversary celebrations in 1970.
Murray Sinclair's closing statement after the community hearings conducted during Manitoba's Aboriginal Justice Inquiry (1989)	9m 45s		A video excerpt of closing remarks by Associate Chief Judge Murray Sinclair during the Aboriginal Justice Inquiry community hearings (1989 April 28).
“The Salad Bowl” (1965)	21m	Department of Agriculture and Conservation	A film illustrating the operation of Manitoba's vegetable industry, highlighting the events of “Salad Month” which encouraged Manitobans to enjoy the province's vegetables.
"The Legislative Assembly" (1953)	13m 31s	Department of Industry and Commerce	A film showing the "history, tradition and procedure of the Legislative Assembly of Manitoba," including footage of the opening of the Assembly and of the House in session, Lieutenant-Governor Roland McWilliams, and Premier Douglas Campbell.
Clair Leatherdale home movie of 1950 Winnipeg flood (1950)	10m 44s		A silent film consisting of home-movie footage taken by Clair Leatherdale showing the 1950 flooding of Winnipeg. The footage shows flood levels over several days and the aftermath of the flooding. The last three minutes are shot from a powerboat on the Red River and show flood levels around buildings along Kingston Row and Churchill Drive, including the site of what is now the Riverview Health Centre.
"Manitoba Fights for Freedom" (1944)	32m 56s	Department of Mines and Natural Resources	A film outlining the war effort in Manitoba: people at work in munitions factories, meat plants, garment factories, and airplane manufacturing, as well as men in paratroop and artillery training, and men and women marching in military units.
Churchill (1931–33)	80m 37s		A silent film consisting of footage by civil engineer George Coutts, who was involved in the construction of the port and grain storage facilities at Churchill, Manitoba. It documents, among other things, construction progress; Coutts' 1931 journey from The Pas to Churchill on the Hudson Bay Railway; the arrival, loading, and departure of various ships; and an overnight refueling stop by Charles and Anne Morrow Lindbergh, who were en route to Japan, in 1933.
"The Voyage of the Nonsuch" (1968)	27m 01s	Nonsuch Films Limited	A film tracing the construction, launching, and sailing of the replica Nonsuch ship, which was built to commemorate the Hudson's Bay Company's 300th anniversary.

=== Exhibits 995 to 1000 ===
The Exhibits 995 to 1000 (French: Pièces 995 à 1000) displays enlarged versions of six of the photographs entered as exhibits in the 1920 trial of R. v. Ivens et al, which followed the Winnipeg General Strike of 1919.

Approximately 30,000 workers went on strike in Winnipeg for nearly six weeks from 15 May 1919. Many leaders of the strike were arrested on 17 June 1919, and the strike would end on 25 June 1919. The leaders were tried in the Court of King's Bench, and most were found guilty and sentenced to up to two years in prison. The Archives of Manitoba holds numerous records that document the 1919 General Strike, including those entered as exhibits in the Court of King's Bench trial of the strike leaders, including R. v. Ivens et al.

The six photographs presented in this exhibit were taken by professional photographer L. B. Foote on 21 June 1919, or "Bloody Saturday." The photos show the crowds, the streetcar, and some of the events of the day. The photos are stamped with a Court of King's Bench exhibit stamp on the back, on which the exhibit number and the clerk's initials are recorded. The photographs are contact prints (i.e., proofs) of 4 by 6 inches (10 cm × 15 cm) in size, and were likely printed from the original negatives specifically for the court case.

=== Other exhibits ===
The Manitoba Legislative Building: Photographing a Work in Progress features reproductions of 34 of photos taken by L. B. Foote, who was commissioned by the Manitoba government to document the construction of the Legislative Building through photographs. The photos were mostly taken between 1915 and 1916.

Remembering the First World War (2014–2018) were weekly blogs about the time of the First World War, documenting activities both at home and overseas. In 2015, commemorating the 100th anniversary of WWI and Remembrance Day, Archives of Manitoba held a public reading of letters written by Manitoba soldiers who served in the War.

Rearview Manitoba is an exhibit that showcases Manitobans who were revealed in records held by the Archives of Manitoba.

The Sessional Journal of the Legislative Assembly of Assiniboia are one of the key documents held at the Archives of Manitoba relating to the 1870 Legislative Assembly, the first Manitoba Legislature. The journal contains a record of the proceedings of the Assembly, from the first meeting of the First Session on 9 March 1870 until the last meeting of the Third Session on 24 June 1870. This journal was purchased for $40 by the Legislative Library—which was also responsible for the province's archival records at the time—in 1939 from E. R. James of Rosser, Manitoba.

== See also ==
Government archives in Canada

- Library and Archives Canada
- Provincial Archives of Alberta
- British Columbia Archives
- Archives of Ontario
- Provincial Archives of New Brunswick
- Provincial Archives of Newfoundland and Labrador
- Nova Scotia Archives and Records Management
- Public Archives and Records Office (Prince Edward Island)
- Bibliothèque et Archives nationales du Québec
- Provincial Archives of Saskatchewan

Archival organizations in Manitoba

- Association for Manitoba Archives
- Fort Garry Horse Museum & Archives
- Manitoba Historical Society
- University of Manitoba Archives & Special Collections
