= HBCA =

HBCA may refer to:

- Huntington Beach, California, city in California and the United States
- Hudson's Bay Company Archives, collection of historical records from the Hudson's Bay Company
