= Manitoba Film and Music =

Agency overview
- Preceding agency: Cultural Industries Development Office
- Headquarters: Suite 410 - 93 Lombard Avenue Winnipeg, MB
- Agency executives: Lynne Skromeda, CEO and Film Commissioner; Kevin Gabriel, Chief Operating Officer
- Parent department: Manitoba Sport, Culture and Heritage
- Website: mbfilmmusic.ca

Manitoba Film and Music (MFM), officially Manitoba Film & Sound Recording Development Corporation, is the primary support for the film and television sector of Manitoba, and runs the provincial film commission. As a Crown corporation, it is funded by the provincial government through the Department of Sport, Culture and Heritage.

Overseen by a nine-member board of directors, MFM's purpose is to foster, develop, and promote the film- and sound-recording industries of Manitoba. MFM administers the tax credit for film & video production on behalf of the Manitoba government; delivers film funding and equity programs; and provides location packages and scouting services.

MFM is a member of the Association of Film Commissioners International (AFCI).

== History ==
Established in 1987, Manitoba Film and Music was originally created as a joint initiative between Manitoba and the Government of Canada, and was known as the Cultural Industries Development Office. It became a not-for-profit corporation in 1992, and acquired its current status in 1998.

MFM reported CA$173 million in production revenue for 2017. The following year, MFM's funding was reduced to $3.58 million from $3.87 million in 2017. Considering the allocation of public funding, in early December 2018, the Manitoba government also ordered a review of the effectiveness of Manitoba Film and Music.

Further helping MFM in its gains, on 15 January 2019, Manitoba Culture Minister Cathy Cox announced that the provincial government would be making permanent its Film and Video Tax Credit, which reduces film-makers labour costs, encouraging productions to use local talent, which in turn allows local artists to find employment closer to home. That year, Manitoba Film and Music projected a record high in revenue, looking at “a quarter billion" dollars.
