= Manitoba Sport, Culture and Heritage =

Provincial government department in Manitoba, Canada

Manitoba Sport, Culture, Heritage and Tourism
- Sport, Culture, et Patrimoine
- Logo of predecessor Manitoba Culture, Heritage and Tourism

Department overview
- Preceding agencies: Manitoba Culture, Heritage, Tourism and Sport; Manitoba Sport, Culture and Heritage
- Jurisdiction: Government of Manitoba
- Headquarters: Winnipeg, Manitoba
- Employees: 253.75 FTE
- Annual budget: $68 million CAD (2009-2010)
- Minister responsible: Nellie Kennedy, Minister of Sport, Culture and Heritage and Tourism;
- Deputy Minister responsible: Jeff Hnatiuk
- Website: www.gov.mb.ca/chc

Manitoba Sport, Culture, Heritage and Tourism (French: Sport, Culture, et Patrimoine; formerly Manitoba Sport, Culture and Heritage and Manitoba Culture, Heritage, Tourism and Sport) is the department of the Government of Manitoba responsible for managing government programs and services that support the sport, art, culture, and heritage of the province, through developing, supporting, promoting, and celebrating the identity and well-being of Manitoba and its communities.

More specifically, sport refers both to the fitness and well-being for individuals as well as to the uniting of people in the spirit of competition and community pride; culture reflects the "societal values and shared humanity" within Manitoba; and heritage represents the history of Manitoba and its relation to the province's present and future.

The department is overseen by the Minister of Sport, Culture, Heritage and Tourism, who has been Glen Simard since his appointment in October 2023.

== Branches ==
- Archives of Manitoba
- Arts Branch — along with funding the arts and cultural organizations of Manitoba, the branch assists and supports community initiatives regarding the study, creation, production, exhibition, and publication of works in the arts. The branch also delivers support to the development of Manitoba's film and sound recording, publishing, visual arts, and crafts industries, including support to Manitoba Film and Sound.
- Historic Resources Branch — provides support for facilities that serve to protect and interpret Manitoba's heritage resources; produces publications and research related to Manitoba's heritage, often in partnership with other heritage organizations; provides grants to assist in identifying, protecting, and interpreting Manitoba's human and natural heritage.
  - The Manitoba Heritage Trust Program offers provincial support with matching grants of $1 for every $2 raised by community museums, archives, and supporting organizations. Initiated by the provincial government, the program is administered by The Winnipeg Foundation along with rural community foundations in Manitoba and with support from the Association of Manitoba Museums and the Association for Manitoba Archives.
- Multiculturalism Secretariat — advances the goals of the Manitoba Multiculturalism Act by promoting awareness of the province's cultural diversity and by working with ethnocultural organizations to build capacity and support community development through funding, information sessions, and organizational support.
- Public Library Services Branch (PLSB) — responsible to the Minister to ensure Manitoba libraries are following related laws and standards, aiming to foster and strengthen the network of community-based public library services in the province. The PLSB is governed by The Public Libraries Act and associated regulations.
- Status of Women Secretariat

=== Legislative Library of Manitoba ===
Legislative Library of Manitoba
- Location: Archives of Manitoba, rm 100 - 200 Vaughan St; Manitoba Legislative Building, rm 260 - 450 Broadway
- Type: Provincial library
- Established: 1870
- Branch of: Department of Sport, Culture, Heritage and Tourism, Government of Manitoba

Other information
- Director: Scott Goodine, Acting Provincial Librarian
- Website: www.gov.mb.ca/chc/leg-lib/index.html

The Legislative Library of Manitoba promotes and preserves knowledge of the province's published heritage. Under the current Legislative Library Act, S.M. 2008, c. 12, the Library collects and preserves the print and electronic versions of documents published by Manitoba government departments, agencies, boards, commissions, and independent offices of the Legislative Assembly, as well as publications from Manitoba's book, magazine, and newspaper publishers. The Legislative Library has two locations that are open to Members and staff of the Legislative Assembly, to government employees, and to the public. Following the National Library of Canada's regional meetings on resource sharing, Manitoba's Legislative Library became one of the founding members of the Manitoba Library Consortium.

==== History of the Legislative Library ====
The Legislative Library is Manitoba's oldest library and one of the major resource libraries in the province. It was established by the first Lieutenant-Governor of Manitoba, Adams G. Archibald. Prior to leaving Ottawa to take on his new duties, Archibald employed the help of Parliamentary Librarian Alpheus Todd in buying publications that would support the work of the new Legislative Assembly. Though originally planning to place this library in the residence of the Lieutenant-Governor, Archibald decided instead to make it the center of a Provincial Library and had the books placed in the Government Offices instead. After his arrival, Archibald learned of a much older book collection, the Library of the Red River Settlement, founded by Lord Selkirk and originally used by the Red River Settlers. Archibald would purchase the collection from a local citizen who had been storing it in his home.

Bernard R. Ross would be appointed Provincial Librarian around 1870, succeeded by Felix Trudel and George Roy. As these men all had other responsibilities, it was not until 1884 that John Palmerston Robertson was appointed the province's first Legislative Librarian. Over the next three-and-a-half decades, Robertson would build up the Library's collections of books and government publications; establish exchange agreements with other libraries and governments; and promoted the Library's role as a collector of published and unpublished records of Manitoba's history. He established the Provincial Archives, as well as a map and museum collection, and planned for the Library's new quarters in the Legislative Building. Robertson, however, would die before the move took place in 1919.

Robertson was succeeded upon his death by W. J. Healy, who built up the Library's collections in the social sciences and economics, as well as introducing the use of a card catalogue to replace the book-catalogues system. During the Great Depression, budgets and subscriptions to newspapers were cut. However, the Library's collections continued to expand due to the exchange agreements established with other libraries and institutions, as well as provision in the Provincial Library and Museum Act of 1919 requiring that all Manitoba publications be deposited with the Library. This legal deposit program continues under the authority of the current statute, The Legislative Library Act, which enables the Library to collect and preserve a research collection of Manitoba publications.

Tannis Gretzinger, in spring 2011, became the 8th Legislative Librarian, and would retired in spring 2014. Since then, Provincial Archivist Scott Goodine has been the Acting Legislative Librarian.

== Agencies, Boards, and Commissions ==
The following are the Agencies, Boards and Commissions to which Manitoba Sport, Culture and Heritage makes appointments (those with * are also composed of external/stakeholder appointments):

- Centennial Centre Corporation
- Manitoba Film Classification Board
- Film and Sound Recording Development Corporation (Manitoba Film and Sound)
- Manitoba Museum*
- Winnipeg Art Gallery
- Women's Advisory Council
- Advisory Council on Citizenship, Immigration and Multiculturalism* — responsible for providing information, advice, and recommendations to the Manitoba Government, through the Minister of Sport, Culture and Heritage, on matters relating to "citizenship and immigration, including the attraction of immigrants to Manitoba and the retention of immigrants, the long-term settlement and integration of immigrants, and the full inclusion and participation of immigrants" in the economic, social, and cultural life of Manitoba and "matters relating to multiculturalism, including intercultural relations and ethnic and linguistic diversity." The council, established under the Manitoba Advisory Council on Citizenship, Immigration and Multiculturalism Act, is chaired by Christina Semaniuk.
- Brandon Manitoba Centennial Auditorium* — responsible for operating a centre for the performing arts serving the city of Brandon and western Manitoba.
- Centre Culturel Franco-Manitobain* — a governance board responsible for presenting, promoting, fostering, and sponsoring cultural and artistic activities in the French language for all Manitobans; as well as managing and developing the facilities within the area where the corporation has jurisdiction. The board is chaired by Réal Cure.
- Combative Sports Commission (formerly Manitoba Boxing Commission) — responsible for regulating all contests and exhibitions of professional boxing and mixed martial arts matches in the province in accordance with regulations as set out in the Boxing Act. The commission was incorporated under the provisions of the Manitoba government by a proclamation dated 16 October 1993.
- Heritage Council — provides impartial, objective advice to the Minister on matters relating to The Heritage Resources Act by recommending the identification, protection, and commemoration of people, places, events, artifacts, and structures that best represent significant aspects of Manitoba's historical development. The council is chaired by Sharon Reilly.
- Public Library Advisory Board* — tasked with advising and making recommendations to the Minister regarding all matters outlined in the Public Libraries Act.
- A ministerial representative and the Public Library Services Branch's director participate on the Board and support the appointed members in developing advice for the Minister. The branch also provides administrative support to coordinate meetings and develop board policy.

=== Manitoba Arts Council ===
The Manitoba Arts Council (French: Conseil des arts du Manitoba) is an arm's-length governance board of the Province of Manitoba, funded through Manitoba Sport, Culture and Heritage, that is responsible for promoting the study, enjoyment, production, and performance of works in the arts through grants, scholarships, or loans. The council, established in 1965, is chaired by Roberta Christianson.

Assessed by artistic merit, the Council makes awards to professional arts organizations, educators, and individuals in all art forms, including theatre, literature, dance, music, painting, sculpture, architecture, and graphic arts. The Council uses a peer assessment process in making awards. Historically, the main criterion used to assess applications is artistic merit.

=== Sport Manitoba ===
Sport Manitoba is a nonprofit corporation responsible for implementing the Manitoba government's sport policy and for developing and carrying out an annual business plan, approved by the province. More specifically, its mandate focuses on the planning, programming, and funding of amateur sports, and the continued development of athletes, coaches, officials, and volunteers. The corporation is currently chaired by David Patsack.

Government and corporate-sector funding for organized sports began in 1961. In 1976, the first Manitoba Summer Games were held in Neepawa. Sport Manitoba itself would be incorporated in 1996, becoming the umbrella entity for all amateur sport in the province. Its creation would come as result of a merger between the member-based organization, Manitoba Sports Federation and its government counterpart, Manitoba Sport Directorate.

In 2011, the Sport Manitoba Clinic and Manitoba Sports Hall of Fame were opened at 145 Pacific Avenue, Winnipeg, followed by the Paul Robson Resource Centre for Leadership & Coaching in 2012 and Sport Manitoba Performance Centre for athlete development and training in 2014. Also in 2014, Sport Manitoba became the first non-profit sport organization in Canada to receive Imagine Canada Standard's program accreditation. In 2017, as part of a larger province-wide project to host the Canada Summer Games, Sport Manitoba and its partners began construction on a state-of-the-art sports complex, named the Qualico Training Centre, to serve as a center for education, skill-building, and research in Manitoba.

== History ==
The Department of Tourism and Recreation was created in 1966 by adopting the Travel and Publicity Branch from the Department of Industry and Commerce, the Parks Branch from the Department of Mines and Natural Resources, and the Fitness and Amateur Sports Branch from the Department of Welfare. The latter branch was renamed the Community Recreation Branch to reflect its expanded responsibilities for all forms of community recreation. An Administrative Branch was also created within the new department. The department was responsible for promoting, developing, and expanding tourism and public recreation; creating and administering parks and recreation facilities; and encouraging physical fitness and all forms amateur sports, excluding hunting and fishing, which laid outside the Department's jurisdiction. In 1968, a Research and Planning Branch was added and charged with providing essential research data to give direction to the planning of departmental programs.

In 1970, the functions of the Departments of Tourism and Recreation and of Cultural Affairs were assumed by the newly created Department of Tourism, Recreation and Cultural Affairs. This new department was responsible for ensuring the provision of beneficial leisure-time recreational opportunities, including tourism and cultural pursuits, to the citizens of Manitoba and to visitors. The department also oversaw cultural institutions such as public library services, the Legislative Library, and the Archives of Manitoba. In 1972, the research and planning functions of the department were reorganized under an additional Assistant Deputy Minister, and greater emphasis was given to policy formation, program evaluation, and long-term planning.

=== Separation of recreation and cultural affairs ===
In 1978, the tourism and cultural functions of the Department of Tourism, Recreation and Cultural Affairs were transferred to the new Department of Tourism and Cultural Affairs, while the recreation component was transferred to the newly formed Department of Fitness, Recreation, and Sport, where all functions relating to fitness and sport were consolidated with recreation.

The mandate of the Department of Fitness, Recreation and Sport was to assist communities, sports-governing bodies, and recreational associations to develop recreational opportunities in Manitoba. Moreover, the department encouraged and developed opportunities for Manitobans to attain a greater level of fitness. In 1983, recreation merged again with culture to form the Department of Culture, Heritage and Recreation, whereby the Fitness and Sport functions both became directorates, responsible to the designated Minister.

The Department of Tourism and Cultural Affairs was responsible for administering the province's heritage resources, overseeing the tourism industry of Manitoba, providing opportunities for Manitobans to participate in various cultural pursuits, and supervising selected provincial cultural institutions. Through its Historic Resources Branch, the Department identified, protected, interpreted, and promoted Manitoba's heritage resources; through its Tourism Branch, the department marketed and encouraged development of the tourism industry in the province; and through its Cultural Affairs Division, the department oversaw the administration of all major cultural grants, signed cultural agreements with foreign countries, and oversaw the operations of public library services, the Legislative Library, and the Archives of Manitoba.

The Tourism and Cultural Affairs Department only existed during the 1978/79 fiscal year, as it ceased operation when its tourism functions were absorbed by the new Department of Economic Development and Tourism and its cultural functions were transferred to the new Department of Cultural Affairs and Historical Resources.

The Department of Cultural Affairs and Historic Resources (French: Le ministere des Affaires culturelles et du Patrimoine) provided financial and advisory assistance to cultural organizations, as well as to multicultural groups and communities. Moreover, the department's responsibilities included liaison with community arts councils, municipal councils, recreation groups, community service clubs, and ethnocultural organizations. The department's divisions included:

- Cultural Development Division
- Historic Resources Division
- Public Library Services Division
- Management Services Division

=== Culture, Heritage and Recreation ===
Culture, Heritage and Recreation (French: Culture, Patrimoine et Loisirs) was established in August 1983, when the Department of Cultural Affairs and Historic Resources merged with the Recreation and Regional Services sections of the former Department of Fitness, Recreation and Sport. In order to streamline service delivery and to improve the management of the organization, the department was structured into five operating divisions:

- Historic Resources Division
- Recreation Services Division
- Cultural Resources Division (succeeding the former Cultural Development Division)
- Grants Administration Division
- Public Library Services Division.

In 1983, the Queen's Printer fell under the responsibility of the department as well. By 1985, the department also became responsible for Information Services, Advertising Audit Office, Statutory Publications, and all print and preparatory purchasing functions.

In February 1991, now with the responsibilities of immigration/settlement and adult language training added to its purview, the department's name was changed to the Department of Culture, Heritage and Citizenship (French: Culture, Patrimoine et Citoyennete). The department's five divisions now became:

- Provincial Services Division
- Citizenship and Multiculturalism Division
- Culture, Heritage and Recreation Programs Division
- Information Resources Division
- Administration and Finance Division.

=== Creation of the Sport Secretariat ===
While recreation was also added to the Department of Culture, Heritage and Citizenship, the fitness and sport functions each became directorates, responsible to a designated minister. As such, the Sport Directorate was formed in 1983, when the Department of Fitness, Recreation and Sport was disestablished. The function of this Directorate was to assist provincial and regional sport associations to develop activities. The Directorate worked collaboratively with other government departments, the City of Winnipeg and the Manitoba Sports Federation.

In 1996, the Sport Directorate merged with the Manitoba Sports Federation to form Sport Manitoba Incorporated, though a Minister Responsible for Sport and government body remained in order to oversee the incorporated charitable organization. Simultaneously, the Sport Secretariat (aka the Department of Sport) was created to oversee Sport Manitoba and facilitate intergovernmental sporting activities and events, such as the Pan American Games and the Western Canada Summer Games.

Along with funding Sport Manitoba and ensuring that the organization is fulfilling its responsibility to the provincial sport policy, the Secretariat also funds and facilitates major sporting events in the province and serves as administrative support to the Manitoba Boxing Commission.

=== Culture, Heritage and Tourism ===
==== 1995–2005 ====
In 1999, Department of Culture, Heritage and Citizenship was succeeded by Culture, Heritage and Tourism (CHT; French: Culture, Patrimoine et du Tourism), taking on the Tourism Division function from the Department of Industry, Trade and Tourism, while transferring the Citizenship and Multicultural Division to the Department of Labour and Immigration.

The five divisions of this new Department were:

- Culture, Heritage and Recreation Programs Division
- Tourism Division
- Information Resources Division
- Provincial Services Division
- Administration and Finance Division

These divisions and their branches were purposed to encourage and facilitate activities involving Manitoba's heritage, tourism, culture, recreation, wellness, and library and artistic endeavours. Several boards and agencies would report to the Minister of CHT, including: Centre Culturel Franco-Manitobain, Manitoba Arts Council, Manitoba Centennial Centre Corporation, and the Manitoba Film Classification Board.

Also, beginning in 2001, the Minister responsible for Sport was also the Minister of Culture, Heritage and Tourism.

==== 2005–2008 ====
In 2005, CHT would undergo significant structural changes as a result of the Travel Manitoba Act (proclaimed November 2004; effective 1 April 2005), which created Travel Manitoba, a Crown agency tasked with the further development and promotion of tourism in the province. Travel Manitoba assumed many of the functions of the former Tourism Division, though a Tourism Secretariat remained with CHT to oversee policy and planning, as well as to serve as a liaison with other levels of government.

Now, CHT was composed of four divisions and one secretariat:

- Administration and Finance division
- Culture, Heritage & Recreation Programs division
- Provincial Services division
- Communication Services Manitoba
- Tourism Secretariat

Responsibilities of the CHT included: the Archives of Manitoba and the Hudson's Bay Company Archives; the Legislative Library of Manitoba; support for arts and cultural activity; and Manitoba Government Inquiry for the general public; as well as government media services, news releases, communications and advertising.

=== Culture, Heritage, Tourism, and Sport ===
In 2008, the Department of Culture, Heritage and Tourism reorganized and amalgamated with the Department of Sport, becoming Culture, Heritage, Tourism, and Sport (CHTS), thus formalizing the long-standing working relationship between the two departments.

This new department was composed of four divisions and three secretariats:

- Administration and Finance Division,
- Culture, Heritage & Recreation Programs Division,
- Provincial Services Division,
- Communication Services Manitoba; and
- Tourism Secretariat,
- Sport Secretariat,
- Information and Protection of Privacy Secretariat (IPPS).

The Tourism Secretariat operated within CHTS to oversee policy and planning; the Sport Secretariat provided coordination and delivery of grants to Sport Manitoba and other major sport initiatives, while also assisting in the development of sport-related policies and initiatives; and IPPS provided expertise in the provincial government on information accessibility, confidentiality, and privacy policy issues, as well as support services to other public bodies.

=== 2009 and after ===
In 2009, the Minister of CHTS Eric Robinson would retain the responsibility for the Sport Secretariat when he transferred to the Department of Aboriginal and Northern Affairs. As recreation programs likewise transferred to the Department of Healthy Living, Youth and Seniors, the Department of Culture, Heritage, Tourism, and Sport was reorganized and renamed Culture, Tourism and Heritage.

In 2013, the Sport Secretariat became part of the Department of Tourism, Culture, Heritage, Sport and Consumer Protection.

In 2016, Tourism, Culture, Heritage, Sport and Consumer Protection would become the Department of Sport, Culture and Heritage.

== See also ==
- Department of Canadian Heritage
- Alberta Culture, Multiculturalism, and Status of Women
- Ministry of Heritage, Sport, Tourism and Culture Industries (Ontario)
- Ministry of Culture and Communications (Quebec)
  - Quebec Cultural Heritage Directory
  - Société de développement des entreprises culturelles
- Department of Tourism, Heritage and Culture (New Brunswick)
- Nunavut Public Library Services
