= L. B. Foote =

Canadian photographer

- Born: Lewis Benjamin Foote; February 6, 1873; Foote's Cove, Pardy's Island, Burin Newfoundland
- Died: April 22, 1957 (aged 84); Winnipeg, Manitoba, Canada
- Occupation: Photographer

Lewis Benjamin Foote (February 6, 1873 – April 22, 1957) was a Canadian photographer, best known for his black-and-white photographs of early Winnipeg, including royal visits, the Winnipeg General Strike, and slums.

He was born on February 6, 1874, in Foote's Cove, Pardy's Island, Burin, Newfoundland, and worked on the Summerside Journal where he first became a photographer. He moved to Winnipeg in 1902, where he became the city's best known commercial photographer. For more than half a century his photographs chronicled the development of the city. He is most well known for his photographs of the 1919 Winnipeg General Strike and was active until 1947. His buried in Winnipeg's Elmwood Cemetery.
