= Fort Garry Horse Museum & Archives =

Coordinates: 49.9277°N 97.1400°W

The Fort Garry Horse Museum & Archives
- Location: Lieutenant-Colonel Harcus Strachan, VC, MC Armoury, 551 Machray Avenue, Winnipeg, Manitoba, Canada
- Type: regimental museum
- Website: The Fort Garry Horse Museum & Archives

The Fort Garry Horse Museum & Archives is a regimental museum in Winnipeg, Manitoba, Canada that displays the history of The Fort Garry Horse, a regiment of the Canadian Forces Army, from its origin to the present through use of artefacts, photographs and archival material.

Located in the LCol Harcus Strachan, VC, MC Armoury(formerly named McGregor Armoury), the museum's exhibits include uniforms, weapons, military artefacts and photographs, as well as some military vehicles outdoors.

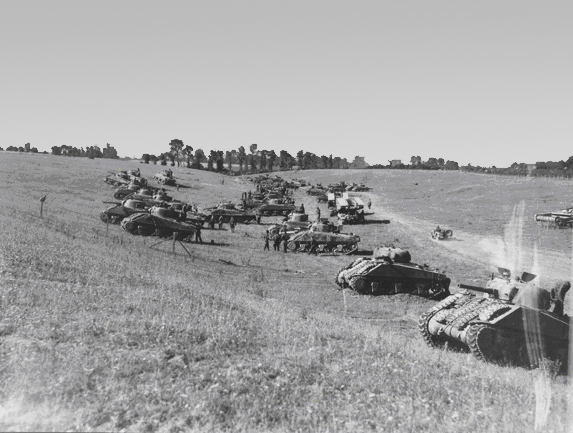
Tanks concentration of the Fort Garry Horse

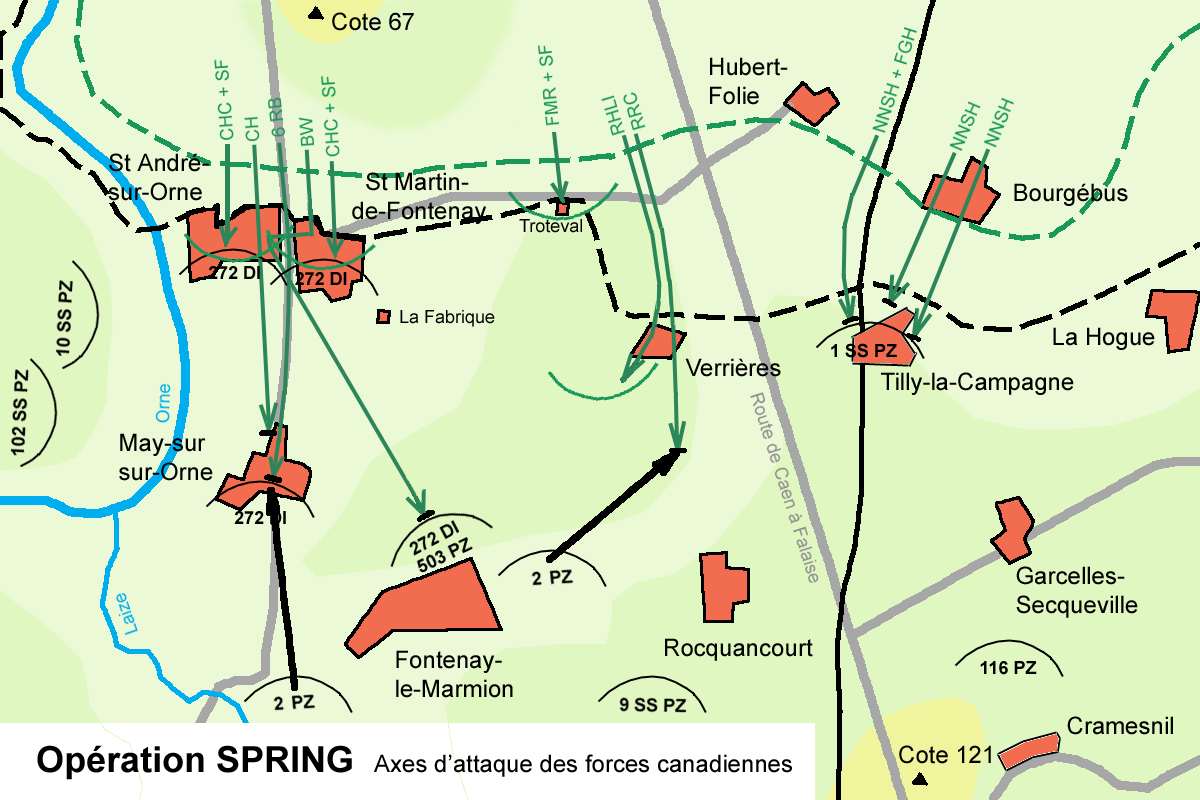
Fort Garry Horse

The museum preserves the history of the regiment through the collection of documents, pictures, books, military artefacts, etc., pertaining to the Regiment. The museum preserves the history of Cavalry in Manitoba through the collection of documents, pictures, books, military artefacts, etc. It provides a training facility for the teaching of Regimental history. The museum's goal is to stimulate and foster within the general public an ongoing interest in the Regiment and its activities and accomplishments.

== Affiliations ==
The Museum is affiliated with: CMA, CHIN, AMM, and Virtual Museum of Canada.

== See also ==
- Organization of Military Museums of Canada
