= Microfilm reader =

Device used to project and magnify images in microform

A microfilm reader or microreader is a device that uses a lens and source of light to magnify miniaturized text and accompanying images that have been printed on a roll of 16 mm film (100 cm or 215 cm in length) or 35 mm film (100 cm in length), which is also known as microfilm or "roll film."

Throughout the 20th century, many commercial organizations and government agencies used microfilm as the main medium to store large amounts of text from books, periodicals, and records until the advent of modern computers, which offered instant access to content and additional storage and cost-savings advantages over microfilm. The need and production of complementary microfilm readers therefore fell with the need for microfilm, but they are still used today to view stored content on microfilm that has yet to be converted into a digital format.

== History ==
=== 19th century ===
The development of the microfilm reader began when John Benjamin Dancer produced one of the first recorded microphotographs in 1839. Dancer, an English optical instrument maker, was experimenting with the newly announced Daguerreotype photography process when he placed a microscope lens in a camera, then produced a photograph with a 160:1 reduction ratio. Dancer continued experimenting with microphotography over the next decade, but it was not until 1853 that he captured text onto a microphotograph for the first time: 680 letters inscribed on a monument tablet, which he mounted onto 3 × 1 inch slides that could be read with his 100× microscopes, which became the first predecessor of the microfilm reader.

During this period, many other inventors and practitioners in Europe experimented with capturing and producing photographs of text at reduced dimensions, such as Alfred Rosling's photograph of a page from the Illustrated London News, creating a new novelty industry. The Daguerreotype process, which produced photographs on a copper plate, was the dominant form of photography until the 1850s, when it was replaced by Henry Fox Talbot's "calotype" process that produced a negative image onto paper, which was in turn eventually replaced by George Eastman's nitrocellulose film towards the end of the century.

In the winter of 1870–71, during Prussia's siege of Paris, the French businessman and photographer René Dagron traveled to French-held territories behind enemy lines, where he was contracted to copy documents and personal messages from French officials onto microphotographs, which he dispatched to Paris using carrier pigeons; and if the messages were received, the microphotographs were projected by a "magic lantern", another early form of the microfilm reader. The magic lantern is a type of projector that has been around since at least the 17th century, using candles, then oil as the source of light, and was used primarily for entertainment.

=== 20th century ===
Throughout the first two decades of the twentieth century, roll film went through much development and improvement by making cellulose less flammable. Cameras became more affordable for consumers, such as the $1 Kodak BROWNIE Camera, which contributed to the growth of the motion picture industry. Despite the widespread use of film in the beginning of the century, it still was not used as a form of storage in a commercial setting until 1925, when New York banker George McCarthy invented the Checkograph. Designed as a way for banks to detect fraud and store records permanently, the Checkograph snapped photographs of several checks simultaneously then printed the micro images onto Kodak 16 mm film, which was viewed with a handheld magnifier or a Kodak projector such as the Kodascope, a new form of the microfilm reader.

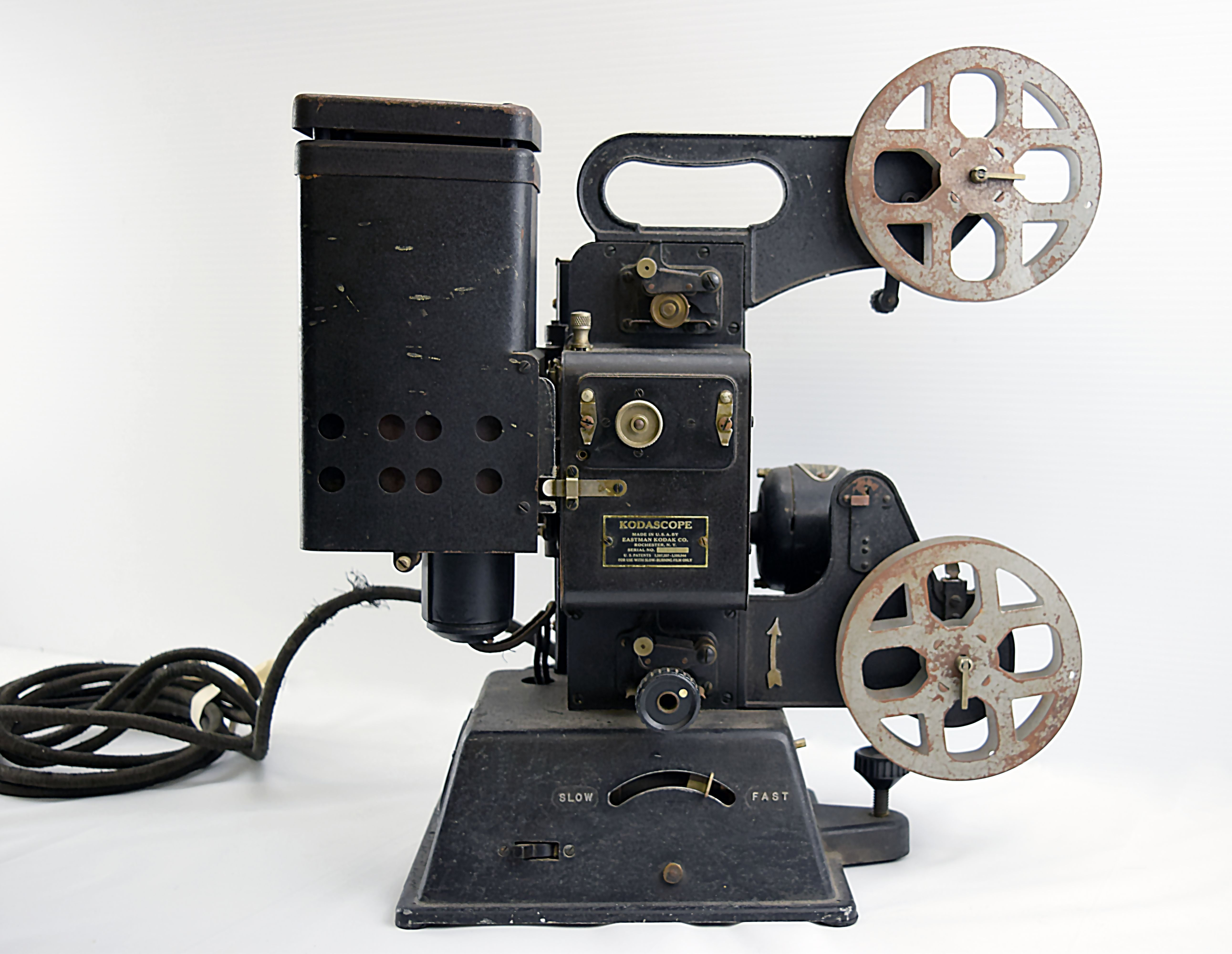
16 mm Kodak roll film projector. Kodascope Model A (1924).

Books were also being transformed and converted to microfilm during this time, and unique readers were developed for this trend. In 1920, retired Navy Admiral Bradley Allen Fiske filed his first patent for a handheld reading machine that could magnify the microprint of manuscripts and books. Filing eleven patents from 1920-1935, Admiral Fiske's earlier designs resembled a two-eyepiece lorgnette but were later built with a single-eye viewing scope. All of his designs included a roller that shifted the eyepiece along the reading material, which at first were printed on long sheets of paper, then later film. While Admiral Fiske's reading machine, the "Fiskeoscope," never became a commercial success, it did influence the designs of handheld film readers that were produced decades later.

Admiral Fiske's "Fiskeoscope." Image from Scientific American, June 1922. Public domain in the United States.

In 1930, the writer and impresario Robert Carlton Brown published an essay titled "The Readies" in the international journal transition, proposing an electric, portable reading machine that used a 4-5 inch magnifying glass to view microfilms of books. However, he adjusted the medium in his 1931 book, "Readies for Bob Brown's Machine," when he stated that books would be printed "on a ribbon of tough impressionable material," implying ticker tape, and that words would move in a single stream across the screen as opposed to viewing paragraphs or pages at one time, the speed of which could be controlled by the user with the press of a button. A prototype was built and featured in his book, but Brown was never able to acquire the capital to put his prototype into production.

In 1949, Wesleyan University Librarian Fremont Rider produced the first microcard, which used a process that printed miniaturized pages from microfilm onto an opaque, 3" x 5" photographic paper that could hold approximately 15-100 pages on each side. Microcards were designed to be used with a standard 3" x 5" card catalogue system, saving space for libraries and repositories by combining records and content of published works. Microcard readers were more difficult to develop than film readers since light had to be reflected back from opaque paper as opposed to being transmitted through a transparent medium, but a small and large-sized portable reader were released the following year.

These readers were eventually embedded into microfilm readers, first with an external adapter that was developed by the Manchester College of Science and Technology in 1957, then built into film readers in the mid-1960s. During this decade, NASA began using microfiche (sheets of film with a standard size of 105 mm × 148 mm), to distribute and store technical reports, then the Department of Defense and Atomic Energy Commission soon followed, which marked the precedence of major organizations using film as the primary storage method and ending the demand for microcards.

During this same period, the photocopying process used in commercially popular photocopiers was adjusted so that microfilm readers could copy and print images from microfilm, which came to be called the "reader-printer." The first prototype of a reader-printer was showcased by the Minnesota Mining & Manufacturing Company, also known as 3M, in 1957, then the organization produced the Model 23 Reader-Printer the following year.

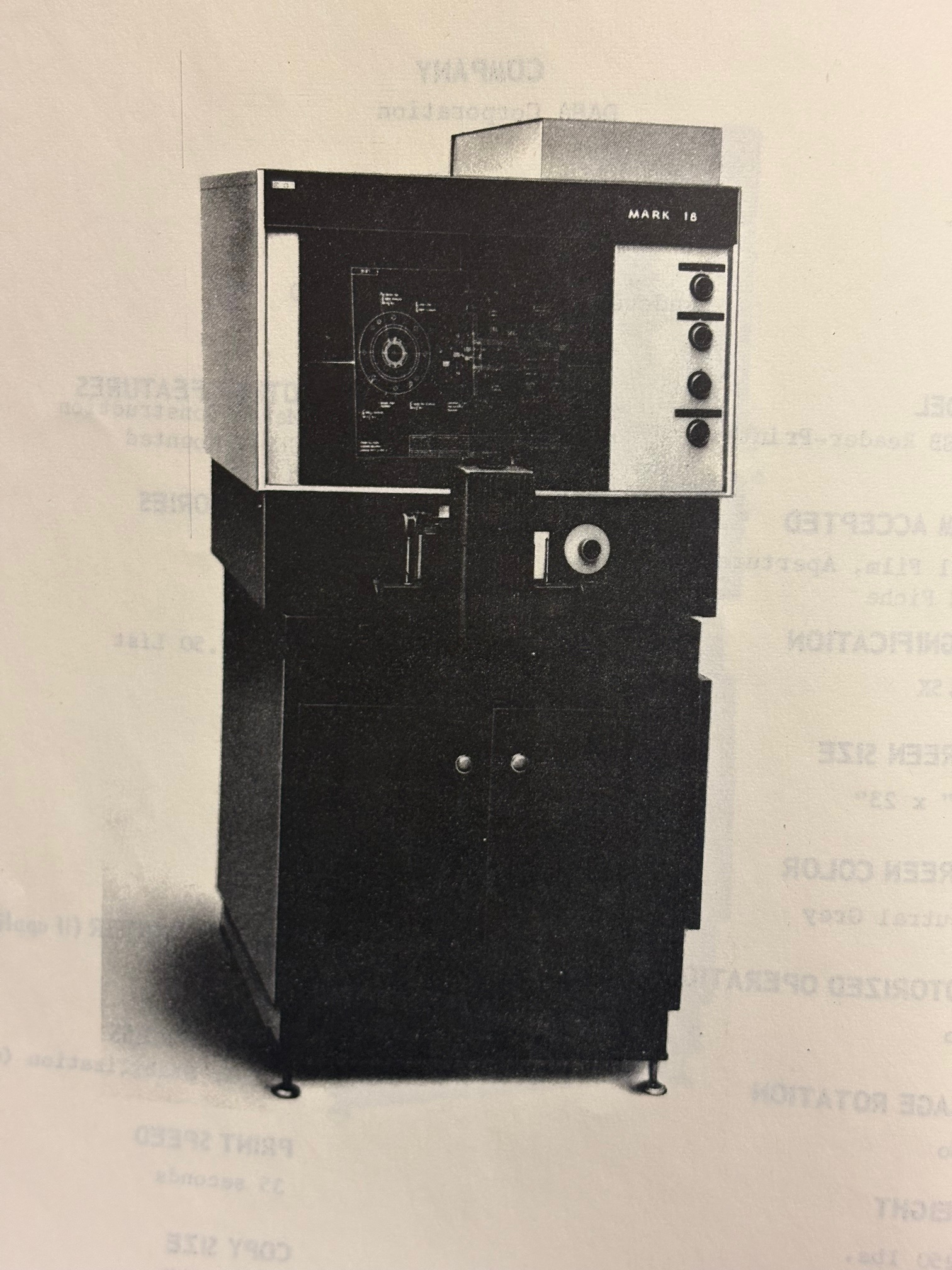
DASA Corporation Mark 18 Reader-Printer (Roll Film, Aperture Cards, and Microfilm Fiche) (1971).

Microfilm was used in a new way when data from computer tape was printed onto roll film instead of paper, a process known as computer output microfilming (COM). First developed by the military in the 1940s, COM became widespread in the 1960s and led to the development of reader-printers, enlarger-printers, retrieval units. On the consumer side, readers became smaller and could be transported in a suitcase, sit on the lap, or held in the hand. Throughout the 1970s, many international producers entered the US reader market, offering higher quality and more affordable products, that by the end of the decade, Japanese manufacturers became dominant participants in the market.

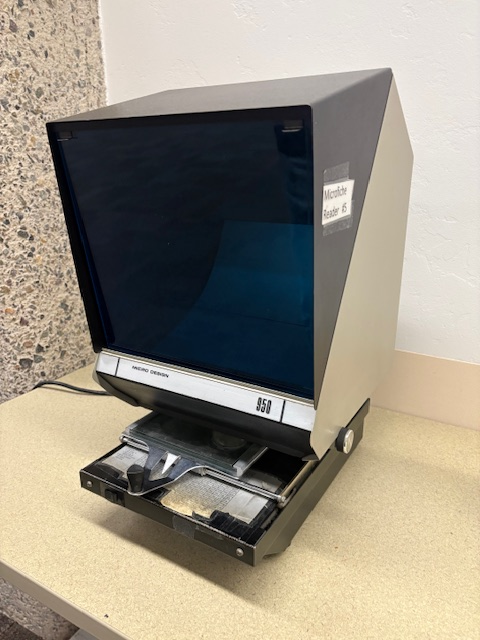
MICRO DESIGN 950 microfiche reader (1975). Photograph taken at the University of Arizona - Main Library (2025).

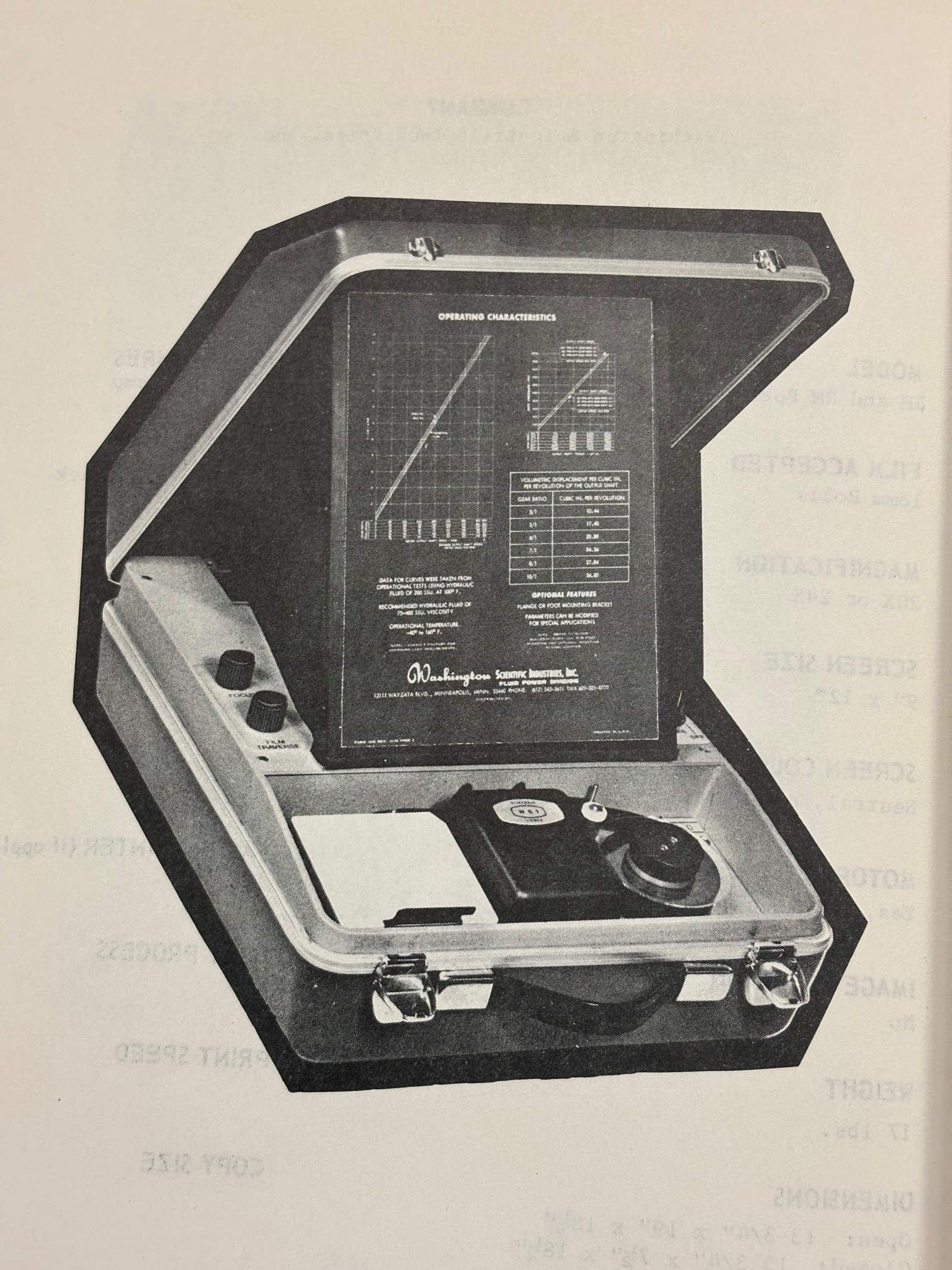
Portable Model C Cartridge Reader by Washington Scientific Industries, Inc. (1971).

=== 21st century ===
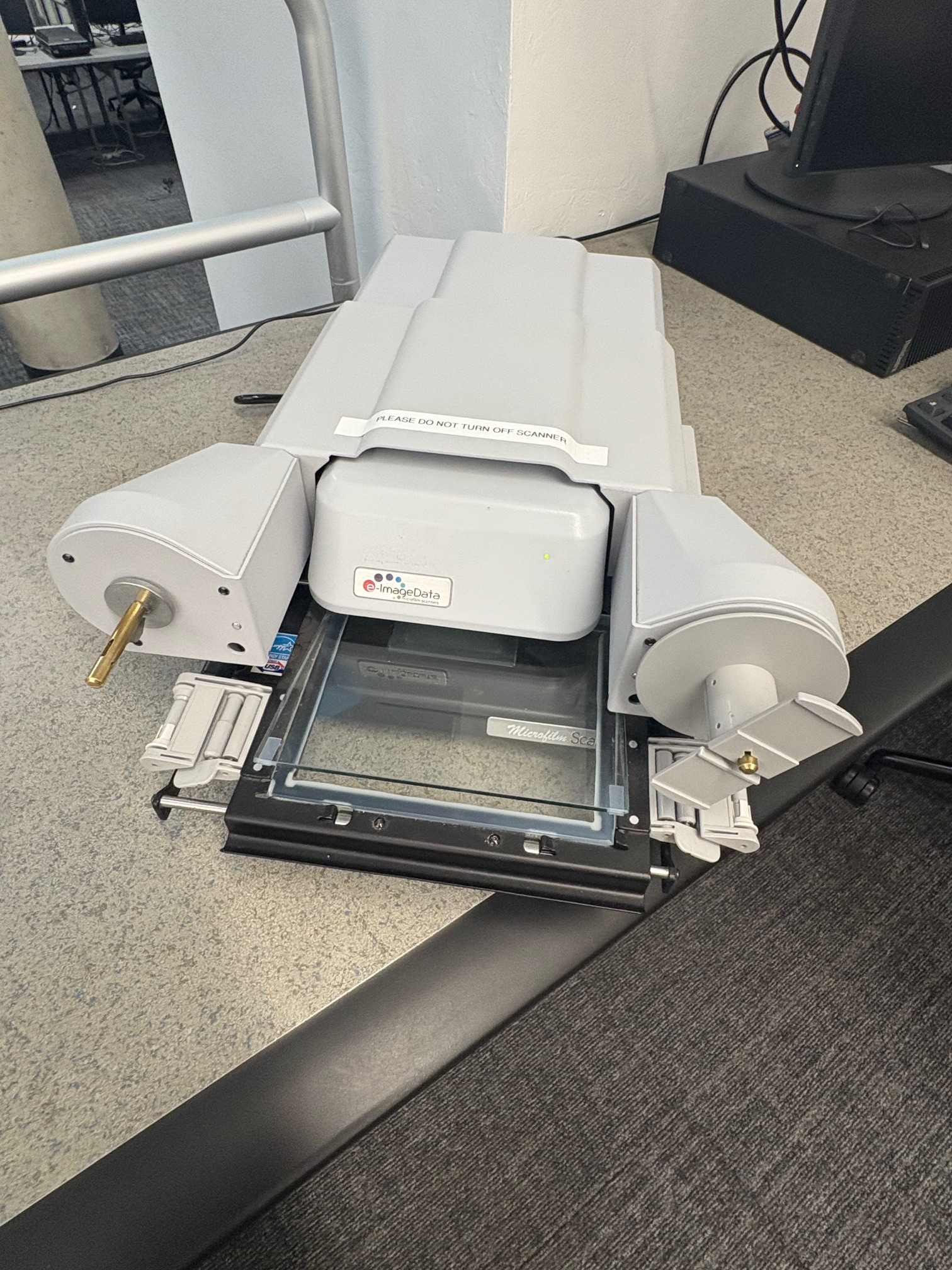
ScanPro 2200 Microfilm & Fiche Reader by e-ImageData Corp, connected to a Windows PC. Photograph taken at the University of Arizona - Main Library (2025).

Personal computers were introduced to consumers in the late 1970s, and over time replaced COM as the primary way to store and view data, and have become the primary way to view microfilm today, although the lens of a reader is still needed to magnify the content of roll film. Hardware and software has allowed microfilm readers to be compatible with Windows operating systems, but they must be redesigned when there are significant revisions to hardware and/or the operating system, such as in 2023 when the Firewire serial bus was replaced by USB 3.1 technology, and when Windows 10 was replaced by Windows 11.

== Gallery ==
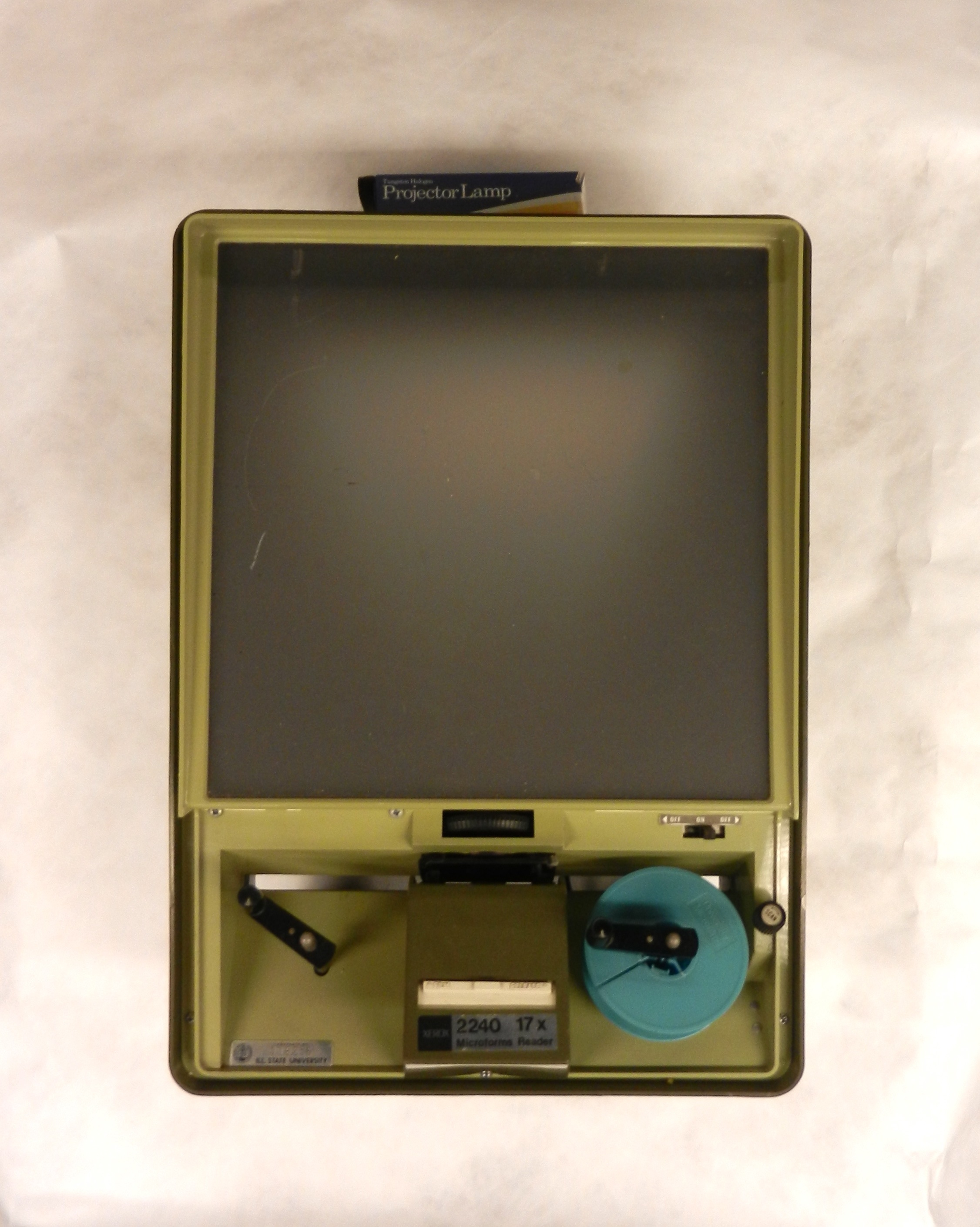

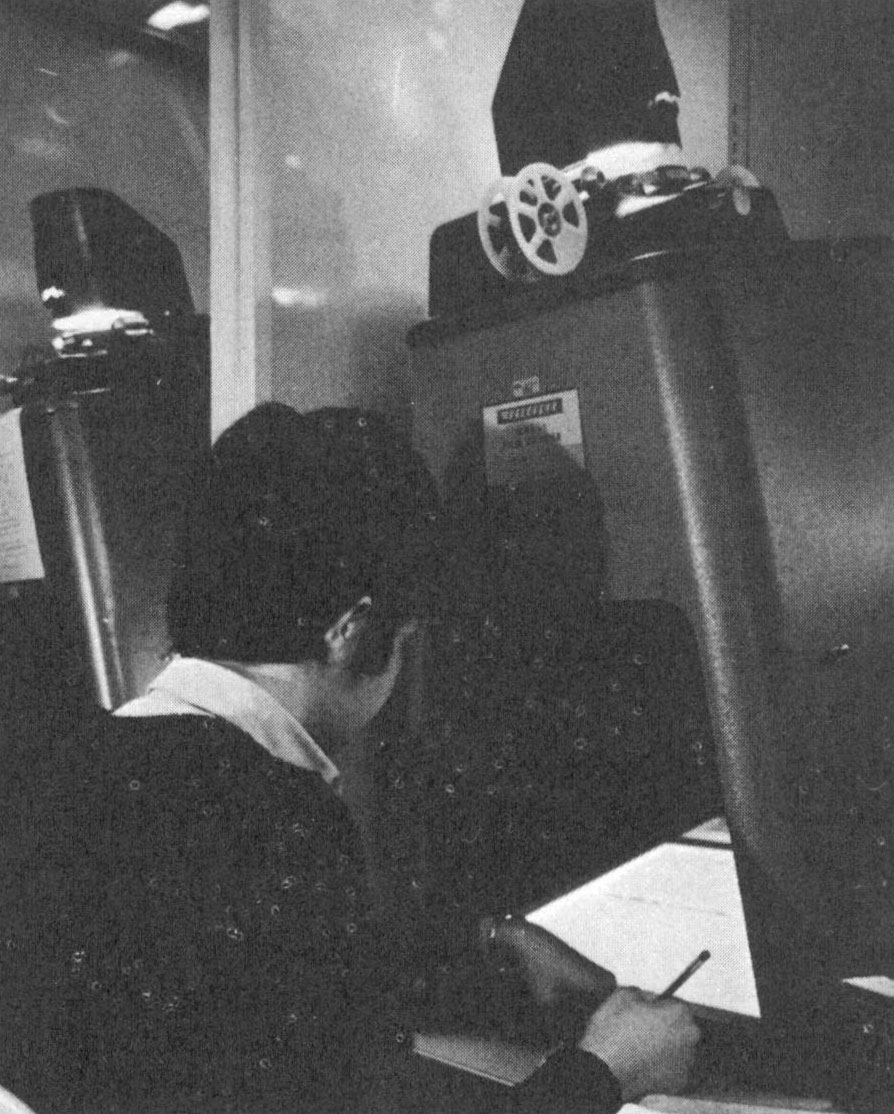
1968

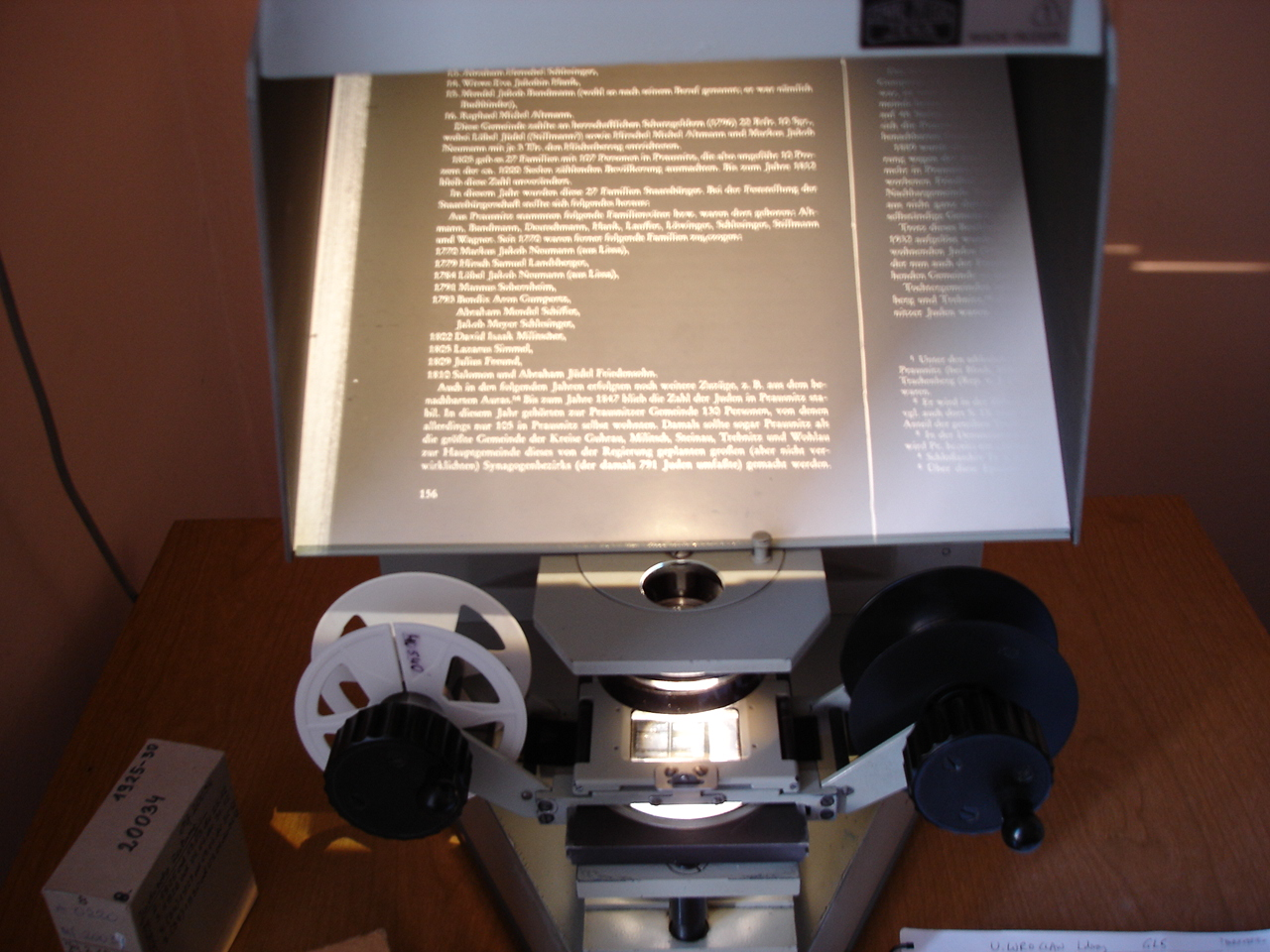
2004

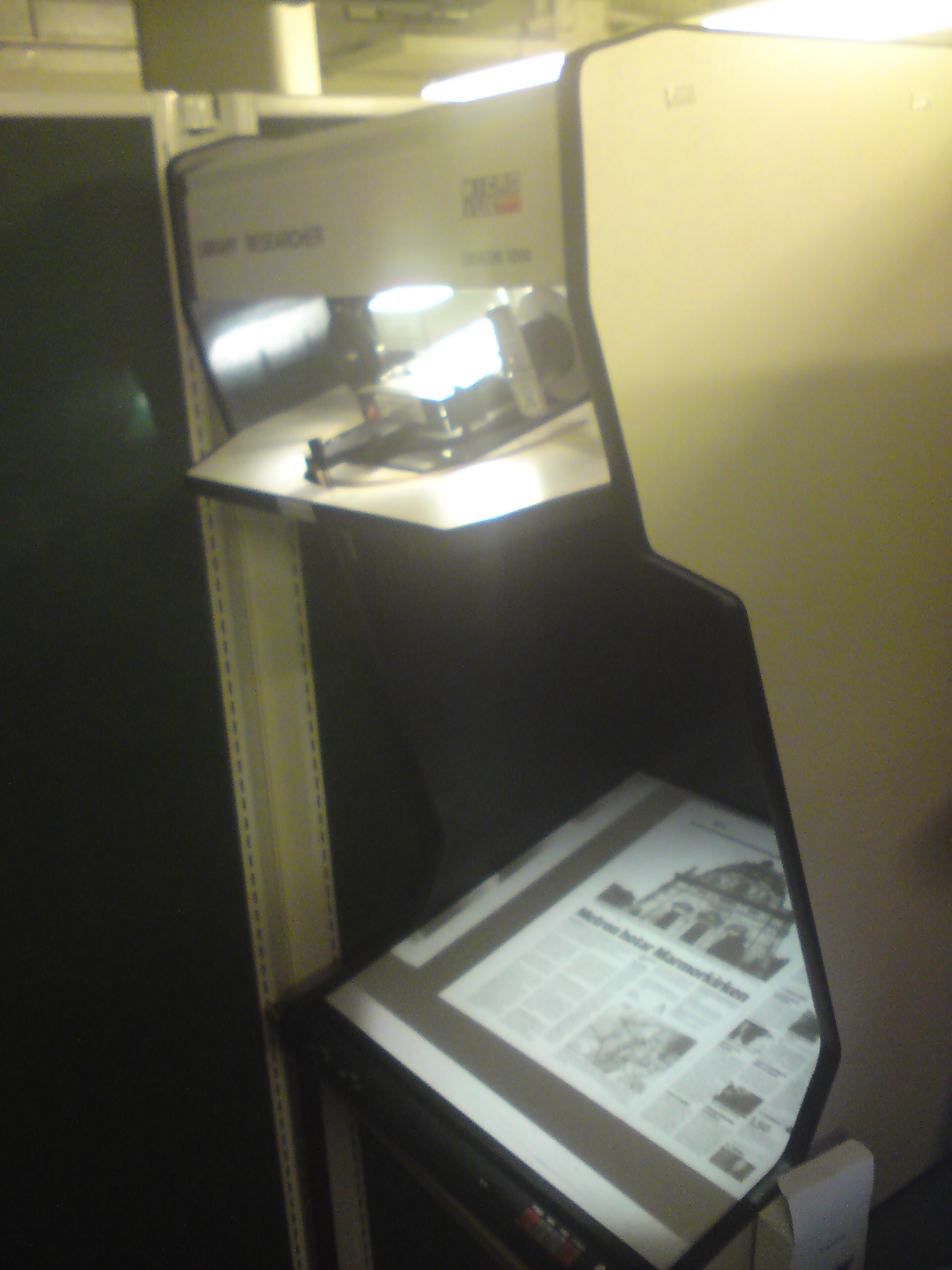
2009

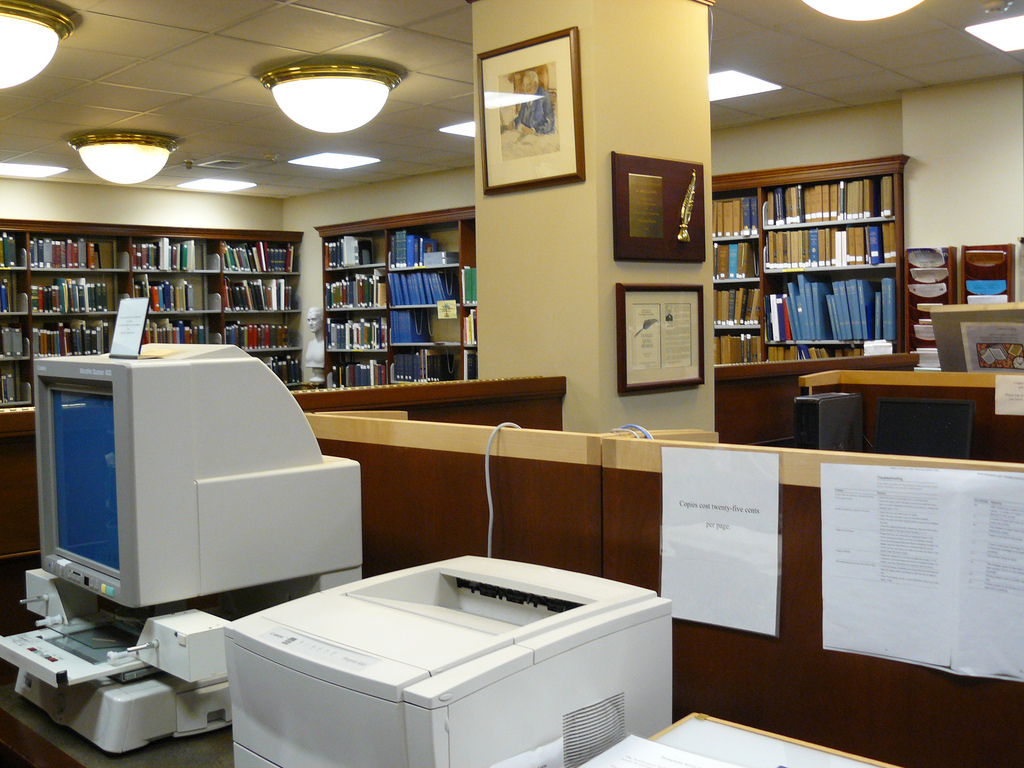
2011
