= Hudson's Bay Company Department Store =

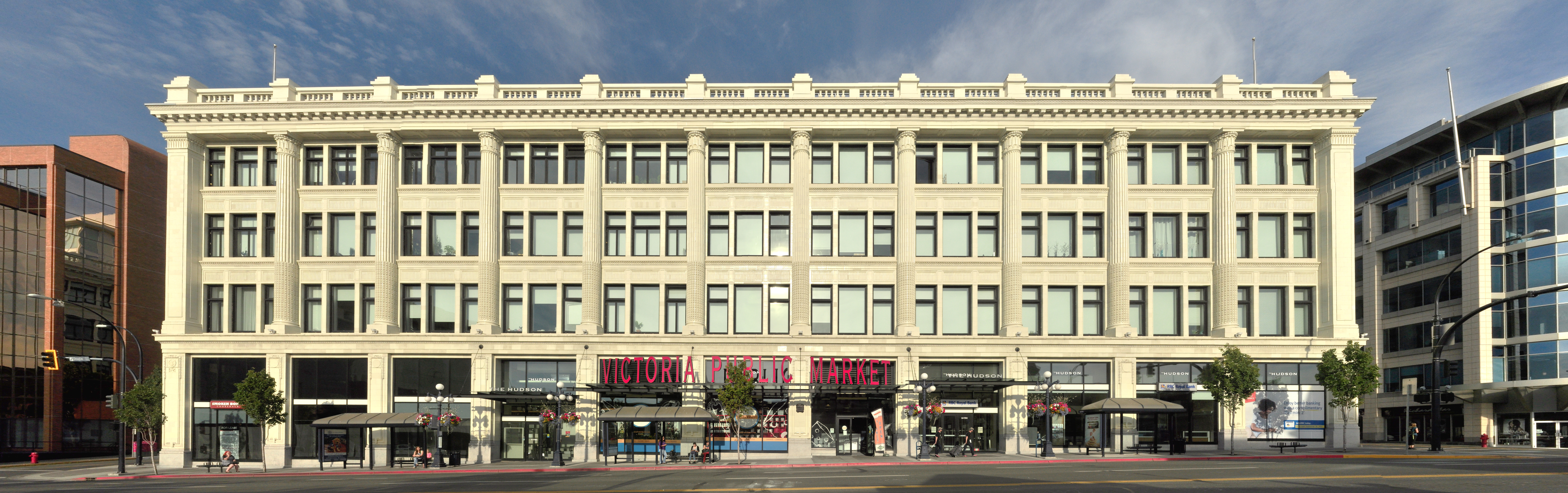
- The building's exterior in 2015
- Interactive map of the Hudson's Bay Company Department Store area

General information
- Location: 1701 Douglas Street, Victoria, British Columbia, Canada
- Coordinates: 48.4299°N 123.3639°W

The Hudson's Bay Company Department Store is an historic building in Victoria, British Columbia, Canada. It is currently being used as a public market space.

== See also ==
- List of historic places in Victoria, British Columbia
