= Little Harbour West =

Ghost town in Newfoundland and Labrador

- Vacated Settlement
- Interactive map of Little Harbour West
- Coordinates: 47°23′0″N 54°47′57″W
- Country: Canada
- Province: Newfoundland and Labrador
- Time zone: UTC−3:30 (Newfoundland Time)
  - Summer (DST): UTC−2:30 (Newfoundland Daylight Time)
- Area code: 709

Little Harbour West is an abandoned settlement in Newfoundland and Labrador.

== History ==
Little Harbour West was one of several communities in Placentia Bay that were resettled during the 1960s. The settlement had a recorded population of 10 in the 1845 census and grew steadily, reaching approximately 130 residents by the mid-1930s. A church and school were established in the community during the late nineteenth century, and lobster processing became an important local industry in the early twentieth century. The community's gradual decline has been attributed in part to the limitations of its harbour, which was less suitable for the larger fishing vessels increasingly used as fishing activities expanded farther from shore. Little Harbour West was abandoned in 1966 as residents relocated to larger centres in the region.
