= Public Archives and Records Office =

Coordinates: 46.234498°N 63.125766°W

The Public Archives and Records Office is the official government archive of the Canadian province of Prince Edward Island. It is located at 175 Richmond Street in Charlottetown.

It includes resources for genealogy and archival collections. As of 2018, it is administratively part of the Department of Education, Early Learning and Culture.
