= Provincial Archives of Saskatchewan =

The Provincial Archives of Saskatchewan (formerly the Saskatchewan Archives Board) is an arm's-length government agency with offices in Regina, Saskatchewan, Canada. The archives holds public and private records which include audio tapes, video, photographs, maps, publications and other material.

== History ==
A.S. Morton, a history professor at the University of Saskatchewan in Saskatoon was a leading figure in heritage preservation in Saskatchewan. He became head of the department of history at the university as well as university librarian in 1914, just prior to the outbreak of World War I. During the war, he travelled throughout Saskatchewan, teaching university extension classes to rural communities. It was during these travels that he became aware of the urgent need to acquire and preserve Saskatchewan's documentary heritage.

Efforts were made by a number of professors at the University of Saskatchewan to develop an archival program. Government inaction and limited support stymied most of the efforts. During World War I, a provision was made for an archives branch of the Legislative Library, but the position of archivist was allowed to lapse after the death of Assistant Librarian and archivist William Trant in 1924. Meanwhile, the Legislature was overflowing with inactive government records. The solution to the overflow was to feed the records to the fires of the powerhouse nearby. The first statute to deal with the retention or disposal of archival records, the Preservation of Public Documents Act of 1920, did little to transfer documents of historic significance to the archives.

The Historical Public Records Office (HPRO) set up at the University of Saskatchewan in 1937 was the precursor to the present day Provincial Archives of Saskatchewan. Morton modelled the HPRO on the English Public Record Office. He felt it was important to make a distinction between government archives and archives containing general historic material. He was solely concerned with the preservation of government records in the early years. He spent the next seven years pursuing inactive federal government records and records of farm organizations with the aim of developing a leading research facility for prairie history. He pushed for an archives Act to create a public records policy for the province.

In March 1945, the Archives Act was passed and the Saskatchewan Archives Board was formed. Morton was not alive to see the passing of the act – he had died in January 1945. The Archives Act formalized the relationship between the University of Saskatchewan and the provincial government. A board of five was created, two members appointed by the Lieutenant Governor, two by the Board of Governors of the university. The fifth member was to be the Legislative librarian, while the Provincial Archivist sat as Secretary of the Board.

In 2004, a revised Archives Act was passed, updating the legislative framework and ensuring Saskatchewan's legislation is in line with that of other Canadian provinces.

On 24 August 2015, The Archives and Public Records Management Act was passed. As part of this act, the name of the institution was changed to the Provincial Archives of Saskatchewan .

== About the Archives ==
The Provincial Archives of Saskatchewan holds government records, private records, business records, maps, audio tapes, photographs, moving images, architectural drawings, newspapers, and microfilm. Some archival records date back to the mid 19th century. The archival holdings document the lives of all residents of Saskatchewan – from the political, social and economic elite to the ordinary citizen.

The archives offers reference services to individuals wishing to use the archives in person or from a distance. While genealogists comprise nearly half of the users of the archives, students, professors, historians, lawyers, journalists, artists and government organizations also utilize the facilities.

== See also ==
- List of provincial historic sites of Saskatchewan
- History of Saskatchewan
