= Provincial Archives of Alberta =

Official archives of Alberta, Canada

The Provincial Archives of Alberta

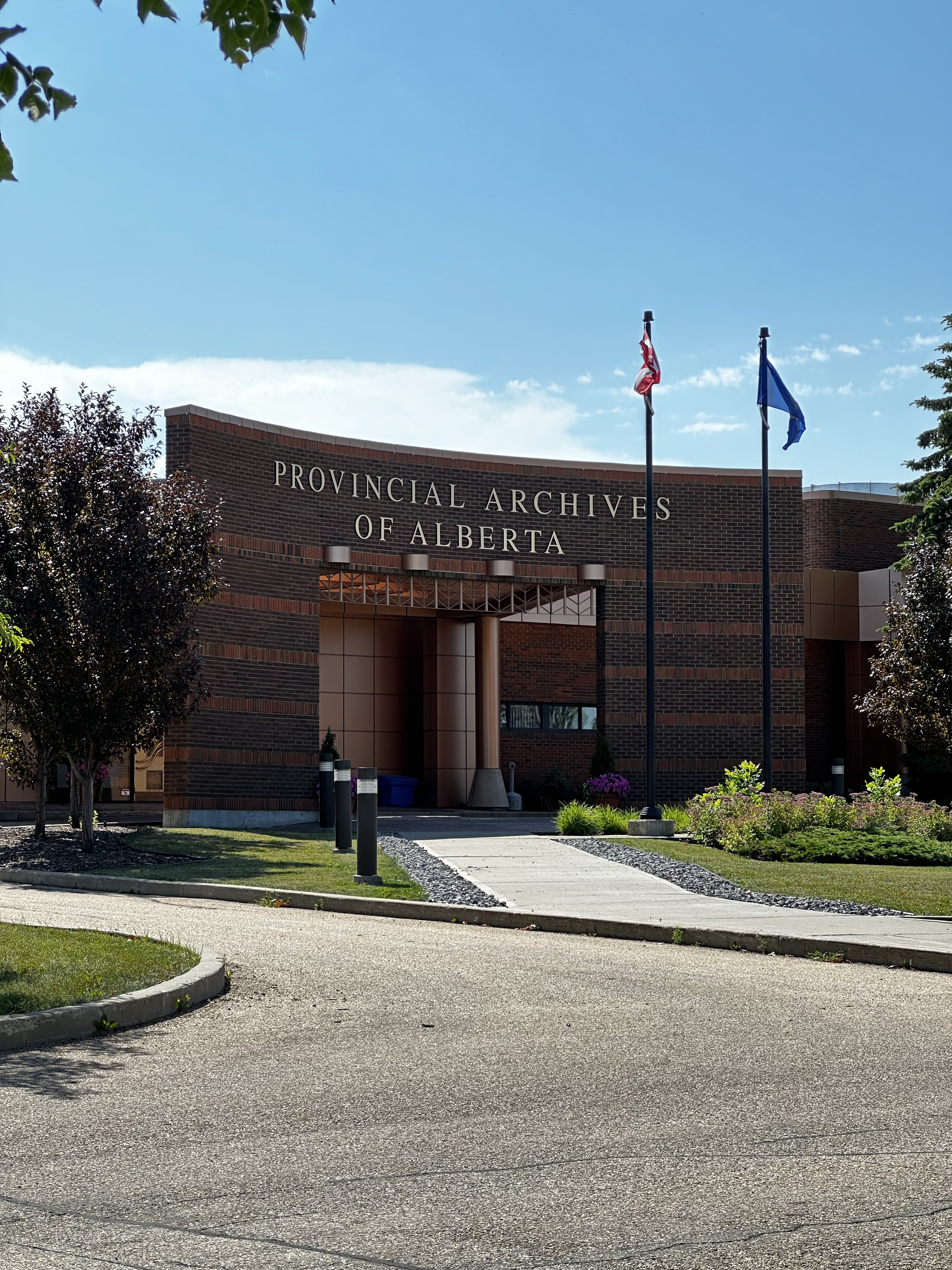
- Established: 1962
- Location: 8555 Roper Rd NW, Edmonton, AB T6E 5W1
- Coordinates: 53.487409°N 113.451929°W
- Type: Archives
- Collection size: 2 million
- Executive director: Leslie Latta
- Website: provincialarchives.alberta.ca

The Provincial Archives of Alberta is the official archives of the Canadian province of Alberta. It preserves and makes available for research both private and government records of all media related to Alberta. The Provincial Archives of Alberta also serves as the permanent archival repository of the Government of Alberta. The organization is situated in the Ministry of Arts, Culture and Status of Women.

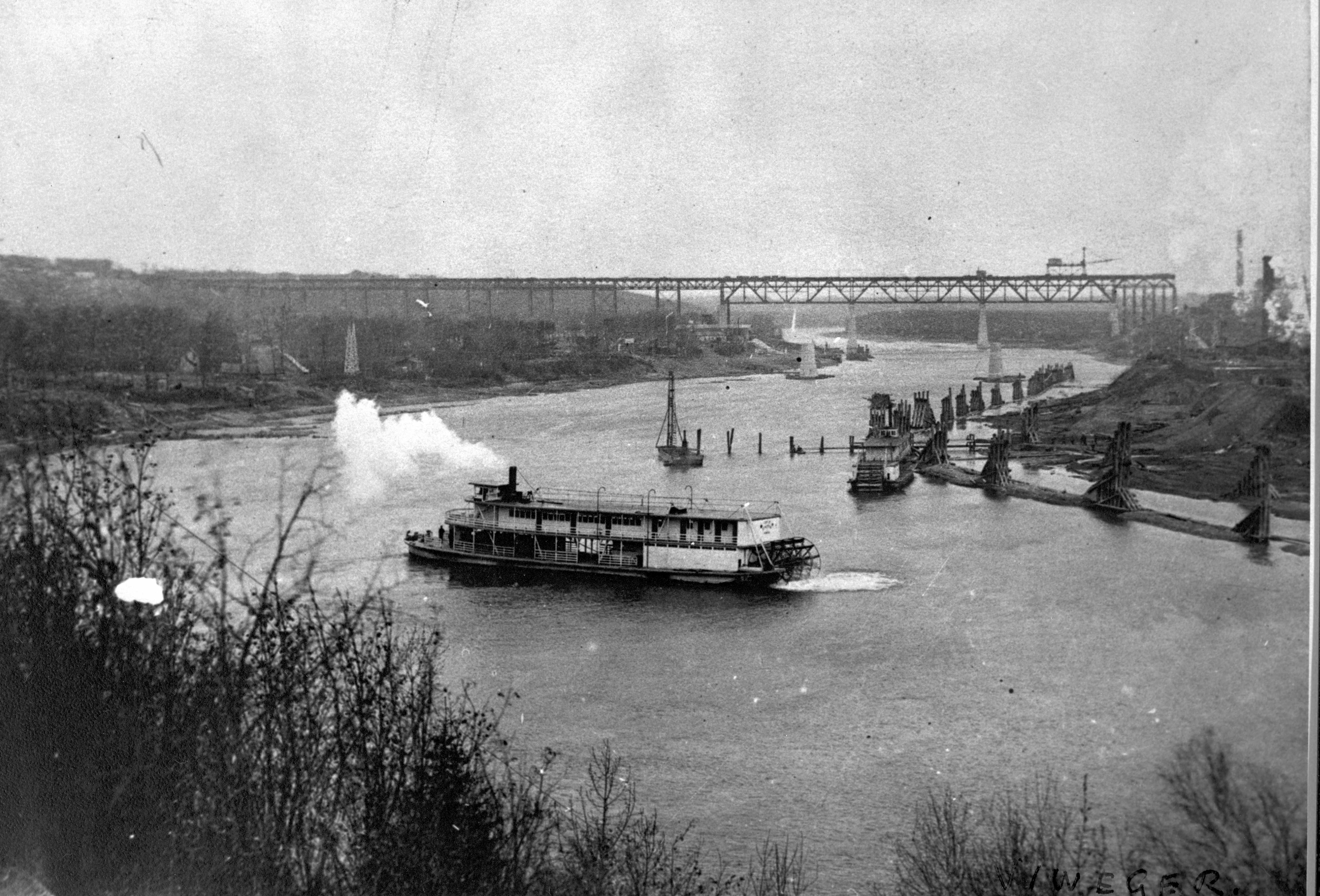
The North Saskatchewan River at Edmonton, taken sometime in 1913. High Level Bridge under construction in the background.

== History ==
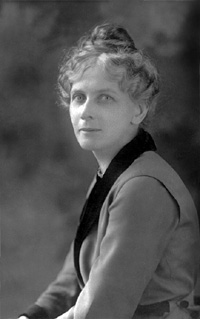
Katharine Hughes, First Provincial Archivist. Ca 1906, Provincial Archives of Alberta Photo A539.

The Provincial Archives of Alberta dates back to 1906, when the Provincial Library was established. The Library collected, published archival material. There is evidence that Katherine Hughes served as the first Provincial Archivist within the Provincial Library as early as 1908.

Plans to celebrate Canada’s 100th birthday in 1967 had been percolating since 1959, when the federal government announced that grants would be available to each province to mark the occasion. The Alberta government chose to celebrate the country’s centennial year by building a provincial archives to house and make available public documents relating to the history of the province, as well as a provincial museum.

In 1962, the Government established a Museums Branch under the Department of the Provincial Secretary to guide the establishment of the Provincial Museum and Archives. The Branch began to accept records from government and private sources in 1963, and a year later in 1964, major acquisitions - such as the Harry Pollard photographic collection - were made by the newly established Archives.

In 1966, construction on Phase II of the new building took place. That same year, the first Provincial Archives Act was passed, under which the Public Documents Committee was established. Recruitment of technical and professional staff for the Provincial Archives also began in earnest.

The Provincial Museum and Archives officially opened their new building in Glenora, constructed under the Confederation Memorial Grants program, on December 6, 1967. More technical, professional and administrative staff members were added during the year and acquisitions continued to grow.

In the 1990s, it became clear the Provincial Archives had outgrown its space when it started warehousing collections offsite. The need for a new building became apparent. In October 2003, the Archives officially opened the doors to its new location, an impressive 11,000 square metre building situated on a six hectare (14.8 acre) site in southeast Edmonton on Roper Road. Funding for the construction of the new building was made possible through grants from the Alberta Centennial Legacy Project Program.

== Collection ==
The collection includes:

- 62,807 metres (206,060 ft) of government textual records
- 6,486 metres (21,280 ft) of private textual records
- 161,497 maps, plans, and architectural drawings
- 2,313,412 photographs
- 90,588 objects of audiovisual holdings including film, video and audio recordings
- 18,170 volumes of library holdings

== Reference services ==
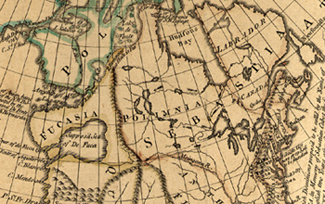
Portion of the map British Dominions by William Doyle and J. Prockter, 1770, Provincial Archives of Alberta Accession 71.430/4

Public interaction with the Provincial Archives of Alberta is primarily through the Sandra Thomson Reading Room, which is open to the public four days a week and staffed full-time by professional archivists. The archivists are available to give advice on the primary sources that may respond to researchers' inquiries.

The Sandra Thomson Reading Room has the following major sources:

- Alberta homestead records;
- newspapers;
- city directories;
- Vital Statistics records;
- local history books;
- census records;
- passenger lists;
- Alberta divorce and probate records;
- Alberta court records;
- United Church of Canada records;
- Missionary Oblates of Mary Immaculate records;
- Anglican Church of Canada records; and
- Evangelical Lutheran Church in Canada records.

The Provincial Archives of Alberta promotes Alberta's history and in this way makes the Archives relevant to future users through:

- special events and exhibits that highlight the holdings;
- website – holdings online and to promote services; and,
- various communication strategies that build awareness of the resources available in the Provincial Archives holdings.
