= Irving Guttman =

Canadian stage director (1928–2014)

Irving Guttman (October 27, 1928, in Chatham, Ontario – December 7, 2014, in Vancouver) was a Canadian stage director who had a profound impact on the field of opera within his own country. Described by The Canadian Encyclopedia as "the father of opera in Western Canada", he co-founded the Edmonton Opera, the Regina Opera Company and the Manitoba Opera; the latter of which he served as artistic director from 1977–1998.

Guttman was a shrewd judge of talent and helped nurture the careers of several young Canadian singers, including Tracy Dahl, Maureen Forrester, Judith Forst, and Ben Heppner. He also was able to draw several highly acclaimed artists to Canada for their initial appearances; first attracting international attention in 1963 when he mounted a production of Vincenzo Bellini's Norma at the Vancouver Opera starring Joan Sutherland and Marilyn Horne. Other artists whose Canadian debuts he orchestrated included José Carreras, Plácido Domingo, Samuel Ramey, and Beverly Sills.

A graduate of the Strathcona Academy in Montréal (1941–1946) and The Royal Conservatory of Music in Toronto (1947–1952), Guttman was awarded Honorary Doctor of Letters from the University of Winnipeg (1995) and the University of British Columbia (2009). His other awards and honors include the Canadian Centennial Medal (1967), being made a Member of the Order of Canada (1988), the 125th Anniversary of the Confederation of Canada Medal (1992), the "Rubie" Opera Builder Award from Opera Canada (2001), the Queen Elizabeth II Golden Jubilee Medal (2002), and being made a Member of the Order of British Columbia (2002). He has also been inducted into the Edmonton Cultural Hall of Fame (1988), the Vancouver Hall of Fame (1994), the BC Entertainment Hall of Fame (1994), and the Canadian Opera Hall of Fame (1995).
