= Manitoba Centennial Centre =

Arts centre in Winnipeg, Canada

Manitoba Centennial Centre Corporation
- Headquarters: 555 Main Street, Winnipeg, MB,
- Number of locations: 7 venues
- Key people: Karl Loepp (chair)
- Parent: Manitoba Crown Services
- Website: https://www.mbccc.ca/

Manitoba Centennial Centre is an arts and cultural district that covers a 34-acre area in the east Exchange District of the Point Douglas area in Winnipeg, Manitoba, linking several of Manitoba's important arts and cultural facilities.

It includes the Centennial Concert Hall (and its accompanying underground parkade), the Manitoba Museum, Planetarium and Science Gallery, the Royal Manitoba Theatre Centre (including Tom Hendry Warehouse Theatre and John Hirsch Mainstage), Manitoba Production Centre, Artspace (the Gault building), three nearby surface parking lots, and the building at 11 Lily Street. Founded as an urban renewal program in 1960, the Centre now sees 930,000 patrons annually at its venues. The Manitoba Centennial Centre Corporation (MBCCC)—a Manitoba Crown corporation established in 2005—manages the centre.

== History ==
Prior to the centre's opening, cultural events and displays in Winnipeg were held at the Winnipeg Auditorium (now the Manitoba Archives).

The Manitoba Centennial Corporation was established by Premier Duff Roblin, who, along with Minister Maitland B. Steinkopf, formed the concept of a Centennial Centre in 1960 to commemorate the centenary of Canada (1867) and of Manitoba (1870) as well as initiate a broad scheme of urban renewal in Winnipeg's Point Douglas area.

In November 1964, plans were revealed for the development of the C$13.5 million Centennial Arts Centre. In July 1965, a display model put inside Eaton's Place was revealed to the media and public, showing what is now the Centennial Concert Hall, Manitoba Museum and Planetarium, and the Manitoba Theatre Centre. At the outset, the proposed development would have seen the demolition of the Confederation Life heritage building. Several high-rise apartment buildings surround the site, as well as a park behind the Concert Hall. The original model is currently displayed in the basement of the Concert Hall.

It was estimated that the cost of the Concert Hall alone would be $5 million. The Government of Manitoba had saved up C$6.8 million for the project, of which $2.5 million came from its own funds, $2.5 million from the federal government, and C$1.8 from the City of Winnipeg. Moreover, all Manitoba municipalities were asked to donate 5 cents per citizen. In addition to government funding, a local fundraising campaign, called The Manitoba Centennial Citizens’ Campaign, was launched seeking private and corporate donations through various programs. It collected close to $7 million to contribute to the project.

As part of the Centennial Centre, Centennial Concert Hall opened first (March 1968) as 253,014 square-foot venue, at the cost of $8 million. Prominent Canadian artists were selected to capture the spirit of the Concert Hall, including artist Greta Dale, whose mural sits in the lobby, and artist Tony Tascona, whose two murals are featured on the orchestra level on both the left and right sides. New York's George C. Izenour was hired to consult for theatre design & engineering, and Bolt Beranek & Newman for acoustics.

The Concert Hall was followed by the Manitoba Planetarium (May 1968) and the Manitoba Museum (July 1970). In 1968, the Manitoba Theatre Centre (MTC) moved into the Centennial Concert Hall at 555 Main Street, where it spent the 1968/69 and 1969/70 seasons. The present site of MTC, at 174 Market Avenue, was opened on 31 October 1970, where its first production would be Bertolt Brecht’s A Man’s a Man, directed by founding Artistic Director John Hirsch.

The current Manitoba Centennial Centre Corporation operates under the Manitoba Centennial Centre Corporation Act, which was assented on 9 June 2005. The MBCCC is a Province of Manitoba Crown Corporation.

In September 2017, a report was released on substantially upgrading all the venues of the Centennial Centre.

== Venues ==
Centennial Concert Hall — The Centennial Concert Hall was opened on 25 March 1968. It seats 2,305 attendees and is home to the Winnipeg Symphony Orchestra, Royal Winnipeg Ballet, and the Manitoba Opera. In 2015, the lighting system was replaced by LED-based system by ArcSystem.

Manitoba Museum and Planetarium — The Manitoba Planetarium opened in 1968 as Winnipeg's first such planetarium. The Manitoba Museum opened in 1970 and currently features several galleries, including the HBC Gallery, the Winnipeg Gallery, and a Science Gallery.

Royal Manitoba Theatre Centre (RMTC) — The Royal Manitoba Theatre Centre, with a current seating capacity of 785, opened on 31 October 1970 and is Canada's oldest English-language regional theatre. Originally known as Manitoba Theatre Centre, the MTC was given a Royal designation by Queen Elizabeth II in 2010. The RMTC also operates two theatre venues in Winnipeg:

- John Hirsch Mainstage — total capacity: 789; orchestra: 531; balcony: 254; wheelchair spaces: 4.
- Tom Hendry Warehouse Theatre — The Tom Hendry Warehouse Theatre is RMTC's second stage. It was originally housed in the old Dominion Theatre, where it was simply known as the Studio Theatre. In 1965, with a new location, it was renamed Theatre-Across-The-Street. In 1969, a permanent facility was established at 140 Rupert Avenue, where it was known as the MTC Warehouse Theatre. At the 50th Anniversary Homecoming celebration on 11 May 2008, the Warehouse Theatre was officially dedicated to MTC co-founder and first general manager, Tom Hendry. (total capacity: 286; floor: 282; wheelchair spaces: 4).

=== Artspace ===
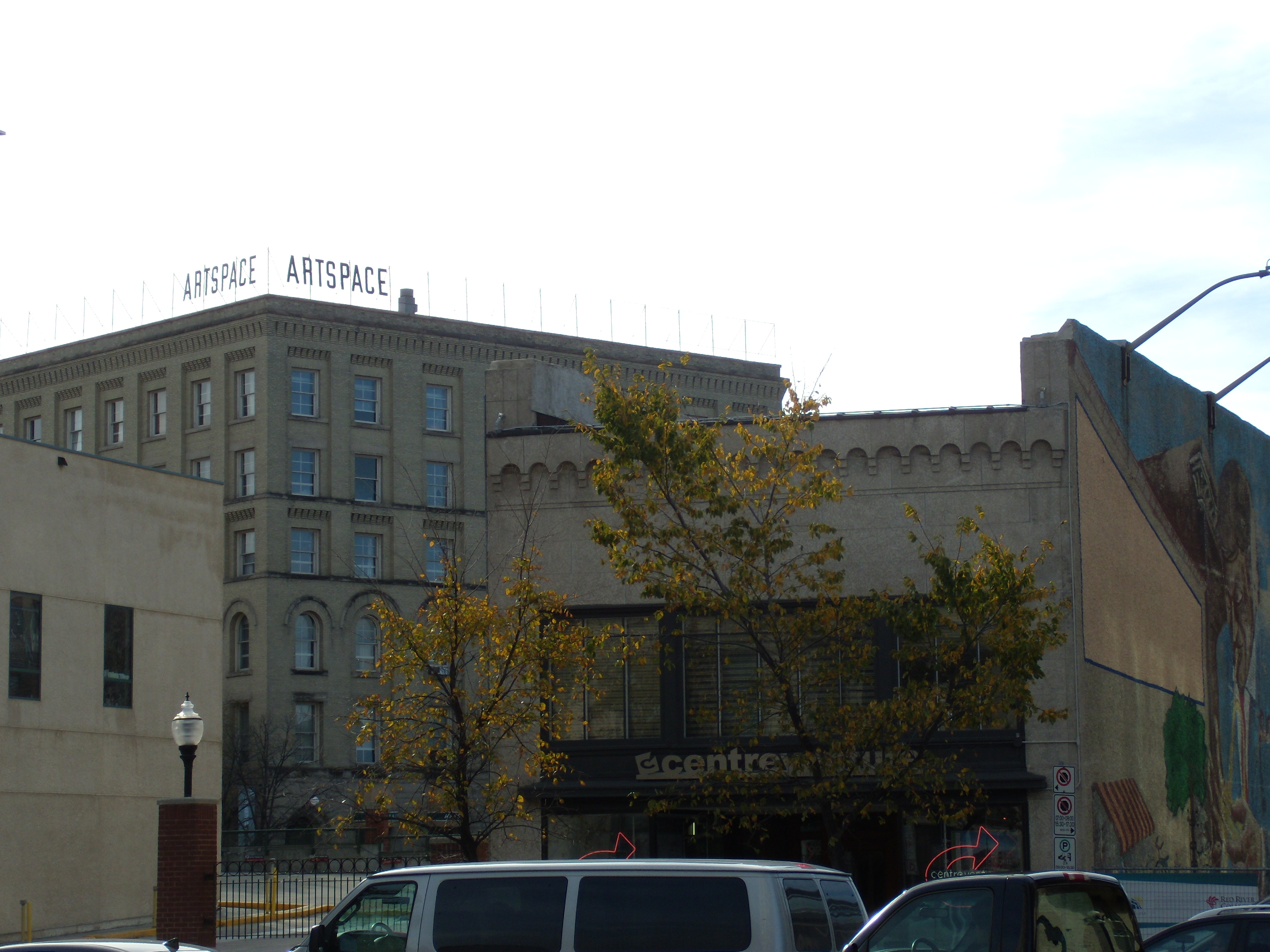
The Artspace building, sitting behind the CentreVenture building on Main Street, Winnipeg

In June 1984, the Core Area Initiative gave Artspace Inc. time to determine whether the former Gault Building in the Exchange District would be suitable for the various Winnipeg arts organizations. Artspace moved in 1986 to the old 50,000 ft^{2} (4,645 m^{2}) Gault Building as a cooperatively-run and government-funded creative arts organization at a cost of C$2.8 million to renovate the building.

This building provides artist studios, writing studios, two galleries, a film theatre, two darkrooms, editing bays, green screens, and sound studios, as well as housing nearly 2-dozen arts and cultural organizations working in film, video, book publishing, magazines, visual arts, theatre, music, and photography.

Nineteen arts organizations were housed when Artspace opened: Access and Main Gallery, Agassiz Productions, Canadian Book Information Centre, CARFAC Manitoba, Manitoba Association of Playwrights, Manitoba Composers Association, Manitoba Crafts Council, Manitoba Writers' Guild, Prairie Fire, Prairie Publishers Group, Video Pool, Visual Arts Manitoba Resource Centre, Winnipeg Film Group and Cinematheque, Winnipeg Periodicals Association, Winnipeg Photographers Group, Turnstone Press, Moosehead Press, and North Nassau Printmakers.

=== Manitoba Production Centre ===
The Manitoba Production Centre is Manitoba's only furnished sound stage. Located in Winnipeg's Exchange District, MPC offers a 1,400 m^{2} (15,000 ft^{2}) studio space used for film and television productions, along with a carpentry shop, offices with inclusive internet and phone system, 6 loading docks, make-up, wardrobe, dye room, 8 dressing rooms, and commissary.

=== Steinkopf Gardens ===
Running in-line with James Avenue, the Steinkopf Gardens lies in the middle of the Manitoba Centennial Centre as a landscaped sunken garden, bordering the Centennial Concert Hall on the south and the Manitoba Museum on the north. It was named for Maitland Steinkopf, a former member of the provincial government who oversaw the development of the Centennial Centre.

This space originally featured a large pool with 16 fountains at its west end, above which was suspended an angled stair, connecting the ground level to the sunken garden. This pool was removed, however, during a 2011 renovation by a Winnipeg landscape architecture firm, adding a ramp at the garden's east side as well as sculptural Tyndall stone seating and signage.
