= Manitoba Opera =

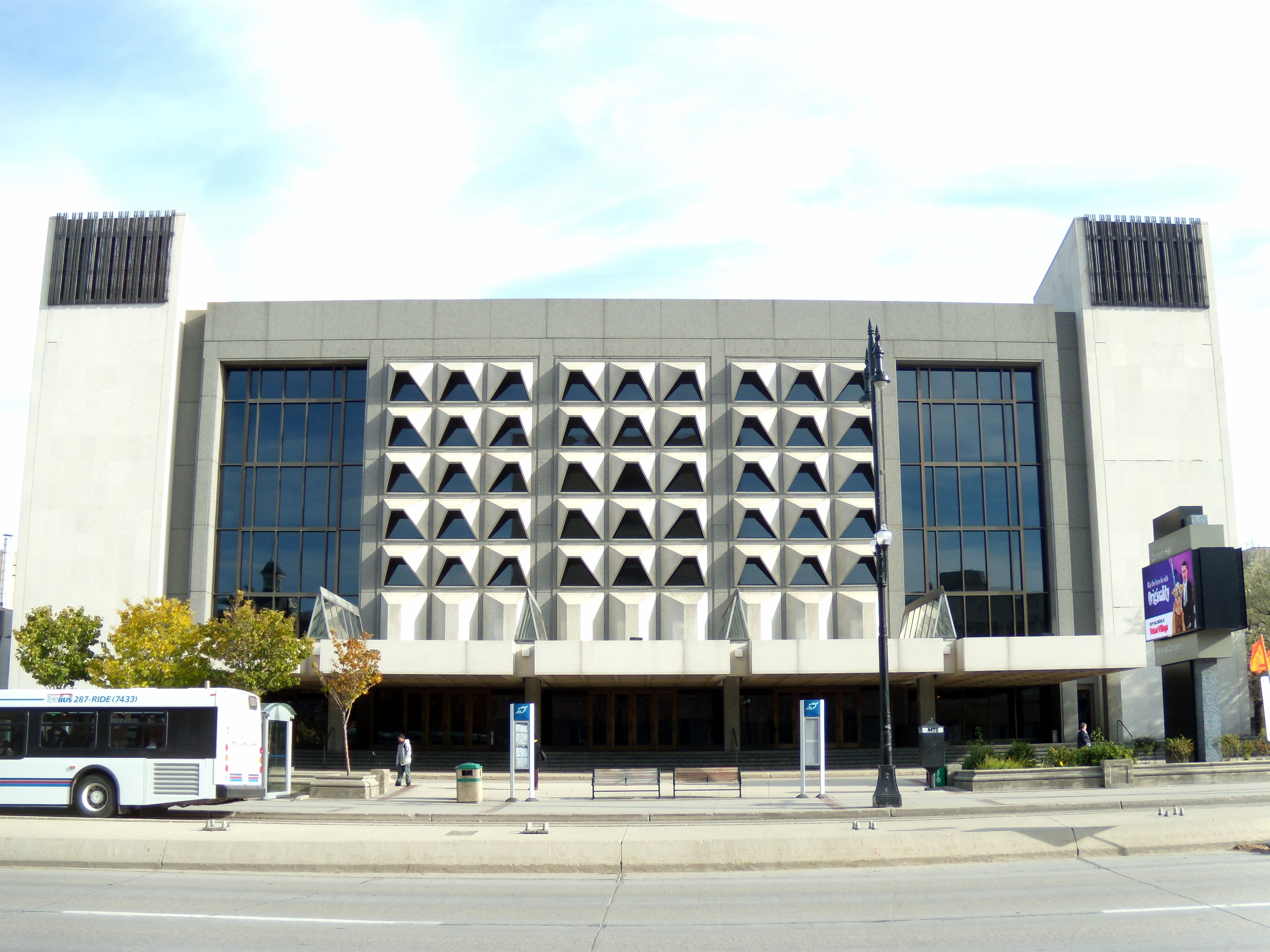
- The Centennial Concert Hall, as part of the Manitoba Centennial Centre is the performing home of the Manitoba Opera.
- Trade name: Manitoba Opera Association
- Genre: Opera
- Founded: 1969
- Founder: Justice Kerr Twaddle
- Headquarters: Centennial Concert Hall, Winnipeg
- Key people: Gordon Gerrard (Artistic Director Designate), Michael Blais (Executive Director), Larry Desrochers (Former General Director, Current Interim Artistic Director)
- Website: mbopera.ca

Manitoba Opera is a full-time professional opera company in Winnipeg, Manitoba, based at the Centennial Concert Hall.

Founded in 1969, Manitoba Opera is one of several western Canadian opera companies that flourished under the so-called "father of opera in Western Canada," Irving Guttman.

Live music for Manitoba Opera productions is provided by the Winnipeg Symphony Orchestra.

The Opera also serves northwestern Ontario, Saskatchewan, and the Dakotas in the US.

== History ==
Manitoba Opera was founded in 1969 and incorporated in 1970, with its first production being a concert version of Giuseppe Verdi's Il Trovatore in 1972. The Opera's first fully-staged production was in March 1973 with Madama Butterfly.

From the 1970s through 1998, the Opera led by the artistic direction of Irving Guttman, known as the "father of opera in Western Canada." Guttman would be instrumental in the development of many young Canadian singers, including Winnipeg native Tracy Dahl (soprano) and Winkler's Phillip Ens (bass). Both have gone on to international careers.

In November 2007, the company staged its first full-length original production, Transit of Venus, composed by Victor Davies, with a libretto by Maureen Hunter, based on her stage play of the same name.

Larry Desrochers was appointed CEO and General Director in November 2000. Ending his tenure in 2026, he was the longest serving opera leader in Canada and one of the longest in North America. With Desrochers decision not to renew, the company promoted Director of Operations, Michael Blais, to Executive Director. In June 2026, Manitoba Opera announced Manitoba-born conductor Gordon Gerrard as their new Artistic Director.

Tyrone Paterson served as Music Advisor and Principal Conductor since 2004. He concluded his tenure in 2025.

== Alumni ==
Directors and conductors at the company have included Richard Bradshaw, Herman Geiger-Torel, Anton Guadagno, Irving Guttman, Imre Pallo, and Alfredo Silipigni.

The company has also seen various notable singers in leading roles, including Tracy Dahl, Victor Braun, Judith Forst, Maureen Forrester, Richard Margison, Allan Monk, Leona Mitchell, Diana Soviero, and Heather Thomson.
