= Centennial Concert Hall =

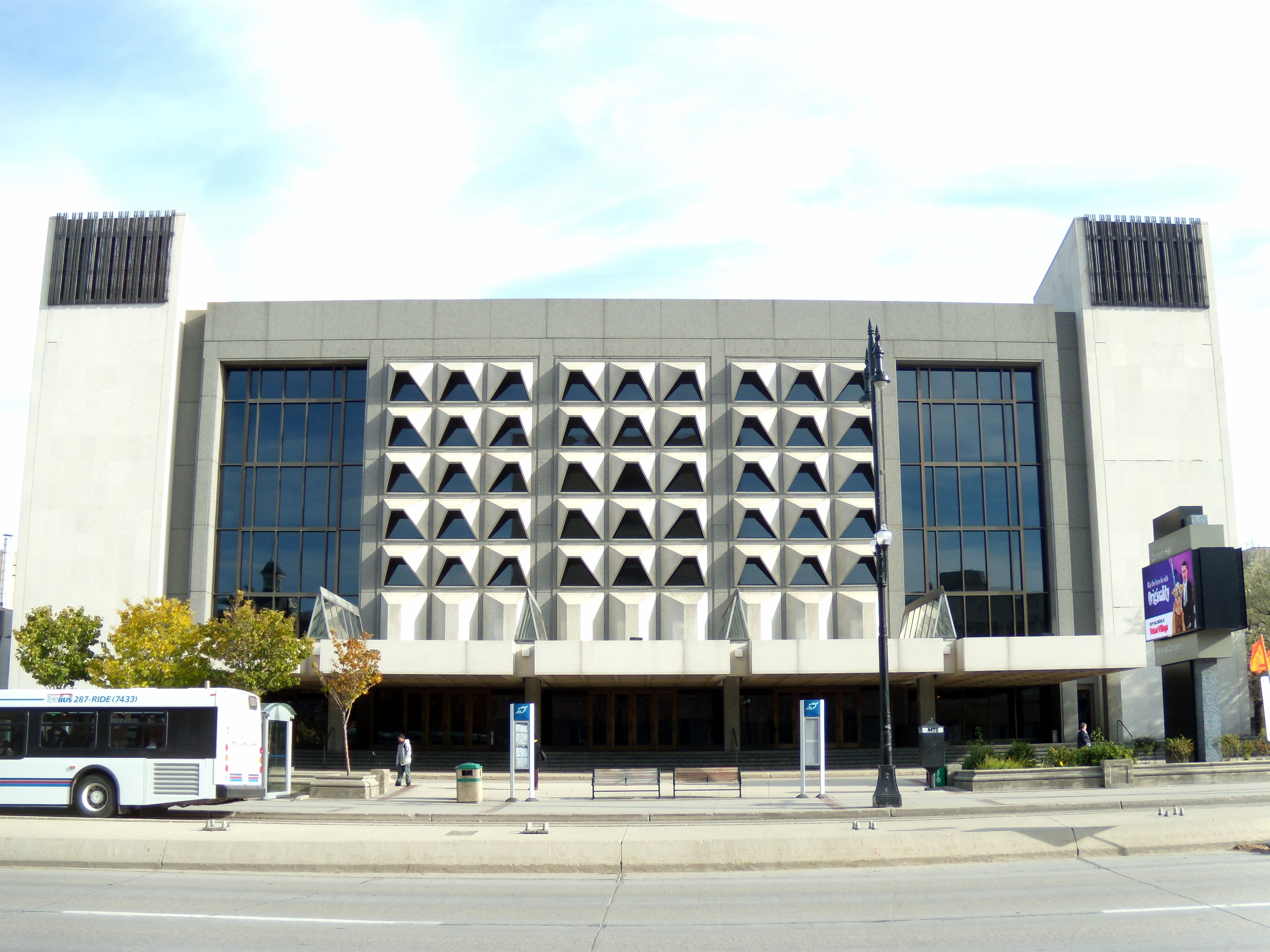
- Centennial Concert Hall
- Interactive map of Centennial Concert Hall
- Location: 555 Main St, Winnipeg, Manitoba, Canada
- Coordinates: 49.89968°N 97.136715°W
- Capacity: 2,305
- Public transit: Winnipeg Transit; FX2 FX3

Construction
- Opened: March 25, 1968; 58 years ago
- Cost: C$7.5 million
- Architects: Green, Blankstein, Russell Assoc., Moody, Moore, Whenham & Partner; Smith, Carter, Searle Associates

Tenants
- Winnipeg Symphony Orchestra Royal Winnipeg Ballet Manitoba Opera

Website
- centennialconcerthall.com

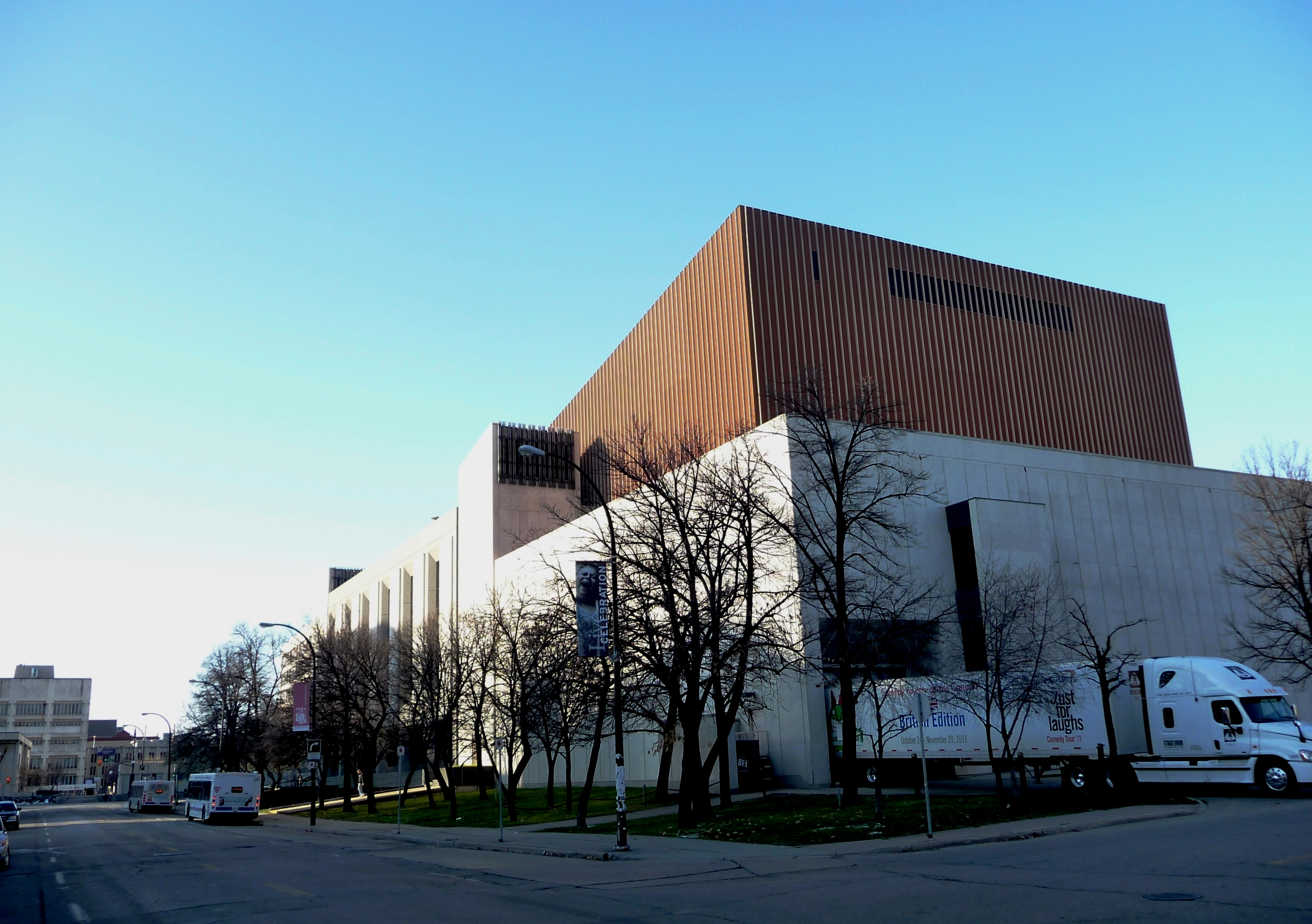
The Centennial Concert Hall from the rear

Centennial Concert Hall is a 2,305-seat performing arts centre located at 555 Main Street in downtown Winnipeg, Manitoba, Canada, as part of the Manitoba Centennial Centre. The concert hall opened on March 25, 1968.

It is the performing home of the Winnipeg Symphony Orchestra (WSO), the Royal Winnipeg Ballet, as well as the Manitoba Opera.

== History ==
It began as an urban renewal program in 1960. The Centennial Concert Hall, as part of the Manitoba Centennial Centre, was built as a Canadian Centennial project and is connected to the Manitoba Museum. The venue has a seating capacity of 2,305. The stage is 24 metres (79 ft) wide, 12 metres (39 ft) deep and over 33 metres (108 ft) tall which can accommodate a full orchestra and a choir of 700.

The Centennial Concert Hall supports Manitoba visual artists through monthly exhibitions on the Piano Nobile, the Gallery has featured the creations of over 200 Manitoba artists. This spacious area overlooking the main lobby offers high ceilings, majestic chandeliers and a grand piano. Murals by Canadian sculptor Greta Dale and Winnipeg artist Tony Tascona occupy spaces throughout the hall.

Centennial Concert Hall also hosts a wide variety of local and global artists, dance companies and musicals.

After 47 years it was decided to replace and upgrade the aging lighting system with LED technology. Initially at first there was reservation as to whether the LED system would throw enough light onto the stage. The new ArcSystem lighting was installed in 2015.

By the spring of 2016 the acoustic shell, the movable wall portion of the stage that helps to amplify sounds coming from the orchestra was in need of major repairs. The mechanical system that lifts the walls up and out of the way when not in use were deemed to be dangerous to operate, lest it come crashing down. The acoustic shell has not operated since that time, until it is repaired or replaced. In the interim, amplification/reverb is created electronically.

A Conceptual Development Plan was published in 2017. In it the MCCC will add another venue so that travelling shows could still use the Concert Hall while the WSO plays at a new 35,000 ft^{2} (3,300 m^{2}) Music Hall simultaneously.

It was discovered in the spring of 2019 that the roof of the concert hall needs $15 million worth of roof repairs to the 51 year old venue. At the time, the lobby ceiling was constructed with asbestos. The Province has set aside funds to help pay for the repairs of the roof.

In 2026, the concert hall hosted its first ever pro wrestling event, produced by Winnipeg Pro Wrestling and accompanied by the Winnipeg Symphony Orchestra.

== Construction ==
Governor General Roland Michener opened the Centennial Concert Hall 25 March 1968. The architects of the Hall were Green, Blankstein, Russell Assoc., Moody, Moore, Whenham & Partners, and Smith, Carter, Searle Associates, which are all located in Winnipeg. Theatre consultant George Izenour contributed to the design of the hall, and the acoustic engineering was by the firm of Bolt, Beranek & Newman Inc. The Winnipeg Architecture Foundation describes the design of the building as having a modern influence. The exterior design presents a balance of orthogonal lines and angles, glass and masonry, light cream and dark charcoal tones. The building's coloration complements and parallels those of the Winnipeg City Hall across Main Street – which also features Tyndall stone and deep grey masonry.
