= Herbert Henry Gatenby Moody =

Canadian architect

- Born: 12 March 1903; Winnipeg, Manitoba, Canada
- Died: 27 February 1991 (aged 87); Vancouver, British Columbia, Canada
- Education: Royal Military College of Canada; University of Manitoba,
- Occupation: Architect
- Practice: Moody and Moore, Winnipeg (1936-1966)
- Buildings: University College & St. John's College and Chapel University of Manitoba, Centennial Hall & Lockhart Hall, University of Winnipeg; Manitoba Museum
- Projects: Princess Elizabeth Hospital;

Herbert Henry Gatenby Moody was a Canadian architect. He was born on 12 March 1903 to A. W. Moody and Elizabeth Jane Holland. He was educated at the Royal Military College of Canada in Kingston, Ontario, and graduated from the University of Manitoba with a degree in architecture in 1926, then practising architecture with Derby and Robinson Boston and Sproatt and Rolf Toronto, Ontario.

He went into partnership with Robert E. Moore from 1936–1976, in the architectural firm of Moody and Moore in Winnipeg, Manitoba.

Moody joined the Manitoba Association of Architects in 1934, and served as its president three times. He was a Fellow of the Royal Architectural Institute of Canada, and served as Chancellor of the College of Fellows.

He served with the Royal Canadian Engineers, Army Third Division, in England and northwest Europe, from 1941 to 1945.

== Family ==
He had two children with his first wife Alice Louise Taylor (1904–1938), and one with his second wife, Lorraine Code (1908–1986).

== Professional life ==
Among the many projects Moody completed in his career are the following:

- Princess Elizabeth Hospital, 1950
- Winnipeg Winter Club (200 River Avenue), c1950
- St. John's College and Chapel, University of Manitoba (92 Dysart Road), 1958
- Donnelly United Church (1226 Waller Avenue), 1964
- University College, University of Manitoba (210 Dysart Road), 1964
- Centennial Hall, University of Winnipeg (515 Portage Avenue), 1969–1972
- Lockhart Hall, University of Winnipeg (Ellice Avenue), 1972
- Royal Canadian Mounted Police D Division (Manitoba) Headquarters (1091 Portage Avenue), 1978
- Fort Whyte Interpretive Centre, 1983 Fort Whyte Nature Centre
- Winnipeg Arena
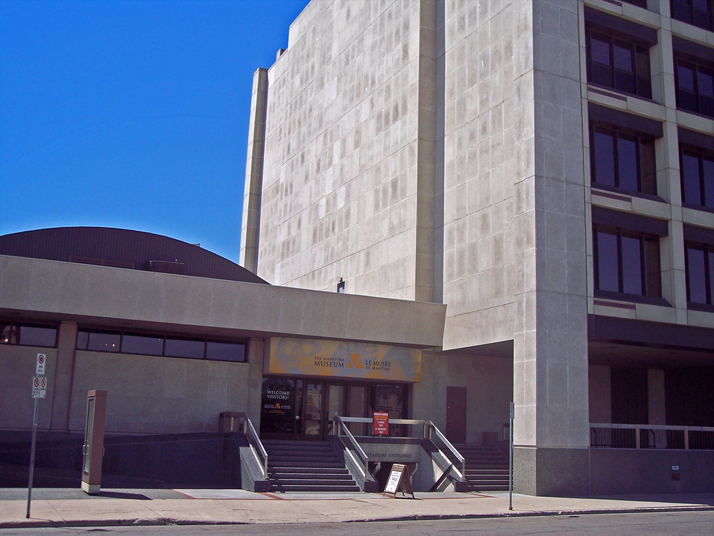
Manitoba Museum (190 Rupert Avenue), 1973
