= Tony Tascona =

Canadian artist (b. 1926, d. 2006)

- Born: 16 March 1926; Saint Boniface, Manitoba, Canada
- Died: 28 May 2006 (aged 80)
- Notable work: Commission for the Lobby of Manitoba Centennial Concert Hall, Commission for the Freshwater Institute, Commission for the Winnipeg Centennial Library, Commission for the Manitoba Law Courts Building
- Awards: Royal Architecture Institute of Canada Arts Medal 1970, Canadian Silver Jubilee Medal 1977, Academia Italia Del Arti e Del Lavoro Gold Medal 1980, Order of Canada 1996

Antonio Tascona CM RCA (16 March 1926 – 28 May 2006) was a Canadian artist of Italian heritage, best known for his abstract constructions featuring metallic panels made of aluminum, steel, epoxy resin, and industrial paints and lacquers.

Tascona's employment in the aircraft industry as a technician taught him the techniques used in his mature work featuring geometric abstraction. His work hangs in numerous public institutions in and throughout Canada. He was appointed to the Order of Canada in 1996.

== Early life and education ==
Tascona was born the fifteenth of sixteen children in the predominantly francophone town of St Boniface, Manitoba, before it was incorporated into Winnipeg in 1971. Tascona left school and became a truck-driver at age 15 in order to support his family after his father's death. When he was seventeen his mother died and he would be conscripted into the Canadian Army at 18, but never deployed overseas.

In 1946, Tascona enrolled in the Winnipeg School of Art through the Department of Veterans' Affairs. His instructor Joe Plaskett introduced him to Hans Hofmann's theories on abstraction. After receiving his diploma, he continued his education at the University of Manitoba School of Art and was there exposed to other modernist movements such as Vorticism.

In 1953 Tascona began work as a technician for Trans-Canada Airlines where he developed his skills and interest in working with a variety of industrial techniques and materials including a fascination with aluminum, high-grade paints, lacquers and enamels. This formation of interest extended to his brother's auto-body garage, where Tascona became interested in the use of car paint, borrowing paint chips and supplies for use in his own studio. In 1961, Tascona moved to Montreal where he became acquainted with the works of Les plasticiens artists such as Guido Molinari and Claude Tousignant for what he called their "direct, more mathematical, more geometric approach.” In 1965, Tascona was introduced to the theories of Constructivism by William Townsend. However Tascona was not interested in the explicitly political elements inherent to Constructivism. Nonetheless Tascona was inspired by Tatlin's prediction that the art of the future would be synthesised with principles of technology and construction.

== Development of constructions ==
Utilizing the skills he learned in the aircraft industry, Tascona began in the late 1960s and would continue throughout the 70's and 80's to produce large format constructions built from incised metal sheets painted with industrial strength paints and lacquers giving these works a sculptural, frieze-like quality while still possessing certain modernist formal elements. An early example is Tascona's first major commission in 1963 for the Manitoba Centennial Concert Hall which still hangs in situ today. This was his first construction and consisted of two ten by sixteen foot constructions consisting of numerous layered sheets of aluminium and painted using his unique industry-inspired technique.
