= Manitoba Crown Services =

Agency overview
- Headquarters: Manitoba Legislative Building, Winnipeg, MB
- Annual budget: $3.495 m CAD (2020/2021)
- Ministers responsible: Adrien Sala, Minister Responsible for Manitoba Hydro; Matt Wiebe, Minister Responsible for Manitoba Public Insurance (MPI); Mike Moyes, Minister Responsible for Efficiency Manitoba; Glen Simard, Minister Responsible for Manitoba Liquor and Lotteries; Nellie Kennedy, Minister Responsible for the Manitoba Centennial Centre Corporation
- Key document: Crown Corporation Governance and Accountability Act
- Website: gov.mb.ca/cs/

Manitoba Crown Services—through the Crown Services Secretariat—provides strategic, regulatory, and policy support to the Crown corporations of Manitoba, as well as assisting in the reporting and oversight of all Crown corporations governed by the Crown Corporation Governance and Accountability Act.

There are currently five Crown corporations governed by Act: Manitoba Hydro, Manitoba Public Insurance, Manitoba Liquor & Lotteries, Manitoba Centennial Centre Corporation, and Efficiency Manitoba. These corporations must abide by the following principal reporting requirements: a roles and responsibility record, annual business plans, and quarterly and annual financial reports.

Oversight over Manitoba's crown corporations was previously the responsibility of an 8-member panel called the Crown Corporations Council, which was dissolved in 2016.

The Secretariat consists of two units:

- the Policy Unit — "prepares documents, manages legislative and regulatory needs, provides analysis of major capital proposals and liaises with Crowns to address concerns of Manitobans."
- the Regulatory Unit — "ensures compliance with reporting requirements of the act, and provides analysis and advice with respect to business plans, capital plans and other major decisions that boards of the Crown corporations may make."

== History ==
The Crown Corporations Public Review and Accountability Act was enacted in 1989 to ensure that public confidence in Manitoba's Crown corporations is maintained and to strengthen the accountability mechanisms for Manitoba's Crown corporations. This Act established the Crown Corporations Council as a corporation responsible to the Minister of Finance, who was charged with the administration of the Act.

In 2016, Manitoba's Progressive Conservative administration introduced legislation to repeal the Crown Corporations Public Review and Accountability Act and scrap the Crown Corporations Council. The Crown Corporations Governance and Accountability Act was subsequently passed in 2017, creating a new governance model for the Manitoba Centennial Centre, Manitoba Hydro, Manitoba Liquor and Lotteries, and Manitoba Public Insurance.
