= Manitoba Museum =

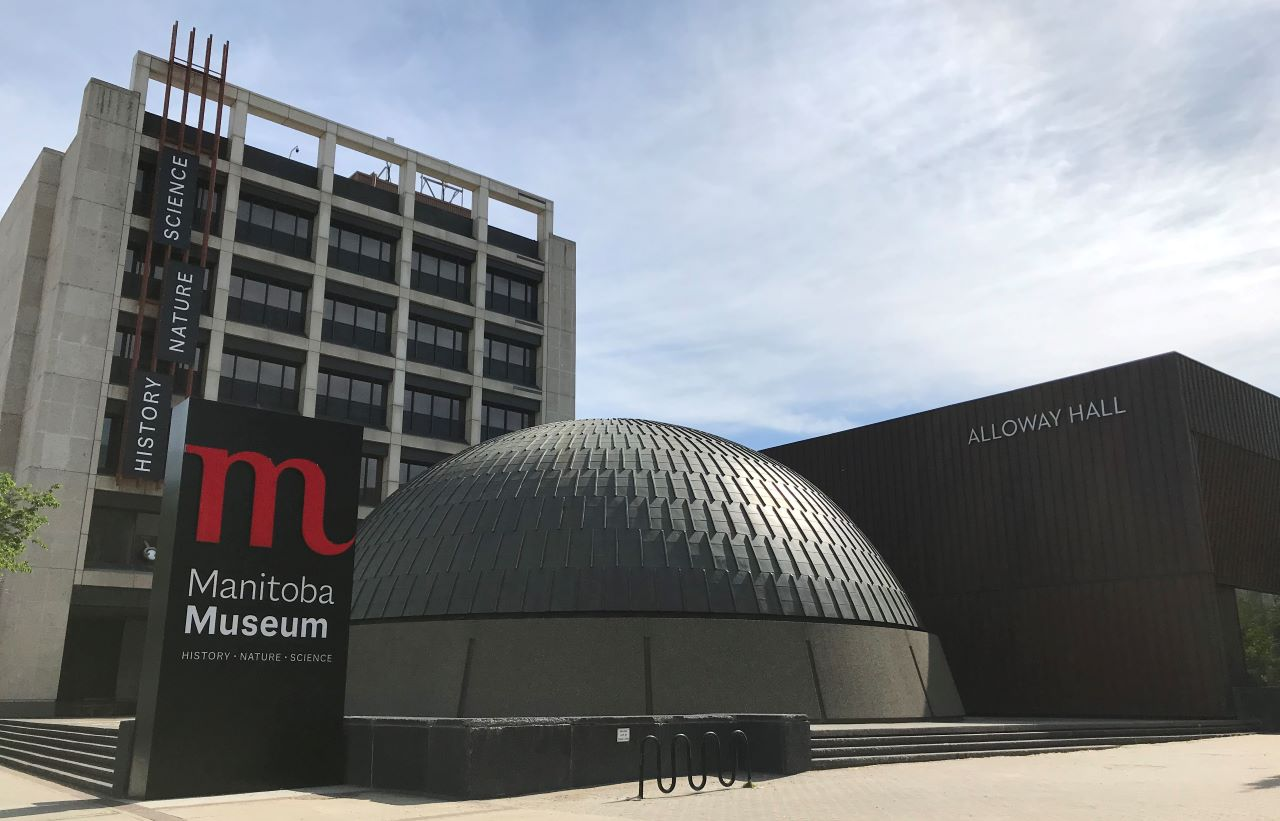
- Former name: Manitoba Museum of Man and Nature
- Established: 1965
- Location: Winnipeg, Manitoba, Canada
- Coordinates: 49°54′00″N 97°08′12″W
- Type: provincial human and natural history museum
- Key holdings: Hudson's Bay Company Collection
- Visitors: 303,191 (2017)
- Director: Dorota Blumczynska
- Architect: Herbert Henry Gatenby Moody
- Owner: Manitoba Centennial Centre
- Public transit access: Winnipeg Transit; FX2 FX3
- Website: www.manitobamuseum.ca/

The Manitoba Museum, previously the Manitoba Museum of Man and Nature, is a human and natural history museum in Winnipeg, Manitoba, as well as the province's largest, not-for-profit centre for heritage and science education.

Located close to City Hall, the museum was designed in 1965 by Herbert Henry Gatenby Moody of Moody and Moore. Including its Planetarium and Science Gallery exhibit, the museum focuses on collecting, researching, and sharing Manitoba's human and natural heritage, culture, and environment.

The Hudson's Bay Company donated its historic three-centuries-old collection (and supporting funds) to the museum in 1994, becoming the largest corporate donation ever received by the museum.

== History ==
=== Foundations (1879–1932) ===
In 1879, the Historical and Scientific Society of Manitoba officially began to collect and preserve its heritage at some unknown location.

In the early 1890s, E. Thompson Seton wrote about the Manitoba Museum, which was reportedly housed in the basement of Winnipeg's City Hall.

Though, as of 1900, there was no public museum in Winnipeg, there were significant private collectors: from 1911 to the early 1920s, material from their collections was exhibited in the Exposition Building of the former Winnipeg Industrial Bureau at Main Street and Water. The present museum holds some of these collections although most were dispersed.

In 1932, the Natural History Society of Manitoba, the Winnipeg Board of Trade, and the Auditorium Commission founded the Manitoba Museum Association.

=== The volunteer museum (1932–1954) ===
The Manitoba Museum officially opened its doors on 15 December 1932 in the newly built Winnipeg Civic Auditorium (now the Archives of Manitoba Building) on Memorial Boulevard alongside the Winnipeg Art Gallery (WAG). The museum remained in that location with the WAG until 1967. Critical support for outreach programs and exhibits came from the Carnegie Corporation and Junior League.

Professors at the University of Manitoba, formerly the Manitoba Agriculture College, played significant roles in the museum's development. The museum was run by volunteer honorary curators, with assistance from other volunteers and a small staff.

As the museum grew in acquisitions and attendance, the need for an expanded facility became critical. So, in 1954, the Board began planning a new institution, which would reflect the values of the time, consulting extensively with the American Museum of Natural History and the Hayden Planetarium.

Funding came in large part from federal project sources designed to create new Canadian cultural facilities for the 1967 Canadian Centennial commemoration.

=== Centennial museum (1964–1972) ===
In March 1964, the Manitoba Museum Association, which operated the museum, proposed the construction of a new museum and planetarium to the Government of Manitoba, headed by Premier Duff Roblin. The proposal argued that Manitoba needed a modern museum that would interpret the province's natural environment, history, industry and culture through research and public education rather than simply displaying collections of specimens and artifacts. It stated:

Manitoba needs a Modern Museum of Man and Nature. Not a collection of stuffed birds, antiquated firearms or dusty rocks, but a living history of man and his environment, tracing the evolution of Manitoba's resources, industry and culture, past and present, and pointing the way, through research, to the future. To inform, instruct and educate by interpreting nature to man and their effect on each other in the function of a Modern Museum of Man and Nature.

The following year, in 1965, provincial legislation dissolved the unincorporated Manitoba Museum Association and created two successor organizations, the Manitoba Museum of Man and Nature and the Manitoba Planetarium. Both became part of the planned Manitoba Centennial Centre, one of several provincial cultural institutions established to commemorate the centennial of Canada in 1967 and the centennial of Manitoba in 1970.

As plans for the Manitoba Museum of Man and Nature advanced, the institution transitioned from a volunteer-run organization to a professional one. Paid curatorial positions replaced volunteer curators, who became members of the Museum Advisory Council. H. David Hemphill became managing director, serving from 1970 to 1988. During 1968 and 1969, as construction neared completion, the museum's collections were placed in storage before being transferred to the museum's new building. Construction ultimately cost CA$3,548,700.

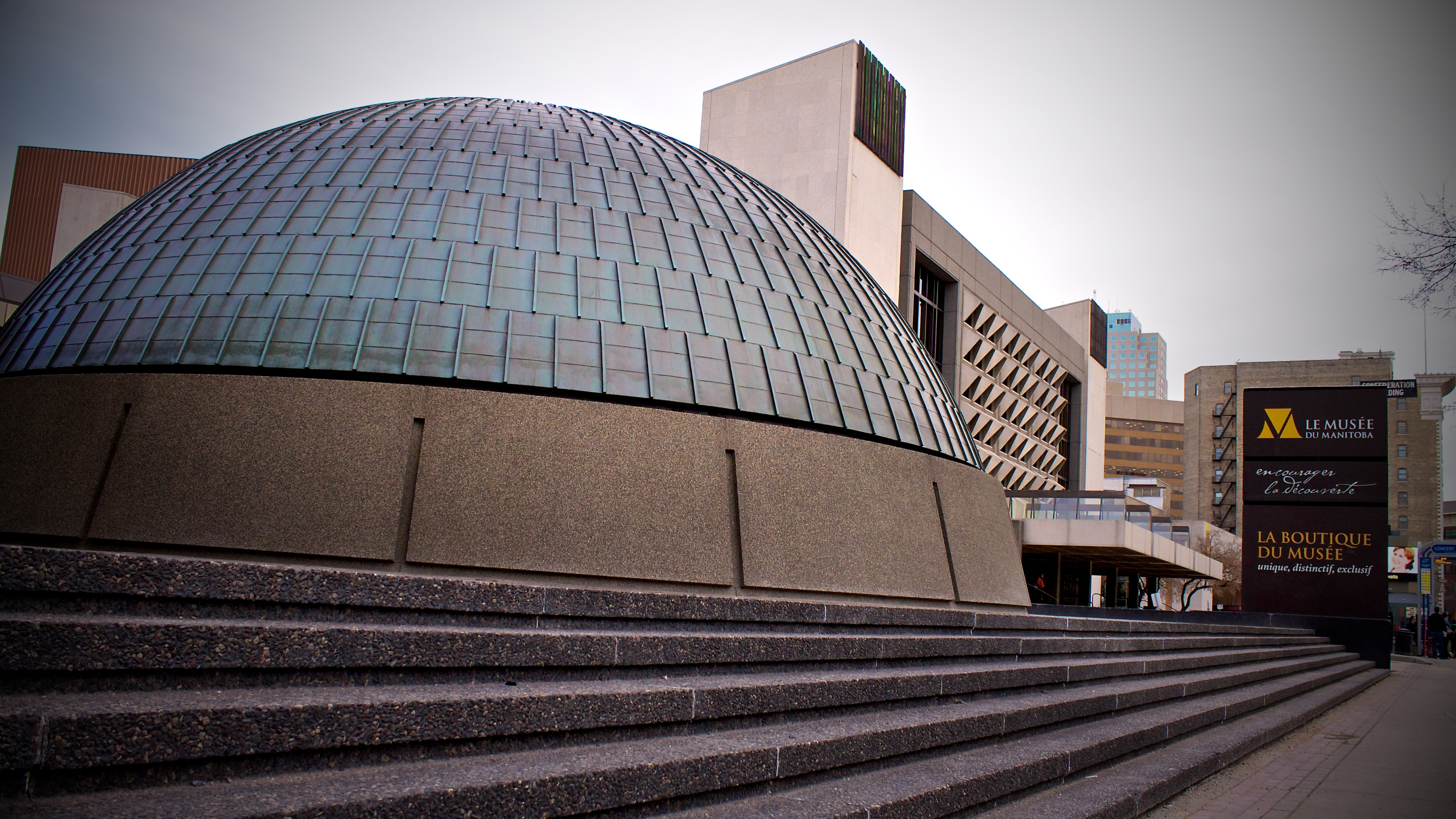
The planetarium was opened in 1968, two years prior to the museum's facilities opening in 1970.

The Manitoba Planetarium became the first part of the complex to open when Lieutenant Governor Richard Spink Bowles officially inaugurated it on 15 May 1968. Two years later, on 15 July 1970, Queen Elizabeth II officially opened the museum's first galleries, the Orientation and Grasslands galleries, as part of Manitoba's centennial celebrations. The collections assembled by the earlier Manitoba Museum formed the foundation of the new institution.

In July 1972, the Manitoba Museum of Man and Nature and the Manitoba Planetarium were formally integrated into a single organization.

=== Expansion and renewal (1972–present) ===
Following the integration of the museum and planetarium in 1972, the Manitoba Museum gradually expanded its permanent exhibitions. The museum initially opened with two galleries in 1970. Over the next three decades, it added the Earth History Gallery in 1973, the Urban Gallery in 1974, the Arctic and Subarctic Gallery in 1976, and the Boreal Forest Gallery in 1980. By 2003, the opening of the Parklands / Mixed-Woods Gallery completed the museum's original gallery plan.

While continuing to expand its exhibitions, the museum also expanded its organization and facilities during the 1990s. In December 1996, the Manitoba Museum Foundation was established as an independent charitable foundation, and the institution formally adopted the name The Manitoba Museum in 1997. At the same time, the museum constructed a new east wing to house the Hudson's Bay Company Museum Collection and research facilities. The wing opened in 1998, and two years later, in 2000, the Hudson's Bay Company Gallery opened to the public following the company's 1994 donation of its collection.

Entering the 21st century, the museum continued to renew its permanent galleries. The Science Gallery opened in 2008, replacing the former Touch the Universe Gallery. Beginning in 2017, the museum undertook a capital renewal program that expanded Alloway Hall, renewed the Nonsuch Gallery and Boreal Forest Corridor, created the Winnipeg Gallery in 2019, and renewed the Welcome Gallery before opening the Prairies Gallery in 2021. By 2021, the project had also upgraded the museum's building systems and visitor facilities.

== Architecture ==
=== Site ===
The Manitoba Museum occupies a prominent site at 190 Rupert Avenue in downtown Winnipeg, at the corner of Rupert Avenue and Main Street. It forms part of the Manitoba Centennial Centre, a provincial cultural complex constructed between 1968 and 1970 to commemorate the centennials of Canada (1967) and Manitoba (1970). The complex also includes the Centennial Concert Hall and the Manitoba Planetarium.

The museum stands opposite Winnipeg City Hall and beside Steinkopf Gardens, a landscaped public space named for provincial cabinet minister Maitland Steinkopf, who oversaw development of the Centennial Centre. Pedestrian walkways and below-grade connections link the museum with the planetarium, concert hall and other facilities within the Centennial Centre.

=== Design ===
The Manitoba Museum was designed in the Modernist style as part of the Manitoba Centennial Centre, a provincially funded cultural complex developed between 1965 and 1970. The museum was designed by the architectural firms Green Blankstein Russell and Associates, Moody Moore Whenham and Partners, and Smith Carter Searle Associates. Construction was carried out in stages over approximately two years, with the Manitoba Planetarium opening in 1968 and the museum galleries following in 1970.

The museum shares a common architectural vocabulary with the other Centennial Centre buildings through its use of Tyndall stone, exposed aggregate concrete and bronze-coloured metal framing. Its low, horizontal exhibition halls are complemented by a six-storey tower, while the adjoining copper-clad dome of the planetarium provides a contrasting architectural form. Together, the buildings maintain the material palette used throughout the Centennial Centre.

The museum's principal entrance opens into a spacious lobby finished with terrazzo floors, Tyndall stone walls and decorative metal ceiling screens. From the lobby, visitors descend to the lower level, which houses the Manitoba Planetarium and Science Gallery and connects to the Centennial Concert Hall and underground parking. Beyond the lobby, the museum's permanent galleries occupy the main exhibition spaces within the building.

=== Expansion ===
The Manitoba Museum has undergone several major building additions over the five decades since opening in 1970. Its first major addition came four years after the museum opened, when the Nonsuch Gallery was completed in 1974 to house the full-size replica of the Nonsuch, the 17th-century ship whose voyage to Hudson Bay led to the founding of the Hudson's Bay Company. Because the gallery was built around the ship, the replica remains a permanent feature of the museum.

More than 20 years later, the museum added Alloway Hall in 1995 to provide space for travelling exhibitions. Designed by Smith Carter Architects and Engineers Inc., the addition occupied much of the museum's original courtyard and Main Street entranceway.

The museum expanded again over a two-year period between 1996 and 1998 with the construction of a new east wing to house the Hudson's Bay Company Museum Collection and research facilities. The wing officially opened in September 1998, while the Hudson's Bay Company Gallery opened to the public on 2 May 2000, following the company's decision in 1994 to designate the museum as the permanent home for its historic collection.

In 2017, Alloway Hall underwent a major expansion, doubling the exhibition space to 9,750 sq ft (906 m^{2}). The CA$5.3 million project introduced new lighting systems and 13 ft (4.0 m)-high windows overlooking Steinkopf Gardens and the Manitoba Centennial Centre.

== Museum galleries ==
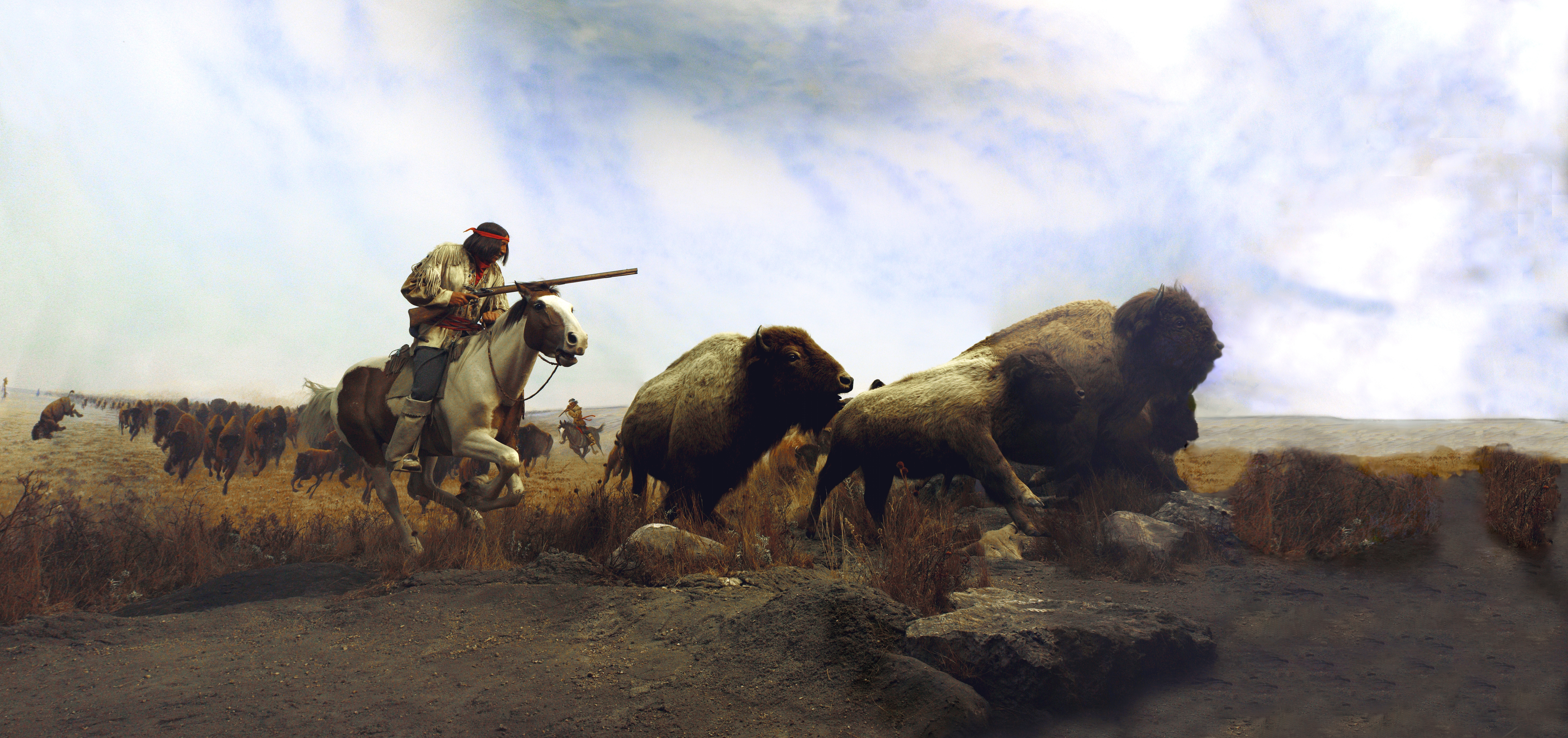
An interpretive gallery at the Manitoba Museum, 2010

With more than 2.9 million artifacts and specimens, the Manitoba Museum houses collections that reflect the human and natural history of Manitoba, shared with visitors through nine interpretive galleries.

=== Welcome Gallery ===
The Welcome Gallery occupies the space originally opened on 15 July 1970 as the museum's Orientation and Grasslands galleries. More than 50 years later, it was renewed in 2021 as part of the museum's four-year, CA$20.5 million Bringing Our Stories Forward capital renewal project. The renovation retained one of the museum's oldest exhibits while introducing new interpretation developed in partnership with Indigenous communities.

The gallery's centrepiece is the museum's original 15.5 m (51 ft) Red River buffalo hunt diorama, featuring a Métis hunter on horseback pursuing a herd of bison. Wildlife artist Clarence Tillenius created the diorama between 1963 and June 1970, spending more than five years researching and painting the scene before it was completed just weeks before the museum opened. It has remained one of the museum's signature exhibits ever since. During the 2021 renovation, the diorama was preserved while the surrounding space was redesigned to introduce visitors to the museum and its permanent galleries.

New exhibits, developed in partnership with the Treaty Relations Commission of Manitoba, feature treaty medals, ceremonial pipes and pipe bags associated with the Numbered Treaties. An animated projection traces 18,000 years of Manitoba's history, while an introductory display case presents representative artifacts and specimens from the museum's eight remaining permanent galleries.

=== Earth History Gallery ===
Opened in 1973, the Earth History Gallery explores more than two billion years of Manitoba's geological history through fossils, minerals, rocks and immersive exhibits. The gallery begins with displays of Precambrian rocks, minerals and crystals from the Canadian Shield before examining the tropical seas that later covered much of the province.

The gallery's Ordovician exhibits explore Manitoba about 450 million years ago, when the region lay beneath a warm, shallow tropical sea. Fossils of trilobites, corals, cephalopods and other marine animals illustrate the diversity of life that inhabited these waters. Highlights include a complete trilobite and the Ancient Seas exhibit, an immersive projection experience added in 2010 that recreates the underwater environment of the Ordovician Sea.

The gallery concludes with the Cretaceous Period, when a shallow inland sea again covered much of Manitoba about 90 million years ago. Displays include a large pliosaur recovered from the Manitoba Escarpment, a mosasaur and other marine reptiles, while an upper-level mezzanine overlooks many of the Cretaceous exhibits.

=== Arctic and Subarctic Gallery ===
Opened in 1976, the Arctic and Subarctic Gallery explores the landscapes, wildlife and cultures of northern Manitoba. The gallery begins along the western coast of Hudson Bay, where a large diorama depicts a polar bear feeding on a ringed seal beneath the aurora borealis. Smaller displays examine the Arctic tundra, the waters beneath Hudson Bay, and the plants and animals that inhabit the region.

The gallery then moves south into the Subarctic, where a diorama follows a herd of caribou migrating along an esker into the boreal forest. Exhibits explore the seasonal hunting, fishing and gathering traditions of the Kivallirmiut (Caribou Inuit) and Denesułine (Dene), whose lives were closely connected to the annual movements of wildlife.

The gallery concludes by examining how industrial development has changed northern Manitoba. Exhibits explore the effects of railways, mining and hydroelectric development on the region's landscapes and communities.

=== Boreal Forest Gallery ===
Opened in 1980, the Boreal Forest Gallery explores Manitoba's boreal forest, the province's largest terrestrial ecosystem, which covers about one-third of Manitoba. The gallery begins with a large diorama of a waterfall cascading over the Canadian Shield, introducing the landscapes, plants and animals of the boreal forest. From there, displays explore the forest ecosystem through wildlife, fungi and hundreds of insect specimens featured in the Boreal Forest Corridor, which was renewed in 2018.

The gallery then examines how Indigenous peoples have lived in and travelled through the boreal forest. A diorama depicts an Ithiniwak (Cree) family gathering food, while other exhibits include examples of pictographs and explore Indigenous connections to the forest.

The gallery concludes in the Upper Boreal Forest Gallery, an upper-level exhibition space examining the impact of forestry, mining and hydroelectric development on Manitoba's boreal forest and on traditional trapping and fishing.

=== Nonsuch Gallery ===
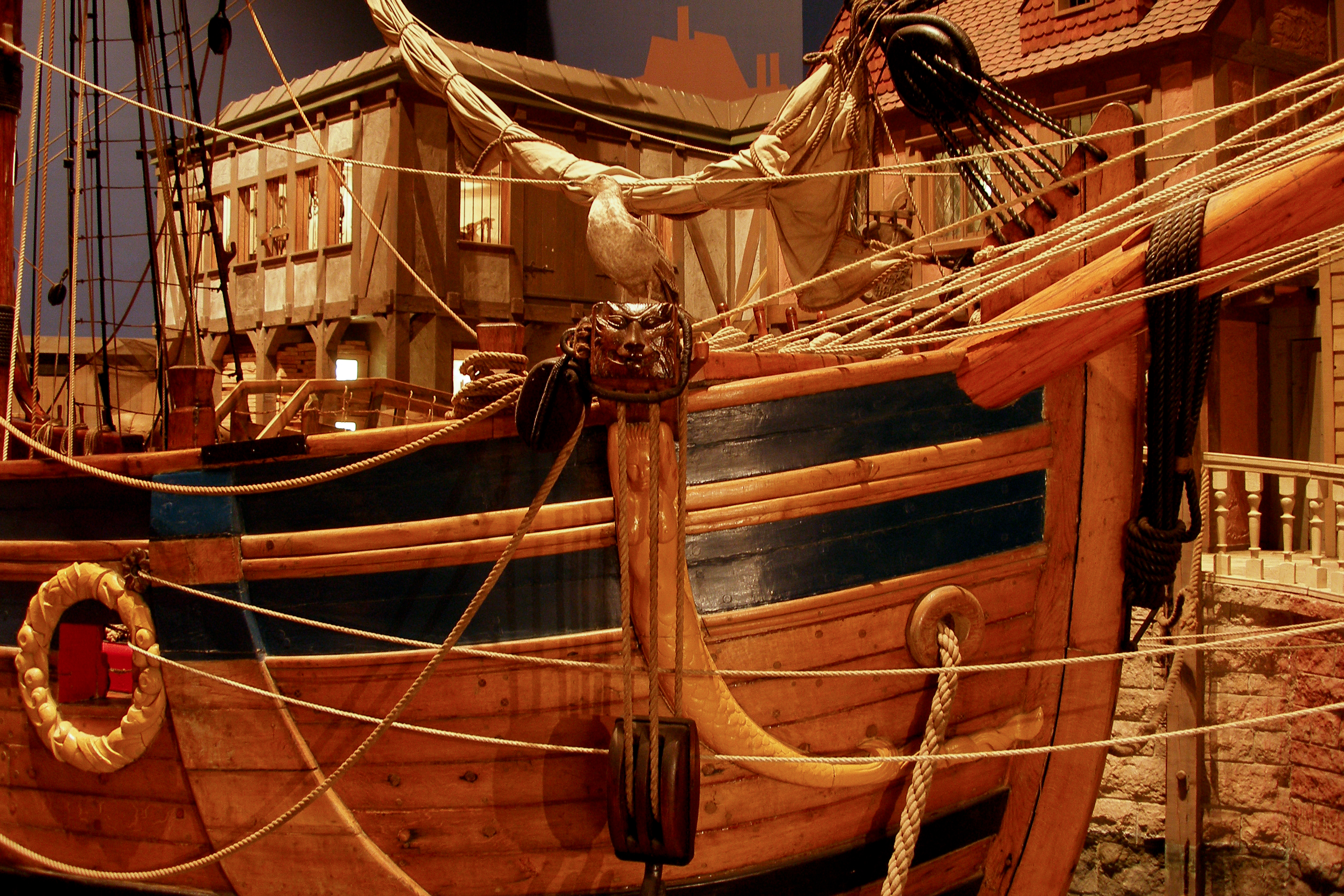
The museum's collection includes a full-size replica of the Nonsuch.

The Nonsuch Gallery houses the museum's showcase piece: a full-size replica of the Nonsuch, the ship whose voyage in 1668 led to the founding of the Hudson's Bay Company (HBC). The rest of the Nonsuch Gallery imitates a scene set a wharf in 1669 Deptford, England, where the ship has 'docked'. The Nonsuch replica was built in England in 1968 to celebrate the 300th anniversary of the HBC, and sailed 14,000 kilometres (8,700 mi) of water before reaching the Manitoba Museum in 1974. Moreover, the gallery walls were built around the replica, hence why it cannot be removed from the museum without dismantling it. Built using hand tools of the 17th century, it is considered one of the finest replicas in the world.

=== Hudson's Bay Company Gallery ===
Opened on 2 May 2000, following the Hudson's Bay Company's 1994 donation of its museum collection, the Hudson's Bay Company Gallery explores the history of the company and the North American fur trade from the 17th century onward. Through artifacts from the Hudson's Bay Company Museum Collection, it examines trade, exploration and interactions with Indigenous peoples across Rupert's Land and later northern and western Canada.

The gallery features recreated historical settings, including a fur trading post, a trapline camp, a York boat, and a reconstruction of the company's former boardroom in London, England. Displays include trade goods, furs, navigational equipment, and artifacts associated with company employees, fur-trade families, and First Nations, Métis, and Inuit communities.

An upper-level Nautical Balcony explores the company's maritime history and scientific collecting. The gallery adjoins the Nonsuch Gallery, where visitors can view the museum's full-size replica of the Nonsuch, whose 1668 voyage led to the founding of the Hudson's Bay Company.

=== Parklands / Mixed-Woods Gallery ===
Opened in 2003, the Parklands / Mixed-Woods Gallery completed the museum's original permanent gallery plan. It explores Manitoba's mixed-wood parklands, a transitional region between the boreal forest and the prairies, through exhibits on the region's natural and human history.

The gallery is arranged over two levels. The upper level focuses on the region's ecology, with a principal diorama depicting the Birdtail Valley in Riding Mountain National Park, exhibits recreating the Carberry Sand Dunes, and displays of plants, fungi, insects, amphibians, reptiles, birds and mammals. Pull-out drawers contain specimens, animal-track casts and artifacts.

The lower level examines human history. Visitors pass a recreation of a limestone sinkhole near Narcisse in Manitoba's Interlake region, where red-sided garter snakes emerge each spring, before entering a recreated limestone cave containing models of hibernating bats. Other exhibits include a Métis kitchen, displays on treaties and contemporary Indigenous experiences, archaeological artifacts spanning approximately 11,000 years of Manitoba history, and exhibits on immigration and Manitoba during the First and Second World Wars.

=== Prairies Gallery ===
Opened on 8 April 2021, the Prairies Gallery explores Manitoba's prairie grasslands, the province's smallest and most densely populated biome. Developed with guidance from the Museum Indigenous Advisory Circle and the Museum Community Engagement Team of Newcomers to Manitoba, the gallery begins on the open prairie, where exhibits examine plants, animals and fungi adapted to the grasslands. Displays include a pronghorn diorama, the wetlands of Whitewater Lake, ground squirrel burrows and other prairie wildlife.

The focus then shifts to people who have lived on the prairies over thousands of years. An eroding riverbank display presents layers of geological and human history, while a recreation of the Brockinton archaeological site explores the use of bison pounds. Other exhibits include a full-sized tipi, a Red River cabin and cart, a reconstructed schoolroom and video stories from Manitobans.

The gallery concludes by examining the modern prairie landscape. Exhibits address Manitoba's endangered species and historical injustices against Indigenous peoples, while interpreting the biodiversity and continuing human history of the prairie region.

=== Winnipeg Gallery ===
The Winnipeg Gallery opened on 1 November 2019 dedicated to the story of Winnipeg's development over the past century, integrating Indigenous history with Manitoba's 150 years of immigration. It features a stained-glass logo of Winnipeg, which used to be located at the old "gingerbread" City Hall and has not been seen since the 1960s. The gallery also features a timeline film, framed by the former Eaton's Place entrance, that presents the chronological history of Winnipeg. Themes in this gallery include Winnipeg as an "Indigenous Homeland," as a "City of Newcomers," or as a "City of Celebrations," in a seven-meter long case full of artifacts. The Winnipeg Gallery also includes a Personalities Wall, showcasing 30 individuals who are part of the city's history. The much loved Urban Gallery exhibit, now called Winnipeg 1920, is part of the new Winnipeg Gallery, and recreates a Winnipeg street scene in the 1920s.

=== Science Gallery ===
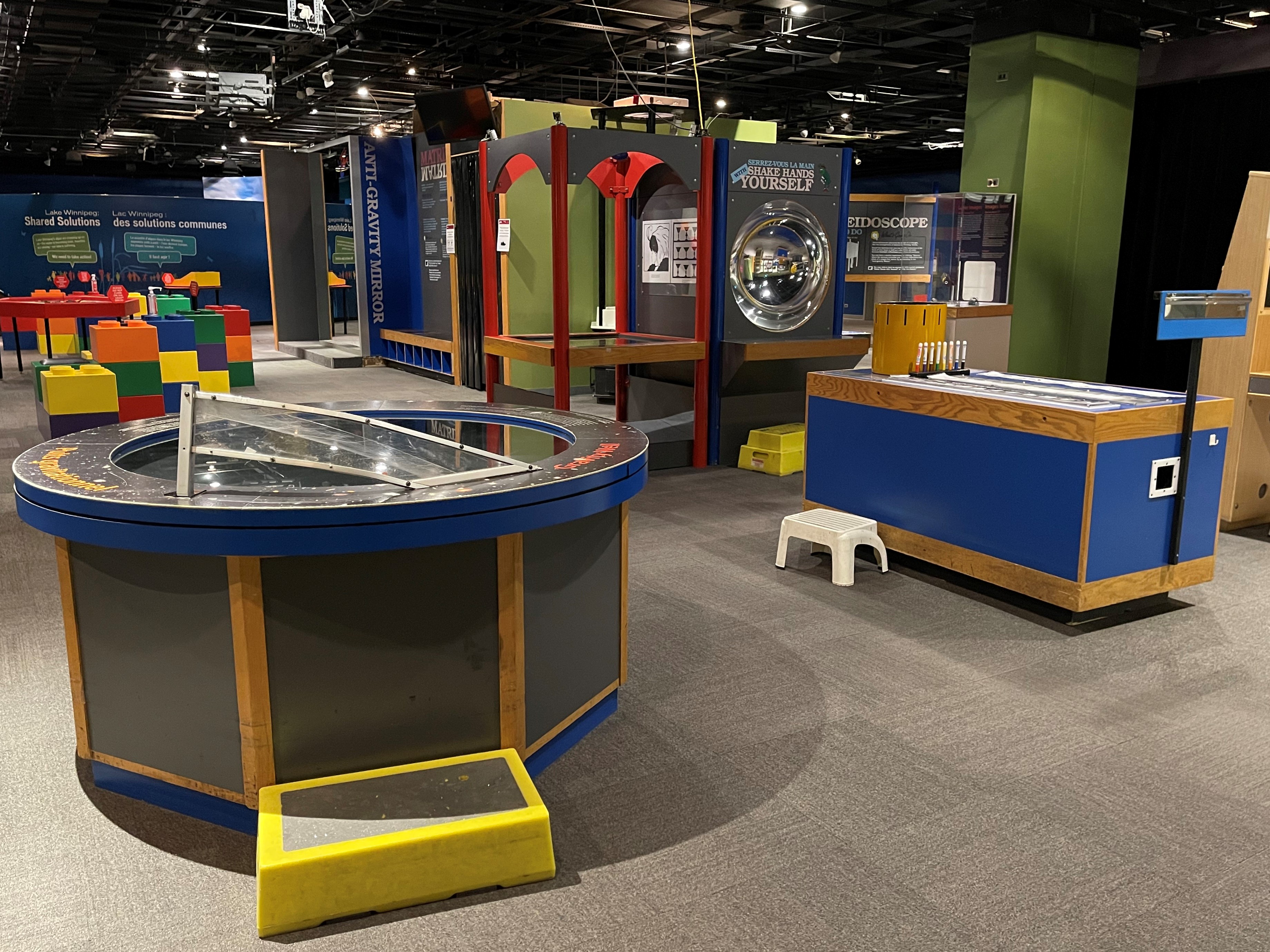
The Science Gallery at the Manitoba Museum. November 2021.

The Science Gallery is an interactive exhibition space where visitors explore science and technology through hands-on exhibits and activities. Originally opened as the Touch the Universe Gallery, the space was renewed as the Science Gallery in 2008.

In 2014, the gallery added the more than CA$1 million Lake Winnipeg: Shared Solutions exhibit. Through an interactive computer simulation, visitors explore issues affecting the Lake Winnipeg watershed by balancing land use, agriculture, industry and conservation. The exhibit was developed with support from government agencies, environmental organizations and private partners.

In 2016, the gallery added two permanent exhibits: Brickyard: Build with LEGO Bricks, where visitors experiment with structural design using LEGO bricks, and Engineered for Speed Race Track, where visitors design, build and test model race cars.

== Collections ==
The Manitoba Museum cares for more than 2.9 million artifacts and natural history specimens documenting the human and natural history of Manitoba. The collections support exhibitions, research, conservation, education and public programs, and continue to grow through donations, archaeological investigations, scientific fieldwork and acquisitions.

The collections include archaeology, ethnology, history, anthropology, zoology, botany, palaeontology and geology, as well as archival records, photographs and works of art documenting the province's cultural and natural heritage.

=== Hudson's Bay Company Museum Collection ===
The Manitoba Museum is the permanent home of the Hudson's Bay Company Museum Collection, one of the world's largest collections relating to the history of the fur trade and the Hudson's Bay Company in North America. In 1994, the company transferred its historic collection to the museum, together with an endowment to support its care. The transfer was the largest corporate donation in the museum's history.

The Hudson's Bay Company began building the collection in the early 20th century to preserve artifacts, documents, natural history specimens and visual material relating to its activities in North America. On 2 May 1920, during celebrations marking the 250th anniversary of the company's Royal Charter, former Hudson's Bay Company district manager Francis David Wilson was appointed to collect historical objects, records and souvenirs for a museum.

According to the museum, about half of the holdings originated in First Nations, Métis, and Inuit communities through purchases, trade, ceremonial gift exchange and donations. Additional material was assembled by the company and by its employees, many of whom accumulated private collections during their careers.

Parts of the holdings were first exhibited at the company's Main Street store in Winnipeg in 1922 before moving to larger quarters on Portage Avenue in 1926. Following the 1994 transfer, the museum completed a new collections wing and research facility in 1998. The Hudson's Bay Company Gallery opened to the public on 2 May 2000.

In 2025, the museum also became one of four Canadian institutions to share responsibility for the 1670 Hudson's Bay Company Royal Charter, which granted the company exclusive trading rights over the Hudson Bay watershed.

== Planetarium ==
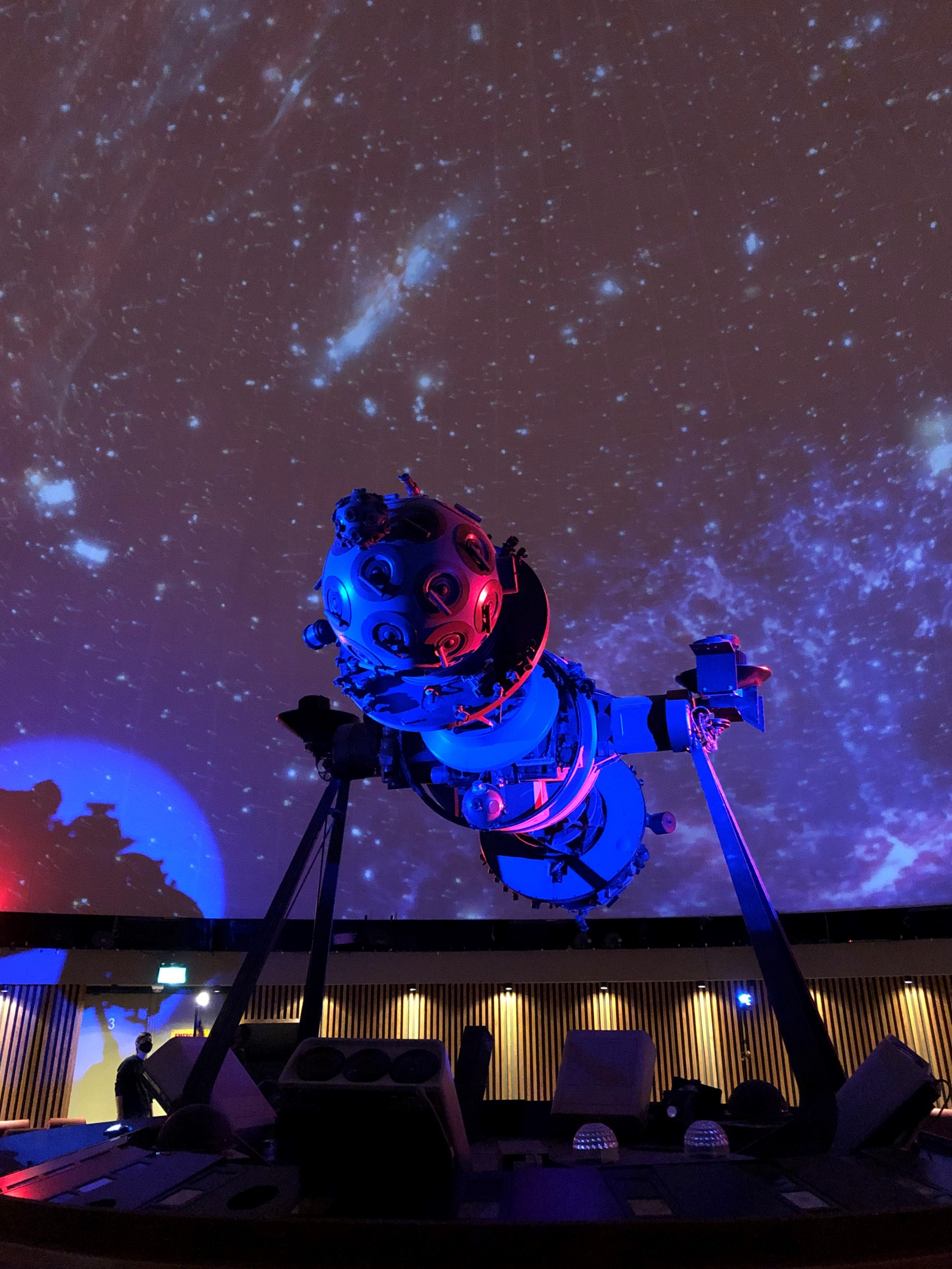
The Manitoba Museum Planetarium theatre.

The Manitoba Museum Planetarium opened on 15 May 1968. The planetarium's live programming combine pre-recorded visual sequences of the sky and space, with commentary and question-and-answer segments from a show presenter. Full dome shows also run with offerings for family audiences, and are often accompanied by a live show segment before or after the film.

In 2012, the Manitoba Museum became the first planetarium in Canada to offer visitors the Digistar® 5 All-Dome digital projection technology. This technology makes it possible to show the sky as it would look from anywhere on Earth, or even in the galaxy, at any point in history, or in the future. Though no longer in regular use, the original Zeiss optical-mechanical star projector (colloquially known as 'Marvin') remains a beloved feature of the planetarium theatre.

== Affiliations ==
The museum's property is owned by the Manitoba Centennial Centre, who are also in charge of cleaning the museum.

The Manitoba Museum is affiliated with Canadian Museums Association, Canadian Heritage Information Network, the Canadian Association of Science Centres, and Virtual Museum of Canada.

The Institute for Stained Glass in Canada has documented the stained glass at the museum.

Since 2023, the museum has partnered with Winnipeg Pro Wrestling for an annual show which has attracted international talent such as Mercedes Mone, Evil Uno, members of the Bullet Club stable, and more.

== Virtual programming ==
Since 2020, as result of COVID-19 regulations in Manitoba, the Manitoba Museum has been offering virtual tours and programming, such as the weekly 'DOME@HOME' program with Planetarium Astronomer Scott Young, which takes place on Thursday evenings at 7 pm.
