= Tracy Dahl =

Canadian coloratura soprano

Tracy Elizabeth Dahl (born 13 November 1961) is a Canadian coloratura soprano who has performed in opera houses and on concert stages around the world. Alongside her performing career, Dahl teaches voice at the University of Manitoba Desautels Faculty of Music, and conducts masterclasses and workshops across North America. She lives in Winnipeg, Manitoba with her husband and two children.

== Career ==
=== Early years ===
Born in Winnipeg, Dahl began voice lessons at 12, and seemed destined for a career in musical theatre. In 1979 and 1980, she studied drama and musical theatre at the Banff Centre. After a successful debut as Barbarina in Manitoba Opera's 1982 production of Mozart's Le Nozze di Figaro, Dahl changed her focus to opera. In 1983, she studied opera at the Banff Centre, and the Banff Academy of Singing in 1984 under the guidance of Mary Morrison and Martin Isepp. In 1985, she participated in San Francisco Opera's Merola Opera Program, and soon began a career in opera.

=== Operatic stage ===
In 1987, Dahl made her European debut at Aix-en-Provence, performing the role of Blondchen in Mozart's Die Entführung aus dem Serail. Also in 1987, she made her American opera debut in The Tales of Hoffmann at the San Francisco Opera, singing the role of Olympia opposite Plácido Domingo. In 1991, in the place of an indisposed singer, she sang the role of Adele in Johann Strauss Jr.'s Die Fledermaus at the Metropolitan Opera. She also performed as Florestine in the premiere of John Corigliano's Ghosts of Versailles at the Metropolitan Opera in 1991, and again in 1995.

Dahl has sung in opera houses throughout North America, including the Los Angeles Music Center Opera, Houston Grand Opera, Dallas Opera, Colorado Symphony, Portland Opera, and Canadian Opera Company, and has performed over 25 roles. In 2006, she made her La Scala debut as Zerbinetta in Ariadne auf Naxos.

=== Concert stage ===
Dahl has appeared in concert with all the major orchestras across Canada, as well as with the Philadelphia Orchestra, San Francisco Symphony, St. Louis Symphony, and Atlanta Symphony Orchestra. She performed a New Year's Eve gala with the Tonhalle Orchester Zürich under David Zinman, and made her United Kingdom debut with the Royal Scottish National Orchestra. Dahl debuted at Carnegie Hall in the world premiere of David Del Tredici's Child Alice in 1986, and performed under the baton of maestro Leonard Slatkin at the Hollywood Bowl.

Dahl made her Australian concert debut in 2011, performing with the Melbourne Symphony Orchestra. The following year, she performed for the first time with the Sydney Symphony Orchestra in "A Gershwin Tribute".

== Discography ==
- Glitter and Be Gay with the Calgary Philharmonic (CBC)
- Winter Poems: Music of Glenn Buhr (CBC)
- Rhymes, Reveries, Rimes (CBC)
- A Disney Spectacular with the Cincinnati Pops (Telarc)
- A Vienna fest with the Cincinnati Pops directed by Erich Kunzel (Telarc)
- A Gilbert and Sullivan Gala with the Winnipeg Symphony Orchestra (CBC)
- Love Walked In, a Gershwin collection with the Bramwell Tovey Trio (Red Phone Box Company)

== Awards ==
In 2009, Dahl was awarded the Ruby Baton by Opera Canada for her outstanding achievements on stage. In 2012, she received the Winnipeg Symphony Orchestra's Golden Baton Award for her artistic achievements. Dahl was named to the Order of Canada in January 2018. In 2026, she was appointed to the Order of Manitoba, the province's highest honour.
