= Judith Forst =

Canadian mezzo-soprano

- Born: Judith Doris Lumb; November 7, 1943 (age 81); New Westminster, British Columbia
- Occupations: Opera singer (mezzo-soprano); Voice teacher
- Years active: 1968 –
- Awards: Order of Canada; Order of British Columbia

Judith Doris Forst (née Lumb) OC OBC (born November 7, 1943) is a Canadian mezzo-soprano.

Born in New Westminster, British Columbia, she received a Bachelor of Music from the University of British Columbia in 1964. She is the sister-in-law of long time Vancouver radio personality Brian (Frosty) Forst. In 1968 she won the Metropolitan Opera National Council Auditions.

Forst made her debut at the Metropolitan Opera on September 19, 1968, at the age of 24 in the small role of the Page in Rigoletto. Other Met roles include (in chronological order) Tebaldo in Verdi's Don Carlo, Stéphano in Gounod's Roméo et Juliette, Mercédès in Bizet's Carmen, Teresa in Bellini's La sonnambula, Siebel in Gounod's Faust, Kate Pinkerton in Puccini's Madama Butterfly, Lola in Mascagni's Cavalleria rusticana, Bersi in Umberto Giordano's Andrea Chénier, Estrella in Offenbach's La Périchole, Preziosilla in La forza del destino, Hänsel in Hänsel und Gretel, Flora in La traviata, Giulietta in Les contes d'Hoffman, Donna Elvira in Don Giovanni, Mère Marie in Poulenc's Dialogues of the Carmelites, Kabanicha in Janáček's Káťa Kabanová, Adelaide in Arabella, The Witch in Hänsel und Gretel, and Kostelnicka in Jenůfa.

In 1991, she was made an Officer of the Order of Canada. In 2001, she was awarded the Order of British Columbia.
