= George Izenour =

American designer and innovator (1912–2007)

George Charles Izenour
- Born: July 24, 1912; New Brighton, Pennsylvania
- Died: March 24, 2007 (aged 94); Philadelphia, Pennsylvania
- Occupation: Theatrical designer
- Children: Steven Izenour (son)

George Charles Izenour (pronounced I-zen-our), MPhys, AIEEE (July 24, 1912 – March 24, 2007) was an American designer and leading innovator in the field of theatrical design and technology, as well as an author and educator. He taught at Yale University from 1940 to 1977 (with time during World War II working on anti-submarine programs). In 1959 he established a consulting firm for theater design and acoustics.

He is best known for creating one of the first electronic theatre lighting dimming systems. Over the course of his career, he invented and developed multiple technologies that are now part of the core of modern theatrical productions, and held numerous patents for his inventions.

== Biography ==
=== Early life and education ===
George Izenour was born in 1912 in New Brighton, Pennsylvania; his family moved to Ambridge in 1917. In 1918 Izenour's father moved the family to Mansfield, Ohio. The boy had a condition known as keratoconus, a non-spherical deformation of the cornea of the eye, and he needed extra help from his parents in his early years of education. His mother taught him English and Latin, and his father history and mathematics. George began formal schooling at the age of six in Mansfield.

While at Mansfield Senior High School, Izenour became involved in the school theater program and appeared in all the plays. He also painted scenery for the productions and became increasingly interested in the technical aspects of theatre.

Izenour attended Wittenberg College in Springfield, Ohio. He obtained a master's degree in physics. His thesis was the embodiment of what would later become the first electronic theatre lighting dimming system.

Izenour married Hildegard Hilt, a classmate from Wittenberg, after graduation. The young couple moved to San Francisco, California.

=== Work ===
Shortly after moving to San Francisco, Izenour met Hallie Flanagan, the national director of the Federal Theatre Project. Started by the President Franklin D. Roosevelt administration during the Great Depression, this program was an effort to support productions in order to employ actors, playwrights, and technical staff to maintain theater during the hard times. Izenour eventually advanced to become the lighting director of the project. He designed the theatre built for the 1939 Golden Gate International Exposition in San Francisco.

Izenour was made a Fellow of the Rockefeller Foundation on July 10, 1939. This was 10 days after the House Un-American Activities Committee declared all of the members of the Federal Theater to be Communists, and essentially shutting down the program of the Federal Theater. With his Rockefeller grant, Izenour gained a position at Yale University. He had a mandate to establish a laboratory dedicated to the advancement of theatre technology.

=== World War II ===
During World War II, Izenour worked on antisubmarine warfare and countermeasures for proximity fuses at a government lab in Long Island, New York.

He and Hildegard had a son, Steven Izenour, born in New Haven in July 1940; he later became a world-renowned architect and artist.

=== Yale ===
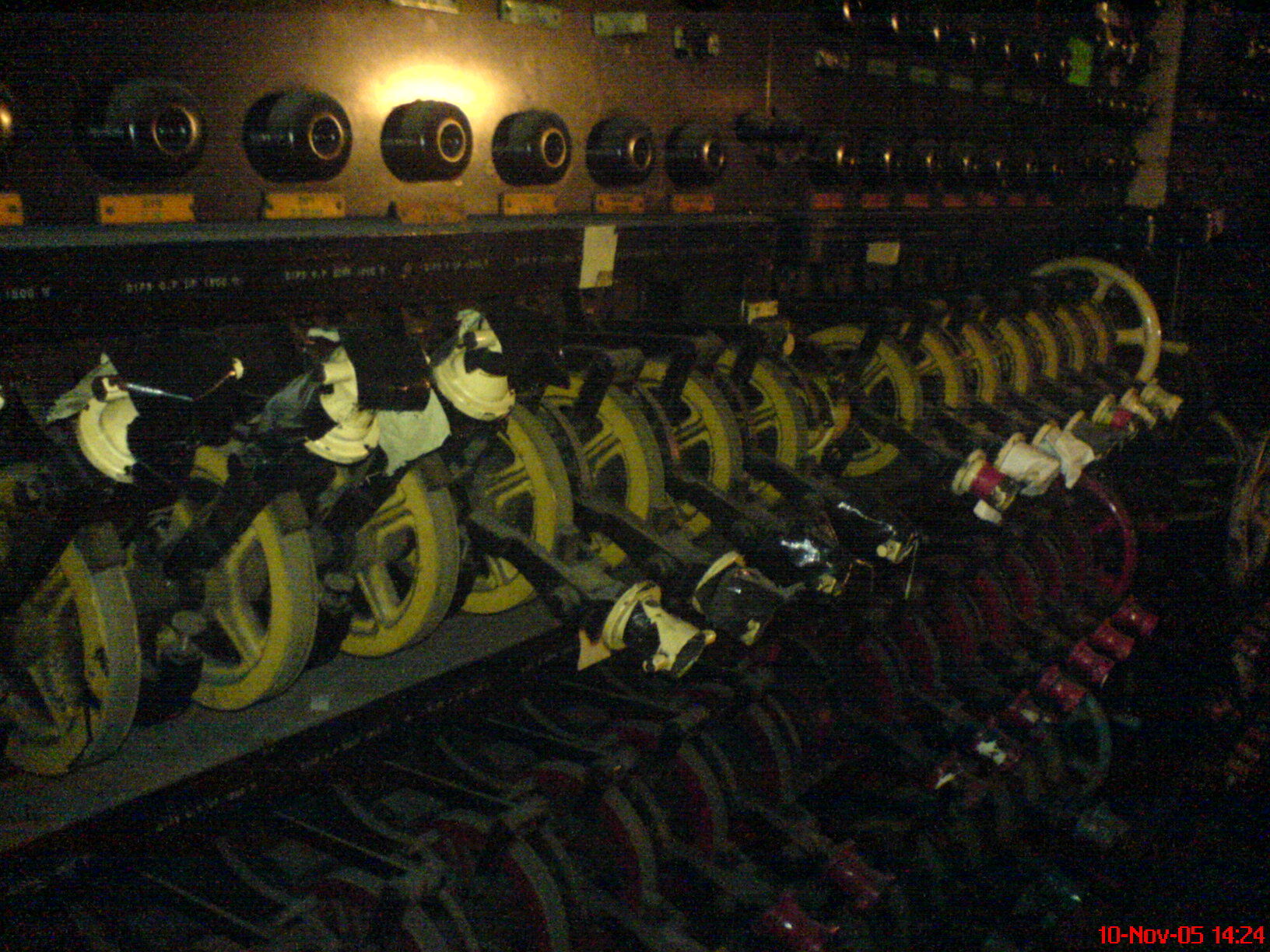
Resistance dimmer lighting control.

After the war Izenour returned to Yale. He developed the Electro-Mechanical Laboratory in an abandoned squash court at the Yale School of Drama Annex, under the general direction of Stanley McCandless. He built and installed several dimming systems in that space. Century Lighting became interested in the system; however, Izenour refused to sell the patents he had acquired. Century took a license to produce the dimming systems, which became known as the Century-Izenour System.

Prior to Izenour's development of his control system, adjusting theatrical lighting had to be done manually through bulky control panels located on-stage. For large, complex productions, several people would generally be required to operate these control panels. The Century-Izenour control system allowed a single operator, located in the house, to control all of the stage lighting remotely.

=== Theatre design ===
Izenour was contacted for a formal consultation by McGeorge Bundy, then Dean of the College of Arts and Sciences at Harvard University. Bundy was building a new theatre in Cambridge, later known as the Loeb Drama Center. It was to be based on a design program from Archibald MacLeish. MacLeish wanted the theatre to be able to convert from proscenium to thrust because he believed these were the two great forms of theatre in Western culture.

Izenour designed a theater that could be converted from one stage type to the other by a process, part manual and part electronic, that took about 15 minutes. This convertible design was celebrated in the architectural world and became known as an Izenour theatre. Today Izenour theatres have been built across the United States, as well as in Canada, Venezuela, and Israel. No Broadway theatres adopted such a program. “Broadway is not for me,” he said in a 1959 interview with The New York Times. “I am a radical to those real estate operators.”

Izenour used the positive renown he gained from this project to establish George C. Izenour Associates as a theatre design and acoustical consulting firm. Through his consultancy firm, Izenour advised such prestigious clients as the Metropolitan Opera Company and the Juilliard School of Music on technical matters. In addition, he helped to design more than 100 theatres across the country.

“George really was the father of modern theatre consulting and design,” remembers Steve Pollock. “Some of his initial project work, such as the Krannert Center for the Performing Arts at the University of Illinois, relied on a number of individual spaces to satisfy a broad menu, whether it be a great hall, an amphitheatre, a studio theatre, and so on. Over time, George began to roll a lot of these functions into what was referred to as the multi-use theatre, and that's really George’s invention, wherein technology was used to vary acoustics, move ceilings, to do all of these things with moving architecture, changing the physicality of the space itself.”—Yale School of Drama Alumni Magazine, 2010–11

In 1977 Izenour retired from Yale from his positions both as professor emeritus of theatre design and technology and director emeritus of the electro-mechanical laboratory of the Yale University School of Drama. He continued his consulting business in a converted oyster shack next to his home at Stony Creek, Connecticut, where he overlooked the Thimble Islands.

His son, architect Steven Izenour, had designed the house. He won both national recognition for it by the American Institute of Architects and international acclaim in an exhibit at the Pompidou Center in Paris. The living room was lead lined, in order to be acoustically separate from the rest of the house. It was designed in section to emulate the plan acoustics of Carnegie Hall. During construction, Izenour fired a starter's pistol every day in the living room to record the reverberation and adjust the baffles. He enjoyed playing a concert recording of the 1812 Overture at volume for visitors. The Juilliard String Quartet said Izenour's living room was one of their favorite recording spaces. Izenour lived there until his wife's death in 2002.

=== Later years and death ===
After that, Izenour moved to Cathedral Village in Philadelphia. He continued to work on theatre design projects until his death in 2007.

== Technology ==
George Izenour is credited with over 27 patents for various technologies and design improvements. His developments have significantly affected the art of stagecraft and theatre in general.

Some of his many contributions to theatre technology include:

- Patent #2,942,879 Scenery Handling Apparatus a patent for a remotely operated, motor-controlled fly system. This patent is the precursor to all modern computer-controlled scenery systems.
- Patent #2,463,463 Lighting Control Circuits, perhaps Izenour's best-known invention, is a patent for a compact, remote-operation system for theatrical and television lighting dimming systems. This patent is the basis for all modern lighting control consoles.
- Izenour also developed such varied technologies as articulated acoustical sub-structures, and assorted analogue and digital control systems.
- He created the inverse polarized rectifier circuit for dimming and switching stage lighting, the first of its kind. The invention, using thyratrons, significantly reduced the size of dimming systems used in theatres.

Pennsylvania State University houses a collection of Izenour's original prototypes for lighting control and automated fixtures. It also holds a collection of his linen and vellum drawings.

== Bibliography ==
Izenour wrote technical articles for many professional journals, wrote the section on theatre design for the 1974 edition of Encyclopædia Britannica, and contributed to the McGraw-Hill Dictionary of Architecture and Construction.

He wrote three books:

- Theater Design, Yale University Press, 1977, revised 1997 ISBN 978-0-300-06775-0
- Theater Technology, Yale University Press, 1988, revised 1997 ISBN 978-0-300-06766-8
- Roofed Theaters of Classical Antiquity, Yale University Press, 1992 ISBN 978-0-300-04685-4

== Honors and awards ==
Izenour held fellowships from the Rockefeller Foundation, the Ford Foundation and the John Simon Guggenheim Memorial Foundation. He was appointed a Benjamin Franklin Fellow of the Royal Society.

He was a member of the American Association for the Advancement of Science, American Institute of Electrical and Electronics Engineers, Acoustical Society of America, and the National Council of Acoustical Consultants.

Izenour shared the Rodgers and Hammerstein Prize in 1960. He received the USITT Award from the United States Institute for Theatre Technology in 1975, The George Freely Award from the Theatre Library Association in 1977, and the Distinguished Service Award from the American Theatre Association in 1978.

In 2004, Izenour was presented with the Wally Russell Lifetime Achievement Award. The "Wally" Award was established in 1992 in memory of Wally Russell. Each year, the "Wally" honors one individual who exhibits a strong sense of leadership, a commitment to technological innovation, and a career of service to the lighting industry.
