= David Penner =

Canadian architect (1958–2020)

David Paul Penner
- Born: August 9, 1958; Winnipeg, Manitoba, Canada
- Died: January 7, 2020 (aged 61)
- Education: University of Manitoba (B.Env.D); University of Manitoba (M.Arch)
- Occupation: Architect
- Practice: David Penner Architect
- Buildings: Fountain Springs Housing; Windsor Park Library; Mere Hotel; Buhler Centre; Penner Residence
- Website: davidpennerarchitect.ca

David Paul Penner FRAIC (August 9, 1958 – January 7, 2020) was a Canadian architect from Osborne Village in Winnipeg, Manitoba. He attended the University of Manitoba where he received his Bachelor of Environment Studies in 1979 and Masters of Architecture in 1985. Penner was the founding principal of David Penner Architect (DPA). He became a Fellow of the RAIC in 2012, and was involved in several organizations outside his firm including Storefront Manitoba and the Prairie Design Awards Program. His best-known architectural works include Fountain Springs Housing, Buhler Center, Windsor Park Library, and Mere Hotel. Penner died from a heart attack on January 7, 2020.

== Design philosophy ==
David Penner was an architect with a strong dedication to improving the city through architecture and physical landscapes. He demonstrated his volunteerism though involvement in various initiatives to engage the public through design and architecture. Penner also worked towards rehabilitating Manitoba's major heritage landmarks, such as the Royal Manitoba Theatre Center, Carlton Building, Winnipeg Adult Education Centre, and St. John's Telephone Exchange. Penner believed that architecture is the core element that "embodies the DNA of a city and its citizens."

Penner experimented with various architectural styles throughout his career, ranging from postmodernism which can be found in his own residence built in 1993 to contemporary architecture. He started as an advocate for historical revivalism, learning from the books of Robert Venturi and Charles Moore which increased his passion for striking decoration and public interest. Penner also traveled around United States for a year to examine the works by Michael Graves, Venturi and other post-modern architects. His earlier works like Penner Residence (1993) and Wolfrom Structural Engineering Offices (1995) demonstrate his passion for post-modernist architecture. Penner's preference for bold yet simple elements can be found in the pure geometries of the steel pyramid studio in Penner Residence and the almost perfect cube massing, inspired by Le Corbusier, in the Taylor Residence (1999).

== Career ==
Before starting his own firm, David Penner developed his skills as an architect working at several Winnipeg firms. After finishing his graduate studies, he started his career in the Department of Indian and Northern Affairs, Engineering and Architecture Division for the Government of Canada from 1979 to 1980. He also worked with Smith Carter Partners, now known as Architecture 49 (1981–1982), James and Rollier (1983–1984), Calnitsky Henshka Associates (1985), and Stechesen Katz Architects (1986–1993).

Penner started his own practice, David Penner Architect (DPA), in 1993. At the time, Winnipeg was undergoing a large financial challenge due to frozen real estate prices and the Winnipeg Jets leaving the city. Therefore, Penner had to learn ways to design affordable architecture, which drove his works to be unconventional and creative with low construction costs. While he had one project located in Ontario, most of the firm's works were located in Winnipeg, Manitoba. DPA was a small firm, employing only few people at a time for maximized involvement in the projects. The office was initially located inside the stainless-steel pyramid in the backyard of Penner's house, which he designed himself. Penner's firm collaborated with several architectural firms and other architects, including h5 Architecture, Peter Sampson, Neil Minuk and DIN Projects. DPA specialized in cultural, commercial, institutional and residential work, working with individual clients as well as corporations. The firm designed several cottages and installations, as well as renovations and proposals for urban planning. Over the course of 17 years, DPA has won several regional awards for more than 16 projects.

== Other aspects of career ==
=== Storefront Manitoba ===
David Penner was one of the founders of Storefront Manitoba in 2011, a non-profit organization that advocates for architects, designers, engineers, and landscapers to raise awareness and appreciation of architecture, design and the built environment in Manitoba. He wanted the public to engage with architecture so as to understand the influence of design over development. Storefront MB is best known for hosting initiatives such as the annual Winnipeg Design Festival, Cool Gardens, Benchmark Design Contest, and TableFor1200. In the past, StorefrontMB has organized a Little Free Libraries design competition.

David Penner was the curator for TableFor1200 which was initiated in 2014 in collaboration with 5468796 Architecture Inc. The annual pop-up dining event takes place in Winnipeg's emerging design areas to stimulate conversations on architecture, design, and culinary arts. The project aims to "gain a deeper understanding of the catalysts that have built a strong commitment to architecture," according to 5468796 Architecture Inc. Penner was also the co-curator for Cool Gardens from 2013 to 2019. Storefront Manitoba is the publisher of books documenting regional work, including the MB ARCH book series, Re/Imagining Winnipeg, and River City 2050. David Penner edited Cool Gardens: A Collection of Temporary Installations, published by Storefront MB, which features the installations created in the first five years (2013–2019) of the competition. He also contributed to Re/imagining Winnipeg, where he proposed an idea to redesign downtown Winnipeg's street parking, as well as River City 2050 with his solutions to future urban design around level-controlled rivers.

=== Manitoba Association of Architects ===
David Penner was a member of the Manitoba Association of Architects (MAA), in which he served 10 years on the Council. Penner was a part of the Public Affairs Committee, in which he served three terms on the Executive Committee as Second Vice President and Treasurer during his tenure. In 2004, he co-founded the City of Winnipeg's Urban Design Advisory Committee. Penner also co-founded The Prairie Design Awards, a bi-annual program established in 2000 to recognize design excellence in architecture, interior design and landscape architecture in central Canada. This was done on behalf of Manitoba Association of Architects (MAA) in conjunction with the Alberta Association of Architects (AAA) and the Saskatchewan Association of Architects (SAA). He was a continuing chair since the founding date (2000–2020).

=== Jury works ===
Penner was one of the three jurors for the 51st Canadian Architect Award of Excellence in 2018. He also mentored many students as a guest critic and as a professor for the Faculty of Architecture in University of Manitoba, one of them being Sasa Radulovic of 5468796 Architects.

== Notable projects ==
=== Penner Residence (1993) ===
The Penner Residence best showcases Penner's appreciation for post-modernist architecture. Located on 120 Yale Avenue, Winnipeg, Penner designed it to be his personal residence. It adapted the Shingle-Style that was found in Winnipeg's neighbourhood at the time, creating a complex ensemble of prairie building inspired forms such as silos, barns, and greenhouses. The most notable feature of the project is the dramatic 500 square foot stainless steel-clad pyramid shaped studio derived from the primitive huts and tipis of Indigenous vernacular architecture. Penner Residence demonstrated his passion for processing ideas from the past, paying homage to forms and styles that are often forgotten. The Penner Residence won the Manitoba Wood Design Award of Merit and the Grand Prize in the Search for Living category of prizes at Western Living magazine.

=== Little Red Library (2014) ===
The Little Red Library was constructed for the Winnipeg Warming Huts Competition in 2014, and is one of the best-known installations by David Penner. For Penner, installation projects were an opportunity to break away from the constraints of his daily architectural works and release his design philosophies in a purer format. The Little Red Library successfully achieves his hopes of allowing the public to be intrigued by the bold structure, questioning the ideologies of architectures in the physical environment. It also participates in the Little Free Library movement. It won the Premier's Award of Excellence in 2015 and the Prairie Design Award in 2016, praised for its immersiveness and versatility as a warming hut, free library, art gallery and a public landmark. The installation is a steel-framed cube wrapped with a translucent red welding curtain that is thermally stretched to enclose the structures. First erected on the frozen Assiniboine River, the iconic installation currently roams around Winnipeg in the warmer seasons and is open to the public. In the summer of 2014, the installation was renamed to become the Little Red Art Gallery, and hosted four art shows across from Peanut Park in Winnipeg. It can be found on Wellington Crescent today.

=== Windsor Park Library (2018) ===
Designed with h5 architecture in Winnipeg, Windsor Park Library is one of the most recent works completed by David Penner. Located on Archibald Street, it was part of the Winnipeg Public Library's redevelopment strategy, replacing the old Windsor Park Library (1961) on Cottonwood Road. Penner designed the library to be fully accessible and barrier-free by locating all programs in a single storey building. The odd-shaped site is accommodated with the 30/60 triangular geometry of the plan. The facade is mostly composed of full-storey height curtain wall glass that allow views into the surrounding landscape. Due to limited budget, Penner and h5 architecture used off-the-shelf cladding with standard sections. A mosaic mural by local artist, Simon Hughes, can be found inside. The library meets LEED silver requirements, with hollow-core slabs, outer wall integrated heating systems, automated HVAC and lighting, and daylight responsive blinds. Windsor Park Library was awarded the Judge's Choice Award of Excellence by Manitoba Masonry in 2018.

=== Other notable projects ===
- Buhler Centre, Winnipeg, Manitoba, 2010
- Mere Hotel, Winnipeg, Manitoba, 2014
- Fountain Springs Housing, Winnipeg, Manitoba, 2016

== Awards and honours ==
Over the course of his career, David Penner received several awards for his projects within the city of Winnipeg. In 2012, he was bestowed Fellowship in the Royal Architectural Institute of Canada (RAIC) for his valuable contributions to the community and the profession of architecture. He posthumously received a Distinguished Service Award from Heritage Winnipeg in February 2020.

- 2018 – Prairie Design Award of Excellence, Fountain Springs Housing
- 2018 – Manitoba Masonry Judge's Choice Award of Excellence, Windsor Park Library
- 2016 – Prairie Design Award – Little Red Library
- 2016 – Prairie Design Award of Excellence, Mere Hotel
- 2015 – Premier's Award of Excellence, Little Red Library
- 2013 – Grand Prize Winner, CommerceDesignWinnipeg, Stella's @ Plug In
- 2010 – Prairie Design Award of Excellence, Corogami Hut
- 2008 – Prairie Design Award of Excellence, Penner Cottage
- 2006 – Masonry Design Award of Excellence, Winnipeg Adult Education Centre
- 2005 – Prairie Design Award of Excellence, Manitoba Electrical Museum
- 2004 – Heritage Winnipeg Preservation Award for Excellence, Manitoba Theatre Centre
- 2004 – Heritage Winnipeg Preservation Award for Excellence, Carlton Building
- 2002 – Western Living "Fits All" Category Winner, Taylor Residence
- 2001 – Manitoba Wood Design Award, Tritt Residence
- 2001 – Manitoba Wood Design Award of Merit, 120 Yale Avenue (Penner Residence/Studio)
- 2000 – Prairie Design Award of Excellence, Wolfrom Engineering Offices
- 2000 – MMCA Masonry Design Award of Excellence, Bomber Store
- 1996 – Heritage Winnipeg Preservation Award for Excellence, St. Johns Telephone Exchange Conversion
- 1994 – Western Living! Search for Style Grand Prize, 120 Yale Avenue

== Publications and exhibitions ==
- 2004 – Living Spaces: 21 Contemoirary Canadian Homes, exhibition first hosted at Cambridge Galleries curated by John Ota, Christine Macy, Marco Polo and David Theodore featuring 21 Canadian homes.
- 2016 – Re/Imagining Winnipeg 2nd Edition, edited by Lauwrence Bird and Sharon Wohl
- 2017 – Cool Gardens: A Collection of Temporary Installations
- 2018 – River City 2050, edited by Eduard Epp
