= 62M Condominium =

Condo building in Winnipeg, Manitoba, Canada

Coordinates: 49.90232°N 97.12572°W

62M

General information
- Location: 62 MacDonald Ave; Winnipeg, Manitoba, Canada, Winnipeg, Canada
- Completed: 2018

Design and construction
- Architecture firm: 5468796 Architecture

Other information
- Number of units: 41

62M is a 41-unit condominium building in Winnipeg, Manitoba, Canada, built by 5468796 Architecture.

Named after its street address, 62 MacDonald Avenue, the three-storey, circular structure sits on 12-metre (39 ft) high concrete columns and hovers next to the Disraeli Freeway at the edge of downtown Winnipeg and the Red River.

Completed in 2018, the building has 40 identical trapezoid units and a glass penthouse on top of the structural core, each unit starts at approximately 3 m (10 ft) wide around the entrance (located adjacent to the structural core) and 6 m (20 ft) towards the exterior, featuring 6-meter-tall windows.

Due to the building's circular shape that rise over the city skyline, the development has been unofficially nicknamed the "UFO" and the "flying saucer" by locals.

== Location ==
Located on the edge of downtown Winnipeg and the Red River, the building is situated between the Disraeli Freeway and the back of neighbouring properties.

The building site—a leftover bit of industrial ground next to the freeway—was originally considered an undesirable location to build because of its restricted views, industrial nature, and its isolated location with a lack of street frontage. To overcome this, 5468796 partners Johanna Hurme, Sasa Radulovic, and Colin Neufeld came up with the idea of raising the building off of the ground so that it was higher than the surrounding buildings.

After raising it, their budget became much more restricted. To help with cost efficiency, they gave the building a circular form as it could encompass the same area using 30% less building materials than a rectangular form.

== Architecture ==
=== Concept ===
Project 62M can be considered as a project based on redefining budget prioritization during the design process. This would be achieved through the use of “cheaper alternatives” such as material, site location, decoration, etc.

Quoting the architect, "This leads to an innate frugality of our interventions, shaving off the excess in order to create projects that do not depend on extraneous or decorative elements."

=== Design process ===
The shape of the building originated from addressing two different design challenges: site location and budget size. The site's location is between industrial buildings and the base of an elevated freeway, limiting the building view and free space.

The first step to address the site location was by elevating the building to provide daylight access and a better view of the city. However, this solution created a conflict with the budget creating the second challenge during the design process. The designers explored different solutions to keep the new design within the budget. This solution was the circular shape that would use "30 per cent less exterior envelope than rectilinear shapes would need." This solution didn't just solve the cost efficiency but also provided a panoramic view through six meters of floor-to-ceiling glass.

However, to make this work, it needed to be discussed with traders and contractors involved in the project to give a green light into building it. After the designer brought to light that it shouldn't be any different from making it in the ground, the idea of prefabrication was the best option for a budget-friendly construction.

Forty identical pie-shaped units were prefabricated by the contractors to be put together at the top of a concrete core. Inside this concrete core was found the staircase and elevator to the building.

=== Materials ===
The material palette of the building consists of raw concrete (left raw to minimize maintenance costs), weathering steel, wood, and glass. The materials used during the design and construction of Project 62M are:

Materials
Cast-in-place concrete
Weathering steel
Weathering glass

These rustic materials are what give a contrast between the interior against the exterior facades and were also a more cost efficient option.

=== Structure objective ===
The circular form of the 62M structure is cost-effective by reducing the elevation cost of the building and "providing a narrow circumference/area dedicated to communal corridors and the widest possible perimeter for suite windows in order to optimize construction costs."

Furthermore, the architects decided that using a pre-fabricated structure would be the best budget-friendly solution to reduce construction time. The raw touches of the pre-fabricated building would be used as part of the interior decoration to save even more in future maintenance costs that the building would end up needing (aside from simplifying the construction process).

=== Construction ===
The building is set upon twenty 11-meter (35 ft) tall precast concrete columns, each placed between radially arranged parking spots underneath the building. The center of the building is constructed using cast in place concrete that houses stairs, an elevator, and a maintenance shaft; this is considered the structural core of the building. The circular form of the building was designed to offset the costs of having the building raised, the building could be built with 30 percent less materials than if it were a square or rectangle.

The building has 40 identical trapezoid units and a glass penthouse on top of the structural core, each unit starts at approximately 10 feet wide around the entrance (located adjacent to the structural core) and 20 feet wide towards the exterior featuring 6-meter-tall (20 ft) windows. The units are arranged with the utility areas (such as laundry, maintenance, bathroom, and kitchen) located closest to the entrance. While the core and the open living areas (such as bedroom, living room, and dining room) are located nearest to the window to best utilize the 360 degree window perimeter of the building.

Each unit is approximately 610 square feet (57 square meters), and has a narrow perimeter dedicated to communal corridors and a larger perimeter dedicated to windows. Each of the units was built offsite as a prefabricated wall and floor sections each in the trapezoidal shape of the apartment it would be; the window system was also prefabricated and developed offsite.

The building is divided into units for sale and units for rent; units for sale are approximately $200,000 to $260,000 depending on the view, and units for rent are approximately $1,150 to $1,600 depending on the furnishings and the view.

== Bibliography ==
- 5468796 Architecture. 2018 December 4. "A decade of Housing by 5468796 Architecture." Canadian Architect.
- Bellamy, Brent. 2019 February 25. "A UFO-Shaped Condo Building Alights on Winnipeg’s Skyline." Azure Magazine.
- Boddy, Trevor. 2017 March 9. "62M Condominium Apartments in Canada by 5468796 Architecture." The Architectural Review.
- Furuto, Allison. "Flying Saucer’ Condominium Proposal/ 5468796 Architecture." ArchDaily. Last Accessed February 1, 2022.
- Gillmor, Alison. 2021 December 1. "Rooms with a view." Winnipeg Free Press.
- Novakovic, Stefan, Kendra Jackson, Evan Pavka, and Danny Sinopoli, et al. 2019 December 18. "The 10 Projects that Defined a Decade of Canadian Architecture." Azure Magazine.
- Taylor, Kelly. 2018 January 29. "Unique structure presents design challenges." Winnipeg Free Press.
- van Es, Karl. 2021 May 4. "5468796 Architecture create residential building that hovers over the Winnipeg skyline." Avontuura.
