= King Square Shopping Mall =

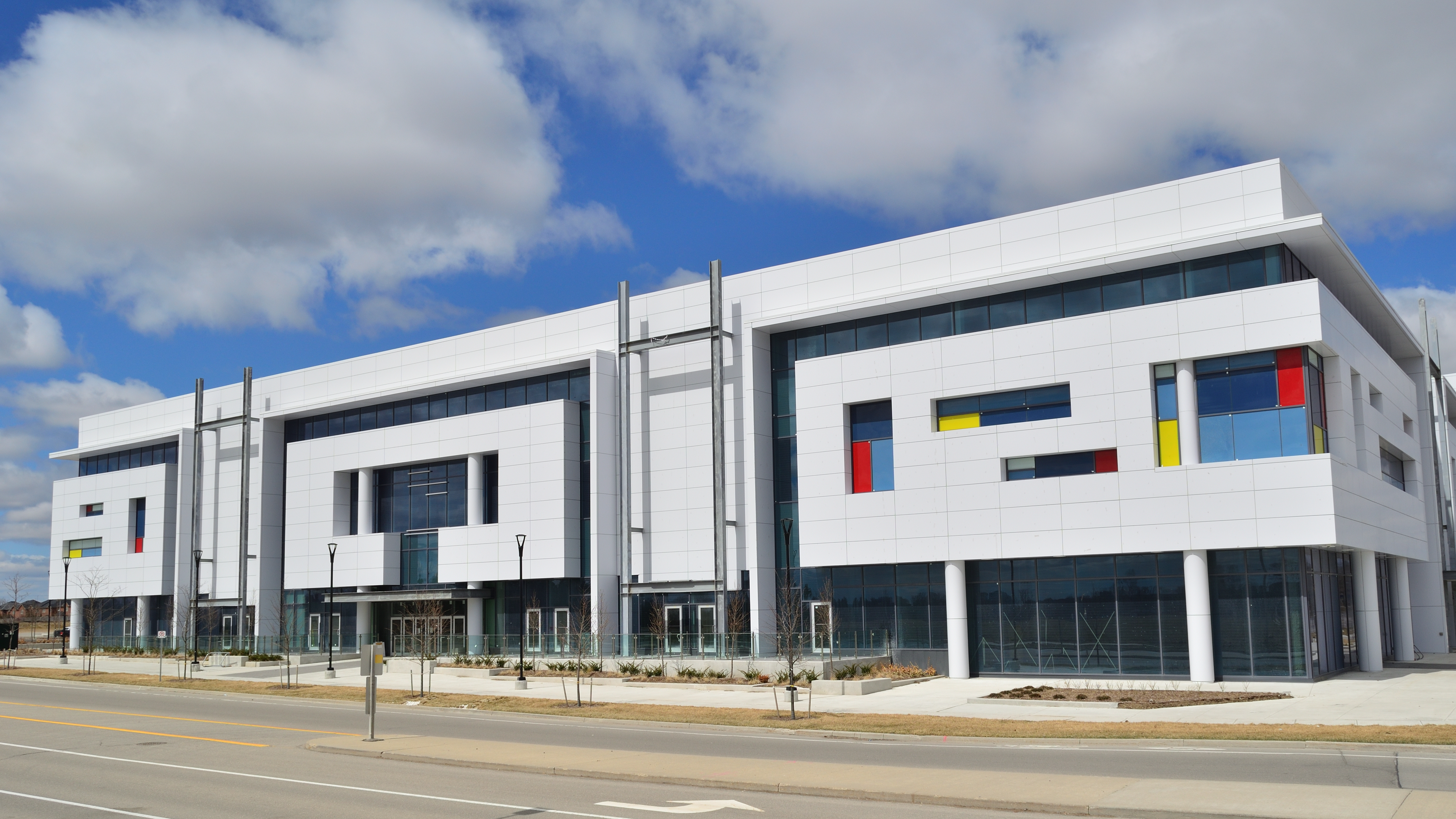
- King Square Shopping Mall (south entrance)
- Location: Markham, Ontario, Canada
- Coordinates: 43.8701°N 79.3654°W
- Address: 9390 Woodbine Avenue
- Opened: 2019
- Developer: 王府井有限公 King Square Ltd.
- Manager: 王府井有限公 King Square Ltd.
- Owner: 王府井有限公 King Square Ltd.
- Num. of stores: 560
- Floor area: 340,000 sq ft (32,000 m^{2})
- Floors: 3
- Parking: 897
- Website: kingsquare.ca

King Square Mall (王府井) is a Chinese commercial center located in Markham, Ontario, Canada. It is located at the edge of a residential area and northwest of 16th Avenue and Woodbine Avenue. Opened in 2019, it is currently one of the largest Asian shopping malls in North America, having a square footage of over 340,000.

== History ==
The development of King Square began as an initiative to cater to the growing Asian demographic in the region, particularly in Markham and the adjacent Richmond Hill. The site was initially acquired by King Square Ltd. in partnership with Fortress Real Developments around 2010, with construction officially starting in 2013. Although the mall was initially envisioned to span nearly 1,000,000 square feet and house over 1,000 retail units, various factors led to a scaled-back project that ultimately resulted in its current size.

While retail units were being presold and marketed for fall 2015 opening,, the mall opened in 2019 and was named after the world-famous merchandise King Square Street in Beijing.

Following its opening, the mall encountered substantial financial difficulties, culminating in a receivership initiated in December 2020. The structure of the receivership stems from a loan agreement that originally amounted to $50 million, which accumulated to over $82 million due to default on payments. This financial strain has led to ongoing efforts by the appointed receiver to liquidate various retail units within the mall. Approximately 150 out of 560 commercial units remain available for lease, with efforts to attract new tenants actively in progress. Plans for further development on adjacent properties were anticipated in 2024, with proposals for a hotel and residential spaces aimed at enhancing the area's community structure.

In 2024 King Square was placed into receivership.

== Design and facilities ==
King Square Mall features an architectural style that reflects Asian cultural themes. The mall hosts a variety of retailers, including an Asian-themed supermarket, a food court, full-service restaurants, and numerous retail shops. It has two levels of underground parking, totaling 897 spots. In addition to retail services, King Square includes various community amenities such as a medical center, pharmacy, and community gathering spaces.
