= Vince Leah =

Canadian journalist, writer and sports administrator (1913–1993)

Vince Leah CM
- Born: November 29, 1913; Winnipeg, Manitoba, Canada
- Died: August 9, 1993 (aged 79); Winnipeg, Manitoba, Canada
- Occupations: Journalist and writer
- Known for: The Winnipeg Tribune; Winnipeg Free Press
- Awards: Manitoba Sports Hall of Fame; Manitoba Hockey Hall of Fame
- Honours: Vince Leah Trophy

Vincent Leah CM (November 29, 1913 – August 9, 1993) was a Canadian journalist, writer and sports administrator. He wrote for The Winnipeg Tribune from 1930 to 1980, and was credited with giving the Winnipeg Blue Bombers their team's name. He established youth sports programs in Winnipeg for baseball, basketball, football, lacrosse, ice hockey, and soccer; and brought Little League Baseball to Canada. The Excelsior Hockey Club he founded in 1934, won thirteen provincial championships and produced forty professional hockey players. He was widely known as "Uncle Vince", authored eight books on history and sports, and was a freelancer for the Winnipeg Free Press from 1980 to 1993.

Leah was made a member of the Order of Canada, was inducted into the builder category of both the Manitoba Sports Hall of Fame and the Manitoba Hockey Hall of Fame, and is the namesake of the Vince Leah Trophy awarded to the rookie-of-the-year in the Manitoba Junior Hockey League. He was the first recipient of the Outstanding Volunteer in Sport Award given by the Manitoba Sports Federation, was recognized for his career in sports by the Heritage Winnipeg Corporation and the Canadian Amateur Sports Federation, and received an honorary doctorate from the University of Winnipeg.

== Early life ==
Vincent Leah was born in Winnipeg, Manitoba, on November 29, 1913. He was the youngest of two sons to Francis and Bridget Leah. Leah had English heritage from his father, and Irish heritage from his mother. He contracted polio at age eight, and attended Isaac Newton School and Ralph Brown School.

== Journalism and writing ==
Leah began working for The Winnipeg Tribune as a copy boy in 1930, and retired on May 30, 1980, after 50 years as a sports journalist for the newspaper. He was credited with giving the Winnipeg Blue Bombers their team's name. Journalist Jim Coleman wrote that Leah coined the name late in 1935, after Winnipeg became the first team from Western Canada team to win a Grey Cup, and that the name came at a time when boxer Joe Louis had international success with the nickname, the Brown Bomber. After 1980, Leah was a freelancer for the Winnipeg Free Press and also wrote for Seniors Today. In 13 years as a columnist for the Free Press, he chronicled the history of Winnipeg in his editorials in the "Neighbourhood" section of the newspaper.

Leah was the author of eight books on the history of sports in Winnipeg and Manitoba. He wrote 100 years of hockey in Manitoba, in co-operation with the Manitoba Hockey Players' Foundation for the 1970 Manitoba Centennial. His other works include West of the River: The Story of West Kildonan (1970), Pages from the Past (1975), A History of the Blue Bombers (1979), and Alarm of Fire: 100 Years of Firefighting in Winnipeg, 1882–1982 (1982).

== Sports administration ==
Leah established youth sports programs in Winnipeg for baseball, basketball, football, lacrosse, ice hockey, and soccer. He was involved with Sunday school sport programs in the North End, Winnipeg, during the late-1920s, and began the Community Juvenile Hockey League in 1932. He founded the Excelsior Hockey Club in 1934, which won thirteen provincial championships and produced forty professional hockey players. He was nicknamed "Old Frostbite" since he stood in snowbanks while coaching minor ice hockey teams, and later expanded the Excelsior Club to include other sports for youths on a year-round basis. He later organized the Tom Thumb Hockey program in 1944, and the Red, White, and Blue Hockey Organization in 1949.

Leah founded the Juvenile Football League, served as secretary of the Manitoba Football Union, and was a volunteer high school football referee for eighteen years. He helped establish the Winnipeg Bantam Basketball League in 1949, and was a coach, manager, and referee for lacrosse in Winnipeg after the conclusion of World War II. In 1950, he brought Little League Baseball to Canada.

In community recreation, Leah was instrumental in establishing the Margaret Park Community Centre in 1964, and served as its president from 1965 to 1967. He later served on the athletic committee for the Manitoba Centennial in 1970.

== Personal life ==
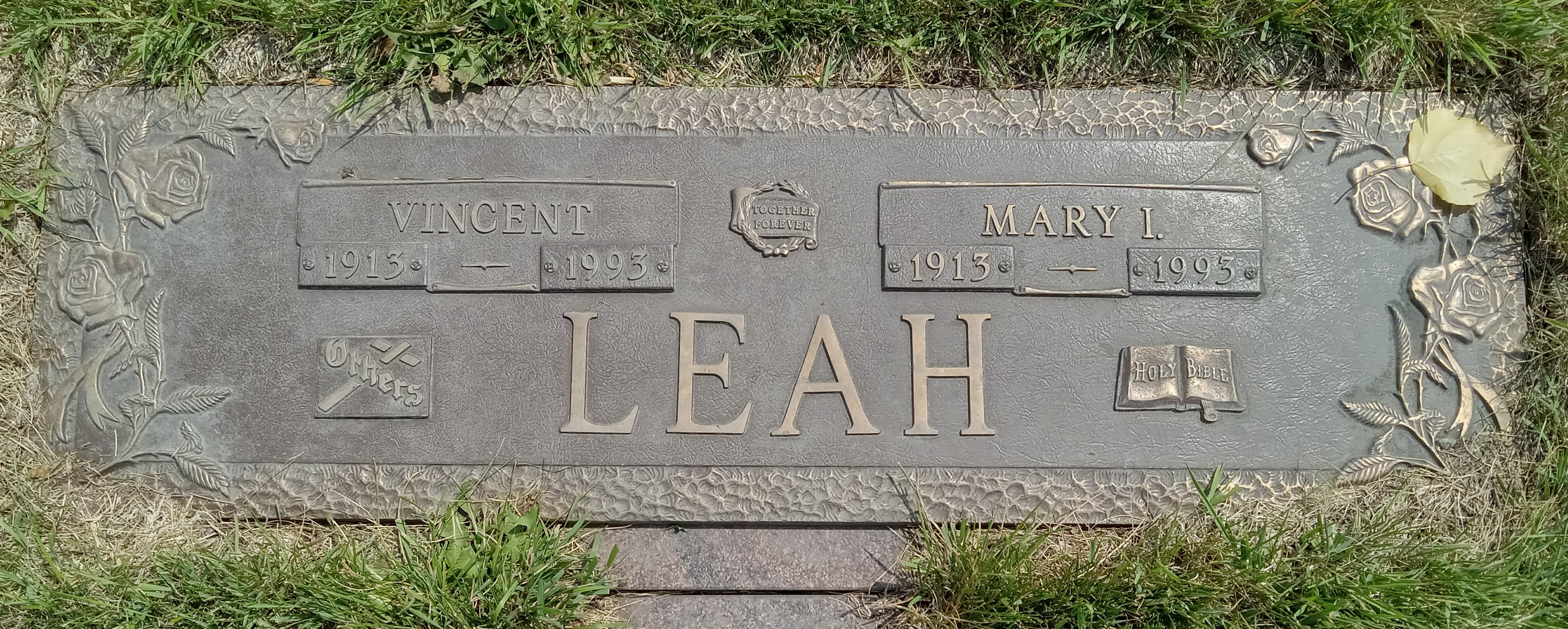
Leah's grave marker

Leah married Mary Isabel Jardine on April 6, 1940, and had one son. Leah was a member of the Kildonan United Church of Canada, the Royal Canadian Legion, the Kiwanis Club, and the Fraternal Order of Eagles. He was an organist at his church, composed music and poetry, and was a watercolour and pastel artist. He died from a heart attack, on August 9, 1993, at the Health Sciences Centre in Winnipeg. His wife of 53 years died the next day on August 10. They were interred at Glen Eden Memorial Garden in West St. Paul, Manitoba.

== Honours and legacy ==
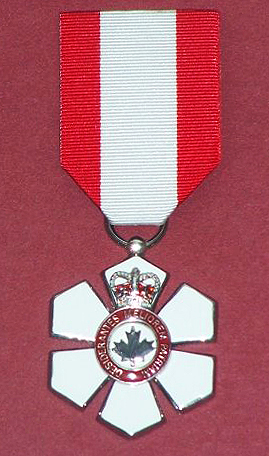
Medal of the Order of Canada

Leah was named to the Manitoba Order of the Buffalo Hunt in 1959. He received the Manitoba Golden Boy Award in 1962, and the Manitoba Centennial Medal of Honour in 1970. When he retired from The Winnipeg Tribune, he was the guest of honour at a civic banquet on June 3, 1980. He was made a member of the Order of Canada on June 23, 1980, for "his work in newspapers and interest in the welfare of the youth of Manitoba". The formal ceremony was hosted by the Governor General of Canada on October 15, 1980. Leah was inducted into the builder category of the Manitoba Sports Hall of Fame in 1981, and the Manitoba Hockey Hall of Fame in 1985. He received an honorary doctorate from the University of Winnipeg in 1985. He was named to the honour roll of the Manitoba Sportswriters and Sportscasters Association in 1987.

Other honours Leah received during his lifetime include, the Canadian Amateur Sports Federation Award for service to amateur sports, the Canadian Parks and Recreation Association Award of Merit, and the United States Recreation Association Award of Merit. He was the first recipient of the Outstanding Volunteer in Sport Award given by the Manitoba Sports Federation, and received the Distinguished Service Award from the Heritage Winnipeg Corporation. He was also a life member of the Manitoba Lawn Bowling Association, the Manitoba Provincial Rifle Association, and the Ward Three Community Baseball League.

Leah was widely known as "Uncle Vince". Winnipeg Sun journalist Jim Bender described Leah as a mentor to his colleagues, and that "he was simply the kindest, gentlest man they'd ever meet". The Margaret Park Community Centre was renamed to the Vince Leah Recreation Centre on October 4, 1980. He was posthumously inducted into the Winnipeg Citizens Hall of Fame in 1994. He was made the namesake of three streets in Winnipeg, and the Vince Leah Trophy awarded to the rookie-of-the-year in the Manitoba Junior Hockey League.
