= The Winnipeg Tribune =

Former Winnipeg newspaper

- Type: Daily newspaper
- Format: Broadsheet
- Owner: Southam Newspapers
- Founded: January 28, 1890; 136 years ago
- Ceased publication: August 27, 1980; 46 years ago
- Language: English
- Headquarters: Winnipeg, Manitoba
- Circulation: 100,000
- Free online archives: UM Libraries

The Winnipeg Tribune was a metropolitan daily newspaper serving Winnipeg, Manitoba, Canada from January 28, 1890, to August 27, 1980. The paper was founded by R.L. Richardson and D.L. McIntyre who acquired the press and premises of the old Winnipeg Sun newspaper. It was often viewed as a liberal newspaper focused on local news and events. The paper was owned by Southam Inc at the time of its demise. It was frequently referred to as The Trib.

== History ==
=== 1890–1975 ===
The Winnipeg Tribune began publishing on January 28, 1890, as a city newspaper, after the old Winnipeg Sun closed down. The initial edition contained four pages of local, national and international news. It was then in competition with two other newspapers: the Manitoba Free Press and the Winnipeg Telegram.

In 1914, the Tribune moved its editorial offices from the Exchange area to the Central Business District area of downtown on Smith Street. It remained there until it closed in August 1980.

During the Winnipeg General Strike in 1919, the newspaper sided with the Citizens' Committee of 1000 and declared, "Winnipeg is now under the Soviet system of government."

It was bought by Southam Newspapers in 1920.

In 1922, the Winnipeg Tribune launched a radio station, CJNC-AM, that broadcast on the frequency 410 kHz and closed down a year later, on March 9, 1923. Said the station manager at the closing:

We have some important news for you. Some of you may not consider it good news. The Tribune will give its last radio concert next Friday night. It will then dismantle its radio equipment and retire permanently from the broadcasting field.

In 1942, the newspaper published a famous army publicity photo of Mary Greyeyes, the first Indigenous woman to enlist in the Canadian Women's Army Corps. The photo was soon picked up by British newspapers overseas.

On Friday, September 5, 1969, the Tribune replaced its small user-folded TV listings printed on yellow paper with a glossy-covered 32-page booklet, TV Times, which was also featured in the Ottawa Citizen and the Montreal Gazette.

On Sunday, June 21, 1970, a new Centrex telephone system was installed for advertisers and subscribers to use when they called. This allowed direct dialing without requiring the person to contact the switchboard operator first.

=== 1975–1980 ===
By the mid-1970s, daily circulation began to slip to 70,000 and was falling. The Southam chain decided on a total redesign of the paper. The new design made its debut on September 6, 1975. Although the offset press could print a 112-page newspaper, the September 6 edition was 124 pages, including the 48-page Trib Classifieds. That forced the press operators to print the Trib Lifestyle section separately. Within a few months, circulation gained 30,000 paid readers, which made the upgrade a success.

A few days before the design change, on September 1, all private sale listings were made in the classified ads free in the form of a Want-Ad Free-for-All promotion. That was because of fierce competition with the Winnipeg Free Press.

In March 1979, it bought some space atop the Casa Loma building (Portage Avenue & Sherbrook Street) to hold Winnipeg's largest billboard. It read, "[logo] With the Trib, it's Winnipeg. First." The billboard was designed by the advertising firm Martel-Stewart Ltd., and was larger than any that had been billboard seen in Winnipeg; it was also the largest in Western Canada. It measured 23 feet tall by 60 feet wide and had 4,200 light bulbs. The billboard space had been used by Export A cigarettes as early as 1959.

When Southam's weekend magazine The Canadian merged with FP Newspapers' Weekend, the Tribune decided to differentiate itself from the Free Press by creating a locally-written tabloid, Trib Magazine, which started on November 24, 1979.

In the late 1970s, the Tribune started publishing the weekend color comics in booklet form as "collectible comics." It was one of the first newspapers (and one of the very few in Canada) to use that short-lived format. The first issue, Vol.1 No.1, was published September 24, 1977. The final issue, Vol.4 No. 34, was published August 23, 1978, when the strips returned to the main edition.

The trademark name is now owned by the paper's old rival, the Winnipeg Free Press.

==== Closure ====
On August 27, 1980, without warning, the Tribune was abruptly closed, and 375 people were out of work. Gene Telpner joked that he had just gotten new drapes and furniture. Val Werier, who was with the Trib for 35 years, said that it was a shocking moment. However, people in the pressroom knew that something was coming because management had stopped the presses that morning. The presses had only stopped on a rare occasion, and when they stopped, it was only for major events.

Shockwaves moved through the community also, and many Winnipeggers were angry about losing a competing public voice.

Worse yet, the closure happened at the same time as the closing of the Ottawa Journal. In 1980, the Ottawa Journal had been purchased by Thomson Newspapers and was closed. That left Southam's Ottawa Citizen as the only major newspaper in Ottawa and the Thompsons' Winnipeg Free Press the only major newspaper in Winnipeg.

The Royal Commission on Newspapers, popularly known as the Kent Commission, was created in 1980 in response to allegations of collusion following the same-day closings of the Thomson-owned Ottawa Journal and the Southam-owned Winnipeg Tribune.

The last issue, with the headline "It's Been 90 Great Years", remains a collector's item to this day.

=== Afterward ===
A number of employees from the Tribune later helped form the Winnipeg Sun.

The University of Manitoba archives and special collections holds a collection of over 500,000 photographs, 250,000 newspaper clippings arranged into morgue files, and microfilm copies of the newspaper.

In 1994, the Lion's Club announced its intention to build an 18-storey apartment tower on the old Winnipeg Tribune site. To be called Tribune Towers, it would be for seniors 55 and older and contain 132 suites. There would have been skywalk connections to the Millennium Library. The project was never completed.

In April 2013, an Ontario-based real estate investment firm, Fortress Real Developments Inc., announced a 45-storey 'SkyCity' condominium project at the old site. However, in 2018 or 2019, the project was cancelled for financial issues relating to the investment and development company.

The University of Manitoba Libraries digitized all the paper's pages from between 1890 and 1980 and has made it freely available online.

== Notable staff ==
- Vince Leah (1930 to 1980), journalist, writer, sports administrator and member of the Order of Canada

== Documentary ==
A documentary, 'The Trib: The Story of an Underdog Newspaper', was released in 2012.
