= Val Werier =

- Born: June 29, 1917; Winnipeg, Manitoba
- Died: April 22, 2014 (aged 96); Winnipeg, Manitoba
- Occupation: Journalist
- Employer(s): Winnipeg Tribune; Winnipeg Free Press
- Known for: Environmental activism, newspaper columnist
- Parents: Mischa Werier (father); Maria Werier (mother)

Valentine Werier, CM OM (June 29, 1917 – April 22, 2014) was a Canadian journalist for the Winnipeg Free Press and prior to its closing in August 1980, The Winnipeg Tribune. Werier was honoured with the Order of Manitoba in 2004 and the Order of Canada. He was born in Winnipeg in 1917.

Werier died at the age of 96 on April 22, 2014.
