= 5468796 Architecture =

Canadian architectural firm

Practice information
- Partners: Sasa Radulovic, Johanna Hurme, Colin Neufeld
- Founded: 2007
- Location: Winnipeg

Significant works and honors
- Projects: Old Market Square Stage, Bloc 10, 62M Housing, Pumphouse, Forks Railside

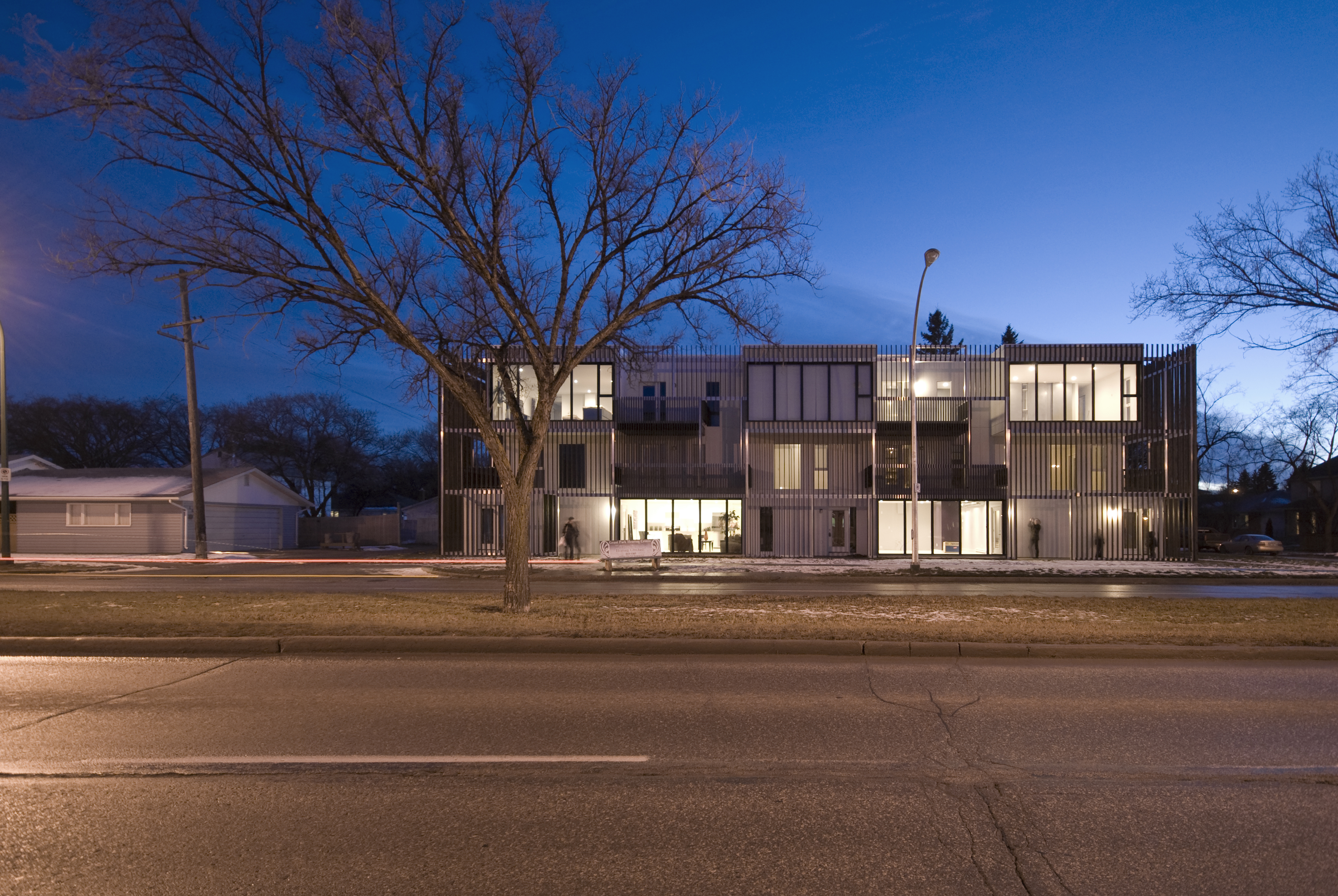
Bloc_10 exterior in Winnipeg

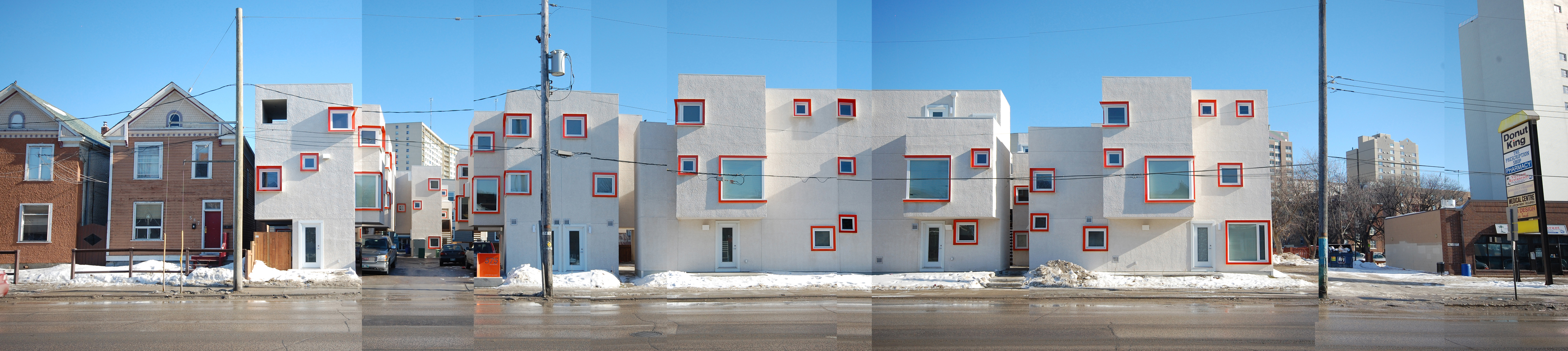
Centre Village in Winnipeg

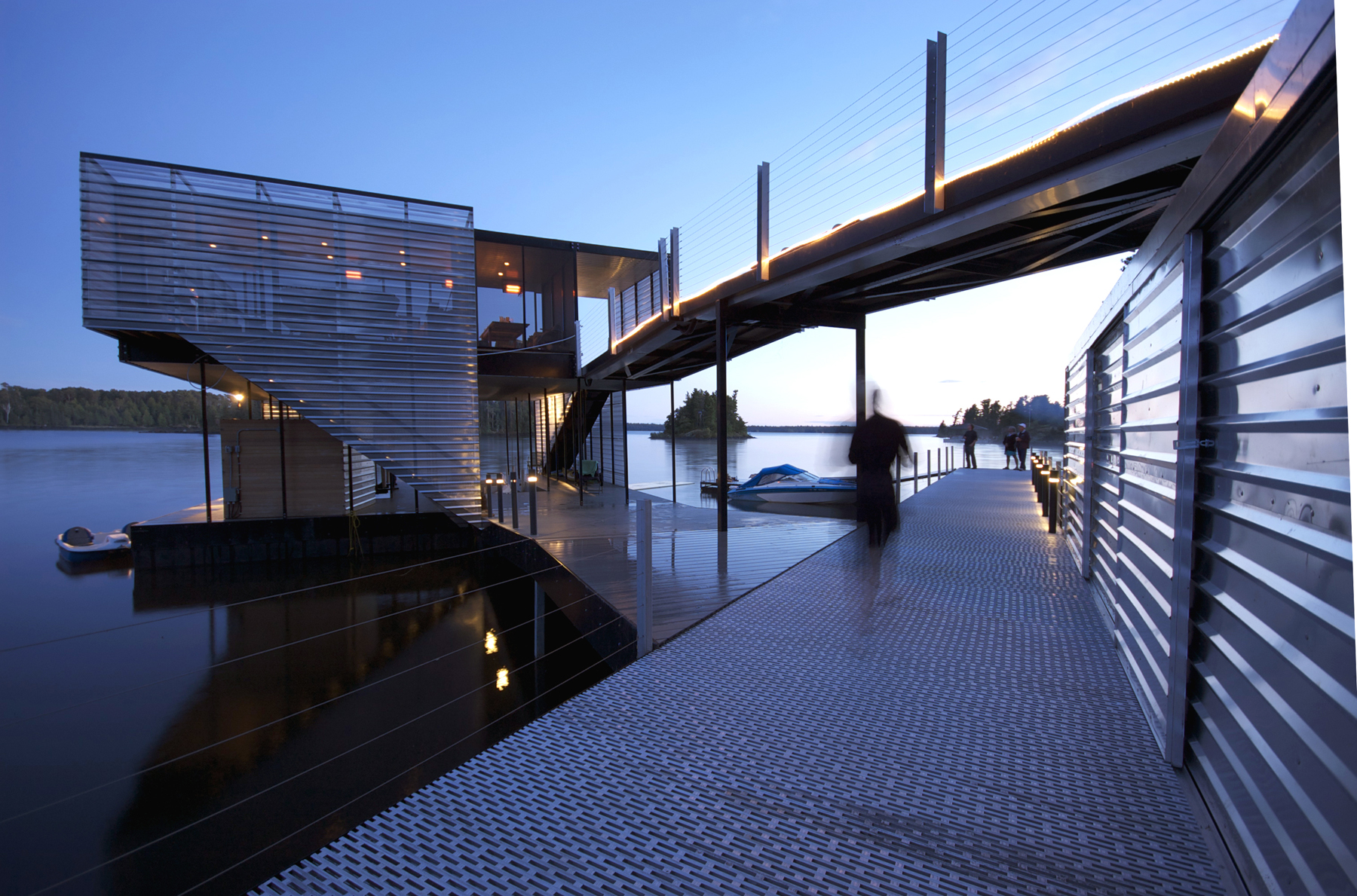
Guertin Boatport in Storm Bay, Ontario

5468796 Architecture is a Winnipeg-based architecture firm founded in 2007.

Beginning as a professional partnership between architects Sasa Radulovic, Johanna Hurme, and Colin Neufeld, the practice promotes a collaborative approach amongst its 20+ members, leading a new wave of contemporary architecture in Winnipeg.

The practice name incorporates its company registration number.

== Background ==
Johanna Hurme and Sasa Radulovic founded 5468796 Architecture in 2007, and were joined shortly thereafter by Colin Neufeld.

One of the first projects to gain the firm international recognition was OMS Stage (also known as The Cube), an open-air performance venue in Old Market Square in Winnipeg's historic Exchange District.

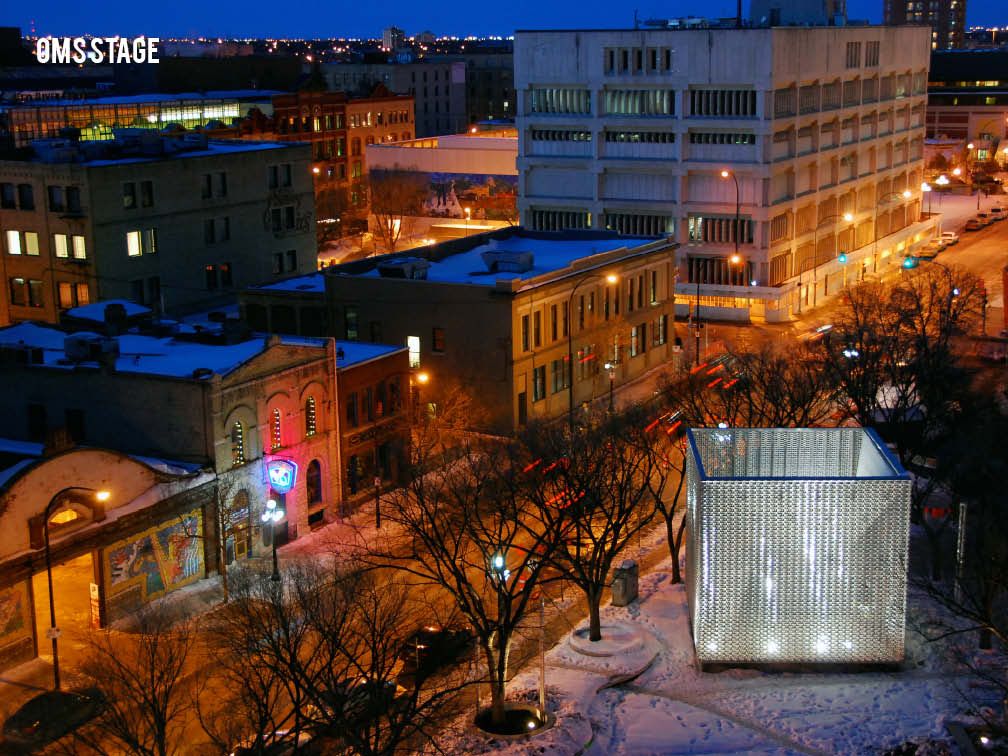
OMS Stage

In 2012, 5468796 Architecture and Winnipeg architect Jae-Sung Chon were selected as Canada's official entry to the 13th International Architecture Exhibition - La Biennale di Venezia for their exhibition, Migrating Landscapes. In 2013, 5468796 Architecture was selected by the Canada Council for the Arts as recipients of the Professional Prix de Rome in Architecture for their travel and research project, Table for 12. As an integral part of practice, 5468796 Architecture established a number of research and engagement platforms to promote design culture and design-related initiatives within a broader community. Hurme led initiatives including Table for 12 and 1200, Chair Your Idea, and Design Quarter Winnipeg. In 2017, Hurme chaired the Winnipeg Chamber of Commerce board introducing the Design Driven Economy platform.

In 2019, Hurme and Radulovic were named Morgenstern Visiting Chairs in Architecture at the Illinois Institute of Architecture in Chicago. The new position enabled the firm to continue their research into affordable and attainable housing. In 2023 5468796 published platform.MIDDLE: Architecture for Housing the 99% that is based and expands on practical research working with challenging economic and environmental circumstances - using 5468786's built works - urban designs and community projects as the foundation to assemble a ‘toolkit’ of strategies for high-quality attainable, accessible and affordable multi-family housing. For the 2022 Spring Semester, Hurme was a Gensler Visiting Critic at Cornell AAP.

== Selected projects ==
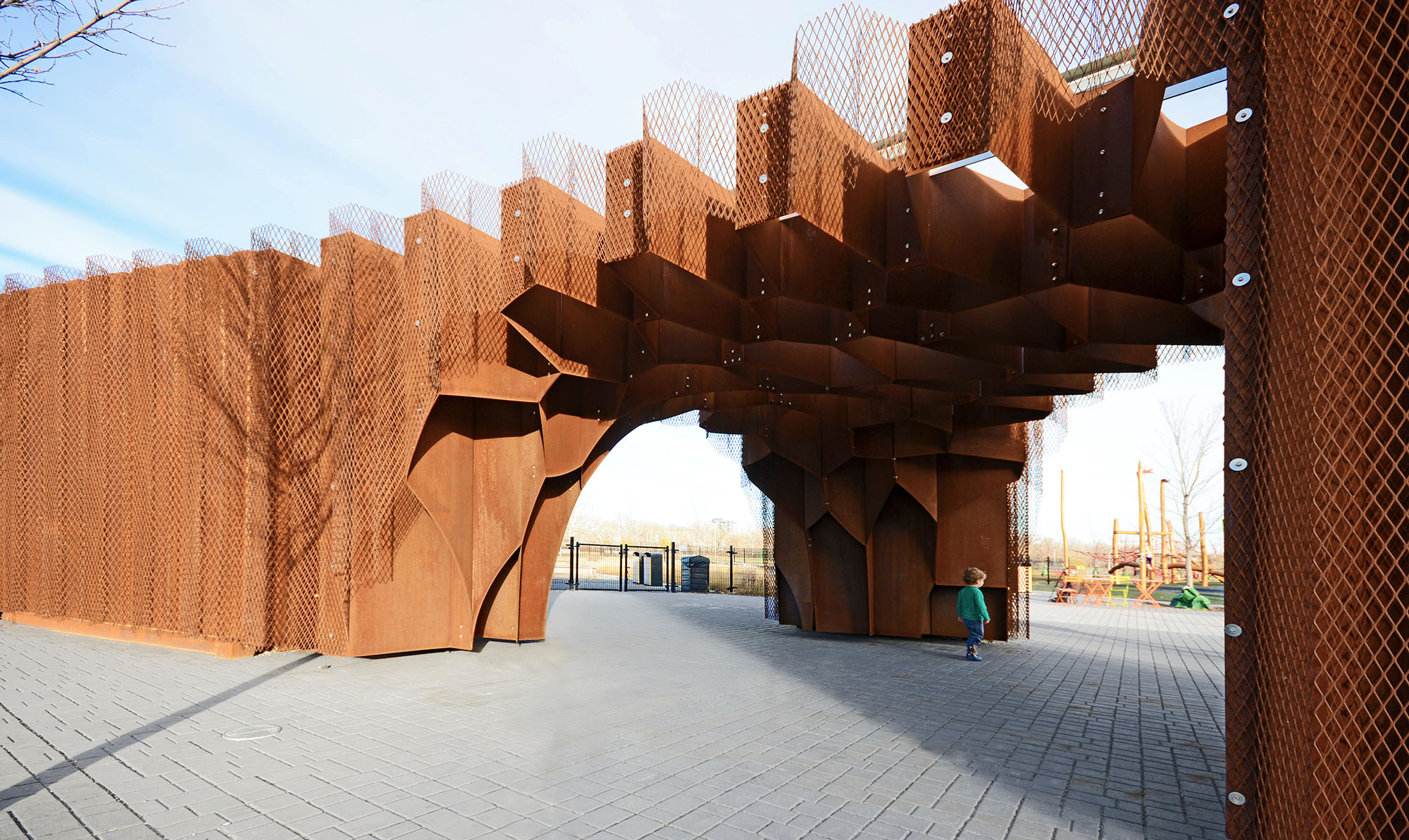
Crossroads Garden Shed

- Pumphouse — Winnipeg, MB
- 90/100 Alexander — Winnipeg, MB
- Arthur Residence — Regina, SK
- Veil House — Winnipeg, MB
- Art Gallery of Greater Victoria (AGGV) — Victoria, BC
- Courtyard 33 (also known as CY33) — Marda Loop, Calgary, Alberta
- Crossroads Garden Shed — Calgary
- 17th Avenue Clinic — Calgary
- Canadian Canoe Museum — Trent–Severn Waterway in Peterborough, Ontario
- IW09 (also known as RNDSQR Block) — Inglewood, Calgary
- Migrating Landscapes; 2012 Venice Biennale in Architecture
- One Bucket at a Time — Greater Mexico City, Mexico
- Table for 12 — a nine-city series of intimate dining events

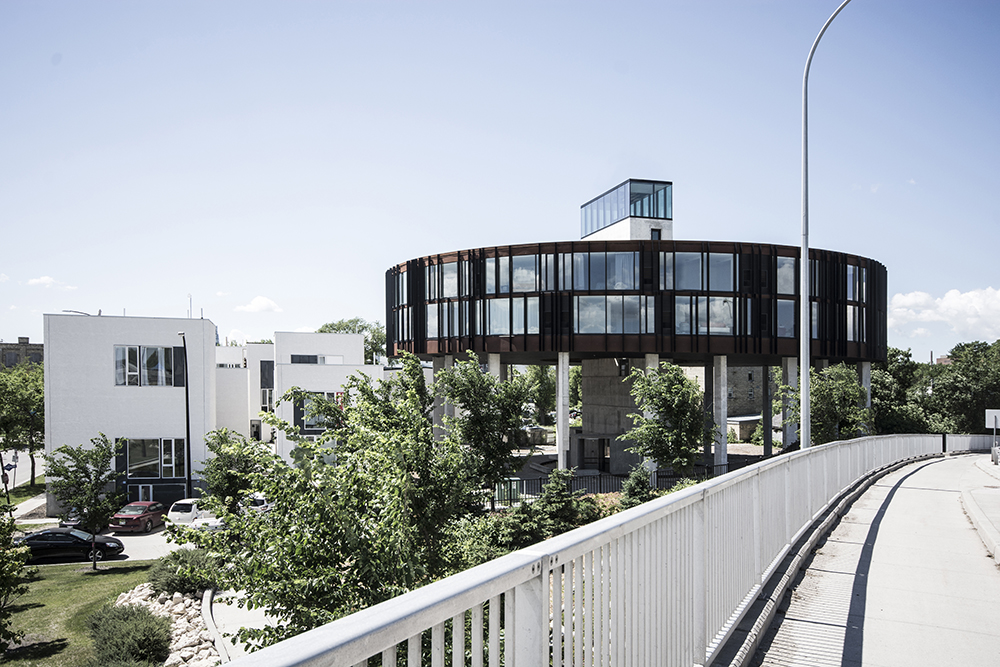
62M, as seen from Disraeli Highway

- 62M
- The Avenue on Portage
  - Manitoba Start — main floor of The Avenue on Portage
- Bloc_10
- Bond Tower
- Centre Village
- Chair Your Idea — crowdsourced urban ideas competition
- James Avenue Pumping Station — Exchange District
- OMS Stage (also known as The Cube) — an open-air performance venue in the Exchange District's Old Market Square
- OZ Condominiums — in Osborne Village, Winnipeg
- Parallelogram House — East St. Paul, Manitoba
- Webster Cottage — Dunottar, Manitoba
- Welcome Place
- WRHA on Hargrave — offices for the Winnipeg Regional Health Authority

== Recognition ==
The firm has been described as "Canada's most exciting new architectural firm in a decade, one dedicated to applying design innovation to the humblest of tasks, a plains-born, good-humoured, resolutely resourceful verve for building modestly, but with elegance." The Houston-based Rice Design Alliance recently stated that they "truly believe 5468796 to be one of the most talented young design firms worldwide."

Since its founding, the firm's work has been recognized through national and international awards and distinctions including:

- Mies Crown Hall Americas Prize Finalist, Cycle Five
- World Architecture Festival Winner - Future Building of the Year
- World Architecture Festival Winner - Best House of the Year (2) Best Health (1) Best Creative Re-use (1)
- Governor General's Award for Architecture (6)
- Rice Design Alliance Spotlight Prize
- Two Time MCHAP.Emerge Finalist
- AZURE 10 Projects that Defined the Decade
- Canada Council for the Arts Professional Prix de Rome in Architecture
- Royal Architectural Institute of Canada Emerging Architectural Practice Award
- WAN 21 for 21 Award
- Architectural Review Emerging Architecture Awards (2)
- Arthur Erickson Memorial Award
- Royal Architectural Institute of Canada Award of Excellence (2)
- Architectural Record Design Vanguard
- Progressive Architecture Awards (2)
- Canadian Architect Awards of Excellence & Merit (9)
- Prairie Design Awards (5)

=== Selected awards ===
- 2024: James Avenue Pumping Station - World Architecture Festival Winner - Creative Re-use
- 2024: Arthur House - World Architecture Festival Winner House of the Year
- 2024: Pumphouse - Governor General Award
- 2023: Veil House - World Architecture Festival Winner House of the Year
- 2022: 17th Avenue Clinic - World Architecture Festival Winner Health Project of the Year
- 2020: DOMUS 50 Best Architectural Firms Worldwide
- 2019: Forks Railside MasterPlan - Urban and Architecture Prize Winner
- 2019: IW09 - RNDSQR Block - Canadian Architect Award
- 2019: Ken Borton - RAIC Young Architect of the Year
- 2019: James Avenue Pumping Station - World Architecture Festival Finalist
- 2018: Housing Northwestern Arkansas Competition Winner
- Crossroads Garden Shed - Architizer A+ People's Choice Winner
- 2018: Parallelogram House - Governor General Award
- 2017: One Bucket at a Time - Interior Design BoY Awards
- 2017: Parallelogram House - Architectural Review House of the Year Finalist
- 2017: Johanna Hurme - Moira Gemmill Prize for Emerging Architecture Shortlist
- 2016: OZ Condominiums - MCHAP.Emerge Finalist
- 2016: Crossroads Garden Shed - American Architecture Prize Platinum Winner
- 2016: Brewery at the Forks: Archmarathon Visioning Category Finalist
- 2016: Tweener - Edmonton Infill Competition Winner
- 2016: Arthur Residence - World Architecture Festival - Category Winner
- 2015: 5468796 - Globe & Mail Canadian Artist of the Year
- 2014: Arthur Residence - Canadian Architect - Award of Excellence
- 2014: AGGV - World Architecture Festival - Future Project of the Year
- 2014: Rice Design Alliance Spotlight Prize
- 2013: 21 for 21 - World Architecture News
- 2013: RAIC Emerging Architectural Practice Award
- 2013: Architizer A+ Award, Guertin Boatport
- 2013: Heritage Winnipeg Special President's Award, The Avenue on Portage
- 2012: Architect Magazine P/A Award, Bond Tower
- 2011: Canadian Architect - Award of Merit, Bond Tower
- 2011: Winnipeg Art Council Awards - Making a Mark Award, 5468796 Architecture
- 2010: Architect Magazine P/A Award, BGBX
- 2009: YouCube - Canadian Architect - Award of Merit

Awards for Bloc_10

- 2010: Canadian Architect Award of Excellence
- 2012: Governor General's Medal in Architecture
- 2012: Prairie Wood Design Awards
- 2012: Architectural Review - Emerging Architecture Award
- 2013: Royal Architectural Institute of Canada - Award of Excellence
- 2015: Premier's Design Award of Excellence

Awards for OMS Stage

- 2010: Architectural Review - Award for Emerging Architecture
- 2011: Royal Architectural Institute of Canada - Award of Excellence
- 2011: AZ Awards - People's Choice
- 2011: Canadian Interiors - Best of Canada Award
- 2014: Mies Crown Hall Americas Prize for Emerging Architecture [shortlisted]
- 2014: Governor General's Medal in Architecture
- 2015: Premier's Design Award of Excellence

== Sources ==
- William Hanley, "The Box Outside", Architectural Record, 2013
- "The Sky's The Limit", Gestalten, 2012
- Trevor Boddy, "Bloc 10 Housing, Winnipeg, Canada by 5468796", Architectural Review, 2012
- Alex Bozikovic, "A condo that pushes theory into the built world", Globe & Mail, 2012
- John Bentley Mays, "Migrating to Venice", Canadian Architect, 2012
- William Hanley, "What's in a name? A Canadian firm connects its collective identity to its practice and projects", Architectural Record, 2011
- Terri Fuglem, "Home away from home", Canadian Architect, 2011
