= Manitoba Electrical Museum =

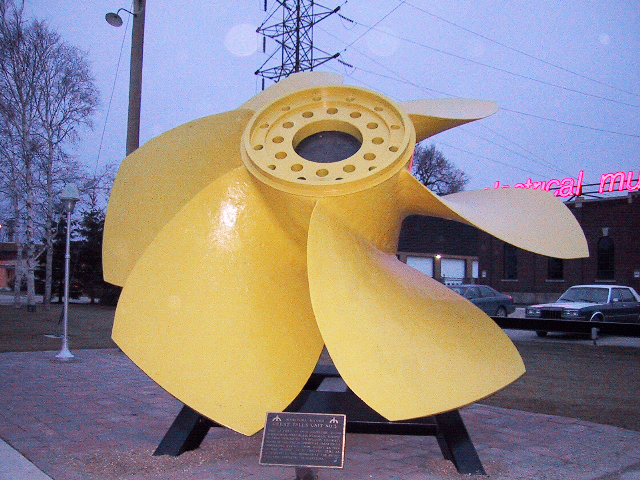
- Location: Winnipeg, Manitoba
- Coordinates: 49.8558°N 97.1547°W
- Type: Electrical Museum

Manitoba Electrical Museum and Education Centre is a museum in Winnipeg, Manitoba, dedicated to the electrical history of Manitoba. It is a volunteer-run organization housed in a converted electrical substation building.

The Museum is affiliated with: CMA, CHIN, and Virtual Museum of Canada.

== Collection ==
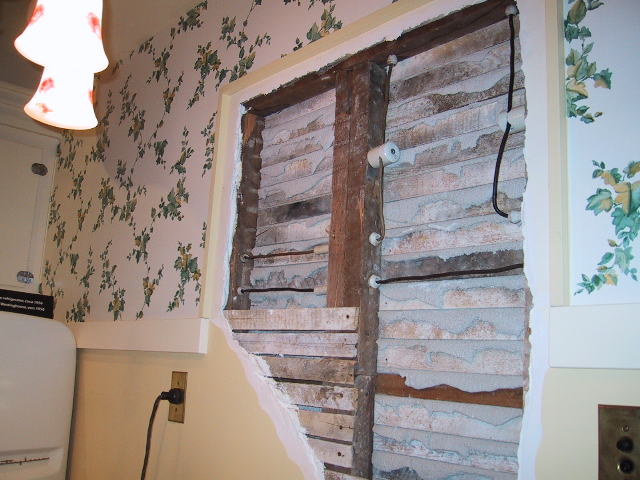
Manitoba Electrical Museum Collection

The museum follows the history through six themes from the 1870s to the present, and looks into the future. On the lower level, hands-on safety activities and seasonal displays are featured. Electricity and electrical safety movies can be shown in the orientation room on the lower level, as well as a collection of vintage Gas Genies. A turbine runner is on permanent display at the Manitoba Electrical Museum.
