= Johanna Hurme =

Canadian architect (born 1975 in Finland)

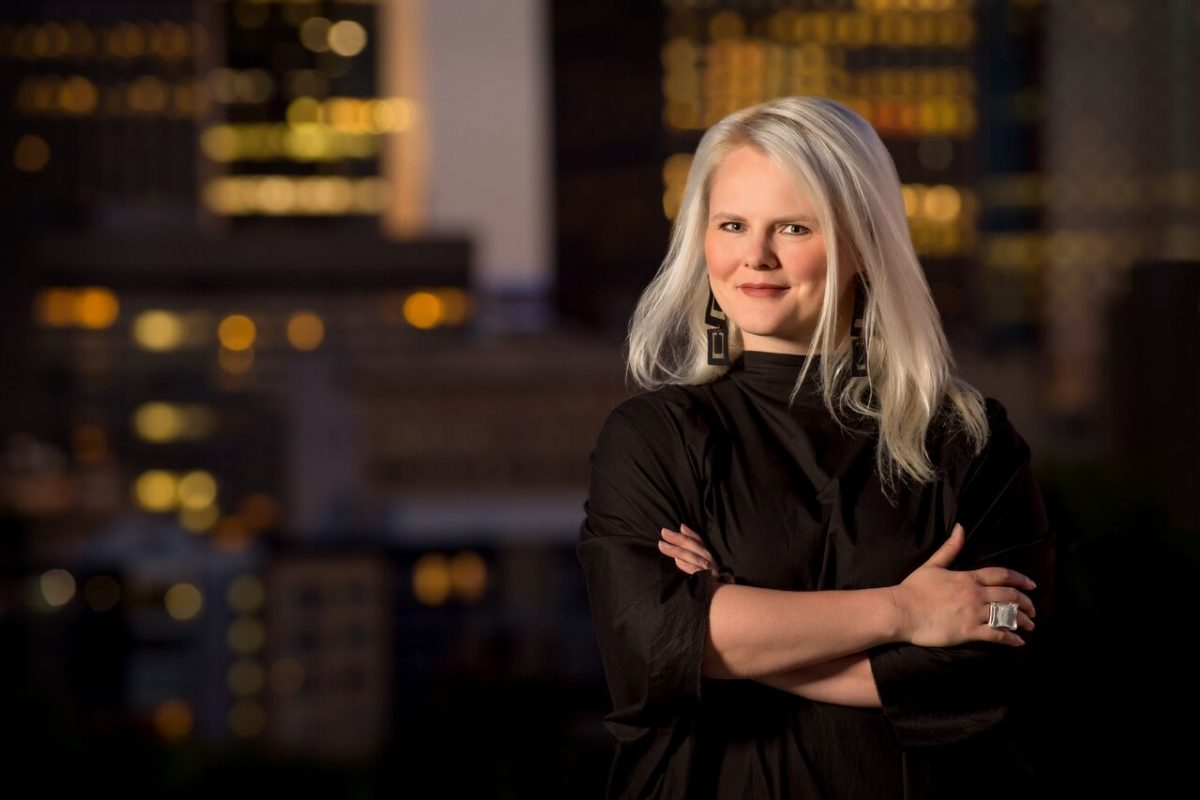
- Portrait of Johanna Hurme, by Bruce Heinrichs Photography, courtesy Winnipeg Chamber of Commerce
- Born: 2 August 1975 (age 51); Helsinki, Finland
- Citizenship: Canada; Finland
- Education: Helsinki University of Technology, Faculty of Architecture at the University of Manitoba (FAUM)
- Occupation: Architect
- Awards: Manitoba Woman Entrepreneur of the Year Award for Emerging Business (2010), Architectural Review’s International Moira Gemmill prize for Women in Architecture (2017, shortlist)
- Practice: 5468796 Architecture
- Buildings: YouCube, OMS Stage, BGBX, Bloc_10, Parallelogram House, 62M, CMLC Parkade of the Future, CY33, LIFE, IW09
- Projects: Chair Your Idea, Table for 12/1200, Migrating Landscapes
- Website: 5468796.ca

Johanna Hurme (born 2 August 1975) is a co-founding and managing partner of the Winnipeg-based studio, 5468796 Architecture, which she leads with Sasa Radulovic and Colin Neufeld. Through her leadership the practice strives to address architectural and civic issues—from city building to contemporary habitation – through inventive solutions engaging design and collaborative experiences to create outstanding architecture irrespective of budget.

== Background ==
Hurme was born in Helsinki, Finland and first came to Canada as a high school exchange student. After studying at the Helsinki University of Technology, Hurme returned to Winnipeg in 1996 and completed a Bachelor of Environmental Design degree and Master of Architecture degree at the Faculty of Architecture at the University of Manitoba (FAUM). She became a Canadian Citizen in 1996.

== Career ==
Hurme is a co-founding partner of 5468796 Architecture located in Winnipeg, Canada. She established the firm in 2007 with University of Manitoba colleague Sasa Radulovic, after the two worked together at Cohlmeyer Architecture. Colin Neufeld, a former university colleague of Hurme and Radulovic, later joined 5468796 Architecture as a partner. According to Canadian Architect Magazine, “As a conceptual and design innovator, Hurme’s work includes a full range of projects and public initiatives including the Crossroads Garden Shed in Calgary, Winnipeg’s 62M Housing and Old Market Square Stage, The Forks Railside Masterplan, Table for 12 and 1200 dinners, Migrating Landscapes (Canada’s official entry to the 13th annual Venice Biennale), and Chair Your Idea, a crowdsourced and crowdfunded idea competition celebrating urban design.” Both her architectural projects and her urban and design advocacy initiatives have been recognized through awards and publications internationally and have been widely published. Under her leadership 5468786 was recognized by the Rice [university] Design Alliance ‘...to be one of the most talented young design firms worldwide’.

== Public leadership and recognition ==
Hurme is a board member of the Royal Architectural Institute of Canada (RAIC) as a regional director for Manitoba (2020–2023 term). She has served as Director of Winnipeg Chamber of Commerce (WCC), which she chaired 2017–2018, and on the Council of the Manitoba Association of Architects. She was a chair of the WCC's Creative Council and president of the RAW Gallery Board of Directors. She is the Founder and CEO of Design Quarter Winnipeg, and is at the forefront of a Manitoba initiative for Quality [and not fee] Based Procurement of architectural services. Hurme is also a member of the International Council of the Van Allen Institute.

Hurme was awarded the Manitoba Woman Entrepreneur of the Year Award for Emerging business in 2010, and in 2017, was shortlisted for Architectural Review’s International Moira Gemmill Prize for Emerging Architecture for Women in Architecture. She has participated in several architectural awards juries including for Canadian Architect, the RAIC, Canada Council, and the Governor General's Medal.

== Advocacy and education ==
An immigrant to Canada, Hurme's external perspective has helped her to advocate for alternative approaches to community-building and value-conscious design. She has been instrumental in instigating events like the Warming Huts Competition, Chair Your Idea, and Table for 12 /1200. In a presentation made at Ted x Winnipeg, Hurme explained the importance of design quality over quantity, economies of overlap or sharing, and the benefits of walkable density for saving money and time.

Hurme teaches and lectures nationally and internationally. She has taught design at the Faculty of Architecture at the University of Manitoba, The University of Toronto Daniels Faculty of Architecture, the University of Montreal's faculty of architecture. In 2019, she was Visiting Professor Morgenstern Chair at the College of Architecture, IIT, Chicago. For the 2022 Spring Semester, Hurme is a Gensler Visiting Critic at Cornell AAP.
