= Fortress Real Developments =

Defunct, fraudulent Canadian real-estate lender involved in syndicated mortgages

Fortress Real Developments Inc.
- Headquarters: Richmond Hill, Ontario, Canada
- Key people: Jawad Rathore and Vince Petrozza
- Products: mortgages
- Website: www.fortressrealdevelopments.com

Fortress Real Developments Inc. (often Fortress Real) was a Canadian real-estate development and lending company that helped finance early-stage projects using syndicated mortgage investments marketed to retail investors. Between about 2008 and 2017, Fortress-linked offerings raised roughly $900–$920 million from thousands of investors across dozens of projects in Canada.

Fortress and related mortgage brokerages became the focus of regulatory enforcement beginning in 2018. In 2020, Ontario's financial regulator imposed an administrative penalty on the company for mortgage-rule contraventions. In 2022, the Royal Canadian Mounted Police (RCMP) charged Fortress's co-founders, Jawad Rathore and Vince Petrozza, with fraud and secret commissions. Both men were convicted in May 2025 of fraud over $5,000; sentencing was pending as of September 2025.

In January 2026, an Ontario court sentenced Fortress co-founders Jawad Rathore and Vince Petrozza to five years’ imprisonment each and ordered them to pay $12.2 million apiece in fines following their fraud convictions.

== History ==
Fortress Real Developments was founded in 2008 by Jawad Rathore and Vince Petrozza to arrange capital for early-stage real-estate projects, often by pairing developers with retail investors through syndicated mortgages.

Fortress raised over $900 million in syndicated mortgage loans before Rathore and Petrozza were charged with fraud. In September 2020, FSRA and Fortress entered into a settlement that included a $250,000 administrative penalty against the company.

=== Affiliated brokers ===
Investments were commonly brokered and/or administered by former in-house broker Building & Development Mortgages Canada (BDMC) and other spin-outs from BDMC and Fortress. The three affiliated firms - FDS Broker Services Inc., FFM Capital Inc. and FMP Mortgage Investments Inc., - were companies whose primary or sole business was brokering Fortress products. On February 1, 2018, the Superintendent of Financial Services announced $1.1 million in administrative monetary penalties and licence revocations for BDMC and several individual brokers that marketed Fortress-related syndicated mortgages. The individuals were Vince Petrozza (Fortress' co-founder), Rosalia Spadafora, Michael Daramola and Glenn May-Anderson. Additionally, Ildina Galati-Ferrante, former principle broker of BDMC, agreed to surrender her license at the same time.

On April 20, 2018, FAAN Mortgage Administrators was appointed by the Ontario Superior Court as trustee over BDMC's assets and administration of its syndicated mortgage portfolio.

== Pre-2018 investor complaints and civil claims ==
Beginning in 2016, multiple proposed class actions were filed in Ontario concerning projects marketed alongside Fortress Real Developments, alleging overvaluation of underlying land and misleading risk disclosure to retail investors. In August 2016, a proposed class action tied to Barrie's Collier Centre sought $27.5 million and criticized the way syndicated mortgages were presented to retail investors.

In October 2016, CBC reporting noted that a SkyCity (Winnipeg) sales presentation to Toronto investors touted 8% returns while omitting key feasibility details, and that three proposed class actions alleged land overvaluation in Fortress-linked projects.

Court filings summarized the same month by industry press alleged investors were provided an “inflated current value” derived from hypothetical future values, rather than “as-is” appraisals. By December 2016, a fourth claim (involving Harmony Village – Lake Simcoe) lifted alleged damages to roughly $100 million, and was the first to include a fraud claim, according to plaintiff counsel cited in coverage.

In November 2017, a Reuters investigation reported that provincial files documented recurring investor complaints: that principal could be at risk, 8% returns were not guaranteed, and substantial fees/commissions (up to ~35%) were deducted; the story also revealed the RCMP opened an investigation in October 2016 into Fortress's syndicated mortgage business. These pre-2018 complaints—particularly around valuations based on projected (rather than “as-is”) property values and non-disclosure of fees and risks—anticipated themes later advanced by prosecutors at trial.

== Criminal investigation, trial, convictions and sentencing ==
Following a multi-year RCMP Integrated Market Enforcement Team investigation (sometimes referred to publicly as “Project Dynasty”), the co-founders were charged in June 2022 with fraud and secret commissions, with initial appearances scheduled in Toronto.

An Ontario Court of Justice trial presided over by Justice Daniel Moore began in October 2024 and focused on two Fortress projects: the proposed SkyCity tower in Winnipeg and the Collier Centre in Barrie, Ontario. On May 28, 2025, Justice Daniel Moore found both Rathore and Petrozza guilty of fraud over $5,000.

The court concluded that investors were misled when loan-to-value ratios were presented using projected future values rather than current “as-is” values, which amounted to the non-disclosure of material facts. These findings echoed concerns raised years earlier in civil lawsuits and press reports: in 2016–17, multiple class actions and media investigations had already alleged that land was overvalued on a “future” basis, that risks were minimized in marketing, and that substantial commissions were not disclosed to retail investors.

=== Sentencing ===
On September 23, 2025, the Ontario Court of Justice sentenced Jawad Rathore and Vince Petrozza to five years in prison each following their May 2025 convictions for fraud over $5,000 arising from the Collier Centre (Barrie, Ontario) and SkyCity Centre (Winnipeg, Manitoba) projects.

Justice Daniel Moore also ordered each man to pay a $12.2 million fine, representing proceeds of crime deemed unavailable for forfeiture. The sentence includes an additional five years of imprisonment if either offender fails to pay the fine within 10 years of release from custody.

The court further imposed lifetime prohibitions barring Rathore and Petrozza from holding positions of authority over other people’s money or property. Justice Moore indicated that restitution orders would be made for victims who testified at trial, with any restitution payments credited against the fines.

In his reasons, Justice Moore rejected defence submissions seeking a conditional sentence, finding that the fraud involved a high degree of planning and complexity, lasted nearly four and a half years, and affected hundreds of retail investors. He concluded that although the projects themselves were not fictitious, investors were deceived about the true security of their syndicated mortgage investments, and that the resulting losses were directly attributable to the fraud.

Both Rathore and Petrozza were granted bail pending appeal. Their counsel filed notices of appeal alleging that the trial judge misapprehended evidence relating to property valuations and applied incorrect legal standards in reaching the verdict.

== Notable projects ==
Project	City / Province	Estimated Project Size	Fortress Capital (syndicated mortgages)	Key Issues	Investor Recovery / Settlements
Collier Centre	Barrie, Ontario	Mixed-use commercial tower (> $100M)	~$27.5M raised from investors	Entered bankruptcy protection (2015); foreclosure by senior lender Morrison Financial (2019)	Partial recovery through settlements: • $8M BDMC/Galati settlement shared across 5 projects (2023) • $2.375M FFM/Spadafora settlement allocated across Collier/Sutton/Orchard
SkyCity Centre	Winnipeg, Manitoba	45-storey condo tower (~$200M project)	~$32M syndicated mortgages	Cancelled 2018; condo buyers refunded deposits; RCMP raid 2018; founders charged with fraud in 2022	Buyers refunded deposits; investor losses likely substantial but no published recovery %
Brookdale (Avenue Road)	Toronto, Ontario	Mid-rise condo (projected ~$100M revenue)	~$26.6M syndicated mortgages (junior ranking)	Construction halted Jan 2018; cancelled May 2018; foreclosure filed by Firm Capital for $19.1M senior loan; $7.7M in liens	No reported recovery data; investor losses likely significant
Capital Pointe	Regina, Saskatchewan	27-storey condo/hotel tower (~$100M project)	~$33M syndicated mortgages	Permits rescinded 2018; City ordered unsafe excavation backfilled; Fortress/Westgate appealed	No settlement or recovery data publicly reported
Harmony Village – Lake Simcoe (The Kemp)	Barrie region, Ontario	Residential development (tens of millions)	~$31M syndicated mortgages	Defaulted; sold under receivership; among first projects to face fraud-inclusive class action (2016)	Partial recovery through settlements: • $8M BDMC/Galati settlement shared across 5 projects (2023) • $2.375M FFM/Spadafora settlement allocated across Collier/Sutton/Orchard; Overall investor recovery estimated well below 50%
Sutton / The Link	Burlington, Ontario	Condo development (~$60–70M project)	Syndicated mortgages via BDMC	Part of 2016–17 class actions alleging overvaluation and misleading risk disclosure	Settlement with Adi Development (June 2023) delivered approx. 91% return of investor principal — the highest recovery rate among Fortress projects
