= Sasa Radulovic (architect) =

Bosnian-Canadian architect

- Born: 1972 (age 53–54); Sarajevo
- Occupation: Architect
- Known for: Affordable innovative buildings, Architecture advocacy
- Notable work: OMS stage, 62M, Welcome Place, James Ave. Pumping Station, Parallelogram House
- Website: http://www.5468796.ca/

Sasa Radulovic is a Bosnian-Canadian architect and co-founding partner of 5468796 Architecture, an award-winning Canadian firm based in Winnipeg. His firm is known for affordable, highly innovative, urban architectural projects, which include institutional, commercial and residential structures.

== Background ==
Radulovic fled Sarajevo during the Bosnian War. His personal experience as a war refugee has influenced his work as an architect. For example, an earlier commission involved constructing affordable, yet livable, housing for immigrants and low-income renters. The structure was built around a muse and a courtyard with numerous windows ‘putting eyes on the street’, while each townhouse dwelling was equipped with a balcony and private exterior entrance.

Radulovic, after studying architecture in Sarajevo and Belgrade, obtained his degrees in architecture from the University of Manitoba's School of Architecture, where he met his partners Johanna Hurme originally from Helsinki, Finland and Colin Neufeld from Winnipeg. Growing up outside of Canada, provided "...outsider’s perspective (that) might be one factor in their breaking the mold." Despite its lack of big city resources, 5468796 finds Winnipeg a fertile ground for architectural innovation. According to the trio, the city has many other advantages, such as being able to make an impact with the most modest of projects or interventions. They also feel that Winnipeg has a distinct quality : "It’s quirky making it interesting here."

== Career ==
=== Buildings and awards ===
Radulovic is one of the co-founders of the Winnipeg architectural firm 5468796 Architecture, which has received national and international recognition. After working together at Cohlmeyer Architecture, he and architect Johanna Hurme teamed up and founded their own company in 2007, making it Winnipeg's first architectural start-up in two decades. They are credited with being "... behind many bold new additions to Winnipeg's cityscape...", thus contributing to a rebirth of the city's architecture. Their firm is seen as "...leading a new generation of local architects to invent a new city, and perhaps a new Canada,..."

Several of their public housing and residential projects have included courtyards, thus providing city dwellers with a peaceful green space. Their Parallelogram House, 2018 recipient of Governor General Award, located on the outskirts of Winnipeg, is noted for its flowing spaces and connection to the exterior landscape. A recent $20 million contract involves redeveloping a Winnipeg heritage building and received much local media attention. Radulovic met regularly with city planners, resulting in several concessions so the project could go ahead in 2017.

Using inexpensive materials their monochromatic buildings have been described as having "...a restrained yet celebrated aesthetic." A hundred year old office building was transformed into a residential block by adding a black facade and different sized balconies. A new cube-shaped structure, made from aluminium, was designed to act as both an outdoor stage and art installation. The hyper-modernist OMS stage won the Governor General's Medal in Architecture in 2014. In 2012, their three-story condominium project, a white boxlike building called Bloc_10, also received a Governor General's Medal in Architecture.

Recipient of numerous prizes and honours, Radulovic represented Canada at the 2012 Venice Architecture Biennale. Radulovic, Hurme and Jae-Sung Chon curated the transformation of the permanent Canadian Pavilion. In 2013, he and Hurme received the Royal Architectural Institute of Canada’s Emerging Architectural Practice Award. In 2014, 5468796 Architecture competed against top international firms, winning the Best Future Project prize at the World Architecture Festival in Singapore. In 2015, Radulovic and his two associates were voted the top 100 Most Fascinating Manitobans. In 2017, Radulovic and Hurme were bestowed fellowships by The College of Fellows of the Royal Architectural Institute of Canada.

=== Advocacy ===
Radulovic is one of the instigators of the "Warming Huts" competition, where each year architects from around the world submit designs for shelters to be built along a winter skating trail. Also seen as a culture maker, 5468796 Architecture spearheaded the "Table for 12" dinner event held in 2013, which promoted discussions about urban architecture, attracting architects, art groups, and governmental institutions. Radulovic sees design advocacy as being an important part of the work that he and his colleagues do.

Radulovic sits on an executive board, as well as an advisory Committee, at the University of Manitoba. He regularly speaks at various public engagements and academic conferences. In January 2018, he gave a lecture at Dalhousie University in Halifax concerning the influence of architecture on design. In 2017, he and partner Hurme were part of the Omaha lecture series organized by the American Institute of Architects. They have also headlined conferences at Université Laval in 2018 and at Université de Montréal in 2015. In 2015, Radulovic participated in a public discussion held by the Toronto Society of Architects. In 2012, he and Hurme were asked to present at the Architectural League’s lecture series in New York City.
