= List of writers from Manitoba =

The Canadian province of Manitoba has produced writers across a wide variety of genres. This list includes notable writers who were born in Manitoba or spent a significant portion of their writing career living in Manitoba.

== A ==
- Charles Adler (born 1954), journalist
- Ralph Allen (1913–1966), journalist, novelist
- George Amabile (born 1936), poet
- Jeffrey Anderson (1928–2014), journalist
- Robert T. Anderson (1880–1960), poet
- Kate Armstrong (born 1962), memoirist
- David Arnason (born 1940), poet, novelist
- Joanne Arnott (born 1960), poet, children's writer
- Roger Avary (born 1965), screenwriter
- Nahlah Ayed (living), journalist
- Robert Ayre (1900–1980), journalist, essayist

== B ==
- Constance Backhouse (born 1952), historian
- Linda Bailey (born 1948), children's writer
- Marie Annharte Baker (born 1942), poet
- David Bazay (1939–2005), journalist
- Margaret Bemister (1877–1984), novelist, journalist
- Margret Benedictsson (1866–1956), journalist
- David Bergen (born 1957), novelist
- Brandi Bird (living), poet
- Sandra Birdsell (born 1942), novelist, short story writer
- Jóhann Magnús Bjarnason (1866–1945), novelist, poet
- Jeff Blair (born 1960), journalist
- Laurie Block (1949–2018), poet
- Patricia Blondal (1926–1959), novelist
- Allan Blye (1937–2024), screenwriter
- Dianna Boileau (1931–2014), memoirist
- Carol Bolt (1941–2000), playwright
- Paulette Bourgeois (born 1951), children's writer
- Marilyn Bowering (born 1949), poet, novelist, playwright
- Kate Bowler (born 1980), historian
- Ken Brand (living), playwright
- Barbara Branden (1929–2013), non-fiction writer
- Di Brandt (born 1952), poet
- Lois Braun (born 1949), short story writer
- Barry Broadfoot (1926–2003), journalist, historian
- Bertram Brooker (1888–1955), novelist, playwright, essayist
- Martha Brooks (born 1944), playwright, novelist
- Cecily Brownstone (1909–2005), food writer
- Tyler Brûlé (born 1968), journalist
- Gerald Bubis (1924–2015), non-fiction writer
- Wilfred Buck (born 1954), non-fiction writer
- Margaret Buffie (living), novelist
- Tyler Clark Burke (living), children's writer
- Bonnie Burstow (1945–2020), novelist
- Aaron Bushkowsky (born 1957), poet, playwright
- Kristin Butcher (living), novelist

== C ==
- Norman Cantor (1929–2004), historian
- Jodi Carmichael (living), novelist, children's writer
- Fern G. Z. Carr (living), poet
- Rick Chafe (living), playwright
- Barry Chamish (1952–2016), non-fiction writer
- Catherine Chatterley (living), historian
- Jonas Chernick (born 1973), screenwriter
- George Fisher Chipman (1882–1935), journalist
- Solomon Cleaver (1855–1939), novelist
- Lisa R. Cohen (living), journalist
- Jim Coleman (1911–2001), journalist
- Ralph Connor (1860–1937), novelist
- Darla Contois (living), screenwriter
- Geoffrey Cornish (1914–2012), non-fiction writer
- Andrew Coyne (born 1960), journalist
- Douglas Cumming (born 1970), non-fiction writer
- Ken Cuperus (born 1972), screenwriter

== D ==
- Lynnette D'anna (born 1955), novelist
- John Wesley Dafoe (1866–1944), journalist
- Andrew Davidson (born 1969), novelist
- William Arthur Deacon (1890–1977), literary critic
- Rosanna Deerchild (living), poet
- Vicki Delany (born 1951), novelist
- Sven Delblanc (1931–1992), novelist
- David Demchuk (living), playwright, novelist
- Muriel Denison (1886–1954), novelist
- Kady MacDonald Denton (born 1941), children's writer
- Michelle Desbarats (living), poet
- Grant Dexter (1896–1961), journalist
- Olive Dickason (1920–2011), historian, journalist
- Ty Dilello (born 1993), non-fiction writer
- Nathan Divinsky (1925–2012), non-fiction writer
- Kevin Doherty (living), playwright, screenwriter
- Brian Drader (born 1960), playwright
- MaryLou Driedger (born 1953), journalist, novelist
- Dora Dueck (born 1950), novelist
- Douglas Durkin (1884–1967), novelist, short story writer, screenwriter
- Arnold Dyck (1889–1970), novelist
- Jonathan Dyck (1889–1970), graphic novelist

== E ==
- Bob Edwards (1860–1922), journalist
- Charles Edwards (1906–1983), journalist
- Kyle Edwards (living), novelist
- John Einarson (born 1952), historian, journalist
- David Elias (born 1949), novelist
- Sarah Ens (born 1992), poet
- Jo-Ann Episkenew (1952–2016), non-fiction writer
- Ernie Epp (born 1941), historian
- Ian C. Esslemont (born 1962), novelist
- Danishka Esterhazy (living), screenwriter

== F ==
- Ken Finkleman (born 1946), screenwriter, novelist
- Jon Paul Fiorentino (living), poet, novelist, short story writer
- Valerie Fortney (living), journalist
- Marvin Francis (1955–2005, poet
- Trent Frayne (1918–2012), journalist
- Alice Masak French (1930–2013), non-fiction writer
- Patrick Friesen (born 1946), poet, playwright
- Deborah Froese (born 1957), non-fiction writer

== G ==
- Alfred Garrioch (1848–1934), non-fiction writer
- Sean Garrity (living), screenwriter
- Zsuzsi Gartner (born 1960), journalist
- Pauline Gedge (born 1945), novelist
- Dave Godfrey (1938–2015), novelist
- Suzanne Goldenberg (living), journalist, non-fiction writer
- Noam Gonick (born 1973), screenwriter
- Allan Gotlieb (1928–2020), non-fiction writer
- Sondra Gotlieb (1936–2026), journalist, novelist
- George R. D. Goulet (born 1933), historian
- Neile Graham (born 1958), poet
- David Gratzer (born 1974), non-fiction writer
- Carolyn Gray (living), playwright
- Archie Green (1917–2009), folklorist
- Hannah Green (living), poet
- Frederick Philip Grove (1879–1948), novelist
- Jan Guenther Braun (living), novelist
- Eric Gurney (1910–1992), screenwriter
- Guttormur J. Guttormsson (1878–1966), playwright, poet

== H ==
- Marilyn Hall (1927–2017), screenwriter
- Anne Hart (1935–2019), biographer
- Kaj Hasselriis (born 1974), journalist
- Ruth Heller (1923–2004), children's writer
- Tom Hendry (1929–2012), playwright, screenwriter
- Joanne Hershfield (born 1950), non-fiction writer
- Paul Hiebert (1892–1987), novelist
- John C. Higgins (1908–1995), screenwriter
- Tomson Highway (born 1951), playwright, novelist
- Douglas Hill (1935–2007), novelist
- Ella Cora Hind (1861–1942), journalist
- Gerda Hnatyshyn (1935–2023), non-fiction writer
- Linda Holeman (living), novelist
- Edna Mayne Hull (1905–1975), novelist
- Jack Humphrey (1932–1987), screenwriter
- Catherine Hunter (born 1957), poet
- Robert Hunter (1941–2005), journalist, novelist

== I ==
- Sally Ito (born 1964), poet

== J ==
- Stanley Jackson (1914–1981), screenwriter
- Sandy Jobin-Bevans (born 1972), screenwriter
- Lynn Johnston (born 1947), comics writer

== K ==
- Michael Kaan (living), novelist
- Adeena Karasick (born 1965), poet, essayist
- Martin Kavanagh (1895–1987), historian
- Joseph Kay (living), screenwriter
- Diane Keating (born 1940), poet
- David Keck (living), novelist
- John Keeble (born 1944), novelist
- Mary-Ann Kirkby (born 1959), memoirist
- Verna Kirkness (born 1935), non-fiction writer
- Bartley Kives (living), journalist
- Jon Klassen (born 1981), children's writer
- Sarah Klassen (born 1932), poet
- Frances Koncan (born 1986), journalist, playwright
- Ken Kostick (1953–2011), cookbook writer
- Allan Kroeker (born 1951), screenwriter

== L ==
- Margaret Laurence (1926–1987), novelist, short story writer
- Vince Leah (1913–1993), journalist
- Howard Leeds (1919–2017), screenwriter
- Sylvia Legris (born 1960), poet
- Cyril Edel Leonoff (1925–2016), historian
- J. R. Léveillé (living), novelist
- Allan Levine (living), non-fiction writer, novelist
- Diana Lindsay (born 1944), non-fiction writer
- Robert Linsley (1952–2017), non-fiction writer
- Dorothy Livesay (1909–1996), poet
- Lynette Loeppky (living), memoirist
- Royden Loewen (born 1954), historian
- Tim Long (born 1969), screenwriter
- Jack Ludwig (1922–2018), novelist, short story writer
- Sidura Ludwig (living), novelist, short story writer

== M ==
- Duncan MacArthur (1840–1907), non-fiction writer
- Jake MacDonald (1949–2020), novelist
- Mary MacLane (1881–1929), memoirist
- Guy Maddin (born 1956), screenwriter
- James Makichuk (born 1946), screenwriter
- Kuzhali Manickavel (living), novelist
- Fletcher Markle (1921–1991), screenwriter
- Don Marks (1953–2016), journalist
- John Marlyn (1912–2005), novelist
- Bill Mason (1929–1988), naturalist
- Jack Matheson (1924–2011), journalist
- Jim Matheson (born 1949), journalist
- Shirlee Matheson (born 1943), children's writer
- Chandra Mayor (born 1973), poet, novelist
- Kyle McCulloch (born 1962), screenwriter
- Brock McElheran (1918–2008), non-fiction writer
- Ryan McKenna (living), screenwriter
- Ken McKenzie (1923–2003), journalist
- A. B. McKillop (born 1946), non-fiction writer
- Margaret Stovel McWilliams (1875–1952), historian
- Billy Merasty (born 1960), playwright
- Duncan Mercredi (born 1951), poet
- Ben Metcalfe (1919–2003), journalist
- Roy Miki (1942–2024), poet
- Earl Mindell (born 1940), non-fiction writer
- Bob Moir (1929–2016), journalist
- Susie Moloney (born 1962), novelist
- Tara Lee Morin (living), poet, memoirist
- Garry Thomas Morse (living), poet, novelist
- Beatrice Mosionier (born 1949), novelist

== N ==
- Michael Nathanson (living), playwright
- Holly Nelson (living), poet, journalist
- Enid Nemy (born 1924), journalist
- J. Kelly Nestruck (living), journalist
- Don Newman (born 1940), journalist

== O ==
- Sheldon Oberman (1949–2004), children's writer
- Patrick O'Connell (1944–2005), poet
- Carol Off (living), journalist
- Margo Oliver (1923–2010), cookbook writer
- Martin O'Malley (1939–2025), journalist

== P ==
- John Paizs (born 1957), screenwriter
- Leo Panitch (1945–2020), non-fiction writer
- Gudrun Parker (1920–2022), screenwriter
- Walt Patterson (born 1936), non-fiction writer
- Leonard Peikoff (born 1933), philosopher
- Carol Philipps (1965–2009), journalist
- Casey Plett (born 1987), novelist, short story writer
- Delbert Plett (1948–2004), historian
- Audrey Poetker (born 1962), poet
- Michelle Porter (living), novelist

== Q ==
- Sina Queyras (living), poet, novelist, essayist

== R ==
- Corey Redekop (living), novelist
- Byron Rempel (born 1962), novelist
- Bill Richardson (born 1955)
- Harry Rintoul (1956–2002), playwright
- David Robertson (born 1977), novelist
- Heather Robertson (1942–2014), journalist, novelist, non-fiction writer
- John Robertson (1934–2014), journalist
- William John Rose (1885–1968), historian
- Malcolm Ross (born 1946)
- Sinclair Ross (1908–1996), novelist, short story writer
- Gabrielle Roy (1909–1983), novelist
- Alexei Maxim Russell (living), novelist, non-fiction writer
- Frances Russell (1941–2022), journalist, non-fiction writer

== S ==
- Laura Salverson (1890–1970), novelist
- Karl Schroeder (born 1962), novelist
- Cynthia Scott (born 1939), screenwriter
- Murdo Scribe (1920–1983), children's writer
- Catherine Seipp (1957–2007), journalist
- Merilyn Simonds (born 1949), novelist, non-fiction writer
- Beverley Rosen Simons (born 1938), playwright
- Pamela Mala Sinha (living), playwright
- Reuben Slonim (1914–2000), journalist
- Gwen Smid (born 1979), children's writer
- Maurice Smith (1909–1985), journalist
- Adam Smoluk (born 1960), screenwriter
- Don Starkell (1932–2012), diarist
- Robert J.C. Stead (1880–1959), novelist, poet
- Jason Stefanik (living), poet
- Johanna Stein (living), screenwriter
- Bill Stilwell (living), nature writer
- Margaret Sweatman (born 1953), novelist
- Gillian Sze (living), poet, children's writer

== T ==
- Astra Taylor (born 1979)
- Gladys Taylor (1917–2015), novelist, memoirist
- Wayne Tefs (1947–2014), novelist
- Rosalie Tennison (1958–2025), journalist, memoirist
- J. Grant Thiessen (born 1947), bibliographer
- Vern Thiessen (born 1964), playwright
- Joan Thomas (born 1949), novelist
- Madison Thomas (living), screenwriter
- Clayton Thomas-Müller (living), memoirist
- John Herd Thompson (1946–2019), historian
- Georgia Toews (born 1990), novelist
- Miriam Toews (born 1964), novelist
- Gérald Tougas (1933–2019), novelist
- Rhea Tregebov (born 1953), poet, novelist, children's writer

== U ==
- Chimwemwe Undi (living), poet
- Andrew Unger (born 1979), novelist

== V ==
- W. D. Valgardson (born 1939), novelist, poet
- A. E. van Vogt (1912–2000), novelist
- Nia Vardalos (born 1962), screenwriter
- Caelum Vatnsdal (born 1970), non-fiction writer
- Katherena Vermette (born 1977), poet, novelist
- Rhayne Vermette (born 1982), screenwriter

== W ==
- Miriam Waddington (1917–2004), poet, short story writer
- David Waltner-Toews (born 1948), poet, essayist, non-fiction writer
- Ryan Ward (born 1979), screenwriter
- Jack Wasserman (1927–1977), journalist
- Alison Watt (born 1957), poet, novelist
- Judy Waytiuk (living), journalist
- Susan Weidman Schneider (born 1944), non-fiction writer
- John Weier (born 1949), poet
- Jordan Wheeler (born 1964), children's writer
- Joshua Whitehead (living), poet, novelist
- Douglas Whiteway (born 1961), journalist
- Kenneth Whyte (born 1960), journalist
- Armin Wiebe (born 1948), novelist
- Rudy Wiebe (born 1934), novelist, short story writer, non-fiction writer
- Diana Wieler (born 1961), children's writer
- Adele Wiseman (1928–1992), novelist
- George Woodcock (1912–1995), philosopher, non-fiction writer
- Betty Jane Wylie (born 1931), playwright, non-fiction writer

== Y ==
- Daniel Yanofsky (1925–2000), non-fiction writer
- Scott Young (1918–2005), journalist, novelist

== Z ==
- David Zieroth (born 1946), poet
- Larry Zolf (1934–2011), journalist, non-fiction writer

== See also ==
- Culture of Manitoba
- List of writers from Alberta
- List of writers from Saskatchewan
- List of Canadian writers
