= Aqua Books =

Canadian independent bookstore

- Type: family business
- Industry: Books
- Founded: 1999
- Founder: Kelly Hughes
- Defunct: 2012
- Headquarters: Winnipeg, Canada
- Website: http://www.aquabooks.ca

Aqua Books was a Canadian independent bookstore opened in Winnipeg, Manitoba by Kelly Hughes in 1999. It was acknowledged for helping revitalize downtown Winnipeg and creating an eclectic mix of programs and events for the Winnipeg arts and culture community. Aqua Books closed in early 2012, and after a failed attempt to reopen in a new location, closed permanently later that year.

== Overview ==
Aqua Books consisted of a bookstore, a restaurant called Eat Bistro, writers' studios and an events theatre. Aqua sponsored the Aqua Books Lansdowne Prize for Poetry and hosts numerous literary and cultural events. Writers who have launched books or read at Aqua Books include Paul Quarrington, Susie Moloney, Shane Koyczan, Sarah Klassen, George Murray, Miriam Toews, David Bergen, Joan Thomas, Andrew Davidson, Catherine Hunter, and Margaret Christakos. Lecturers have included politician Tim Sale, musician Steve Bell and activist David Northcott. Owner Kelly Hughes hosted a live in-store talk show called Kelly Hughes Live!, which has seen visits by writer Margaret Sweatman, comedian Kevin McDonald, children's entertainer Fred Penner and actor/politician Tina Keeper.

The store was visited by journalist Noah Richler in 2009, who called it "one of the craziest, most amusing and well-ordered second-hand bookstores I have ever frequented".

== Aqua Books Lansdowne Prize for Poetry ==
Aqua Books sponsors the Aqua Books Lansdowne Prize for Poetry, which is awarded annually to the best full length adult book of poetry in either French or English by a resident of Manitoba, Canada. The Aqua Books Lansdowne Prize for Poetry Reading Series, hosted in conjunction with The Writers' Collective, is based around this award.

=== Winners ===
- 2007 — Laurie Block, Time out of Mind
- 2008 — Alison Calder, Wolf Tree
- 2009 — Rosanna Deerchild, this is a small northern town

== Writer-in-residence Program ==
Aqua Books was one of only two bookstores in Canada to feature a writer-in-residence program, the other being the University of Alberta bookstore. This program includes workshops, readings and manuscript evaluation. Writers-in-residence have included young adult writer Anita Daher, the late crime writer Michael Van Rooy, playwright Carolyn Gray and arts writer Amy Karlinsky. The first film writer-in-residence was former Alamo Drafthouse programmer Kier-La Janisse.
