= Manitoba Book Awards =

Canadian literary award

Manitoba Books Awards/Les Prix du livre du Manitoba is the premiere annual book awards for Manitoba, Canada originating in 1988. An award gala is usually held in April in Winnipeg, Manitoba, celebrating the best of Manitoba writing and publishing from the previous year. The awards went on hiatus from 2023 and returned with six awards 2026.

Depending on the year, there were several awards conferred, as some of the awards were only bestowed biannually. The awards were co-produced by the Association of Manitoba Book Publishers and the Manitoba Writers' Guild. Awards include the Eileen McTavish Sykes Award for Best First Book, the Margaret Laurence Award for Fiction, the Carol Shields Award for best Winnipeg book, the Mary Scorer Award for Best Book by a Manitoba Publisher, the Alexander Kennedy Isbister Award for Non-Fiction, the McNally Robinson Book of the Year Award and others. Past winners include Miriam Toews, David Bergen, Joan Thomas, W.P. Kinsella, Carol Shields and others.

== Winners ==
Manitoba Book Awards winners
Year	Award	Author	Title	Ref.
2007	Alexander Kennedy Isbister Award for Non-Fiction	Faith Johnston	A Great Restlessness: the Life and Politics of Dorise Nielsen	
2007	Aqua Books Lansdowne Prize for Poetry	Laurie Block	Time out of Mind	
2007	Best Illustrated Book of the Year		Early Masters: Inuit Sculpture 1949-1955	
2007	Carol Shields Winnipeg Book Award	Serena Keshavjee	Winnipeg Modern: Architecture 1945 to 1975	
2007	Eileen McTavish Sykes Award for Best First Book	Faith Johnston	A Great Restlessness: the Life and Politics of Dorise Nielsen	
2007	John Hirsch Most Promising Writer Award	Anita Daher		
2007	le Prix littéraire Rue-Deschambault	Bathélemy Bolivar	Manguiers têtus	
2007	Manuela Dias Award for Book Design	Relish Design	Going Downtown: A History of Portage Avenue	
2007	Margaret Laurence Award for Fiction	Melissa Steele	Beautiful Girl Thumb	
2007	Mary Scorer Award for Best Book by a Manitoba Publisher	Faith Johnston	A Great Restlessness: the Life and Politics of Dorise Nielsen	
2007	McNally Robinson Book for Young People Award - Older	Larry Verstraete	Lost Treasures: True Stories of Discovery	
2007	McNally Robinson Book for Young People Award - Younger	Colleen Sydor	Raise a Little Stink	
2007	McNally Robinson Book of the Year Award	Faith Johnston	A Great Restlessness: the Life and Politics of Dorise Nielsen	
2008	Alexander Kennedy Isbister Award for Non-Fiction	Jim Shilliday	Canada's Wheat King: The Life and Times of Seager Wheeler	
2008	Aqua Books Lansdowne Prize for Poetry	Alison Calder	Wolf Tree	
2008	Best Illustrated Book of the Year	Frank Reimer Design (design) and Ernest Mayer (photography)	Take Comfort: the Career of Charles Comfort	
2008	Carol Shields Winnipeg Book Award	Roland Penner	A Glowing Dream: A Memoir	
2008	Eileen McTavish Sykes Award for Best First Book	Alison Calder	Wolf Tree	
2008	John Hirsch Most Promising Writer Award	Carolyn Gray		
2008	Manuela Dias Award for Book Design	Frank Reimer Design (design) and Ernest Mayer (photography)	Take Comfort: the Career of Charles Comfort	
2008	Margaret Laurence Award for Fiction	Lois Braun	The Penance Drummer and Other Stories	
2008	Mary Scorer Award for Best Book by a Manitoba Publisher	John Paskievich	The North End: Photographs by John Paskievich	
2008	McNally Robinson Book for Young People Award - Older	Kevin Marc Fournier	Sandbag Shuffle	
2008	McNally Robinson Book of the Year	Wayne Tefs	Be Wolf	
2009	Alexander Kennedy Isbister Award for Non-Fiction	J.M. Bumsted	Lord Selkirk: A Life	
2009	Aqua Books Lansdowne Prize for Poetry	Rosanna Deerchild	this is a small northern town	
2009	Best Illustrated Book of the Year	Darlene Coward Wight and Frank Reimer	The Harry Winrob Collection of Inuit Sculpture	
2009	Carol Shields Winnipeg Book Award	André Fauchon Carol J. Harvey	Saint-Boniface 1908-2008 : reflets d'une ville	
2009	Eileen McTavish Sykes Award for Best First Book	Daria Salamon	The Prairie Bridesmaid	
2009	John Hirsch Most Promising Writer Award	Michael Van Rooy		
2009	le Prix littéraire Rue-Deschambault	Lise Gaboury-Diallo	L'endroit et l'envers	
2009	Manuela Dias Award for Book Design	Louise Duguay and Susan Chafe	Pauline Boutal, Destin d'artiste	
2009	Margaret Laurence Award for Fiction	David Bergen	The Retreat	
2009	Mary Scorer Award for Best Book by a Manitoba Publisher	Louise Duguay	Pauline Boutal, Destin d'artiste	
2009	McNally Robinson Book for Young People Award - Older	Colleen Sydor	My Mother is a French Fry and Further Proof of my Fuzzed-Up Life	
2009	McNally Robinson Book for Young People Award - Younger	Joe McLellan and Matrine McLellan	Goose Girl	
2009	McNally Robinson Book of the Year Award	David Bergen	The Retreat	
2010	Alexander Kennedy Isbister Award for Non-Fiction	Robert J. Young	An American by Degrees: The Extraordinary Lives of French Ambassador Jules Jusserand	
2010	Aqua Books Lansdowne Prize for Poetry	Jan Horner	Mama Dada	
2010	Best Illustrated Book of the Year	Gerry Kopelow	All Our Changes: Images from the Sixties Generation	
2010	Carol Shields Winnipeg Book Award	Esyllt W. Jones Gerald Friesen	Prairie Metropolis: New Essays on Winnipeg Social History	
2010	Eileen McTavish Sykes Award for Best First Book	Michael Nathanson	Talk	
2010	John Hirsch Most Promising Writer Award	Ariel Gordon		
2010	Manuela Dias Award for Book Design	Zach Pauls	Dead on Arrival: Faculty of Architecture, University of Manitoba Journal 2009	
2010	Margaret Laurence Award for Fiction	Deborah Schnitzer	an unexpected break in the weather	
2010	Mary Scorer Award for Best Book by a Manitoba Publisher	Heather Beattie and Barbara Huck	Wild West: Nature Living on the Edge	
2010	McNally Robinson Book for Young People Award - Older	Eva Wiseman	Puppet	
2010	McNally Robinson Book for Young People Award - Younger	Colleen Sydor	Timmerman Was Here	
2010	McNally Robinson Book of the Year Award	Allan Levine	Coming of Age: A History of the Jewish People of Manitoba	
2011	Alexander Kennedy Isbister Award for Non-Fiction	Emma LaRocque	When the Other Is Me: Native Resistance Discourse, 1850-1990	
2011	Aqua Books Lansdowne Prize for Poetry	Ariel Gordon	Hump	
2011	Best Illustrated Book of the Year	Greg Chomichuk and John Toone with James Rewucki	The Imagination Manifesto	
2011	Carol Shields Winnipeg Book Award	David Bergen	The Matter With Morris	
2011	Eileen McTavish Sykes Award for Best First Book	Sheila McClarty	High Speed Crow	
2011	John Hirsch Most Promising Writer Award	Michelle Elrick		
2011	Le Prix Littéraire rue-Deschambault	Lise Gaboury-Diallo	Lointaines	
2011	Manuela Dias Award for Book Design	Jess Young	A Dogs Breakfast: A Chef's Guide to Healthy Home Cooking for Your Favorite Pooch	
2011	Margaret Laurence Award for Fiction	David Bergen	The Matter With Morris	
2011	Mary Scorer Award for Best Book by a Manitoba Publisher	Michelle Berry	I Still Don't Even Know You	
2011	McNally Robinson Book for Young People Award - Older	Maureen Fergus	Ortega	
2011	McNally Robinson Book of the Year Award	Dora Dueck	This Hidden Thing	
2012	Alexander Kennedy Isbister Award for Non-Fiction	Allan Levine	King: William Lyon MacKenzie King: A Life Guided by the Hand of Destiny	
2012	Aqua Books Lansdowne Prize for Poetry	J. R. Léveillé	Poème Pierre Prière	
2012	Best Illustrated Book of the Year	Miriam Rudolph	David's Trip to Paraguay: The Land of Amazing Colours	
2012	Carol Shields Winnipeg Book Award	Sandi Krawchenko Altner	Ravenscraig	
2012	Eileen McTavish Sykes Award for Best First Book	Sue Sorensen	A Large Harmonium	
2012	John Hirsch Most Promising Writer Award	Jennifer Still		
2012	Manuela Dias Award for Book Design	J. R. Léveillé	Poème Pierre Prière	
2012	Margaret Laurence Award for Fiction	Alison Preston	The Girl in the Wall	
2012	Mary Scorer Award for Best Book by a Manitoba Publisher	W. P. Kinsella	Butterfly Winter	
2012	McNally Robinson Book for Young People Award - Older	Colleen Nelson	Tori by Design	
2012	McNally Robinson Book for Young People Award - Younger	Larry Verstraete	S is for Scientists: A Discovery Alphabet	
2012	McNally Robinson Book of the Year Award	Esmé Claire Keith	Not Being on a Boat	
2012	Michael Van Rooy Award for Genre Fiction	Susie Moloney	The Thirteen	
2013	Alexander Kennedy Isbister Award for Non-Fiction	Darlene Coward Wight	Creation and Transformation: Defining Moments in Inuit Art	
2013	Aqua Books Lansdowne Prize for Poetry	Jonathan Ball	The Politics of Knives	
2013	Best Illustrated Book of the Year	Esyllt Jones	Imagining Winnipeg: History through the Photographs of L.B. Foote	
2013	Carol Shields Winnipeg Book Award	David Bergen	The Age of Hope	
2013	Eileen McTavish Sykes Award for Best First Book	Kristian Enright	Sonar	
2013	John Hirsch Most Promising Writer Award	Kristian Enright		
2013	Le Prix Littéraire rue-Deschambault	Raymond M. Hebert	La Révolution Tranquille	
2013	Lifetime Achievement Award	Dennis Cooley		
2013	Manuela Dias Award for Book Design	Nicole Hunt and Brandon Bergem	Warehouse Journal Vol. 21	
2013	Margaret Laurence Award for Fiction	David Bergen	The Age of Hope	
2013	Mary Scorer Award for Best Book by a Manitoba Publisher	Chadwick Ginther	Thunder Road	
2013	McNally Robinson Book for Young People Award - Older	Kevin Marc Fournier	The Green-Eyed Queen of Suicide City	
2013	McNally Robinson Book of the Year Award	Meira Cook	The House on Sugarbush Road	
2021	Alexander Kennedy Isbister Award for Non-Fiction	David Robertson	Black Water: Family, Legacy, and Blood Money	
2021	Book Design	Julie Nagam (editor)	Becoming Our Future: Global Indigenous Curatorial Practice	
2021	Carol Shields Winnipeg Book Award	David Robertson	Black Water: Family, Legacy, and Blood Money	
2021	Chris Johnson Award for Best Play by a Manitoba Playwright	Lara Rae	Dragonfly	
2021	Eileen McTavish Sykes Award for Best First Book	Andrew Unger	Once Removed	
2021	Graphic Novel	Kateri Akiwenzie-Damm et al.	This Place: 150 Years Retold	
2021	Illustration	Lisa Boivin	I Will See You Again	
2021	Le Prix Littéraire rue-Deschambault	Amber O'Reilly	Boussole Franche	
2021	Manitowapow Award	Duncan Mercredi and Lenard Monkman		
2021	Margaret Laurence Award for Fiction	Jonathan Ball	The Lightning of Possible Storms	
2021	Mary Scorer Award for Best Book by a Manitoba Publisher	Magdalene Redekop	Making Believe: Questions about Mennonites and Art	
2021	McNally Robinson Book for Young People Award - Older	Colleen Nelson	Harvey Comes Home	
2021	McNally Robinson Book of the Year Award	David Bergen	Here the Dark	
2022	Alexander Kennedy Isbister Award for Non-Fiction	Helen Olsen Agger	Dadibaajim: Returning Home through Narrative	
2022	Carol Shields Winnipeg Book Award	Seream	Mont-Blanc-Winnipeg Express	
2022	Eileen McTavish Sykes Award for Best First Book	Rowan McCandless	Persephone's Children: A Life in Fragments	
2022	Co-winner, Eileen McTavish Sykes Award for Best First Book	Jillian Horton	We Are All Perfectly Fine: A Memoir of Love, Medicine and Healing	
2022	John Hirsch Emerging Manitoba Writer Award	Chimwemwe Undi		
2022	Manuela Dias Book Design and Illustration Awards: Book Design	Chelsea Colburn & Teresa Lyons	Warehouse Journal, Volume Thirty	
2022	Manuela Dias Book Design and Illustration Awards: Illustration	Category held over until 2023		
2022	Manuela Dias Book Design and Illustration Awards: Children's Illustration	Brenlee Coates, illustrations by Roberta Landreth	You Came From My Heart	
2022	Lansdowne Prize for Poetry	Joel Robert Ferguson	The Lost Cafeteria	
2022	Margaret Laurence Award for Fiction	Patricia Roberston	Hour of the Crab	
2022	Co-winner, Margaret Laurence Award for Fiction	Bob Armstrong	Prodigies	
2022	Mary Scorer Award for Best Book by a Manitoba Publisher	Ed. by Andrew Woolford, authors Survivors of the Assiniboia Indian Residential School	Did you See Us?: Reunion, Remembrance, and Reclamation at an Urban Indian Residential School	
2022	Michael Van Rooy Award for Genre Fiction	Catherine Macdonald	So Many Windings: A Reverened Charles Lauchlan Mystery	
2022	McNally Robinson Book of the Year Award	David Bergen	Out of Mind	
2022	McNally Robinson Book for Young People (Younger Category)	Tasha Spillett-Sumner	I Sang You Down from the Stars	
2022	Le Prix littéraire Rue-Deschambault	Amber O'Reilly	Boussole Franche	
2023	Alexander Kennedy Isbister Award for Non-Fiction	Meeka Walsh	Malleable Forms: Selected Essays	
2023	Carol Shields Winnipeg Book Award	David A. Robertson	The Theory of Crows	
2023	Eileen McTavish Sykes Award for Best First Book	Linda Trinh, illustrations by Clayton Nguyen	The Secret of the Jade Bangle	
2023	Co-winner, Eileen McTavish Sykes Award for Best First Book	Jonathan Dyck	Shelterbelts	
2023	Manitowapow Award	CO-WINNERS: William Dumas, David A. Robertson, Joshua Whitehead		
2023	Manuela Dias Book Design and Illustration Awards: Book Design	Alieha Pascua, Dave Castillo, & Joanna Babadilla	Warehouse Journal, Volume 31	
2023	Manuela Dias Book Design and Illustration Awards: Illustration	Jackie Traverse, foreword by Gramma Shingoose, illustration by Jackie Traverse, cover and interior design by Melody Morrissette	Resilience: Honouring the Children of Residential Schools	
2023	Manuela Dias Book Design and Illustration Awards: Graphic Novel	David A. Robertson, illustrations by Scott B. Henderson, colouring by Donovan Yaciuk, lettering by Andrew Thomas, cover and interior design by Jennifer Lum	Version Control	
2023	Lansdowne Prize for Poetry	Sarah Ens	The World Is Mostly Sky	
2023	Margaret Laurence Award for Fiction	Méira Cook	The Full Catastrophe	
2023	Mary Scorer Award for Best Book by a Manitoba Publisher	Elizabeth Yeoman, cover design by David Drummond	Exactly What I Said: Translating Words and Worlds	
2023	McNally Robinson Book for Young People (Younger Category)	Primrose Madayag Knazan	Lessions in Fusion	
2023	Co-Winner, McNally Robinson Book for Young People (Younger Category)	David A. Robertson	The Stone Child: The Misewa Saga, Book Three	
2023	McNally Robinson Book of the Year Award	Jonathan Dyck	Shelterbetls	
2023	Le Prix littéraire Rue-Deschambault	Lise Gaboury Diallo	Petites déviations	
2024	Awards placed on hiatus, November 2023			
2026	Margaret Laurence Award for Fiction	Zilla Jones	The World So Wide	
2026	Lansdowne Prize for Poetry	Chimwemwe Undi	Scientific Marvel	
2026	Alexander Kennedy Isbister Award For Non-Fiction	Linda Trinh	Seeking Spirit: A Vietnamese (Non)Buddhist Memoir	
2026	Prix littéraire Rue-Deschambault	J.R. Léveillé	Poésie franco-ouestienne, 1974-2024	
2026	Carol Shields Winnipeg Book Award	Kevin Nikke	Founding Folks: An Oral History of the Winnipeg Folk Festival	
2026	Eileen McTavish Sykes Award for Best First Book	Cale Plett	Wavelength	
