= Linda Holeman =

Canadian author

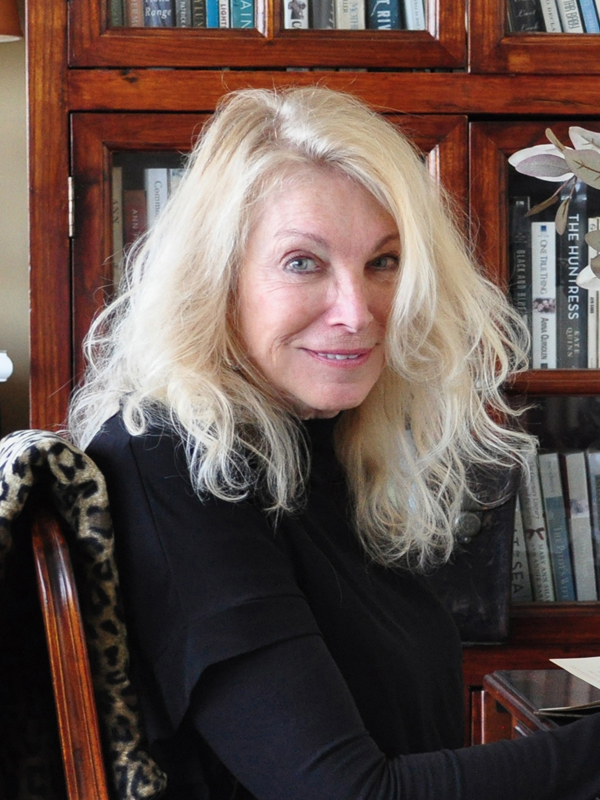
- Born: Linda Freeman; Winnipeg, Manitoba, Canada
- Education: University of Winnipeg (B.A.); University of Manitoba (B.Ed., M.Ed.)
- Children: 3
- Awards: McNally Robinson Book for Young People Award (2000, 2002)
- Website: lindaholeman.com

Linda Holeman (née Freeman; born in Winnipeg, Manitoba) is a Canadian author of fiction.

== Personal life and education ==
Holeman was born in Winnipeg, Manitoba. She received a Bachelor of Arts in sociology and psychology from the University of Winnipeg in 1972, then attended the University of Manitoba, where she received a Bachelor of Education in 1975 and Master of Education in 1982.

She currently lives and writes in Toronto, Ontario. She has three children: Zalie, Brenna, Kitt.

== Career ==
=== Education ===
Holeman taught in the Frontier School Division in northern Manitoba in the mid-70s, after which she taught in the Fort Garry School Division in Winnipeg. In the 1990s, she taught at the University of Winnipeg and University of Manitoba. Later, she was a writer-in-residence at the Winnipeg Public Library.

=== Writing ===
Holeman is the author of fourteen books of fiction, which have sold millions of copies worldwide. Her work has been translated into twenty languages, and includes two adult collections of literary short stories, Flying to Yellow and Devil's Darning Needle, as well as the historical novels The Linnet Bird, The Moonlit Cage, In A Far Country, The Saffron Gate, The Lost Souls of Angelkov, and The Devil On Her Tongue. Her particular interest in writing historical fiction is demonstrating the plight of women in the 18th and 19th centuries, from the point of view of strongly drawn female protagonists. She travels widely to research her novels in great depth, and her ability to capture place and era has consistently met with positive critical review. Amnesty International UK has chosen The Moonlit Cage as one of the "Ten Great Books on Human Rights", along with To Kill a Mockingbird, 1984, The Help, and Mosquito.

Her young adult body of work consists of a collection of short stories, Saying Good-Bye, which was re-released as Toxic Love, and four novels: Promise Song, Mercy's Birds, Raspberry House Blues, and Search of the Moon King's Daughter. She has also written a first-chapter book for younger readers, Frankie on the Run. Linda has been the recipient of numerous awards, honours and nominations for her young adult work.

As well as being published in many journals and periodicals, Holeman's short stories have been widely anthologized in Canada – most noticeably in The Journey Prize Anthology – and abroad. She was twice short-listed for the CBC Literary Competition, and won the Larry Turner Award for Non-Fiction, the Canadian Author/Winnipeg Free Press Non-Fiction Competition, and the Canadian Living Magazine National Writing Competition.

Linda acted as guest editor for a young adult issue of Prairie Fire Magazine, for which she was awarded the Vicky Metcalf Short Story Editor Award. She has been a member of the Manitoba Artists in the Schools Program and CANSCAIP, toured with the Canadian Children's Book Centre, acted as a mentor in the Manitoba Writers' Guild Mentor Program, and taught creative writing through the University of Winnipeg's Continuing Education Programme. She has served on a number of juries across Canada, including the Governor-General's Award for Children's Literature, and created and facilitated writing workshops on many aspects of the writing process to both students and adults nationally and internationally. She held a nine-month term as Writer-in-Residence at the Millennium Library in Winnipeg, and served on the editorial advisory board for Turnstone Press and on the board of the Manitoba Writers' Guild. She is a member of the Writers' Union of Canada.

== Awards and honours ==
Awards for Holeman's writing
Year	Title	Result	Award
1997	Promise Song	Geoffrey Bilson Award	Finalist
1998	Promise Song	Forest of Reading Red Maple Award	Finalist
1999	Mercy's Birds	Forest of Reading Red Maple Award	Finalist
2000	Raspberry House Blues	McNally Robinson Book for Young People Award	Winner
2001	Raspberry House Blues	Forest of Reading Red Maple Award	Finalist
2002	Search of the Moon King's Daughter	McNally Robinson Book for Young People Award	Winner
2003	Search of the Moon King's Daughter	Geoffrey Bilson Award	Finalist

== Publications ==
- Saying Good-Bye. Toronto, ON: Lester Publishing (1995). ISBN 1-895555-47-7

- Republished as Toxic Love. Toronto, ON: Tundra Books (2003). ISBN 978-0887766473

- Frankie on the Run. Toronto, ON: Boardwalk Books (1995). ISBN 978-1895681093
- Flying to Yellow. Winnipeg, MB: Turnstone Press (1996). ISBN 0-88801-203-9
- Promise Song. Toronto, ON: Tundra Books (1997). ISBN 0-88776-387-1
- Mercy's Birds. Toronto, ON: Tundra Books (1998). ISBN 0-88776-463-0
- Devil's Darning Needle. Erin, ON: The Porcupine's Quill (1999). ISBN 0-88984-205-1
- Raspberry House Blues. Toronto, ON: Tundra Books (2000). ISBN 0-88776-493-2
- Search of the Moon King's Daughter. Toronto, ON: Tundra Books (2002). ISBN 0-88776-592-0
- The Linnet Bird. London, England: Headline Publishers (2004). ISBN 978-0-7553-2463-7
- The Moonlit Cage. London, England: Headline Publishers (2006). ISBN 978-0-7553-2856-7
- In a Far Country. London, England: Headline Publishers (2008). ISBN 978-0-7553-4507-6
- The Saffron Gate. London, England: Headline Publishers (2009). ISBN 978-0-7553-3111-6
- The Lost Souls of Angelkov. Toronto, ON: Random House Canada (2012). ISBN 978-0-307-36159-2
- The Devil On Her Tongue. Toronto, ON: Random House Canada (2014). ISBN 978-0-307-36162-2

== Sources ==
- The 49th Shelf: Beyond Borders: Linda Holeman on Travel and Writing. Kerry Clare, August 8, 2012
- "Beyond Borders: Linda Holeman on Travel and Writing". 49thshelf.com.
- Open Book Toronto: On Writing, with Linda Holeman. August 7, 2012
- "On Writing, with Linda Holeman | Open Book: Toronto". openbooktoronto.com. Archived from the original on May 18, 2014.
- Justine's Bookend Review, Justine Lewkowicz, August 3, 2012
- "Newstalk 1010 – In-Depth Radio :: Interview: The Lost Souls of Angelkov :: Bookends Review with Justine Lewkowicz Book Reviews – Feed Story Book Reviews – Feed Story". newstalk1010.com.
- Winnipeg Free Press: Holeman Captivates with Russian Tale. Jennifer Ryan, July 7, 2012
- "Holeman captivates with Russian tale". Winnipeg Free Press.
- Globe and Mail: Serfs Up: A Novel of Angst in 19th Century Russia. Candace Fertile, July 24, 2012
- "Serfs up: A novel of angst in 19th-century Russia". The Globe and Mail. July 24, 2012.
- Winnipeg Free Press: Holeman's Female Protagonists Take Time Growing Into Roles. Carolin Vesely, July 26, 2012
- "Holeman's female protagonists take time growing into roles". Winnipeg Free Press.
