= Black Water (memoir) =

2020 Cree memoir by David Robertson

- Author: David Robertson
- Language: English
- Genre: Memoir
- Publisher: HarperCollins
- Publication date: September 22, 2020
- Publication place: Canada
- Media type: Print
- Awards: Carol Shields Winnipeg Book Award (2021)

Black Water: Family, Legacy, and Blood Memory is a memoir written by David A. Robertson, published September 22, 2020 by HarperCollins.

== Plot ==
In Black Water, Robertson explores his family history as he came to know and connect with his Cree ancestry.

Robertson was born to a Cree father (Don) and non-Indigenous mother (Beverly). Despite his ancestry, Don didn't have official Indigenous status, though he grew up near Norway House, Manitoba, living off the land learning Cree culture. Ten years after his birth, the Family Allowances Act of 1945, which promised welfare to Indigenous peoples with a permanent address, changed his family's life. Although they received government benefits, they could no longer work the traplines. Shortly after, Don attended public school and forgot his native Swampy Cree language.

After becoming a pastor, Don met and married Beverly, and the couple had three sons. Together, Don and Beverly decided not to tell their sons about their Indigenous ancestry because they felt the "knowledge of their Swampy Cree roots would be a burden for them." The family lived in Winnipeg without connection to other Cree people. After his parents divorce, Robertson spent little time with his family for nearly a decade.

Robertson eventually reconnected with his father, at which point he learned about his family's heritage. With Don, he travelled to Norway House multiple times and reconnected with his history.

Black Water is structured around Robertson's journey to connecting with his heritage, the land, and his father. The memoir also explores Robertson's anxiety and growth regarding his own Indigenous identity.

The book's central themes are conveyed in the subtitle (i.e., family, legacy, and blood memory), though "Robertson also addresses a variety of subjects, including anxiety, veganism, the legacy of lost language, the impact Family Allowance had on his father’s family, and visiting family in a small Mennonite town." Importantly, Robertson also "carefully and thoughtfully acknowledges that his experience is not a monolith and Indigenous folks experiences may vary vastly from his."

== Background ==
While Robertson was working on the books' final draft, his father died. Although he contemplated writing his father's death into the book, he felt that the detail would require the entire book to be restructured given that the main focus is the rekindled relationship.

== Style ==
Although Black Water is a memoir, Robertson "wanted it to read like as engaging as a strong fictional narrative." Because of this, he "weav[es] in his and his father’s visit to the trapline with memories and reflections" in a manner uncommon in the genre.

== Reception ==
Black Water was generally well-received, including a five-star review from Falling Letters, who called the book's tone "exemplary," saying, "Robertson writes in a way that feels calming and quiet, even as he slices to the heart of important matters." Ultimately, the reviewer said the book was a "masterful memoir" and "one of Robertson's strongest works."

Writing for the Whistler Writers Festival, Nicola Bentley highlighted how "Robertson deftly weaves several powerful and societally relevant themes together..., skillfully layer[ing] the dark history of residential schools with his father’s inspiring story as a minister, dedicated Indigenous advocate and tireless educator." Bentley referred to the memoir as "an adventure story, a travel-memoir, a dedication, and a richly rewarding read," ultimately calling it "truthful, emotional, sad and joyful and a truly beautiful read."

Priscilla Kipp in a review for BookPage, wrote, "Claiming one’s heritage, learning where 'home' truly is, is an oft-told tale, but Robertson infuses his story with a wisdom that binds his own discoveries to the common experience of sharing family legacies with future generations. Memory is a gift we owe our children, he says. Listen to your own storytellers and hold them close while you can."

Black Water was included in "Best of the Year" lists from Quill & Quire, Globe and Mail, and CBC Books.

Awards for Black Water
Year	Award	Result	Ref.
2021	Alexander Kennedy Isbister Award for Non-Fiction	Winner	
2021	Carol Shields Winnipeg Book Award	Winner	
2021	First Nations Communities Read Award for YA/Adult	Shortlist	
2021	High Plains Book Award for Creative Nonfiction	Winner	
