= Time Out of Mind =

Time Out of Mind may refer to:

- Time immemorial, a legal concept and the origin of the phrase

== Film ==
- Time Out of Mind (1947 film), a film starring Phyllis Calvert and Robert Hutton
- Time Out of Mind (1968 film), a Verity Films documentary
- Time Out of Mind (2014 film), a film starring Richard Gere

== Theater ==
- Time Out of Mind (play), a play by Bridget Boland

== Literature ==
- Time Out of Mind, a 1935 book by Rachel Field
- Time Out of Mind, a 1956 book by Joan Grant
- Time Out of Mind, a 1973 book by John Middleton Murry Jr. (as Richard Cowper) and W.R. Cowper
- Time Out of Mind, a 1999 book by Leonard Michaels
- Time Out of Mind, a 2006 book of poetry by Laurie Block

== Music ==
- Time Out of Mind (Bob Dylan album), 1997
- Time Out of Mind (Grover Washington Jr. album), 1989
- Time Out of Mind, an album by Troubleman (Mark Pritchard), 2004
- "Time Out of Mind" (Steely Dan song), 1980

== Television ==
- "Time Out of Mind", an episode of Mannix
- "Time Out of Mind", an episode of La Femme Nikita
- "Time Out of Mind", an episode of Andromeda
- "Time Out of Mind", an episode of Medium
- "Time Out of Mind", an episode of Odyssey 5
