= Manitoba Day Award =

The Manitoba Day Award is an award presented yearly, since 2007, by the Association for Manitoba Archives which recognizes those users of archives who have completed an original work of excellence that enhances the archival community and contributes to the understanding and celebration of Manitoba history. These works can be fiction or non-fiction and can be in a variety of media, including audio and film. The deadline for nomination is normally March of each year with the award being granted in May.

Past winners include:

== 2022 ==
Popular Publication: Gordon McDiarmid. We Were Builders from Scotland.

Scholarly Publication (Two Winners): Chantal Fiola. Returning to Ceremony | Loewen Royden. Mennonite Farmers.

Exhibition/Project: Riva Symko. The Alloways' Gift | Rosalie Favell's Family Legacy.

== 2021 ==
Book/Publication: Susie Fisher, Frieda Esau Klippenstein, Roland Sawatzky, and Conrad Stoesz. Mennonite Village Photography

Book/Publication: Steve Heinrichs and Esther Epp-Tiessen (ed.). Be It Resolved

Exhibition/Project: Mary Jane McCallum and Erin Millions. “Indigenous Afternoons in the Archives [of Manitoba]"

Film/Theatre: Sabrina Janke and Alex Judge. “One Great History (podcast)”

== 2020 ==
Book/Publication: David Spector, Assiniboine Park: Designing and Developing a People’s Playground (Great Plains Publications)

Book/Publication: Jean Teillet, The North-West Is Our Mother: The Story of Louis Riel’s People, The Métis Nation (HarperCollins Canada)

Exhibition/Project: Adele Perry’s University of Manitoba History 3442 class blog

Exhibition/Project: Mariia Kryvosheieva’s exhibit at the Ukrainian Cultural and Educational Centre (Oseredok), from January 21 to March 3, 2020 titled “Manitoba Pioneers: The First Steps.”

Film/Theatre: Andrew Wall of Refuge 31 films documentary “Volendam: A Refugee Story”

== 2019 ==
=== Publication ===
Lucienne Beaudry Loiselle, Le Festival du Voyageur Hé Ho!: Une célébration de culture et de patrimoine

=== Exhibition/Project ===
Sarah Story, Victor Harper, Emma Harper, Connie Singleterry, Bear Lake Stevenson River Knowledge Preservation Project

=== Film/Theatre ===
StrongFront.tv, Urban Eclipse: Rising Tides of Kekekoziibii.

== 2018 ==
=== Publication ===
Barbara Mitchell, Mapmaker: Philip Turnor in Rupert's Land in the Age of Enlightenment

Kathryn A. Young and Sarah M. McKinnon, No Man's Land: The Life and Art of Mary Riter Hamilton

=== Exhibition ===
Andrea Martin and Tyyne Petrowski, Voices from Vimy: Manitobans on the Ridge

=== Film/Theatre ===
Maureen Hunter, Sarah Ballenden

== 2017 ==
=== Publication ===
C. Nathan Hatton, Thrashing Seasons: Sporting Culture in Manitoba and the Genesis of Prairie Wrestling (UofM Press: 2016)

Bernard Mulaire, Caricatures (Éditions du blé: 2016)

=== Film/Theatre ===
Andrew Wall, The Last Objectors, 2016

== 2016 ==
=== Publication ===
Dr. Stephen Haddelsey, Operation Tabarin: Britain’s Secret Wartime Expedition to Antarctica, 1944–46

Mary Jane McCallum, Indigenous Women, Work and History 1940-1980

Ernest N. Braun and Glen R. Klassen, Historical Atlas of the East Reserve

Glen Suggett and Gordon Goldsborough, Delta: A Prairie Marsh and Its People

Dale Gibson, Law, Life, and Government at Red River (Volume 1 & 2)

Orest Martynowych, The Showman and the Ukrainian Cause: Folk Dance, Film and the Life of Vasile Avramenko

Jacqueline Blay, volumes 1 and 2 of a 5 volume set on French history in Manitoba. Volume 1: Sous le ciel de la Prairie, des débuts à 1870 & Volume 2: Le temps des outrages (1870-1916)

=== Exhibition/Project ===
Kristin Tresoor, Dr. Morley Cohen Plaque and Exhibit at Cardiac Sciences Unit, St. Boniface Hospital

Christy Henry, Eileen Trott, Graham Street, and Morganna Maylon, “Gowen’s Brandon – Then & Now”

Dr. Roland Sawatzky, Manitoba Museum, “Nice Women Don’t Want the Vote”

Mennonite Heritage Centre, a founding partner of the Mennonite Archival Image Database (MAID) website

== 2015 ==
=== Publication ===
Randy Turner and Melissa Tait, City Beautiful: How Architecture Shaped Winnipeg’s DNA

Jody Perrun, The Patriotic Consensus: Unity, Morale, and the Second World War in Winnipeg

Dr. Royden Loewen, Village Among Nations: “Canadian” Mennonites in a Transnational World, 1916-2006

Rev. Dr. Athanasius D. McVay, God’s Martyr, History’s Witness: Blessed Nykyta Budka, the First Ukrainian Catholic Bishop of Canada

=== Exhibition/Project ===
Suyoko Tsukamoto, “Brandon College and the Great War” exhibit

Will Woodward, Education curriculum project which looked at the role of women in the First World War and Canada’s contribution to the war effort

Kristin Tresoor, BMO in Winnipeg

The Aboriginal Advisory Committee, Preserving the History of Aboriginal Institutional Development in Winnipeg

=== Film/Theatre ===
Kevin Nikkel, Romance of the Far Fur Country and On the Trail of the Far Fur Country

Ryan McKenna, Controversies

== 2014 ==
=== Publication ===
Carol Matas, Pieces of the Past: The Holocaust Diary of Rose Rabinowitz

Michael Payne, Ted Binnema, and Gerhard Ens, Edmonton House Journals, Correspondence & Reports, 1806-1821

Esther Epp-Tiessen, Mennonite Central Committee in Canada: A History

Nick Ternette, Rebel Without a Pause: A Memoir (awarded posthumously)

Diane Truderung, Transcona's Story - 100 Years of Progress

=== Exhibition/Project ===
Abigail Auld, WPGxHBC project

Annie Langlois and Thomas Bres, Ma langue, Ma Liberté exhibit

Rev. Dr. Loraine MacKenzie Shepherd, "From Colonization to Right Relations: The Evolution of United Church of Canada Missions within Aboriginal Communities" essay & study curriculum

Dr. Caryn Douglas, “Deaconess History of the United Church of Canada” website, www.uccdeaconesshistory.ca

=== Film/Theatre ===
Aaron Floresco and Rhonda Hinther, The Ukrainian Labour Temple film

== 2013 ==
=== Publication ===
John C. Lehr, Community and Frontier: A Ukrainian Settlement in the Canadian Parkland

Shannon Stunden Bower, Wet Prairie: People, Land and Water in Agricultural Manitoba

Bernard Bocquel, Les Fidèles à Riel: 125 ans d’évolution de l’Union nationale métisse Saint-Joseph du Manitoba

Bruce Owen, “Mayhem Under Main” Winnipeg Free Press article

University of Manitoba Press, “Lost Foote Photos” blog, http://lostfootephotos.blogspot.ca

=== Exhibition/Project ===
Matt Henderson, Because of a Hat project and book at St John’s Ravenscourt high school

Barb Flemington, translate, art project on 100 year old chalkboard slate paired with archival photographs from the S.J. McKee Archives

== 2012 ==
=== Publication ===
Dale Barbour, Winnipeg Beach: Leisure and Courtship in a Resort Town, 1900-1967

Grace Evans, Donna Royer, and Sally Ito, editors, A Manifest Presence: 100 Years at St. Margaret’s

Audrhea Lande, With Love To You All, Bogga S: : Stories and Letters from the Remarkable Life of Sigurbjorg Stefansson

Joe Mackintosh, Andy Dejarlis: The Life and Music of an Old-Time Fiddler

Dr. Arthur J. Ray, Telling it to the Judge: Taking Native History to Court

Dr Jaroslav Z. Skira and Dr. Karim Schelkens, The Second Vatican Council Diaries of Metropolitan Maxim Hermaniuk, C.Ss.R (1960-1965)

Ron Stevens, Much Ado About Squat: Squatters and Homesteaders Ravage Riding Mountain Forest

Robert Sweeney, Portraits of Winnipeg: The River City in Pen and Ink

=== Exhibition/Project ===
Arnie Neufeld and Bruce Wiebe, Stones and Stories project

Gail Sawatsky and Bev Friesen, Mennonite Women Evolving project

=== Film/Theatre ===
Danny Schur, Mike’s Bloody Saturday film

Andrew Wall, The Paper Nazis film

=== Musical Album ===
John K. Samson, Provincial album

== 2011 ==
=== Publication ===
Jim Blanchard, Winnipeg's Great War: A City Comes of Age

Ronald Friesen, Pioneers of Cheese: A Social and Economic History of the Cheese Industry in Southern Manitoba, 1880-1960

Pauline Greenhill, Make the Night Hideous: Four English Canadian Charivaris, 1881-1940

Harold Jantz, Leaders Who Shaped Us: Canadian Mennonite Brethren, 1910-2010

Reinhold Kramer and Tom Mitchelle, When the State Trembled: How A.J. Andrews and the Citizen's Committee Broke the Winnipeg General Strike

Alison R. Marshall, The Way of the Bachelor

=== Film/Theatre ===
Chris Charney (Farpoint Films), Musical Ghosts

Richard Stringer, The Bishop Who Ate His Boots

== 2010 ==
=== Publication ===
Randy Rostecki, Armstrong's Point: A History

Jennifer S.H. Brown and Susan Elaine Gray, Memories, Myths and Dreams of an Ojibwe Leader: William Berens, as told to A. Irving Hallowell

David G. McCrady, Living with Strangers: the Nineteenth-Century Sioux and the Canadian-American Borderlands

Health Sciences Centre, Editorial Committee, Healing & Hope: A History of the Health Sciences Centre, Winnipeg

=== Exhibition/Project ===
Susan MacWilliam, Flammarion

Roger Godard, Identifying the Manitoba leg of the Dawson Trail

Council of the Town of Carberry (Wayne Blair, Mayor, and Councillors Lin Mann, Stuart Olmstead, Barry Anderson, and Dale Aitken, Establishment of the Commercial Main Street Heritage Conservation District of the Town of Carberry

== 2009 ==
=== Publication ===
J. M. Bumsted, Lord Selkirk: A Life

Owen Clark, Musical Ghosts: Manitoba's Jazz and Dance Bands, 1914-1966

Louise Duguay and Les Éditions du blé, Pauline Boutal: Destin d'artiste

André Fauchon and Carol J. Harvey, Saint-Boniface, 1908-2008: Reflets d'une ville

Gordon Goldsborough, With One Voice: A History of Municipal Government in Manitoba

Teyana Neufeld, Vantage Points: A Collection of Stories from Southwest Manitoba, Vol. 1

Christina Penner, Windows of Hamilton House

Donna Sutherland, Nahoway: A Distant Voice

=== Film/Theatre ===
Paula Kelly, Souvenirs (a trio of short films)

Jeff McKay, 40 Years of One Night Stands: The Story of Canada's Royal Winnipeg Ballet

== 2008 ==
=== Publication ===
Dr. Gerald Bedford, The University of Winnipeg, Volume II: The First Forty Years (1967-2007)

Dr. Jennifer Brown and Margaret Anne Lindsay, The History of the Pimicikamak People to the Treaty Five Period

Dr. Esyllt Jones, Influenza 1918: Disease, Death and Struggle in Winnipeg

Anne Molgat, Claude DeMoissac, Georges Druwé, Lettres des tranchées

Deidre Simmons, Keepers of the Record: The History of the Hudson's Bay Company Archives

Jack Bumsted, St. John's College: Faith and Education in Western Canada

Susan Gray, I will Fear No Evil: Ojibwa-Missionary Encounters Along the Berens River, 1875-1940

John J. Friesen, Building Communities: The Changing Face of Manitoba Mennonites

Guillermo Quinonez, A Study of Medical Specialization: The History of the Department of Pathology of the Winnipeg General Hospital (1883-1957)

== 2007 ==
=== Exhibition/Project ===
Russ Gourluck, selection of photographs for "The Encyclopedia of Manitoba"

Lorne Coulson, Images of the North

Donna Jacobs and Kat Polischuk, Access Transcona Wall Murals: Transcona Community History

=== Film/Theatre ===
Dr. Peter Letkemann, The Ben Horch Story

Carolyn Gray, The Elmwood Visitation

Ora Walker, Transcona Remembers (DVD Documentary)
