= The Retreat (Bergen novel) =

2008 novel by David Bergen

- The Retreat book cover
- Author: David Bergen
- Language: English
- Genre: Novel
- Publisher: McClelland & Stewart
- Publication date: 9 September 2008
- Publication place: Canada
- Media type: Print

The Retreat is a 2008 English-language novel by Canadian author David Bergen. It was published by McClelland & Stewart and won the McNally Robinson Book of the Year Award in 2009. The novel depicts the relations between and among a white woman and aboriginal men.

== Plot ==
The story takes place in 1970s when the Ojibwe occupied the Anicinabe Park in Kenora at a community called "The Retreat" in a remote island. The community is run by Doctor Amos, who treats his psychiatric patients in an unconventional way in a sanctuary like place he has created. Raymond Saymour, who is eighteen years old, and his younger brother Nelson belong to the native Ojibwe community. They have met each other after a long time as Nelson had been adopted by a white family. The Byrd family visits The Retreat for rehabilitation of Mrs. Byrd. They have four children, eldest daughter Lizzy of seventeen years old takes care of the youngest two brothers Fish and William. The fourteen-year-old son Everett is in his pubescent age and is in a dilemma about his sexual orientation. Every day when Doctor Amos bathes naked in a pond just outside the Retreat, Everett watches him hiding in the bushes and fancies him. Mr. Byrd does not think much good of this non-conventional method of treating his wife but nevertheless stays just to give his family another trial to get back to normalcy. Fish, the youngest and four-year old, wanders and gets lost a couple of times bring the whole family to toes. A crippled writer Harris befriends all the kids and is unaware of the affair his wife has started with another visitor of the retreat. Raymond, on the other hand fancies white girls and always invites law enforcement officers due to some or the other act of his. Lizzy falls in love with Raymond even after knowing how he keeps getting caught by police. But that stealth on the other hand proves to be the attraction point for her in their relationship. The novel ends with tensions between the Ojibwe brothers Raymond and Nelson and Raymond and Lizzy not being able to unite the two different world they both live in.

== Publication and development ==
The novel was first published on 9 September 2008 by McClelland & Stewart. It was edited by Ellen Seligman. In an interview with McNally Robinson, Bergen mentioned that The Retreat "is more political and more about the divide between children and adults". Bergen considers his research for novel to be "more of a personal, lifelong experience that he drew upon as a writer".

== Reviews and reception ==
Richard Wagamese in his review criticised Bergen for presenting "little of the racial tension that could be smelled in the air like cordite". Canadian author and critic Geoff Pevere in his The Toronto Star review criticed novel's narrative tone and mentioned that it is "long on incident and short on joy".

The novel won the McNally Robinson Book of the Year Award in 2009. Berger had earlier won the award in 1996 for A Year of Lesser and in 2005 for The Time in Between. The award is associated with $5,000 cash remunerations. It also won the cash prize of $3,500 associated with the Margaret Laurence Award for Fiction. The novel was longlisted for the Scotiabank Giller Prize which eventually was presented to Through Black Spruce by Joseph Boyden while being adjudged by Margaret Atwood, Bob Rae, and Colm Toibin.
