= Manitoba Writers' Guild =

- Formation: August 1981; 44 years ago
- Headquarters: 100 Arthur St, Winnipeg, Manitoba
- Website: mbwriters.ca

The Manitoba Writers' Guild (MWG) is a not-for-profit professional association that represents professional and emerging writers in Manitoba, Canada.

The MWG's primary aim is to promote and advance the art of writing, in all its forms, throughout Manitoba. It formerly had an official publication, a quarterly magazine called WordWrap.

The Guild organizes many events during the year, such as the Manitoba Book Awards (with McNally Robinson booksellers), as well as administering several critique circles, public readings programs, the Sheldon Oberman Mentorship Program, and educational sessions for writers. For many years, they also ran the Patricia Blondal Memorial Writers' Retreat near Gimli, Manitoba, every summer.

The Manitoba Writers' Guild office is in the Artspace Building in the Exchange District in downtown Winnipeg, but in 2018 had to abandon most of its office space due to funding cuts.

== History ==
The guild was inaugurated in August 1981 in Aubigny, Manitoba, as a grassroots organization by and for Manitoba writers. That year, the guild attracted 18 founding members. The MWG was incorporated the following year, on February 11, 1982, as a not-for-profit corporation.

In 1986, when a group of Manitoba literary and visual artists gathered to form Artspace Inc., MWG moved its office into its current location at 100 Arthur Street in Winnipeg’s Exchange District, along with a handful of founding Artspace members. The guild began sharing space in a large area on the second floor with the Manitoba Association of Playwrights, the Canadian Book Information Centre and, eventually, Prairie Fire Press.

In 1991, the MWG researched and produced the first edition of The Writers’ Handbook, a comprehensive resource manual for Manitoba writers.

In 2016, when government funding was withdrawn from MWG, the guild moved to a smaller space on the fifth floor.

The Guild has grown from the 20 members who joined after that first meeting to a peak membership of over 600. In 2025, membership was around 260.

In 2018, the guild had to abandon most of its office space after losing its funding the previous year from both the Manitoba Arts Council and the Winnipeg Arts Council.

== Publications ==
- 1991: The Writers’ Handbook (1st edition)
- 2006: A/Cross Sections: New Manitoba Writing — an anthology of Manitoba writing, including three guild-specific contributions:
  - "A Letter to My Friends Who are There" by Sandra Birdsell, a factual memoir of the Guild’s founding
  - "Bread & Water" by Daria Salamon, a recollection of Sheldon Oberman’s mentorship skills
  - "The Suitcase" by Smaro Kamboureli, a fictional revisiting of the Guild’s early days
- 2023: Beyond Boundaries
- It formerly had an official publication, a quarterly magazine called WordWrap.

== Events and other activities ==
The Guild has organized many events over the years (some of them jointly, with other organizations), including the Sheldon Oberman Mentoship Program, the 24-Hour Freedom to Read Marathon, The Dave Williamson National Short Story Competition, Poetry in Motion and Manitoba Book Week events, Brave New Words: The Manitoba Writing and Publishing Awards (with McNally Robinson booksellers). They also administer the province's public readings program and otherwise offer several educational sessions for writers. As well, they run the Patricia Blondal Memorial Writers' Retreat near Gimli, Manitoba, every summer. It also organizes the Manitoba Book Awards and the Sheldon Oberman Mentorship Program.

In 2023, the guild held its inaugural annual Dave Williamson National Short Story Competition, a writing competition open to submissions from across Canada. The guild also administers the annual Rabindranath Tagore Poetry Competition.

== See also ==
- List of writers from Manitoba
