= A Year of Lesser =

1996 book by David Bergen

- Book cover
- Author: David Bergen
- Language: English
- Genre: Novel
- Publisher: HarperCollins
- Publication date: 1996
- Publication place: Canada
- Media type: Print
- Pages: 240
- ISBN: 9781554688739

A Year of Lesser is the first novel of Canadian author David Bergen. It was published in 1996 by HarperCollins in Canada and the United States. The novel won the McNally Robinson Book of the Year Award in 1996.

== Plot ==
Johnny Fehr is a Mennonite Christian working as a salesman and living in a Canadian small town called Lesser, close to Winnipeg, Manitoba. At the start of the story his father commits suicide. The town of Lesser is a small community and hence every personal thing sooner or later becomes public. Johnny has his own problems like being an alcoholic and also being addicted to drugs. He falls in love with Lorraine and that brings excitement to his life. But he is already married to Charlene and also has kids with her. The scandal breaks open into the society and with turn of events Johnny loses his family of wife and children, his lover and also his few close friends. Coming from orthodox thoughts, people start treating him like a sinner but Johnny wishes to still live with grace and dignity.

== Publication and development ==
A Year of Lesser is the first novel by Bergen. He grew up in the small Canadian province of Manitoba town of Niverville, Manitoba. As the lead character of the novel also belongs to Manitoba, The Toronto Star noted that Bergen's Mennonite upbringing has influenced his writing for the novel. The novel was published in 1996 by HarperCollins in Canada and the United States.

== Reviews and reception ==
The novel won the McNally Robinson Book of the Year Award in 1996. Bergen again won the award in 2005 for The Time in Between and in 2009 for The Retreat. The graphic design of the book cover by designing firm Concrete Design Communications Inc., art director John Pylypczak and designer Daniel Andreani won the Merit Award by The Advertising & Design Club of Canada in 1996. The cover used a photography by William Eggleston.

Kirkus Reviews appreciates the novel as "moving, credible, and subtle" but criticizes for being "long and shapeless overall". American novelist Claire Messud in her New York Times review mentions that through novel "David Bergen explores what happens when the simplest of contemporary souls asks the biggest questions, and the novel, as rigorously unpretentious as its hero, attests to the ambiguities of the undertaking". Though The New York Times named the novel as "a notable book", it did not have a successful sell in the United States.
