= McNally Jackson =

Independent bookstore in New York City

McNally Jackson Books

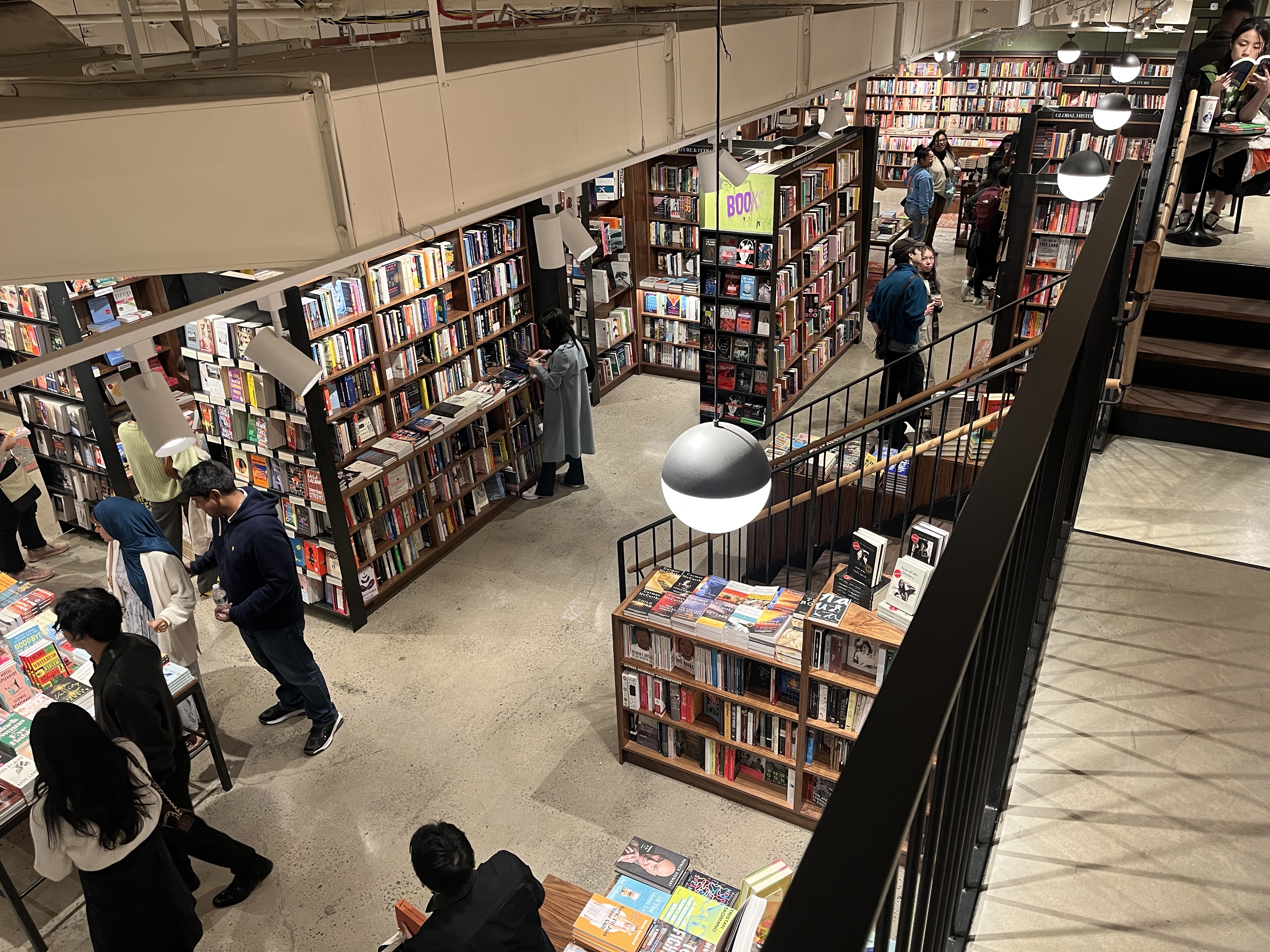
- McNally Jackson Bookstore, Prince Street
- Industry: Specialty retail
- Founded: 2004; 22 years ago
- Founder: Sarah McNally
- Headquarters: Manhattan, New York City, New York, United States
- Number of locations: 5 stores
- Area served: New York metropolitan area
- Products: New, used and rare books
- Owner: Sarah McNally
- Website: mcnallyjackson.com

McNally Jackson Books is an independent bookstore in New York City owned and operated since 2004 by Sarah McNally. The company operates five stores across the city in Soho, Rockefeller Center, Seaport, Downtown Brooklyn, and Williamsburg, as well as three stationery stores called Goods for the Study. McNally Jackson's publishing arm is McNally Editions, devoted to rediscovering unduly neglected books. In 2025, New York magazine called McNally Jackson "likely the third-largest buyer of books in the city, after only Barnes & Noble and the Strand."

== History ==
=== McNally Robinson ===
Sarah McNally was born in 1975 to Paul and Holly McNally, the founders of the Canadian McNally Robinson bookstore chain in 1981. She grew up in Winnipeg, where she got her first job at age 8 delivering newspapers before school and at 13 began working in the McNally Robinson back room receiving deliveries. She studied philosophy at McGill University and traveled through East Africa for a year and a half before moving to New York City in 1999. McNally worked as an editor at Basic Books before opening her own independent location of McNally Robinson in 2004.

=== Origin ===
In 2004, McNally opened her own McNally Robinson bookstore using money from her grandfather. She chose the location on Prince Street in Nolita after careful study. The store was renamed McNally Jackson in August 2008, a reference to Sarah McNally's newborn son with Christopher Jackson. A senior editor in the publishing industry, Christopher Jackson was married to McNally from 2004 to 2010 and never held a formal position at the store. In October 2011, the store had invested in an Espresso Book Machine to print both major publisher titles and approximately 700 self-published works per month. The Espresso machine remained in operation until 2017. McNally Jackson remains independent under the ownership of Sarah McNally, though McNally's parents sold McNally Robinson to longtime employees of the chain in 2012.

McNally continues to do the frontlist buying herself, and is known for prioritizing a backlist of older books, international authors, and books by small presses. In 2019, staff at all five McNally Jackson stores voted to unionize. A contract was ratified in 2021.

=== Additional locations ===
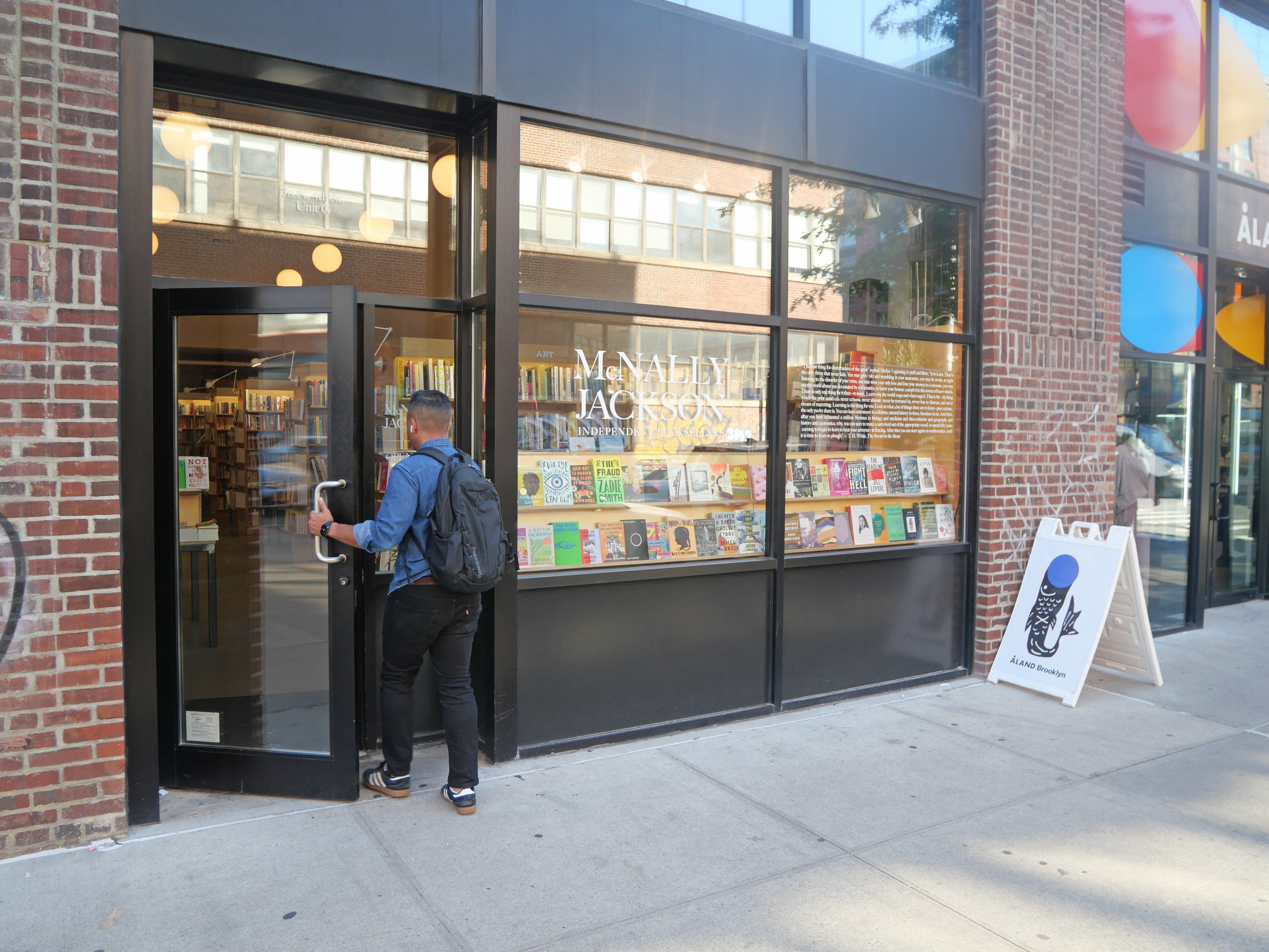
Williamsburg store

McNally opened a standalone stationery store in 2013 called Goods for the Study, located around the corner from the original McNally Jackson. Several additional locations have since opened.

In January 2018, McNally Jackson opened a second bookstore in Williamsburg, Brooklyn in the Lewis Steel Building at 76 N 4 St. In September 2019, McNally Jackson opened a third bookstore in the South Street Seaport, followed by a fourth bookstore in Downtown Brooklyn in March 2022, and a fifth in Rockefeller Center in the former Time & Life Building in 2023.

The original Prince Street location moved several blocks down the street in early April 2023 after public disagreements with the landlord over rent increases from $350,000 to $850,000 a year.

== Publishing ==
On August 26, 2021, McNally Jackson announced the launch of McNally Editions, a paperback reprint series "devoted to hidden gems", with the first titles including books by David Foster Wallace, Han Suyin, Penelope Mortimer, Kay Dick, Margaret Kennedy, and Roy Heath.
