= Here the Dark =

2020 book by David Bergen

- First edition
- Author: David Bergen
- Language: English
- Published: 2020
- Publisher: Biblioasis
- Publication place: Canada
- Pages: 224
- ISBN: 978-1771963213

Here the Dark is a 2020 book by David Bergen.

After a successful career as a novelist, Bergen returns to his original genre, short fiction. This book contains a novella and seven short stories that span his writing career.

The book was shortlisted for the Giller Prize in 2020. The book won the 2021 McNally Robinson Book of the Year Award.

== Contents ==
- "April in Snow Lake"
- "How Can Men Share a Bottle of Vodka?"
- "Hungry"
- "Never Too Late"
- "Saved"
- "Leo Fell"
- "Man Lost"
- "Here the Dark"
