= The Time in Between =

2005 novel by David Bergen

- Author: David Bergen
- Language: English
- Genre: Novel
- Publisher: McClelland & Stewart in Canada, Random House in the United States
- Publication date: August 16, 2005
- Publication place: Canada
- Pages: 288 (McClelland & Stewart), 256 (Random House)
- ISBN: 978-0-7710-1178-8 (McClelland & Stewart); ISBN 978-1-4000-6240-9 (Random House)
- OCLC: 58052004

The Time in Between is a novel by Canadian author David Bergen. It deals with a man, who mysteriously returns to Vietnam, where he had been a soldier earlier in his life, followed by his children, who also go to Vietnam to search for him. The novel was the recipient of the Scotiabank Giller Prize and the McNally Robinson Book of the Year Award in 2005.

== Plot ==
Charles Boatman, an army veteran suddenly disappears and his daughter Ada and her younger brother Jon on finding some clues go looking out for him in Danang, Vietnam. The novel mixes various stories from different timeframes narrating Charles's days in Washington when he was young. He married Sara and had daughter Ada while living in Fraser Valley of British Columbia. He gets posted in the wartime era to Vietnam and serves there and upon arrival discovers his wife's infidelity. Sara dies early and by then they also had a son Jon. Charles keeps getting nightmares of his Vietnam days on how he killed an innocent civilian boy in one of the operations and this keeps haunting him. On the other hand, Ada is on a mission to find her father and is helped by a local guy Yen who becomes her guide and guardian in the new country. She engages in a sexual relationship with an older man, Hoang Vu who is an artist by profession. Jon indulges in the nightlife of Vietnam, and Ada keeps getting closer to her father as she travels across the country. Charles discovers author Dang Tho's novel chronicling wartime and this helps him find some peace.

== Publication and development ==
The book is author David Bergen's fifth novel. Although generally called a war novel, the author states that he "[doesn't] see The Time in Between as a war novel". The book was released as Audio book by Blackstone Audio in December 2005 and was narrated by Anna Fields, better known as Kate Fleming.

== Reviews and reception ==
Kirkus reviews called the novel a "beautifully composed, unflinching and harrowing story". Nicholas Dinka in their Quill & Quire review mentions that the novel has "much decency and intelligence" and both the stories of the novel are "entirely plausible" but criticises for "remarkable dourness of its prose". While Dennis Lythgoe of Deseret News noted that "Bergen's book lives and breathes the Vietnam experience"; Ron Charles in his The Washington Post review mentioned that "Bergen's ability to dramatize trauma-induced disaffection is undeniable; whether readers will want to sink down that hole with his characters is less clear". Irene Wanner of The Seattle Times appreciated the novel for its writing.

The novel won the Scotiabank Giller Prize in 2005 while being nominated along with Luck (by Joan Barfoot), Sweetness in the Belly (by Camilla Gibb), Alligator (by Lisa Moore), and A Wall of Light (by Edeet Ravel). The judges Warren Cariou, Elizabeth Hay, and Richard B. Wright noted "The Time in Between explores our need to understand the relationship between love and duty....[] This is a subtle and elegantly written novel by an author in complete command of his talent". It also won the McNally Robinson Book of the Year Award in 2005. Bergen had earlier won the award in 1996 for A Year of Lesser and later again won in 2009 for The Retreat. Dan Zigmond of SFGate reviews the novel as "a rich and rewarding novel".
