= McNally Robinson Book for Young People Award =

Young adult and children's book award

The McNally Robinson Book for Young People Award is associated with the Manitoba Book Awards and was first sponsored by McNally Robinson Booksellers in 1997 and since then has been given in two categories: Young Adult and Children. It is presented to the two Manitoba writers whose books for young people are judged the best written. The two winning authors each receive a cash award.

== Winners ==
=== Pre 1997 winners ===
- 1995 — Margaret Buffie, The Dark Garden
- 1996 — Margaret Shaw-MacKinnon, Tiktala

=== Young Adult category ===
- 1997 — Diana Wieler, RanVan: Magic Nation
- 1998 — Diana Wieler, Drive
- 1999 — Martha Brooks, Being with Henry
- 2000 — Linda Holeman, Raspberry House Blues
- 2001 — Eva Wiseman, My Canary Yellow Star
- 2002 — Linda Holeman, Search of the Moon King’s Daughter
- 2003 — Duncan Thornton, The Star-Glass
- 2004 — Margaret Buffie, The Finder
- 2005 — Diane Juttner Perreault, Breath of the Dragon
- 2006 — Larry Verstraete, Lost Treasures: True Stories of Discovery

=== Children category ===
- 1997 — Sheldon Oberman, By the Hanukkah Light
- 1998 — No award given
- 1999 — Colleen Sydor, Smarty Pants
- 2000 — No award given
- 2001 — Sheldon Oberman, The Wisdom Bird
- 2002 — No award given
- 2003 — Connie Colker Steiner, Shoes for Amélie
- 2004 — No award given
- 2005 — Colleen Sydor, Camilla Chameleon
- 2006 — Colleen Sydor, Raising a Little Stink
- 2022 — Tasha Spillett-Sumner (illustrated by Michaela Goade), I Sang You Down from the Stars
