= Association for Manitoba Archives =

Voluntary archival Organisation in Canada

- Abbreviation: AMA
- Predecessor: Association of Manitoba Archivists (1980); Manitoba Council of Archives (1986)
- Formation: 1991
- Type: Non-profit
- Location(s): 606-100 Arthur Street Winnipeg, Manitoba Canada
- Coordinates: 49°53′53.0″N 97°8′27.2″W
- Website: mbarchives.ca

The Association for Manitoba Archives (AMA) is a voluntary organization dedicated to the preservation of the documentary heritage of the people and institutions of the province of Manitoba, Canada, by improving the administration, effectiveness and efficiency of the province's archival systems. The membership is made up primarily of archivists and archival institutions, but anyone who is interested in supporting the mandate of the organization can join.

Today, the AMA provides a number of services, including: support for its members; advisory services for both members and non-members; educational and training opportunities; advocacy to increase the awareness of archives in the wider community; publications; virtual and real exhibitions; grants and awards. Of particular interest to the broader community is the Manitoba Day Award, which recognizes those users of archives who have completed an original work of excellence which contributes to the understanding and celebration of Manitoba history.

== History ==
The AMA is an amalgamation of two organizations.

The Association of Manitoba Archivists, founded in 1980, provided a seasonal program of meetings on various archival subjects. It created a basic training program, implemented a field advisory service for new or emerging archives, published a newsletter and sponsored a number of outreach programs and events to promote the profession and archives.

The Manitoba Council of Archives, founded in 1986, was created specifically to distribute grants from the newly formed Canadian Council of Archives. In support of the grant program, the Manitoba Council undertook a provincial archival needs assessment study entitled "The Past is Present" (1988). A study of institutional standards and accreditation, the so-called Stunden Report, followed in 1990.

A joint committee was created to look at the existence of the two organizations and published a report in 1991. "Plan 2000: The Manitoba Archival Community in the 1990s" stated that the archival community in Manitoba was not large enough to support two separate organizations dedicated to archives and that a single organization should be established. The two organizations merged shortly thereafter.
