= Chandra Mayor =

Canadian poet and novelist

- Born: 1973 (age 52–53); Winnipeg, Manitoba, Canada
- Occupation: writer/editor

Chandra Mayor (born in 1973), is a Canadian poet and novelist whose writings explore urban and alternative cultures, among others. She lives in Winnipeg, Manitoba.

== Publishing career ==
Mayor's writing has appeared in several anthologies, including Interruptions: 30 Women Tell the Truth about Motherhood, Breathing Fire 2: Canada's New Poets, and Post-Prairie. Her first book, August Witch, a book of poetry, was short-listed for four Manitoba Book Awards and won the Eileen McTavish Sykes Award for Best First Book. She received the 2004 John Hirsch Award for Most Promising Writer, and the following year she followed that up with her novel, Cherry, which won the Carol Shields Winnipeg Book Award. Mayor, who is openly lesbian, was shortlisted for a 2008 CBC Literary Award for the title story from her most recent book, All the Pretty Girls (Conundrum Press), a collection of short stories. All the Pretty Girls won the 2009 Lambda Award for Best Lesbian Fiction.

== Awards ==
- Winner, Lambda Award for Best Lesbian Fiction, 2009
- Winner, Carol Shields Winnipeg Book Award, 2005
- Winner, John Hirsch Award for the Most Promising Manitoba Writer, 2004
- Winner, Eileen McTavish Sykes Award for Best First Book, 2003

== Quotes ==
Chandra Mayor on writing:

"Telling the truth is harder than telling lies. Which makes writing hard work. But it's also what makes it resonate, makes it mean something to the person who reads it. Writing is exhibitionism. Writing is dragging something out of you, kicking and screaming. Writing is also craft, which is only achieved through pure drudgery. At the end of it all, someone says, 'you spoke to me,' and it's all worth it."
