= Sarah Ens =

Canadian writer (born 1992)

- Born: 1992
- Occupation: Poet
- Writing career
- Period: 2020s–present
- Notable work: The World is Mostly Sky; Flyway
- Website: www.sarahens.com

Sarah Ens (born 1992) is a Canadian poet and editor from Winnipeg, Manitoba.

== Career ==
Ens began publishing poetry in the 2010s. Her first collection of poetry, The World is Mostly Sky, came out in 2020 with Turnstone Press. Her second work, Flyway, is a long poem published in 2022. Her collection The World is Mostly Sky was a finalist for the 2021 McNally Robinson Book of the Year Award and the Landsdowne Prize for Poetry in 2022. She has edited and copy edited works of fiction, non-fiction, and poetry, and also works as a publicist at University of Manitoba Press.

Her book Flyway won the 2023 ReLit Award for poetry. Flyway was also a finalist for the 2022 McNally Robinson Book of the Year Award and the Margaret McWilliams Award.

== Personal life ==
Raised in Landmark, Manitoba, Ens studied creative writing at the University of British Columbia and completed an MFA in writing at the University of Saskatchewan. She is married to graphic novelist Jonathan Dyck.
