= Prairie Fire (magazine) =

Canadian literary journal

- Categories: literary journal
- Frequency: Quarterly
- Founded: 1978
- Company: Prairie Fire Press
- Country: Canada
- Based in: Winnipeg
- Language: English
- Website: www.prairiefire.ca
- ISSN: 0821-1124

Prairie Fire is a Canadian literary journal published quarterly by Prairie Fire Press.

== About The Editor ==
Original editor Andris Taskans ran the magazine until his death in 2019.

Andris studied at the University of Winnipeg. Taskans was a founding member of the Manitoba Writers' Guild (established in 1981) and helped start the Manitoba Magazine Publishers Association (established in 1988). In 2004, Taskans accepted the Artists Award, sponsored by The Great-West Life Assurance Company. In 2008, Taskans received the Lifetime Achievement Award from the Western Magazine Awards Foundation on their 26th annual Western Magazine Awards in Richmond, BC. He was awarded the "Making a Difference Award" from the Winnipeg Arts Council in 2009 at the Mayor's Luncheon for the Arts in Winnipeg. Taskans died on September 27, 2019.

Taskans was also a writer, and published Jukebox Junkie in 1987 by Turnstone Press (a poetry chapbook).

In December of 2019, Carolyn Gray took over as Editor and has been the editor since then, according to the masthead.

== History ==
Prairie Fire magazine was founded in 1978 as Writers News Manitoba. WNM arose out of a group called the Winnipeg Writers Workshop (W3). The founding editors were Katherine Bitney, Elizabeth Carriere and Andris Taskans. WNM completed its transition to a literary journal in 1983, at which time the name was changed to Prairie Fire. The Manitoba Writers’ Guild published Prairie Fire from 1983 to 1989. The current publisher, Prairie Fire Press, Inc., was established in 1989.

The local writing and publishing scene was not as developed in 1978 as it is today. The members of W3 felt isolated both from the established writers of the Canadian Authors Association and from the University of Manitoba crowd gathered at St. John's College. Writers News Manitoba was created with two goals in mind: to serve as a vehicle for the dissemination of information to prairie writers and to promote the idea that we needed a province-wide writers' organization. After a few false starts, the Manitoba Writers' Guild was founded in 1981 and soon thereafter began publishing a newsletter. It was at this juncture that WNM was freed of its advocacy duties to become fully a literary magazine. Even then, however, it continued to hold as a priority the publishing of work by Manitoba writers. As one critic put it, Prairie Fire's job was to map the local literary landscape.

== Awards and honours ==
National Magazine Awards

2024: Gold in Personal Journalism for "The Passing Game" by Jennifer Robinson

2024: Silver in Personal Journalism for "Someone in a Reddish-Pink T-Shirt Walks Past the Window” by Avalon Moore

2024: Gold in Poetry for "bleach" by Cooper Skjeie

2024: Honourable Mention for "Lightning Kills" by Zilla Jones

2023: Silver in Fiction for "Museum of Winter" by Willy Blomme

2023: Honourable Mention in Poetry for "Misipawistik" by Duncan Mercredi

2022: Honourable Mention in Creative Non-fiction for "The Wait of Ashes" by Paul Dhillon

2021: Gold in Fiction for "Calling You" by Catherine Hunter

2019: Gold in Poetry for "The Green Carnation" by Ben Ladouceur

2018: Silver in Poetry for "Beauty; Sermon Series in a Mennonite Church" by Sarah Klassen

2017: Gold in Creative Non-fiction for 'The Burn" by Benjamin Hertwig

2013: Silver in Poetry for "Fashion" by Sue Goyette

Manitoba Magazine Awards

- 2016 – for fictiouite of poems – Three Poems by Patrick Friesen (36.3)
- 2015 – for fiction, “Red Egg and Ginger” by Anna Ling Kaye (35.3); for creative non-fiction, “Status Updates” by George Toles & Cliff Eyland (35.3)
- 2014 – for fiction, “The Book about the Bear” by John O’Neill (34.3); for creative non-fiction, “The Moon in Scorpio” by Trevor Corkum (34.2)
- 2013 – four awards, the most awards of any magazine: for fiction, “Frida Walks” by Alice Zorn (33.2); for poetry, “Plastic Bucket” by Louise Carson (33.1); for creative non-fiction, “Maxime’s” by Lorri Neilsen Glenn (33.2); for best single issue, art & literary, Volume 33, No. 3: “The Visionary Art of Sharon Butala”
- 2012 – for fiction, “Go with Bob” by Margaret Sweatman (32.4); for poetry, “Harry Mayzell’s Suit” by Harold Rhenisch (31.4)
- 2011 – for fiction, “Rabbit” by Théodora Armstrong (31.3)
- 2010 – for fiction, “Hold Me Now” by Stephen Gauer (30.2)
- 2009 – for most effective use of words: Two Poems by Barry Dempster (28.4); for best cover, image of Margaret Atwood (29.2)

Other awards

- Sue Goyette won silver at the 2013 National Magazine Awards for her poem “Fashion” in Prairie Fire (33.2)
- Mary Horodyski won Gold Award Best Article – Manitoba at the 2010 Western Magazine Awards for her essay “The Geography of Ambiguity,” published in (31.2)

== See also ==
- List of literary magazines

== External links and further reading ==
- Prairie Fire
- Our Members - Manitoba Magazine Publishers Association
