= Jóhann Magnús Bjarnason =

Canadian author and teacher (1866–1945)

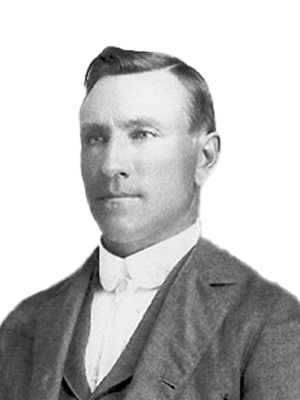
- Bjarnason in 1910
- Born: May 24, 1866 Norður-Múlasýsla, Iceland
- Died: September 8, 1945 (aged 79) Elfros, Saskatchewan
- Language: English
- Citizenship: Canada
- Genre: Poems; Short stories; Plays
- Years active: 1892–1935
- Spouse: Gudrun Bjornson (m. 1881)

Jóhann Magnús Bjarnason (May 24, 1866 – September 8, 1945) was an Icelandic-born Canadian novelist, teacher and poet. He moved to Canada at the age of 9 and wrote multiple short stories and poems.

== Biography ==
Jóhann Magnús Bjarnason was born on May 24, 1866 in Norður-Múlasýsla, Iceland. He moved to Canada in 1875, where he settled in Markland, Halifax County. In 1881, he married Gudrun Bjornson. After Markland collapsed, he moved to Winnipeg in 1882, before finally moving to New Iceland, Manitoba in 1889.

He began teaching in rural areas of Manitoba. In 1892, he published his first story Tales and Poems. He published his first novel Eiríkur Hansson in 1899. He retired in 1935, and moved to Elfros, Saskatchewan where he died on September 8, 1945 at the age of 79. A plaque was built in Geysir, Iceland in honour of him. A monument was also built near Arborg, Manitoba, called the Johann Magnus Bjarnason monument. It was recognized in March 1989.
