= Darlene Coward Wight =

Canadian curator (born 1948)

- Born: Darlene Coward; 1948 (age 77–78); Picton, Ontario, Canada
- Education: Peterborough Teachers' College (1967-1968); Carleton University, B.A. Art Hist. (with honors) (1978), M.A. (with distinction) (1980)
- Known for: world expert in Inuit art
- Spouse: Roger Wight

Darlene Coward Wight (born 1948) is a Canadian art historian who was Curator of Inuit art at the Winnipeg Art Gallery (WAG) from 1986 on.

== Career ==
Darlene Wight was born in Picton, Ontario and attended Peterborough Teachers' College (1967-1968); Carleton University, Ottawa, where she received her B.A. in Art History (with honors) in 1978, and her M.A. (with distinction), in 1980. She worked at Carleton U as a teaching assistant in art history (1978-1979), then as the fine arts curator for Canadian Arctic Producers, Ottawa (1981-1984) and as an independent curator and researcher, Ottawa (1983-1986). She was hired by the Winnipeg Art Gallery as associate curator of Inuit art (1986-1998), and became curator in 1998.

Wight helped make the Inuit Collection at WAG become more representative, geographically and chronologically. By 2013, after she received an Honorary Doctorate from the University of Manitoba (2012), the WAG was said to have the largest collection of contemporary Inuit art in the world, or half of its permanent collection. The gallery had collected Inuit art since 1957, initially, in part, due to Winnipeg’s business dealings with the Arctic, that is the city's historical status as a trading post of the Hudson’s Bay Company (HBC). Since 1972, there has been a full-time curator at the gallery for this collection. As the first curator of Inuit art, Jean Blodgett developed the gallery’s Inuit art collection, producing solo and group exhibitions with many catalogue publications.

Under Wight’s stewardship, major developments in Inuit art were defined and the collection doubled in size. She co-authored the story of contemporary Inuit art of Canada in the book catalogue which she edited for her major survey exhibition, Creation and Transformation: Defining Moments in Inuit Art (2014) which drew on 250 pieces from the gallery’s collection and was co-published by the gallery and Douglas & McIntyre. It received the Alexander Kennedy Isbister Award for Non-Fiction from the Manitoba Writers Guild (2013). She also authored the on-line book Oviloo Tunnille: Life and Work available at https://www.aci-iac.ca/art-books/oviloo-tunnillie.

Among the close to 100 exhibitions she coordinated and/or curated, Wight organized for the Winnipeg Art Gallery such major exhibitions as Out of Tradition, a 1989 exhibition of carvings by the brothers Abraham Anghik and David Ruben Piqtoukun. In 2024, she curated Ningiukulu Teevee: Stories from Kinngait for Canada House in London. She has been a regular contributor to Inuit Art Quarterly and has authored about 50 articles, papers and invited lectures. She has given lectures on Inuit art across Canada and the U.S.

== Awards ==
- Honorary Doctor of Letters from the University of Manitoba (2012),
- Alexander Kennedy Isbister Award for Non-Fiction from the Manitoba Writers Guild (2013)
- The YMCA-YWCA Women of Distinction Award (2017)
