= Catherine Hunter (poet) =

Canadian poet, novelist, editor, professor and critic

- Born: 1957 (age 68–69); Winnipeg, Manitoba
- Education: University of Winnipeg; University of Victoria
- Occupations: poet, novelist, editor, professor, critic

Catherine Hunter (born 1957 in Winnipeg, Manitoba) is a Canadian poet, novelist, editor, professor, and critic.

== Biography ==
Hunter received a BA (Hons.) from the University of Winnipeg and an MA and PhD from the University of Victoria. She is a faculty member at the University of Winnipeg where she teaches English and creative writing courses.

Her first published poems appeared in the Malahat Review in 1978. Hunter's writing has since appeared in Prairie Fire, Essays on Canadian Writing, Canadian Literature, and several other literary periodicals.

Hunter received the McNally Robinson Manitoba Book of the Year Award for Latent Heat (1997), a poetry collection.

She has also edited books of poetry for the Muses' Company Press.

Hunter's most recent work of fiction is the murder mystery novel Queen of Diamonds. Published by Turnstone Press imprint Ravenstone, Queen of Diamonds is a mystery thriller about fake psychics and their wealthy clientele, set in Winnipeg, Manitoba. It was launched and became available to the public in November 2006.

Her short story collection Seeing You Home was shortlisted for the Danuta Gleed Literary Award in 2026.

== Recognition ==
- 1998 McNally Robinson Book of the Year Award — Latent Heat
- 2020 Lansdowne Prize for Poetry — St. Boniface Elegies
- 2021 Gold, National Magazine Awards, Fiction — "Calling You", published in Prairie Fire
- Manitoba Magazine Award for Best Poem or Suite of Poems — four poems published in Contemporary Verse 2, later collected in St. Boniface Elegies

== Bibliography ==
=== Poetry ===
- Necessary Crimes - 1988 (ISBN 1-896239-60-9)
- Lunar Wake - 1994 (ISBN 0-88801-184-9)
- Latent Heat - 1997 (ISBN 0-921833-55-5)

=== Novels ===
- After Light - 2015 (ISBN 978-1927426-73-9)
- Where Shadows Burn - 1999 (ISBN 0-88801-231-4)
- The Dead of Midnight - 2001 (ISBN 0-88801-261-6))
- The First Early Days of My Death - 2002 (ISBN 0-921833-87-3)
- Queen of Diamonds - 2006 (ISBN 0-88801-322-1)

=== Anthologies ===
- Before the First Word: The Poetry of Lorna Crozier - 2005 (with Lorna Crozier) (ISBN 0-88920-489-6)
