= Rosalie Tennison =

Canadian author and journalist (1958–2025)

- Born: February 11, 1958
- Died: November 22, 2025 (aged 67); Winnipeg, Manitoba, Canada
- Website: rosalieitennison.ca

Rosalie Irene Tennison (February 11, 1958 – November 22, 2025) was a Canadian author and journalist.

== Career ==
Tennison worked as an agricultural journalist for a variety of media, including Grainews in the early 1980s. She won a gold medal at the 2022 Canadian Online Publishing Awards and received a gold citation from the Canadian Farm Writers' Federation. Following her return to Winnipeg, Tennison worked in the department of agriculture and food sciences at the University of Manitoba.

Her memoir, Naomi's Houses, was published by Heritage House Publishing in 2025.

== Personal life ==
Tennison grew up in the Swan River Valley region of Manitoba on a farm near the village of Bowsman. When she was six years old, her father died and her family moved to Swan River. She moved to Ontario for university and lived there for about 25 years before returning to Winnipeg after the death of her husband.

Tennison was struck by a vehicle while crossing an intersection in Osborne Village, Winnipeg, on November 21, 2025. She died from her injuries the following morning.

== Bibliography ==
- Naomi's Houses: A Memoir (Heritage House Publishing, 2025)
