= Alison Calder =

Canadian poet and educator

- Born: 21 December 1969 (age 56); London, England
- Education: University of Saskatchewan (BA); University of Western Ontario (MA, PhD)
- Spouse: Warren Cariou

Alison Calder (born 21 December 1969 in London) is a Canadian poet, literary critic and educator.

== Biography ==
Calder was born in London, England on 21 December 1969 and grew up in Saskatoon, Saskatchewan, Canada. She studied at the University of Saskatchewan, where she earned a Bachelor of Arts, and at the University of Western Ontario where she earned a Master of Arts and a PhD in English Literature. She was also a Distinguished Junior Scholar in Residence at the Peter Wall Institute for Advanced Studies, University of British Columbia.

In 2004, she won the RBC Bronwen Wallace Award for Emerging Writers.

Calder wrote a collection of essays in 2005 called History, Literature, and the Writing of the Canadian Prairies which examines literary criticism.

Her debut collection of poetry, Wolf Tree, was published in 2007. It won the 2008 Aqua Books Lansdowne Prize for Poetry and the Eileen McTavish Sykes Award for Best First Book by a Manitoba Author at the 2008 Manitoba Book Awards. It was a finalist for the Pat Lowther Memorial Award and the Gerald Lampert Memorial Award. Her second collection, In the Tiger Park, was published in 2014 and was a finalist for the Lansdowne Prize for Poetry.

She also co-wrote the chapbook Ghost Works: Improvisations in Letters and Poems, with Jeanette Lynes.

She lives in Winnipeg, Manitoba and works in the English Department at the University of Manitoba, where she teaches literature and creative writing. She is married to writer Warren Cariou.
