= Jim Matheson (journalist) =

Canadian sports journalist (born 1949)

- Born: April 7, 1949 (age 77); Winnipeg, Manitoba, Canada
- Education: University of Manitoba
- Occupation: Sports journalist
- Employer: Edmonton Journal
- Awards: Elmer Ferguson Memorial Award

James Donald Matheson (born April 7, 1949) is a Canadian sports journalist who has covered the NHL's Edmonton Oilers since their inception into the WHA in 1972. In 2000, he received the Hockey Hall of Fame's Elmer Ferguson Memorial Award.

== Career ==
=== Manitoba and Saskatchewan ===
Matheson was born on April 7, 1949, in Winnipeg, Manitoba to Jack and Peggy Matheson. Matheson had an intention to follow the footsteps of his father, Jack, a long-time sports editor for the Winnipeg Tribune. He graduated from the University of Manitoba with a degree in political science, and while in school, worked a part-time night shift with the Tribune.

=== Alberta ===
He got his first job upon completing school with the Regina Leader-Post, but moved west to Edmonton, Alberta six months later. Upon moving to Edmonton, Matheson got a job with the Edmonton Journal in 1970. He initially covered local curling and university sports, but quickly switched to hockey, when, in 1973, Edmonton was granted a WHA franchise, the Edmonton Oilers. Matheson became the beat writer for the Oilers then, and continued when the Oilers joined the NHL in 1979. He spent countless hours covering the team and its five Stanley Cups, and completed more than 300 stories per winter. In addition to writing, Matheson also was a part of the CFRN radio broadcasting team that covered the Oilers. After 24 years, he completed his tenure as beat writer for the Oilers in 1997. He now continues to write for the Edmonton Journal covering the NHL and the Oilers.

=== Later career ===
In January 2022, Matheson became a subject of international sports news after a heated exchange with Oilers player Leon Draisaitl after the team's sixth straight loss, calling Draisaitl "pissy" and accusing him of not providing the kind of answers he wanted for his column. A video of the exchange went viral on the Internet.

== Personal life ==
Matheson resides in Edmonton with his wife, Marni. They have one son, Scott. He received the Elmer Ferguson Memorial Award from the Hockey Hall of Fame in 2000.
