= Margaret Bemister =

Canadian writer and educator

Margaret Bemister (August 31, 1877 – March 3, 1984) was a Canadian writer and educator.

The daughter of George Bartlett Bemister, a native of Newfoundland, and Mary Elizabeth "Lizzie" McPhillips, a native of Ontario, she was born in Portage la Prairie, Manitoba. She attended the Winnipeg Normal School, where she received her teaching certificate. She collected and retold stories, including several told to her by a chief of the Syilx First Nation. Bemister contributed to the Manitoba Free Press and was an early member of the Winnipeg branch of the Canadian Women's Press Club. She helped create the Christmas Knapsack, an anthology published to raise money for Canadian soldiers during World War I. Besides non-fiction, she also wrote short stories and novels.

Bemister moved to Vancouver, British Columbia when she was 82; she later died at St. Vincent's Hospital there at the age of 107.

== Selected works ==
- Stories from Prairie and Mountain (1909)
- Manitoba Primer (1910)
- Thirty Indian Legends of Canada (1912)
- Indian Legends (1914)
- The Pixies' Reward (1917)
- The Golden Caravel (1962)
- The Arrow Sash (1965)
