= Jack Matheson =

Canadian sports journalist (1924–2011)

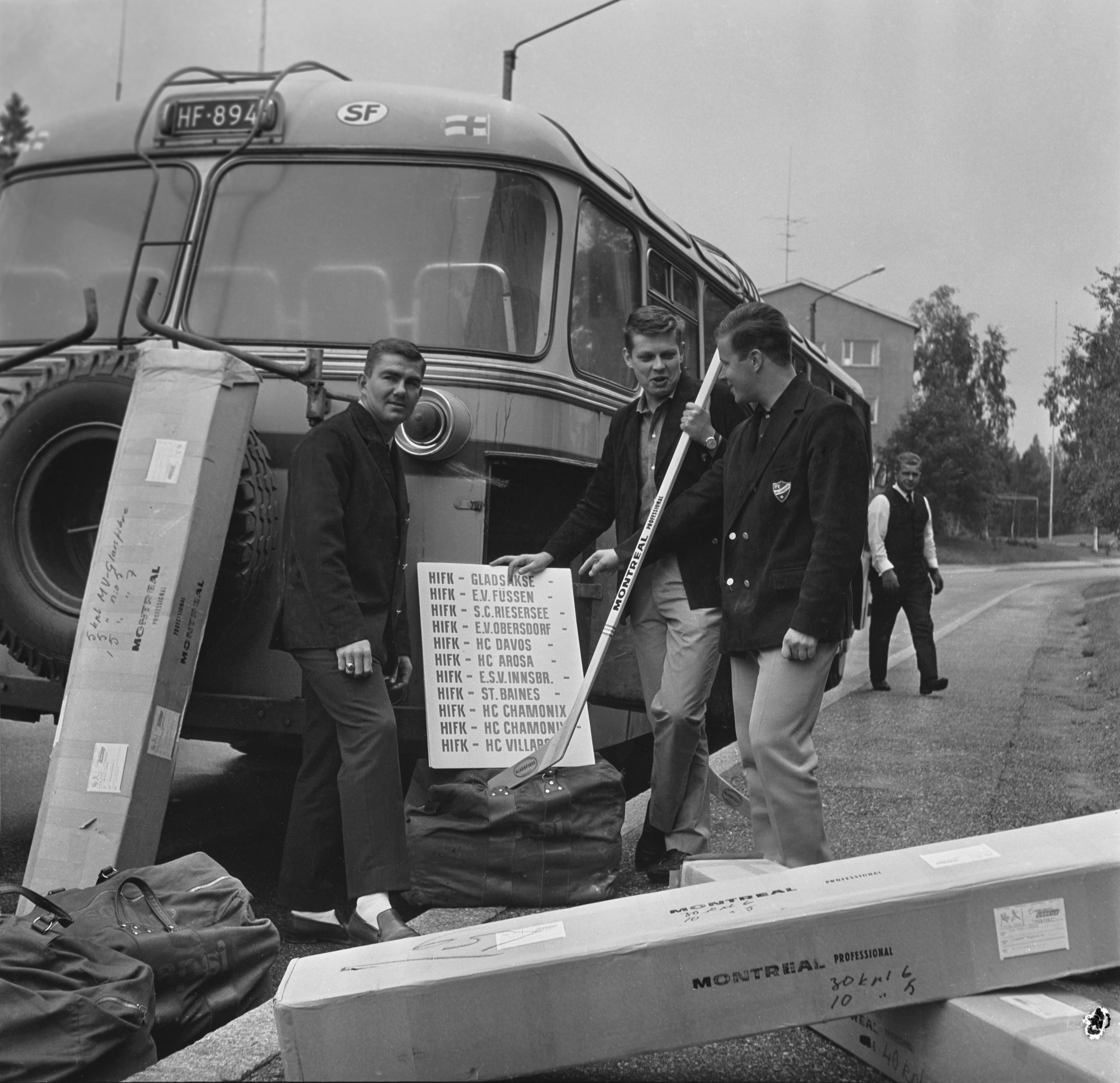
- Jack Matheson (left) with Finnish ice hockey club HIFK
- Born: May 25, 1924; Winnipeg, Manitoba, Canada
- Died: January 24, 2011 (aged 86); Winnipeg, Manitoba, Canada
- Occupation: sports journalist
- Spouse: Peggy Matheson (1947–2011, his death)
- Children: Jim, John, Marnie

John Matheson (July 25, 1924 – January 24, 2011) was a Canadian sports journalist known for his wide coverage of sports for the Winnipeg Tribune from 1946 to 1980.

Matheson was born on July 25, 1924, in Winnipeg, Manitoba. He began his newspaper career in 1946 with the Winnipeg Tribune. He became the sports editor for the newspaper in 1959, a position he held until the newspaper ceased publication in 1980. Matheson covered a variety of sports, including hockey, curling and football with the Tribune, and on the radio, working with CJOB.

Matheson was inducted into the Canadian Football Hall of Fame in 1986 and Manitoba Hockey Hall of Fame in 1999. The Jack Matheson Award is annually presented by the Manitoba Sportswriters and Sportscasters Association to aspiring students in sports communications.

Matheson was married to his wife Peggy for 63 years until his death. Matheson's son, James Donald "Jim" is also a distinguished sports writer, working for the Edmonton Journal since 1970. Jim was inducted into the Hockey Hall of Fame as a media honoree and received the Elmer Ferguson Memorial Award in 2000.

Jack Matheson died of kidney disease on January 24, 2011, at Grace Hospital in Winnipeg.
