= Carolyn Gray =

Canadian playwright

Carolyn Gray is a Canadian playwright.

== Biography ==
Her full-length play The Elmwood Visitation (Scirocco Drama) was produced by Theatre Projects Manitoba in 2007 and won the Manitoba Day Award for excellence in archival research. The Confessional of the Black Penitents or the True Path to the Church, a play about video lottery terminals, was part of Factory Theatre Toronto's Trans-Canada Reading Week in 2007 and is slated for production by Theatre Projects Manitoba. Catarinetta was produced as the Manitoba Theatre for Young People Junior Company show in 2008. Gray won the John Hirsch Award for Most Promising New Writer at the 2008 Manitoba Book Awards, and became the Aqua Books Writer-in-Residence in September 2009.

== Awards ==
- Winner, John Hirsch Award for Most Promising New Writer, 2008
- Winner, Manitoba Day Award, 2007

== Sources ==
- The Elmwood Visitation by Carolyn Gray, Scirocco Drama, 2007.
- North Main Gothic by Carolyn Gray, Scirocco Drama, 2010.
