= Jennifer S. H. Brown =

American–Canadian ethnohistorian

- Born: Jennifer Stacey Harcourt Brown; December 30, 1940 (age 85); Providence, Rhode Island, US

Academic background
- Education: Brown University (B.A.); Harvard University (A.M.); University of Chicago (PhD)
- Thesis: Company men and native families : fur trade, social and domestic relations in Canada's Old Northwest (1976)

Academic work
- Discipline: History
- Institutions: University of Winnipeg

Jennifer Stacey Harcourt Brown FRSC (born December 30, 1940) is an American–Canadian ethnohistorian. She is professor emerita of history at the University of Winnipeg and was a Tier 1 Canada Research Chair for Aboriginal Peoples in an Urban and Regional Context. In 2008, Brown was elected a Fellow of the Royal Society of Canada.

== Personal life and education ==
Brown was born on December 30, 1940, in Providence, Rhode Island. Her great-grandmother Elizabeth Young was the inspiration for her book "Mission Life in Cree-Ojibwe Country: Memories of a Mother and Son."

She earned her Bachelor of Arts from Brown University in 1962. From there, she was educated in Classical Archaeology at Harvard University and Cultural/Social Anthropology at the University of Chicago, where she earned her PhD.

== Career ==
After earning her PhD, Brown taught at Colby College, Northern Illinois University, Chiang Mai University, and Indiana University. In 1983, Brown was hired by the University of Winnipeg as an Associate Professor in History. In 1992, she was awarded the Erica and Arnold Rogers Award for Excellence in Research and Scholarship by the university. Later, in 1996, Brown was named the director of the Centre for Rupert's Land Studies due to her focused work in Aboriginal studies. Two years later, she simultaneously worked as an adjunct professor at the University of Manitoba for graduate thesis and dissertation service and consultation. She stayed in this position until 2011.

In 2002, Brown earned a British Academy Visiting Professorship at the University of Oxford.

In 2004, Brown was named the University of Winnipeg Canada Research Chair in Aboriginal Peoples in an Urban and Regional Context. In 2008, Brown became the second University of Winnipeg professor, and first woman, to be elected a Fellow of the Royal Society of Canada. In the following years, Brown and fellow University of Winnipeg professor Susan Gray published a collection of essays on Ojibwe Studies. Brown officially retired from the university in 2011.

In 2017, Brown was the recipient of the Canadian Historical Association Prairies Lifetime Achievement Award and the American Society of Ethnohistory Lifetime Achievement Award. That same year, Brown published a collection of essays in relation to Rupert's Land and colonization in the 17th century. The book was shortlisted for the Manitoba Day Award.

== Publications ==
The following is a selected list of publications by Brown:

- Ojibwe Stories from the Upper Berens River : A. Irving Hallowell and Adam Bigmouth in Conversation (2018)
- An Ethnohistorian in Rupert's Land:Unfinished Conversations (2017)
- Together We Survive: Ethnographic Intuitions, Friendships, and Conversations (2016). Co-edited with John S. Long.
- Mission Life in Cree-Ojibwe Country: Memories of a Mother and Son (2014)
- Col. William Marsh: Vermont Patriot & Loyalist (2013). With Wilson B. Brown.
- Memories, Myths, and Dreams of an Ojibwe Leader (2009)
- Reading beyond Words: Contexts for Native History (2003). Co-edited with Elizabeth Vibert.

The Orders of the Dreamed: George Nelson on Cree and Northern Ojibwa Religion and Myth, 1823 (1988). With Robert Brightman.

The New Peoples: Being and Becoming Metis in North America. (1986). Co-edited with Jacqueline Peterson.

- Strangers in Blood: Fur Trade Company Families in Indian Country (1980)
