= Family Allowance Act =

The Family Allowance Act (French: Loi sur les allocations familiales) is an Act of the Parliament of Canada, legislated in 1944 and initiated in 1945, as the first universal welfare program implemented in Canada, passed under the leadership of Prime Minister William Lyon Mackenzie King. As a governmental Income Security Expenditure, payments were transferred directly to the individual who qualified for them, in this case the mother of the children concerned. As is characteristic of some Security Expenditures, the benefits were approved for qualified families regardless of overall income, or any other factors related to need.

== Background ==
Initially, the payments were untaxed, and varied depending on age and number of children under care, with an average payment of five dollars to each family per child per month. Several minor amendments were made in the following years, varying provincially. In 1974, a substantial amendment was made to the Act, with payments raised to twenty dollars per month, with some provincial differences with respect to age and number of children in the family. The payments also became Taxable income taxable. Several amendments were made to the Act from that point on, such as increasing the age of coverage to seventeen years of age for the province of Quebec in 1961, and for the rest of the country in 1964. In 1992, the Family Allowance Act was folded in with other social welfare programs into the Child Tax Benefit.

The idea for implementing a family allowance came in the context of the major depression of the 1930s in which many families within Canada were struggling. The state received pressure to provide assistance and in 1940 amended legislation to permit statewide unemployment insurance, the beginning of social supports offered throughout the country. These circumstances prompted politicians to propose federal legislation to offer more welfare services. The Act was informed by the Marsh Report in 1943, which outlined a reconstruction plan for the country after World War II and was written to address the poverty in Canada. It suggested several welfare programs, including a family allowance program. Prime Minister William Lyon Mackenzie King's government selected just family allowance to implement.

The proposed benefits of the program were predicted to help the declining post-war economy, and in general, was aimed to aid families in Canada during that time. It was also suggested that this would help attain horizontal equity, which acknowledged those providing for children had a larger financial burden and so require more assistance than those without children to support. Further, that it would help maintain the overall citizens purchasing power, helping to avoid destabilization of the economy.

To qualify for the benefits offered by the government at the time the act was initiated in 1945, the family would only be considered eligible for assistance under the conditions that there were children under the age of 16 in care, the family maintained a permanent residence, and the children were enrolled in the school system.

== Criticism ==
Common critiques of the Act at the time included concerns that taxpayer money was being wasted due to the payments being sent to everyone who qualified indiscriminately, without determining if they needed financial help at all. The reasoning given by the government was that calculating each potential recipient's annual income would be costlier than the benefits given to the minority of high-income earners. There were also political criticisms, claiming the motivation for the family allowance act was largely an attempt to get the vote of French Canadians, who had larger families on average. Others advocated for service-based assistance, while those in favour of the direct payment method suggested this would unnecessarily restrict individual financial freedom and choice.

== Indigenous applicability ==
Given the basic requirements, the act did not apply evenly to everyone living in Canada and depended upon their relationship with the Canadian state. Although there was no mention of the exclusion of Indigenous families directly in the Family Allowance Act, the Indian Act modified how this legislation applied to Indigenous peoples. The Indian Act was amended in 1920 to make Residential School attendance mandatory for children up to the age of 15, and in 1930 up to the age of 16. In order to receive the benefits under the Family Allowance Act, the children in Indigenous communities were required to attend Schools. Exceptions were also made for Immigrant families, in which first year immigrants were not eligible until an amendment made in 1961.
