= Jodi Carmichael =

Canadian author

- Occupation: Writer
- Writing career
- Genres: Children's, Young adult fiction
- Notable works: Spaghetti is Not a Finger Food(and other life lessons), Forever Julia
- Notable awards: 2013 Silver Moonbeam Award
- Website: www.writingandotherlifelessons.blogspot.ca

Jodi Carmichael is a Canadian author.

Her debut children's book, Spaghetti is Not a Finger Food (and Other Life Lessons), was published in 2013 by the California-based publisher, Little Pickle Press. In 2013, it won a Silver Moonbeam award, for Best First Book. In the same year it also won the Silver Benjamin Franklin Digital Award for innovation in an electronic book. The book followed a day in the life of a quirky young boy named Connor. Connor has Asperger's Syndrome and the book was intended to increase understanding and acceptance of those on the Autism spectrum. According to Carmichael: "The theme is acceptance – of yourself and others." In addition to being an author, Carmichael is also a strong advocate for Asperger's Syndrome.

Her second book, Forever Julia, was published in 2015 by Winnipeg-based publisher, Great Plains Publications. Forever Julia is a contemporary teen novel about a 16-year-old girl who falls hard, for the wrong boy. Julia slowly realizes that love and infatuation can turn dark. Fast. Ultimately, only Julia can decide what lines cannot be crossed. Forever Julia was featured in the Spring 2015 issue of Quill and Quire Magazine as an exposé on contemporary teen literature dealing with tough issues such as relationship abuse and sexual abuse.
