= Anita Daher =

Canadian writer

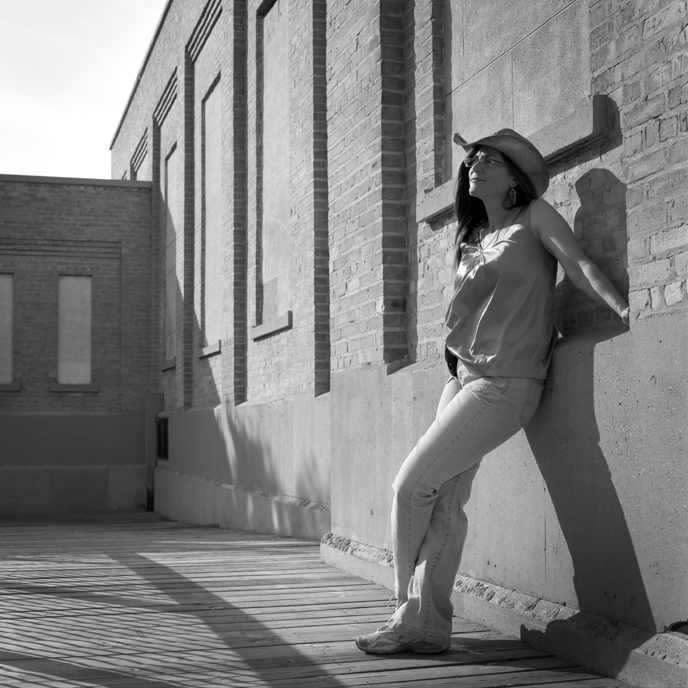
- Anita Daher in 2009
- Born: Summerside, Prince Edward Island, Canada
- Occupations: Writer; Actor; Producer
- Writing career
- Language: English
- Period: 2002–present
- Genres: Children's literature; Young adult literature
- Notable awards: John Hirsch Award for Most Promising Manitoba Writer (2007)
- Website: anitadaher.com

Anita Daher is a Canadian actor, producer, and writer, who has written more than 17 published books.

Daher sat as Chair of the Writers' Union of Canada from 2019–2021, the first two-year term Chair in the Union's history.

== Works ==
=== Books ===
- 2002: Flight from Big Tangle.
- 2004: Flight from Bear Canyon.
- 2007: Racing for Diamonds.
- 2007: Spider's Song.
- 2007: Two Foot Punch.
- 2008: Poachers in the Pingos.
- 2009: On the Trail of the Bushman.
- 2013: Itty Bitty Bits.
- 2013: Wager the Wonder Horse.
- 2014: Billeh the Kid.
- 2015: Wonder Horse.
- 2018: Forgetting How to Breathe.
- 2020: You Don't Have to Die in the End.
- 2022: Peanut Butter and Chaos, the first book in The Mythic Adventures of Samuel Templeton series.
- 2023: Peanut Butter and Pandemonium, the second book in The Mythic Adventures of Samuel Templeton series.

=== Audiobooks ===
- 2012: The Wilderness Cure.
- 2014: The Hustle.

== Awards ==
=== Wins ===
- Winner, John Hirsch Award for Most Promising Manitoba Writer, 2007
- Dinner Party, which Daher produced, won an award at the Absurd Short Film Festival, 2024
- Dinner Party, which Daher produced, won an award at the Monza Film Festival, 2024
- Dinner Party, which Daher produced, won an award at the One-Reeler Short Film Competition, 2024
- Winner, You Don't Have to Die in the End (screenplay), Best Feature Script, New York Screenplay Competition, 2024

=== Finalist selections and shortlistings ===
- Finalist, Flight from Big Tangle, Diamond Willow Award, 2004
- Finalist, Racing for Diamonds, Arthur Ellis Award for best juvenile crime novel, 2008
- Finalist, Spider's Song, Arthur Ellis Award for best juvenile crime novel, 2008
- Shortlisted, Racing for Diamonds, Hackmatack Children's Choice Book Award (English Fiction), 2009
- Shortlisted, Spider's Song, McNally Robinson Book for Young People Award (Older Category), 2009
- Shortlisted, Forgetting How to Breathe, IODE Violet Downey Book Award, 2019
- Shortlisted, You Don't Have to Die in the End, McNally Robinson Books for Young People Award (Older Category), 2021
- Finalist, You Don't Have to Die in the End (screenplay), Barnstorm Fest Screenplay Competition (Features Category), 2025

=== Nominations ===
- Nominated, You Don't Have to Die in the End, White Pine Award, 2021
- Nominated, Peanut Butter and Chaos, Manitoba Young Readers' Choice Awards (Sundogs Category), 2024
- Nominated, Peanut Butter and Chaos, Red Cedar Award, 2023–2024

=== Longlistings ===
- Longlisted, "Mime", CBC Short Story Prize, 2017
