= J. R. Léveillé =

Canadian writer

Joseph Roger Louis Léveillé, OC commonly known as J. R. Léveillé or J. Roger Léveillé, is a Canadian writer from Winnipeg, Manitoba. A key figure in Franco-Manitoban literature, he is most noted for his 2001 novel The Setting Lake Sun (Le soleil du lac qui se couche), which won the Prix Rue-Deschambault for Franco-Manitoban literature in 2002, and was selected for the 2020 edition of Le Combat des livres.

Unusually in Canadian literature, both the original French Le soleil du lac qui se couche and its English translation The Setting Lake Sun were published concurrently in 2001; normally, Canadian literature in translation is not published until several months or even years after the original version. Sue Stewart, the novel's translator, received an honorable mention from the John Glassco Translation Prize for The Setting Lake Sun.

Léveillé was educated at the University of Manitoba and in France, writing his master's thesis on the work of Alain Robbe-Grillet. He has published numerous works of poetry, fiction and non-fiction since 1968, and his most recent novel, Ganiishomong, ou l’extase du temps, was published in 2020.

He was awarded the Manitoba Arts Council's Award of Distinction in 2012.

== Works ==
- Tombeau, 1968
- La disparate, 1975
- Œuvre de la première mort, 1977
- Le livre des marges, 1981
- Plage, 1984
- Extrait, 1984
- L’incomparable, 1984
- Montréal poésie, 1987
- Causer l’amour, 1993
- Les fêtes de l’infini, 1996
- Une si simple passion, 1997
- Pièces à conviction, 1999
- Dess(e)ins, 1999
- Le soleil du lac qui se couche, 2001
- Dess(e)ins II/Drawing(s) II, 2001
- Fastes, 2003
- Nosara, 2003
- New York Trip, 2003
- rRr, 2005
- Parade ou Les autres par J.R. Léveillé, 2005
- Logiques improvisées, essais, Éditions du Blé, 2005.
- Généalogie de Lieu, 2005
- Transformation, 2006
- Litanie, 2008
- L'Étang du Soir, 2008
- Pierre Lardon - Poésies choisies, 2011.
- Poème Pierre Prière - 2011
- L'Invocation de Rutebeuf et de Villon, 2012
- Sûtra, 2013
- Sondes, 2014
- Ganiishomong, ou l’extase du temps, 2020
