= Laurie Block =

Canadian poet and educator

Laurie Block (1949–2018) was a Canadian poet and educator. Born in Winnipeg, Manitoba, he studied at the University of Winnipeg and the University of Manitoba.

== Bibliography ==
- Governing Bodies - poetry, 1988 ISBN 0-88801-140-7
- Foreign Graces/Bendiciones Ajenas - poetry, 1999 ISBN 1-896239-48-X
- Time Out of Mind - poetry, 2006 ISBN 0-88982-225-5

== Awards ==
- Honourable Mention, League of Canadian Poets Annual Contest, 1990
- First place in the Manitoba Writers' Guild Writing Contest, 1993
- Third place, dANDelion Poetry Contest, 1994
- First place in the Manitoba Writers' Guild Writing Contest, 1994
- Honourable Mention, League of Canadian Poets Annual Contest, 1997 and 1990
- Honourable Mention, Arc Magazine poem of the year contest, 1998
- Second and third prize, Bliss Carman Poetry Award, 1999
- First prize, Prairie Fire Fiction Contest 2003
- Gold Medal Award for short fiction, National Magazine Awards, Canada, 2004
- Winner, Aqua Books Lansdowne Prize for Poetry, 2007
