= Jonathan Dyck =

Canadian graphic novelist

- Occupation: graphic novelist
- Writing career
- Period: 2020s–present
- Notable work: Shelterbelts

Jonathan Dyck is a Canadian graphic novelist from Winnipeg, Manitoba.

== Career ==
Dyck began publishing comics in the 2010s, including publication in The Walrus and others.

His debut graphic novel, Shelterbelts, set in the fictional Mennonite town of Hespeler, was published by Conundrum Press in 2022. Shelterbelts won the 2023 McNally Robinson Book of the Year Award at the Manitoba Book Awards. It was also co-winner of the Eileen McTavish Sykes Award for best first book and also won the Doug Wright Award for Emerging Talent.

In 2024, Dyck illustrated a short nonfiction graphic novel called The Secret Treaty, told by Dave Scott, about a handshake treaty between the Ojibwe and early Mennonite settlers of the West Reserve.

== Personal life ==
Dyck grew up in a Mennonite family in Winkler, Manitoba and currently lives in Winnipeg. He is married to poet Sarah Ens.
