= McNally Robinson Book of the Year Award =

The McNally Robinson Book of the Year Award is associated with the Manitoba Book Awards and was established in 1988. It is presented to the Manitoba writer whose adult English language book is judged the best written. The author receives a cash award of $5,000, donated by McNally Robinson Booksellers.

== Winners ==
McNally Robinson Book of the Year Award winners
Year	Author	Title
1988	Jan Horner	Recent Mistakes
1989	Kristjana Gunnars	The Prowler
1990	Di Brandt	Agnes in the sky
1991	Margaret Sweatman	Fox
1992	Sandra Birdsell	The Chrome Suite
1993	Carol Shields	The Stone Diaries
1994	Patrick Friesen	Blasphemer's Wheel
1995	Victoria Jason	Kabloona in the Yellow Kayak
1996	David Bergen	A Year of Lesser
1997	Catherine Hunter	Latent Heat
1998	Miriam Toews	A Boy of Good Breeding
1999	Gordon Sinclair Jr.	Cowboys and Indians
2000	Miriam Toews	Swing Low: A Life
2001	Margaret Sweatman	When Alice Lay Down With Peter
2002	Jake MacDonald	Houseboat Chronicles: Notes from a Life in Shield Country
2003	Armin Wiebe	Tatsea
2004	Miriam Toews	A Complicated Kindness
2005	David Bergen	The Time in Between
2006	Faith Johnston	A Great Restlessness: The Life and Politics of Dorise Nielsen
2008	Wayne Tefs	Be Wolf: A True Account of the Survival of Reinhold Kaletsch
2009	David Bergen	The Retreat
2010	Allan Levine	Coming of Age: A History of the Jewish People of Manitoba
2011	Dora Dueck	This Hidden Thing
2012	Esme Claire Keither	Not Being on a Boat
2013	Meira Cook	The House on Sugarbush Road
2014	Barbara Huck	Kisiskatchewan
2015	Joan Thomas	The Opening Sky
2016	Wab Kinew	The Reason You Walk
2017	Katherena Vermette	The Break
2018	Michael Kaan	The Water Beetles
2019	Gordon Goldsborough	More Abandoned Manitoba: Rivers, Rails, and Ruins
2020	Kateri Akiwenzie-Damm et al.	This Place: 150 Year Retold
2021	David Bergen	Here the Dark
2022	David Bergen	Out of Mind
2023	Jonathan Dyck	Shelterbelts
