= Dora Dueck =

Canadian writer

Dora Dueck (born 1950) is a Canadian writer. She is the author of three novels, two collections of short fiction, and a book of essays and memoir. Her most recent book is Like a River Divides the Earth: five stories (2026). Her second novel, This Hidden Thing, was shortlisted for the Margaret Laurence Award for Fiction and won the McNally Robinson Book of the Year Award at the 2011 Manitoba Book Awards. What You Get at Home, a collection of short stories, was shortlisted for the Margaret Laurence Award for Fiction and the Carol Shields Winnipeg Award at the 2013 Manitoba Book Awards. It won the High Plains Book Award for Short Stories. The Malahat Review, a Canadian literary magazine, awarded its 2014 Novella Prize to her story "Mask". All That Belongs, her third novel, was published in 2019. Return Stroke: essays & memoir was published in 2022. Her stories and articles have appeared in a variety of journals and on the CBC.

She holds both a Bachelors and a Masters of Arts degree in history from the University of Winnipeg and the University of Manitoba (joint program).

== Bibliography ==
- Under the Still Standing Sun Winnipeg, MB: Kindred Press (1989)
- This Hidden Thing Winnipeg, MB: CMU Press (2010)
- What You Get at Home Winnipeg, MB: Turnstone Press (2012)
- All That Belongs Winnipeg, MB: Turnstone Press (2019)
- Return Stroke: Essays and Memoir Winnipeg, MB: CMU Press (2022)
- Like a River Divides the Earth Vancouver, BC: Freehand Books (2026)

== Awards ==
- 2020 Shortlisted, Carol Shields Winnipeg Books Award - All That Belongs
- 2014 Winner, The Malahat Review - Novella Prize - Mask
- 2013 Winner, High Plains Book Award - Short Stories - What You Get at Home
- 2013 Shortlisted, Margaret Laurence Award for Fiction - What You Get at Home
- 2013 Shortlisted, Carol Shields Winnipeg Book Award - What You Get at Home
- 2011 Shortlisted, Margaret Laurence Award for Fiction - This Hidden Thing
- 2011 Winner, McNally Robinson Book of the Year Award - This Hidden Thing
- 2000 The Duff Roblin Fellowship, University of Manitoba
- 1999 Donald V. Snider Memorial Fellowship, University of Winnipeg
