= McNally Robinson =

Independent bookstore

- Company type: Family business
- Industry: Books
- Founded: 1981; 45 years ago
- Founder: Holly & Paul McNally
- Headquarters: Winnipeg, Manitoba, Canada
- Website: mcnallyrobinson.com

McNally Robinson Booksellers is a family-operated chain of Canadian independent bookstores founded in Winnipeg, Manitoba in 1981. It is managed by new owners Chris Hall and Lori Baker, formerly managed by Holly and Paul McNally. As of 2019 it had three branches, two in Winnipeg and one in Saskatoon, as well as a sister-store McNally Jackson in New York City.

== Overview ==
McNally Robinson was founded by Holly McNally in 1981 in Winnipeg, Manitoba, with her partner Ron Robinson, who quit the book business a year later to pursue a career with CBC Radio. Robinson's name has remained attached to the enterprise because at the time he left, McNally didn't have the money to replace the store's signage. Beginning with just one small corner bookstore, Holly and her husband Paul gradually built McNally Robinson Booksellers into one of the largest independent bookstores in Canada, spreading to Saskatoon and (formerly) Calgary. The stores host readings and book launches by authors from Winnipeg, Canada and beyond.

McNally Robinson operates three stores: at Grant Park Mall in Winnipeg, at The Forks in Winnipeg and on 8th Street in Saskatoon, Saskatchewan. A former Calgary location closed at the end of July, 2008. Two other locations, one at the Polo Park in Winnipeg and another at the Shops at Don Mills in Toronto, Ontario, closed in December 2009. Two of the three McNally Robinson stores are larger than 2000 square metres. Grant Park and Saskatoon locations are home to a full-service licensed restaurant, Prairie Ink.

On December 3, 2004, a 7,000-square-foot (650 m^{2}) store was opened in downtown Manhattan, New York City. The store operates under the name McNally Jackson and is owned and operated by Sarah McNally, daughter of the founders. It is one of the largest independent bookstores in Manhattan.

On October 3, 2012, McNally Robinson was sold by its founders, Holly and Paul McNally, to business partners Chris Hall and Lori Baker.

== Awards ==
McNally Robinson sponsors two literary awards:

- McNally Robinson Book of the Year Award
- McNally Robinson Book for Young People Award
