= Susie Moloney =

Canadian author of horror fiction (born 1962)

Susie Moloney on Bookbits radio.

Susie Moloney (born February 27, 1962, in Winnipeg, Manitoba) is a Canadian author of horror fiction. The film rights to her book, A Dry Spell, were purchased by Cruise/Wagner Productions in 1997, for a reported seven figures. Moloney was the first novelist to appear on the cover of Chatelaine magazine. She was also featured on the cover of Scarlett Magazine. Moloney was the winner of the Michael Van Rooy Award for Genre Fiction. Moloney splits her time between Canada and New York City. Her husband is award-winning playwright Vern Thiessen.

== Works ==
- Bastion Falls (1995)
- A Dry Spell (1997)
- The Dwelling (2003) (published in the UK as 362 Belisle St., the address of the house in The Dwelling)
- "The Thirteen" (2011)
- "Things Withered" (2013)
- “The Lodger” (2026)
