= David Bergen =

Canadian writer

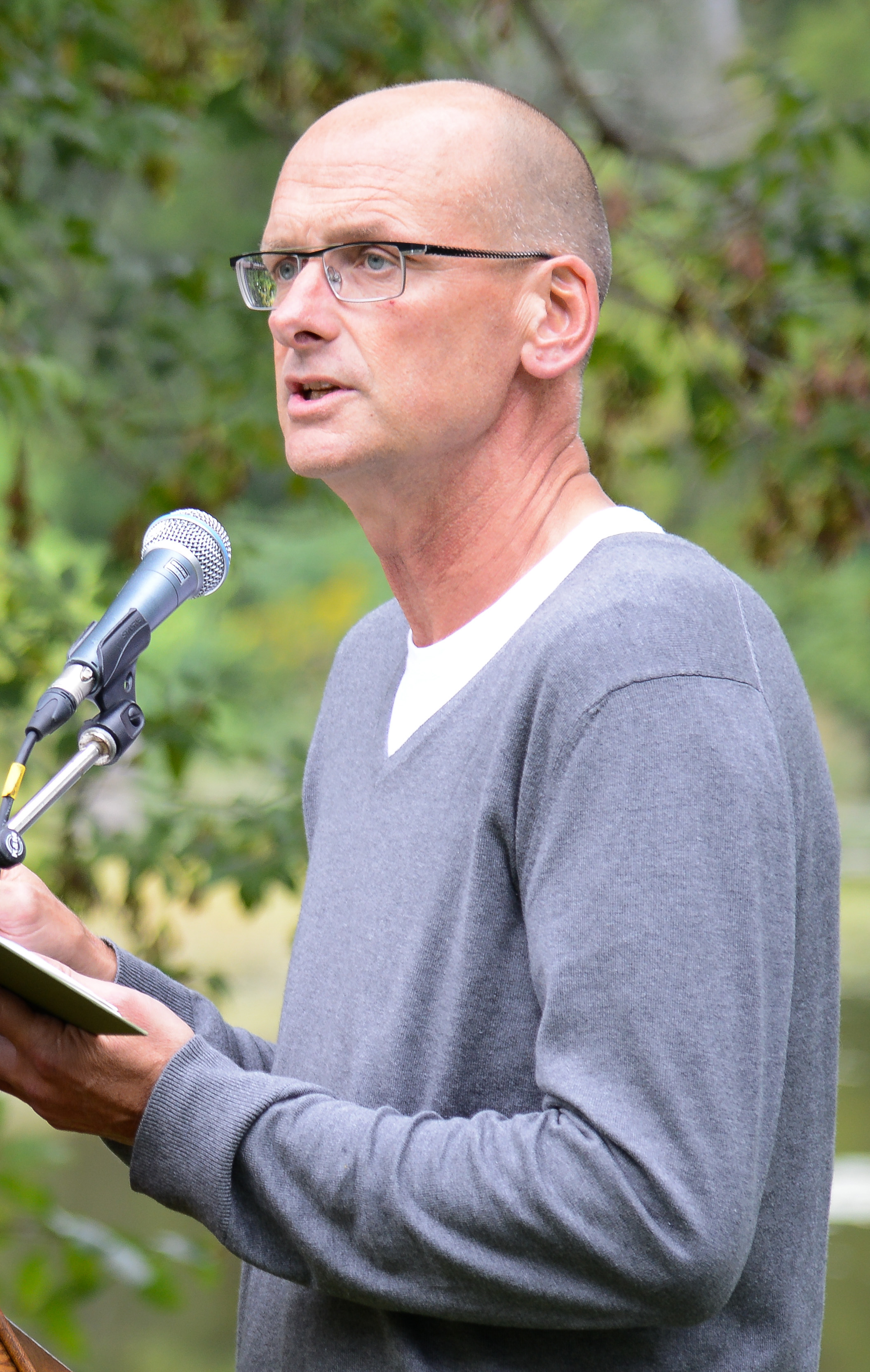
- Bergen at the Eden Mills Writers' Festival in 2013
- Born: January 14, 1957 (age 69); Port Edward, British Columbia, Canada
- Occupations: Novelist, short story writer
- Writing career
- Genre: Literary fiction
- Notable works: The Matter with Morris; A Year of Lesser; The Case of Lena S.; The Time in Between

David Bergen (born January 14, 1957) is a Canadian novelist. He has published eleven novels and two collections of short stories since 1993 and is currently based in Winnipeg, Manitoba, Canada. His 2005 novel The Time in Between won the Scotiabank Giller Prize and he was a finalist again in 2010 (for The Matter With Morris) and 2020 (for Here the Dark), making the long list in 2008 (for The Retreat).

== Life and career ==
Bergen was born on January 14, 1957, in Port Edward, a small fishing village in British Columbia, Canada, and later grew up in the small town of Niverville, Manitoba. He went to Bible college in British Columbia and Red River College in Winnipeg, Manitoba, where he studied creative communication. He taught English and Creative Writing at Winnipeg's Kelvin High School until 2002.

Raised Mennonite, Bergen has noted that the tendency of the church to stifle questions and criticism affected his decision to write fiction. "Writing is a way of figuring things out," he says. "If you can't ask certain questions in church, maybe you can ask them in fiction."

His debut novel, A Year of Lesser in 1996, was a New York Times Notable Book and winner of the McNally Robinson Book of the Year Award. His 2002 novel The Case of Lena S. was a finalist for the Governor General's Award for English-language fiction, and won the Carol Shields Winnipeg Book Award. It was also a finalist for the McNally Robinson Book of the Year Award, and the Margaret Laurence Award for Fiction.

His 2005 novel The Time in Between won the Scotiabank Giller Prize, received a coveted starred review in the Kirkus Reviews trade magazine, and was recently longlisted for the 2007 International Dublin Literary Award. In 2008, he published his fifth novel, The Retreat, which was longlisted for the Scotiabank Giller Prize, and which won the McNally Robinson Book of the Year Award, and the Margaret Laurence Award for Fiction. In 2010, he was shortlisted again for the Scotiabank Giller Prize for his sixth novel, The Matter with Morris, which was also shortlisted for the 2012 International Dublin Literary Award.

He is also the author of a collection of short fiction, Sitting Opposite My Brother (1993), which was a finalist for the Manitoba Book of the Year. His most recent short story collection, Here the Dark, was published in 2020, and was shortlisted for the Giller Prize and the 2021 ReLit Award for short fiction.

His 2023 novel Away from the Dead was longlisted for the Giller Prize.

== Bibliography ==
=== Novels ===
- 1996: A Year of Lesser, HarperCollins Canada
- 1999: See the Child, HarperCollins Canada
- 2002: The Case of Lena S., McClelland & Stewart
- 2005: The Time in Between, McClelland & Stewart
- 2008: The Retreat, McClelland & Stewart
- 2010: The Matter with Morris, HarperCollins Canada
- 2012: The Age of Hope, HarperCollins Canada
- 2014: Leaving Tomorrow, HarperCollins Canada
- 2016: Stranger, HarperCollins Canada
- 2021: Out of Mind, Goose Lane Editions
- 2023: Away from the Dead, Goose Lane Editions
- 2025: Days of Feasting and Rejoicing, Goose Lane Editions

=== Short-story collections ===
- 1993: Sitting Opposite My Brother, Turnstone Press
- 2020: Here the Dark: Stories and a Novella, Biblioasis

== Awards ==
=== Awards won ===
- 1996 John Hirsch Award — A Year of Lesser
- 1996 McNally Robinson Book of the Year Award — A Year of Lesser
- 1999 CBC Literary Award, Short Story — How Can 'N' Men Share a Bottle of Vodka
- 2002 Carol Shields Winnipeg Book Award — The Case of Lena S.
- 2005 Giller Prize — The Time in Between
- 2005 McNally Robinson Book of the Year Award — The Time in Between
- 2008 McNally Robinson Book of the Year Award — The Retreat
- 2008 Margaret Laurence Award for Fiction — The Retreat
- 2018 Matt Cohen Award
- 2021 McNally Robinson Book of the Year Award — Here the Dark
- 2022 McNally Robinson Book of the Year Award — Out of Mind

=== Shortlisted and finalist ===
- 1993 Finalist, Manitoba Book of the Year — Sitting Opposite My Brother
- 2002 Shortlisted, Governor General's Award — The Case of Lena S.
- 2002 Finalist, McNally Robinson Book of the Year Award — The Case of Lena S.
- 2002 Finalist, Margaret Laurence Award for Fiction — The Case of Lena S.
- 2010 Shortlisted, Giller Prize — The Matter with Morris
- 2012 Shortlisted, International Dublin Literary Award — The Matter with Morris
- 2020 Shortlisted, Giller Prize — Here the Dark
- 2021 Shortlisted, ReLit Award for short fiction — Here the Dark

=== Longlisted ===
- 2007 Longlisted, International Dublin Literary Award — The Time in Between
- 2008 Longlisted, Giller Prize — The Retreat
- 2016 Longlisted, Giller Prize — Stranger
- 2023 Longlisted, Giller Prize — Away from the Dead

=== Other recognition ===
- 1996 A Year of Lesser selected as a New York Times Notable Book
- 2013 The Age of Hope selected for Canada Reads, defended by Ron MacLean
