= Sheldon Oberman =

Canadian children's writer (1949–2004)

Sheldon Oberman (May 20, 1949 – March 26, 2004) was a Canadian children's writer who lived in Winnipeg, Manitoba.

Born in Winnipeg, Manitoba, Oberman (known to friends as Obie) grew up in the city's North End. After graduating from St. Johns High School, he studied literature first at the University of Winnipeg and then at the Hebrew University in Jerusalem. Oberman lived and travelled through Canada, Europe and the Middle East before he returned to Winnipeg in 1973, where he received his teaching degree. In 1975, he started working as an English, Drama and Journalism teacher at Joseph Wolinsky Collegiate, a job he held for nearly 30 years.

Oberman started writing in the mid-seventies, inspired by bedtime stories he told his children. An important development in his career as a writer was the summer he spent at the Banff School of Fine Arts where he studied under W. O. Mitchell. Oberman published twelve books, including the award-winning Always Prayer Shawl (1999), The Shaman's Nephew (1999; short-listed for the Governor General's Award), The Island of the Minotaur, and "Solomon and the Ant and other Jewish Folktales" (2006), (published posthumously).

Oberman acted and directed in both film and stage plays, and toured North America as a professional storyteller. He wrote columns and freelance articles for the Winnipeg Free Press and published children's songs, stories and poems in a number of magazines, journals and anthologies.

He died of stomach cancer on March 26, 2004.

== Selected bibliography ==
- A Mirror of a People: Canadian Jewish Experience in Poetry and Prose (1985)
- TV Sal and the Game Show from Outer Space (1993)
- The Business with Elijah (1993)
- The White Stone in the Castle Wall (1994)
- The Always Prayer Shawl (1999)
- By the Hanukkah Light (1997)
- The Shaman's Nephew (1999)
- The Wisdom Bird: A Tale of Solomon and Sheba (2000)
- Island of the Minotaur: Greek Myths of Ancient Crete (2003)
- Solomon and the Ant and other Jewish Folktales (2006)

== Awards ==
- 1994: National Jewish Book Award in the Children Picture Book category for The Always Prayer Shawl
