= University of North Dakota Writers Conference =

Annual literary conference

The University of North Dakota Writers Conference is an annual literary event held at the University of North Dakota (UND) located in Grand Forks, North Dakota, whose mission is to offer open access to the arts and create opportunities for discussion of how they impact our everyday lives. The Writers Conference is known for being one of the most distinguished cultural events on campus and the state. It brings prominent writers from the United States and abroad to Grand Forks. To date, the Conference has hosted over 360 authors (most genres) and artists to its literary event, including thirty-five Pulitzer Prize winners, four recipients of the Nobel Prize, and many others who have received awards from the MacArthur Foundation, National Book Foundation, National Book Critics Circle, Academy of Motion Picture Arts and Sciences, and more. The participants are by invite only, but all events are, and have always been, free and open to the public.

In recent years, thanks in part to grants from the National Endowment for the Arts, over 150 hours of archival video footage is now freely available for educational, scholarly, and historical purposes at commons.und.edu/writers-conference.

Number	Year	Theme	Participants										
53rd	2022	Communities and the Individual	Hanif Abdurraqib	Jessica Bruder	Kelli Jo Ford	Kaitlyn Greenidge	Cal Lane	Sarah Vogel					
52nd	2021	Roots to the Earth	Aylan Couchie	Ross Gay	Joy Harjo	Marie Mutsuki Mockett	Nnedi Okorafor	Sonia Shah					
51st	2020	The Working Classes	Reginald Dwayne Betts	Roy G. Gúzman	Laila Lalami	Richard Tsong-Taatarii	Matt Young	Jenny Zhang					
50th	2019	What the Future Holds	Heid E. Erdrich	Kiese Laymon	Sally Wen Mao	Patrick Martinez	Tommy Orange	Sarah Smarsh					
49th	2018	Truth & Lies	Molly McCully Brown	Nicholas Galanin	David Grann	Marlon James	Lauren Markham	Lorenzo Serna of Unicorn Riot					
48th	2017	Citizen	Viet Thanh Nguyen	NoViolet Bulawayo	Jennine Capó Crucet	Layli Long Soldier	Jeff Shotts	Mai Der Vang	Mario Ybarra, Jr.				
47th	2016	The Art of Science	Brian Greene	Kim Stanley Robinson	Katherine Coles	Tania James	Allison Leigh Holt	Frank Huyler					
46th	2015	The Other Half	Roxane Gay	Gish Jen	Bonnie Jo Campbell	Carol Muske-Dukes	Alexandra Grant	Torill Stokkan					
45th	2014	Imagine: A Literary Festival on the Prairie	Colson Whitehead	Robert Pinsky	Geoff Dyer	Sarah Leavitt	Jessica Lott	Brian Maxwell					
44th	2013	A Portrait of an Artist	Dorothy Allison	Mary Jo Bang	Richard Bausch	Nick Flynn	Tony Kushner	Ed Bok Lee	Gary Shteyngart	Cheryl Strayed			
43rd	2012	humanimal	Mark Doty	Hal Herzog	Pam Houston	Brenda Miller	Aaron Poochigian	Lee Ann Roripaugh	Jane Smiley				
42nd	2011	(Inter)National Affairs	Sean McLain Brown	Jim Castellanos	Susan Deer Cloud	Jamaica Kincaid	Maxine Hong Kingston	Amoussa Koriko	Carl Phillips	Matthew Sienkiewicz	Russell Scott Valentino		
41st	2010	Mind the Gap: Print, New Media Art	Mark Amerika	Cecelia Condit	Deena Larsen	Nick Montfort	Stuart Moulthrop	Art Spiegelman	Frank X Walker	Saul Williams	Zeitgeist		
40th	2009	Wit	Steve Almond	Charles Baxter (Presidential Lecture)	Marco Candida	Chuck Klosterman	Jacqueline Osherow	Karen Russell	Greg Williamson				
39th	2008	Revolutions	Russell Banks (Presidential Lecture)	Junot Díaz	Alexandra Fuller	Alice Fulton	Peter Kuper	Salman Rushdie					
38th	2007	Writing the Body	Stuart Dybek	Mary Gaitskill	Anne Harris (painter)	Li-Young Lee	Timothy Liu	Leslie Adrienne Miller	Michelle Richmond	Miller Williams (Presidential Lecture)			
37th	2006	Border Crossings	Carol Gilligan	Barry Lopez (Presidential Lecture)	Robin Magowan	Sam Pickering	Mark Salzman	Fan Shen	Nance van Winckel	Branca Vilela			
36th	2005	Hope/Illusion	Chris Belden	Carolyn Forché	Charles Johnson	Marilyn Nelson	Kathleen Norris	Jane Urquhart	Jane Varley				
35th	2004	35th Anniversary Writers Conference	Elmaz Abinader	Tony Buba	Annie Dawid	Louise Erdrich (Presidential Lecturer)	Albert Goldbarth	Tony Khalife	Marilynne Robinson	Mark Turcotte	Larry Woiwode		
34th	2003	Art & Science	Natalie Angier	Rafael Campo	Devra Davis	Alison Hawthorne Deming	Thomas Disch	Ted Mooney	Pattiann Rogers	Oliver Sacks	Julia Whitty		
33rd	2002	Explorations	Kate Daniels	Sharon Doubiago	Eddy Harris	Ursula Hegi	Bill Holm	David Treuer	Sara Wheeler				
32nd	2001	Worklife/Lifework	Peter Carey	Gary Fisketjon	Kent Haruf	Natasha Trethewey	Joy Williams	Frederick Wiseman	Ofelia Zepeda				
31st	2000	Writing War	John Balaban	Eavan Boland	Tessa Bridal	Robert Olen Butler	Helen Fremont	Arnold Isaacs	Ha Jin	Louis Simpson	Barbara Sonneborn		
30th	1999	Expressing the Sacred	Joseph Bruchac	Robert Clark	Mark Doty	Galway Kinnell	Victor Masayesva Jr.	Peter Matthiessen	Ruhama Veltfort	Terry Tempest Williams			
29th	1998	The Use of History	Toi Derricotte	Patricia Hampl	John Hanson	Paulette Jiles	Arnošt Lustig	Josef Škvorecký	August Wilson	Susan Yuzna			
28th	1997	Writing Nature: The Nature of Writing	Susan Griffin	Linda Hogan	Garrett Hongo	Bill McKibben	Bill Morrissey	Annick Smith	David Treuer	Meeka Walsh			
27th	1996	Living in America	Rosellen Brown	Jon Hassler	Sydney Lea	Li-Young Lee	David Mura	Susan Power	Pattiann Rogers				
26th	1995	States of the Art	Sherman Alexie	Gordon Henry Jr.	Yusef Komunyakaa	Bharati Mukherjee	Tim O’Brien	Sharon Olds	Marge Piercy				
25th	1994	Homelands	Jonis Agee	Sandra Benitez	Adrian Louis	John Stone	Jervey Tervalon	Larry Watson	James Whitehead				
24th	1993	La Literatura: Contemporary Latino/Latina Writing	Gloria Anzaldúa	Ana Castillo	Martín Espada	Francisco Goldman	Luisa Valenzuela	Ed Vega					
23rd	1992	A Festival of Publishers and Writers	Carol Bly	Diane Glancy	Linda Hasselstrom	William Kloefkorn	Ted Kooser	Lon Otto	David Pichaske	Maura Stanton	Thom Tammaro	Mark Vinz	
22nd	1991	The Literatures of Canada	David Arnason	Ven Begamudré	Di Brandt	Roch Carrier	Madeleine Gagnon	Kristjana Gunnars	W.P. Kinsella	Dorothy Livesay	Michael Ondaatje	Carol Shields	David Williamson
21st	1990	The Literature of Immigration	Karen Karbo	James McAuley	Reginald McKnight	Lore Segal	Ron Vossler	Will Weaver	Solveig Zempel				
20th	1989	Circle of Many Colors	Gretel Ehrlich	Richard Ford	William Least Heat-Moon	N. Scott Momaday	Leslie Silko	David Solheim	Tobias Wolff				
19th	1988	Parent and Child	Michael Dorris	Louise Erdrich	Patrick Hemingway	Adam Hochschild	Mona Simpson	W. D. Snodgrass					
18th	1987	Writers of the Purple Sage	Ralph Beer	Joy Harjo	Robert Kammen	Larry McMurtry	Paul St. Pierre	Elizabeth Tallent	James Welch				
17th	1986	To Make a Prairie	Raymond Carver	Ellen Gilchrist	Rebecca Hill	Maxine Kumin	Jay McInerney	Ernest Mickler	Robert Ward	John Yount			
16th	1985	Narratives	Ann Beattie	Sandra Birdsell	Amy Clampitt	Jorie Graham	Alex Haley	Barry Hannah	Norman Mailer	Thomas McGrath (poet)			
15th	1984	Nineteen eighty-four	Harlan Ellison	Gay Haldeman	Joe Haldeman	Robert Silverberg	Jane Sturgeon	Theodore Sturgeon	Luisa Valenzuela	Roger Zelazny			
14th	1983	The Centennial Year	Joseph Brodsky	Carolyn Forché	Richard Howard	Bobbie Ann Mason	James Alan McPherson	James Merrill	Czesław Miłosz				
13th	1982	International Writers	Ellen Gilchrist	Thomas McGrath (poet)	Alain Robbe-Grillet	Susan Sontag	Arturo Vivante	Derek Walcott					
12th	1981	Voices	Esther Broner	Robert Creeley	Etheridge Knight	Denise Levertov	Ntozake Shange	Richard Wilbur					
11th	1980	The Storyteller	Harry Crews	Selo Black Crow	James Crumley	James Dickey	June Jordan	Richard Kostelanetz	Leslie Silko				
10th	1979	Epitomes, Bombast, and Climaxes	Edward Albee	Robert Bly	Frederick Exley	N. Scott Momaday	Grace Paley	Megan Terry					
9th	1978	The Mirror and the Lamp	John Ashbery	Amiri Baraka	William Burroughs	Ring Lardner Jr.	Tillie Olsen	Eudora Welty					
8th	1977	Literature and Film	Harlan Ellison	George Garrett	John Houseman	Larry McMurtry	Marcel Ophüls	Joan Tewkesbury					
7th	1976	New Journalism and the Novel	Truman Capote	Ed McClanahan	B.J. Phillips	Alix Kates Shulman	Larry Woiwode	Tom Wolfe					
6th	1975	Spirit of Place	John Barth	Wendell Berry	William Gass	Ken Kesey	N. Scott Momaday	Ishmael Reed	Alice Walker				
5th	1974	City Lights Bookstore in North Dakota	Gregory Corso	Lawrence Ferlinghetti	Allen Ginsberg	Michael McClure	Peter Orlovsky	Kenneth Rexroth	Gary Snyder	Miriam Patchen			
4th	1973	Women in the Arts	Gwendolyn Brooks	Carolyn Kizer	Myrna Lamb	Mary McCarthy	Diane Wakoski	Sylvia Wilkinson					
3rd	1972	American Indian Writers Conference	Frederick Manfred	Ed McGaa	Thomas McGrath (poet)	Simon Ortiz	Jerome Rothenberg	James Welch	Ray Young Bear				
2nd	1971	Northern Plains Writers Conference	David Evans	Roland Flint	Lois P. Hudson	Richard Lyons	Thomas McGrath (poet)	John R. Milton	Antony Oldknow				
1st	1970	Southern Writers Conference on the Arts	William Anderson	John C. Carr	Fred Chappell	Jesse Hill Ford	George Garrett	Peter Taylor	James Whitehead				
