= Black Crow =

Black Crow may refer to:

- Black crow, a species of birds of the genus Corvus
  - Black crow, alternate name of the Cape crow (Corvus capensis)
- Black Crow (automobile), an automobile manufactured from 1909 to 1911 by the Crow Motor Car Company
- Black Crow (character), a fictional Native American superhero published by Marvel Comics
- Black Crows Skis, a French ski brand
- Selo Black Crow (1932–2004), Native American leader, rodeo rider, paratrooper
- "Black Crow", a Joni Mitchell song from the 1976 album Hejira
- "Black Crow", a Shonen Knife song from the 2014 album Overdrive
- "Black Crow", a 2010 single by Angus & Julia Stone
- Pave Mace/Black Crow, a magnetic anomaly detector used by the Lockheed AC-130A during the Vietnam War

== See also ==
- The Black Crowes, an American band
