= Questions I Asked My Mother =

1987 poetry collection by Di Brandt

- Author: Di Brandt
- Language: English
- Published: 1987 (Turnstone Press)
- Publication place: Canada
- Media type: Print (paperback)
- Pages: 96 pp (first edition)

Questions I Asked My Mother (stylized in all lowercase) is the first volume of poetry by the Canadian poet Di Brandt published in 1987 by Turnstone Press. The poems explore Brandt's Mennonite childhood in Reinland, Manitoba and are considered an important and influential early work of secular Mennonite poetry.
