= Reva Stone =

Canadian artist (born 1944)

- Born: 1944 (age 81–82)
- Occupation: Artist
- Known for: Electronic and robotic artist

Reva Stone RCA (born 1944) is a Canadian artist known for her digital artworks. As one of the first women to be involved in the new media arts in Canada, her large-scale projects influenced many artists she mentored.

== Early career ==
Stone graduated from the University of Manitoba in 1985. She originally began as a painter in art school, "but that didn't last long" (according to Stone). She began working on interactive pieces in 1989, creating Legacy. Legacy, finished in 1993, is a child's room, one wall representing a stereotypical girl and the other representing a stereotypical boy, exploring gender roles of young children. The viewer can interact with the installation through a computer game that cries out, "Come play with me".

== Work ==
Since the early 1990s, Stone has focused almost exclusively on interactive, technologically based art forms, using technology to isolate and explore specific properties of the human experience. She has done work with "the misogynistic world of video games, the disciplinary effects of medical science, the stimulation of human intelligence and affect in robotics, and the visual modeling of protein molecules."

Her "most ambitious piece" (according to Robert Enright) is Imaginal Expression, which appeared in a featured exhibition at the Winnipeg Art Gallery in 2004. In this piece, she shaped parts of her body (hair, skin, fingers) into protein molecules projected as moving images on a 9' x 48' screen. Stone sees Imaginal Expression as a visual form of potential for "genetic re-mapping and re-engineering."

Carnevale 3.0, finished in 2002, mirrors human consciousness by taking pictures of viewers in the gallery that are either stored or "forgotten" as a way to simulate human memory. The robot figure is inspired by a picture of Stone herself as a young girl. This choice was very intentional, according to Stone, and attempts to work against the "image of women in cyberculture."

sentientBody, 1998, uses Stone's own disembodied breathing matched with images of water and sand "to both realize and dematerialize the existence of the body" (according to Enright). Stone has been featured in numerous solo exhibitions as well many group exhibitions. She is also featured in six public collections in Canada and private collections throughout Canada and the United States.

== Awards and recognitions ==
Stone was inducted into the Royal Canadian Academy of Arts in 2007. Carnevale 3.0 was recognized by Life 5.0, Art & Artificial Life International Competition, Fundación Telefónica in Madrid, Spain with an honorable mention. In 2015, she received a Governor General's Awards in Visual and Media Arts.

== Exhibitions ==
sentientBody - Multimedia installation (1998)

Carnevale 3.0 - Multimedia installation (2002)

Imaginal Expression - Multimedia Installation (2004)
