= Wayne Tefs =

Canadian novelist, writer, editor, critic, and anthologist (1947 – 2014)

Wayne Tefs (1947 – September 15, 2014) was a Canadian novelist, writer, editor, critic, and anthologist.

== Career ==
From 1975 to 1977, Tefs and David Arnason produced the radio program Canadian Writers Symposium, for which they interviewed 45 Canadian writers, including well-known figures such as Milton Acorn, George Bowering, Patrick Lane, Daphne Marlatt, W.O. Mitchell, P.K. Page, Al Purdy, and Adele Wiseman. He published numerous newspaper and magazine articles, and dozens of critical reviews.

In 1976, Tefs co-founded Turnstone Press, with David Arnason and others, and later served as the press's fiction editor from 1995 until close to his death in 2014. He also founded the literary magazine The Sphynx.

In 1983, his first novel, Figures on a Wharf, was short-listed for the Books in Canada First Novel Award. It was followed by The Cartier Street Contract in 1985 and seven more novels in later years, as well as the posthumously published Barker. In 2000, his novel Moon Lake received the inaugural Margaret Laurence Award for fiction, and in 2007, Be Wolf received the McNally Robinson Book of the Year Award. His short story Red Rock and After received the Canadian Magazine Fiction Gold Medal and was reprinted in The Journey Anthology (1990).

He also edited three anthologies of short fiction, published the collection of short fiction Meteor Storm in 2010, and wrote the memoirs Rollercoaster:A Cancer Journey (2002), about living with cancer, and On the Fly (2012), about sport fandom and his lifelong involvement with hockey. Another memoir about living with cancer, Dead Man on a Bike: Riding with Cancer, was published posthumously in 2016.

== Awards and recognition ==
In 1999, Red Rock was featured in its entirety on CBC radio's Between the Covers. In 2010 Red Rock was cited in T. F. Rigelhof's Hooked on Canadian Books as "one of my first five choices" to be placed on a Canada Reads list. In 2010 Red Wing Films released a documentary on Tefs. The posthumously published novel Barker was long-listed for a 2015 Relit Award.

== Personal life ==
Tefs was a Woodrow Wilson Fellow and taught at a number of Canadian universities and colleges. From 1978 to 1992, he was Head of English at St. John's-Ravenscourt School in Winnipeg. He also taught at the University of Regina, McGill University, and the University of Winnipeg.

Tefs lived in Winnipeg, Manitoba, with his wife, Kristen Wittman, a commercial lawyer and poet. Tefs was born the middle of three children in St. Boniface, Manitoba (then an independent community east of the old Winnipeg) to Armin and Stella Tefs, and lived in Northwestern Ontario before moving to Steinbach, Manitoba in the 1960s where he graduated high school at the Steinbach Collegiate Institute and met future poet Patrick Friesen. He often wrote about the Canadian Shield country of Ontario and the North.

In 1994, he was diagnosed with a rare and terminal cancer, which he contended with the aid of biological modification drugs and radio-isotope therapies. He died on September 15, 2014.

== Education ==
In 1971, he graduated from the University of Manitoba and received the gold medal for Arts Honours. He was awarded a Woodrow Wilson Fellowship and took his M.A. at the University of Toronto. He was a lecturer at the University of Saskatchewan (Regina Campus) from 1972–1974 before completing a PhD at the University of Manitoba in 1978. He received a certificate of education from McGill University in 1981.

== Bibliography ==
- Figures on a Wharf - 1983
- The Cartier Street Contract - 1985
- The Canasta Players - 1990
- Dickie - 1993
- Red Rock - 1997
- Home Free - 1998
- Moon Lake - 2000
- Rollercoaster, a cancer journey - 2002
- 4X4 - 2004
- Be Wolf – 2007
- Meteor Storm - 2009
- Bandit - 2011
- On the Fly - 2012
- Barker - 2015

== Articles ==
- Our Tour de France, The Globe and Mail, 5 July 2008
- Les Rois Tragiques du Ring, in L'Impossible, September 1992
- Tragic Lords of the Ring, The Globe and Mail, 22 May 1992
- The Last Hurrah, West, August, 2000
- Of Ice and Men, The Globe and Mail, 7 October 2001
- The Goalie Mask, West, March 1991
