= John Carr =

John Carr may refer to:

== Politicians ==
- John Carr (Indiana politician) (1793–1845), American politician from Indiana
- John Carr (Australian politician, born 1819) (1819–1913), member of the South Australian House of Assembly, 1865–1884
- John H. Carr (1849–?), member of the Arkansas House of Representatives
- John Carr (Australian politician, born 1871) (1871–1929), unionist and member of the South Australian Legislative Council, 1915–1929
- John W. Carr (1874–1932), American politician from North Dakota
- John Carr, pseudonym of L. E. Katterfeld (1881–1974), American socialist
- John C. Carr (mayor) (1891/2–1967), mayor of Medford, Massachusetts
- John B. Carr (1906–1969), Massachusetts state politician
- John Carr (New Hampshire politician) (fl. 2016–2018), member of the New Hampshire House of Representatives

== Sportspeople ==
- Johnny Carr (1887–?), American baseball player
- John Carr (cricketer, born 1892) (1892–1963), English cricketer and British Army officer
- John Carr (cricketer, born 1963), English cricketer and cricket administrator
- Cornelius Carr (John Thomas Carr, born 1969), English boxer

== Writers and editors ==
- John Carr (writer, born 1722) (1722–1807), British schoolmaster and writer
- Sir John Carr (travel writer) (1772–1832), English barrister and travel writer
- John Dickson Carr (1906–1977), American author of detective stories
- John C. Carr (editor) (1929–1999), American editor
- John F. Carr (born 1944), American book editor

== Others ==
- John Carr (merchant), 16th-century English merchant and founder of Queen Elizabeth's Hospital School, Bristol
- John Carr (architect) (1723–1807), English architect
- John Carr (Medal of Honor) (1847–1891), decorated for action during the American Indian Wars
- Walter Carr (physician) (John Walter Carr, 1862–1942), British physician and surgeon
- John Carr (Irish trade unionist) (born 1945/46), Irish trade union leader
- John Carr (military lawyer), American prosecutor at the Guantanamo Bay detainment camp
- John Carr, a.k.a. Oliver Stone, a fictional character created by David Baldacci, a member of the Camel Club

== See also ==
- Jack Carr (disambiguation)
