= Opening Day =

Day on which professional baseball leagues begin their regular season

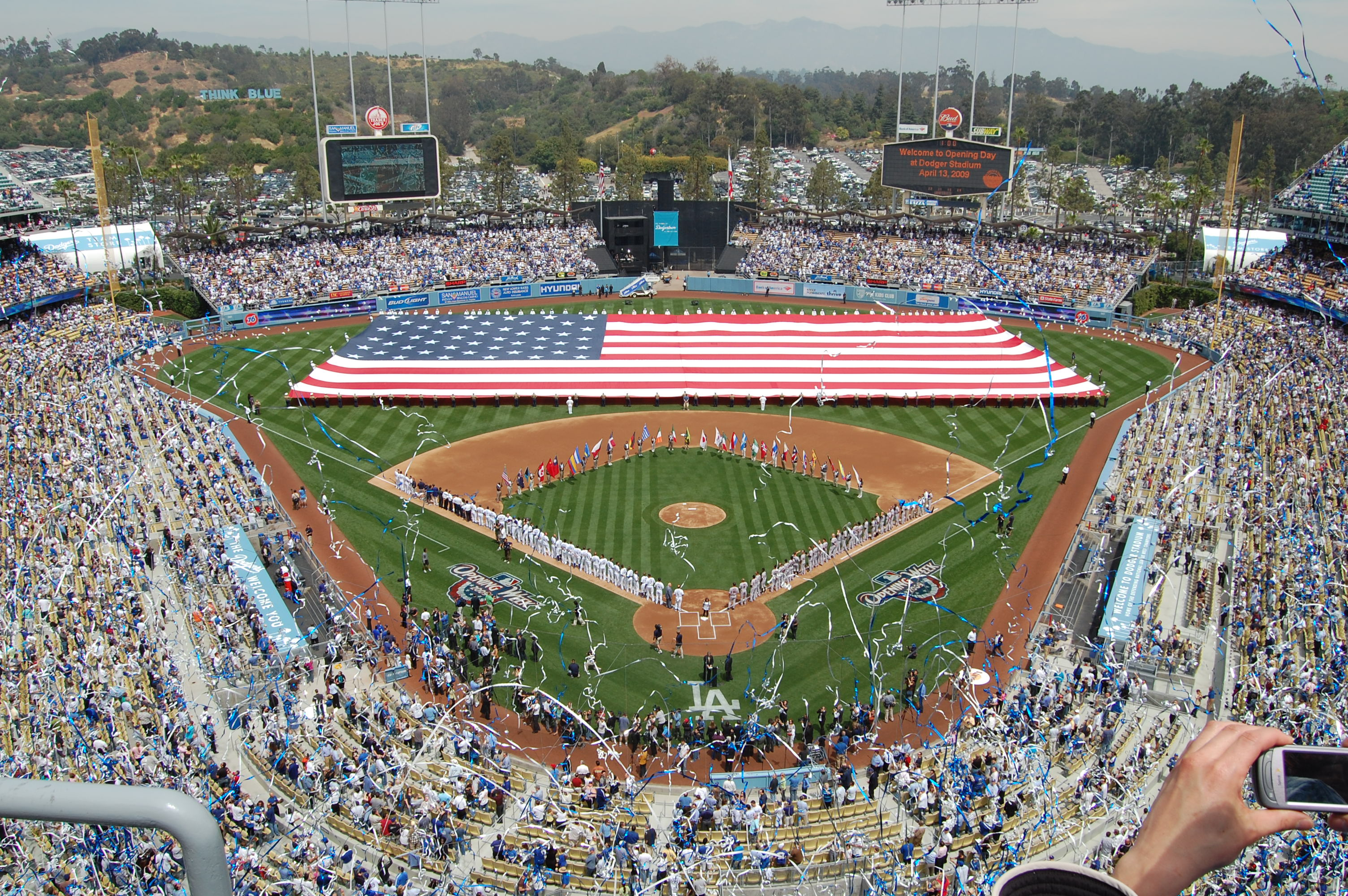
- 2009 Opening Day at Dodger Stadium in Los Angeles
- Observed by: United States, Canada
- 2025 date: March 27
- 2026 date: March 25/26/27
- Frequency: Annual

Opening Day is the day on which professional baseball leagues begin their regular season. For Major League Baseball (MLB) and most of the American minor leagues, this day typically falls during the first week of April, although in recent years it has occasionally fallen in the last week of March. Since 2023, Opening Day falls on the last Thursday of March. In Nippon Professional Baseball (NPB), this day typically falls during the last week of March.

For baseball fans, Opening Day serves as a symbol of rebirth; writer Thomas Boswell once penned a book titled Why Time Begins on Opening Day. Pre-season exhibition games are usually played in the month before Opening Day, during spring training. A home opener is a team's first game of the season on their home field.

Equivalents to Opening Day occur throughout the sport, including minor leagues, college baseball, high school, and youth leagues. Because MLB generally begins its season earlier than the other professional baseball leagues, its Opening Day is the one most commonly recognized by the general public. Most minor leagues start a few days later, but within the same week; the short season Class A and Rookie leagues are exceptions, as they begin in June. College, high school and youth baseball seasons vary widely depending on location and weather conditions.

== History ==
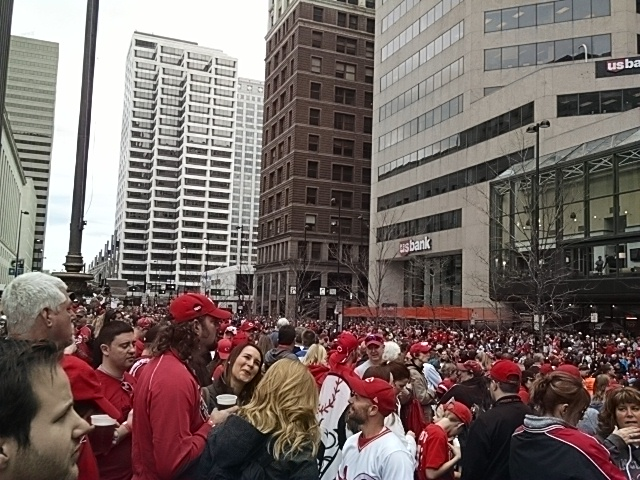
The Findlay Market Parade at Fountain Square in Downtown Cincinnati in 2015. The parade has been held annually since 1920 to celebrate Opening Day in Cincinnati.

For generations, Opening Day has arrived amid pageantry. In Cincinnati, home of the sport's first all-professional team, the annual Findlay Market Parade marks an official "city holiday" with young and old alike taking the day off to cheer on the Reds. For decades, the first pitch of every major league season officially took place in Cincinnati, and the Reds remain the only major league team scheduled to always open the season with a home game (the sole exceptions, since the beginning of the 20th century, being in 1966, when they started the season at Philadelphia after rain washed out the opening series in Cincinnati; 1990, when due to a lockout affecting the schedule they opened the season at Houston; and 2022, when another lockout led to their opening the season at Atlanta). The Chicago Cubs have been the Reds' most frequent Opening Day opponent, visiting Cincinnati for 36 season openers, most recently in 2007. The Pittsburgh Pirates, against whom the current Reds organization played their first opener in 1882, are a close second with 32, most recently in 2023; no other team has more than 19 (by the St. Louis Cardinals, most recently in 2014), largely due to the Cubs and Pirates rotating as the Opening Day opponents from 1899 to 1916, then the two teams and the Cardinals rotated from 1917 to 1952. Following the then-Boston Braves relocation to Milwaukee during the 1953 spring training, the Braves swapped schedules with the Pirates and the Opening Day opponent for the Reds began to be rotated amongst the rest of the National League. Fittingly, the Reds were also the first team to host an Interleague game on Opening Day when the team hosted the Los Angeles Angels of Anaheim in the first year of year-round Interleague play in 2013.

Since 1994 ESPN has often televised a regular-season game the night before "Opening Day" and recent years have seen the staging of season-opening series in Mexico, Puerto Rico, Japan, and Australia. While these are technically "opening games", Major League Baseball still reserves the title "Opening Day" for the first day in which multiple games are played. (For the first time ever, three televised games were played on Sunday, April 3, 2016, before the traditional "Opening Day" slate of games on Monday, April 4.)

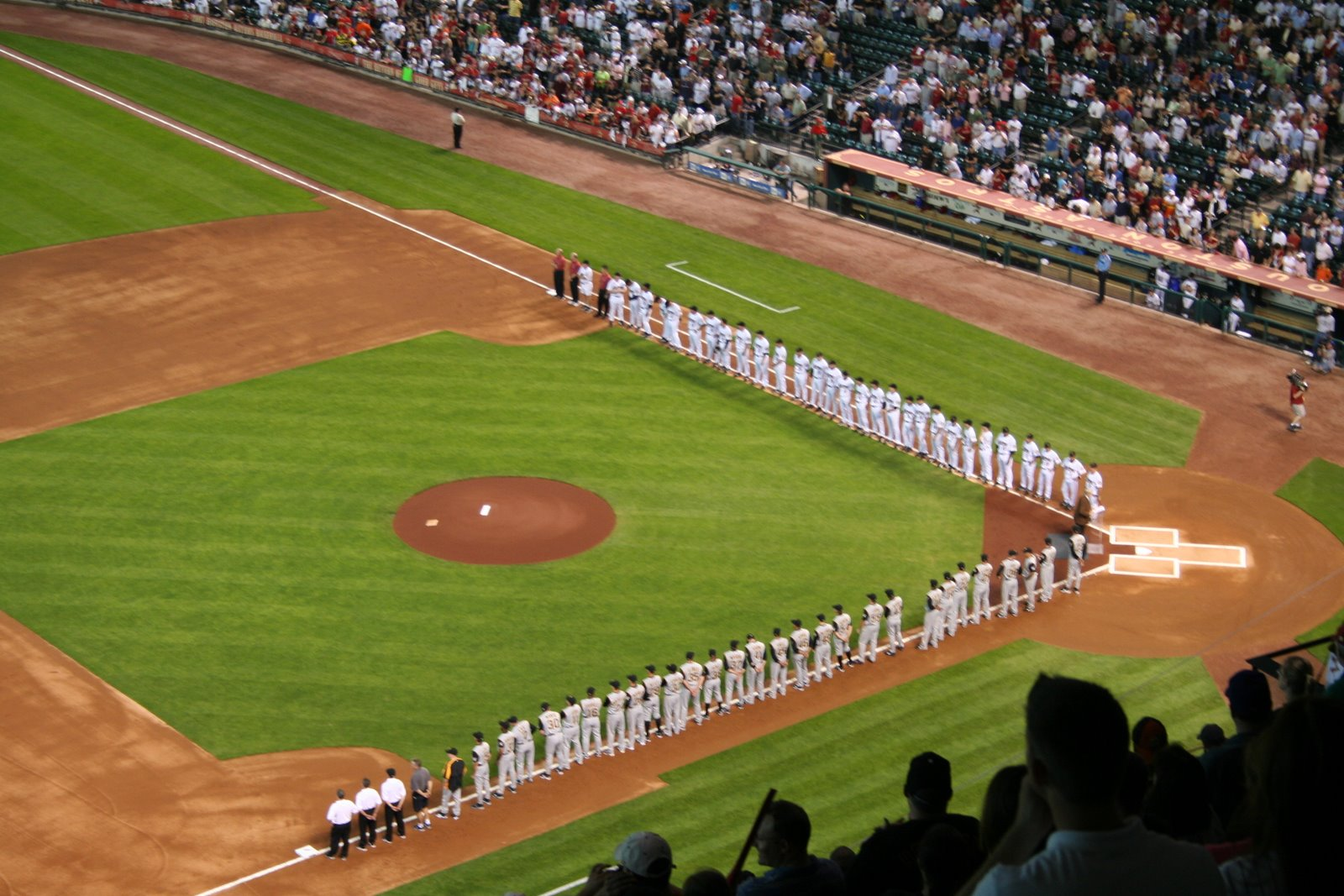
Opening Day introductions at Minute Maid Park on April 2, 2007

Opening Day is a state of mind as well, with countless baseball fans known to recognize this unofficial holiday as a good reason to call in sick at work or be truant from school (as most teams typically play their home opener on a weekday afternoon) and go out to the ballpark for the first of 162 regular season games. Teams' home openers serve as the only regular season games during the year in which the entire rosters of both teams as well as coaches and clubhouse staff are introduced to the crowd prior to the games; for the rest of the year, ballparks only introduce the starting lineups and the teams' managers. Some teams, among them the New York Mets, have had their broadcasters as the master of pre-game ceremonies for their home openers, which also typically feature appearances by retired players, local celebrities or media personalities, politicians, and other dignitaries.

Prior to Opening Day, the teams' managers have to decide the starting pitchers for the game, an assignment typically given to the ace of each team's staff. For a pitcher to start on Opening Day is considered an honor, regardless of whether they are on the home or visiting team. Hall of Fame pitcher Early Wynn, who played for the Washington Senators, Cleveland Indians and Chicago White Sox, once said: "An opener is not like any other game. There's that little extra excitement, a faster beating of the heart. You have that anxiety to get off to a good start, for yourself and for the team. You know that when you win the first one, you can't lose 'em all."

In 2014, Ozzie Smith, with the support of Anheuser-Busch, began a campaign using the We the People site on WhiteHouse.gov to petition the U.S. government to make Opening Day an official national holiday.

== Memorable moments ==
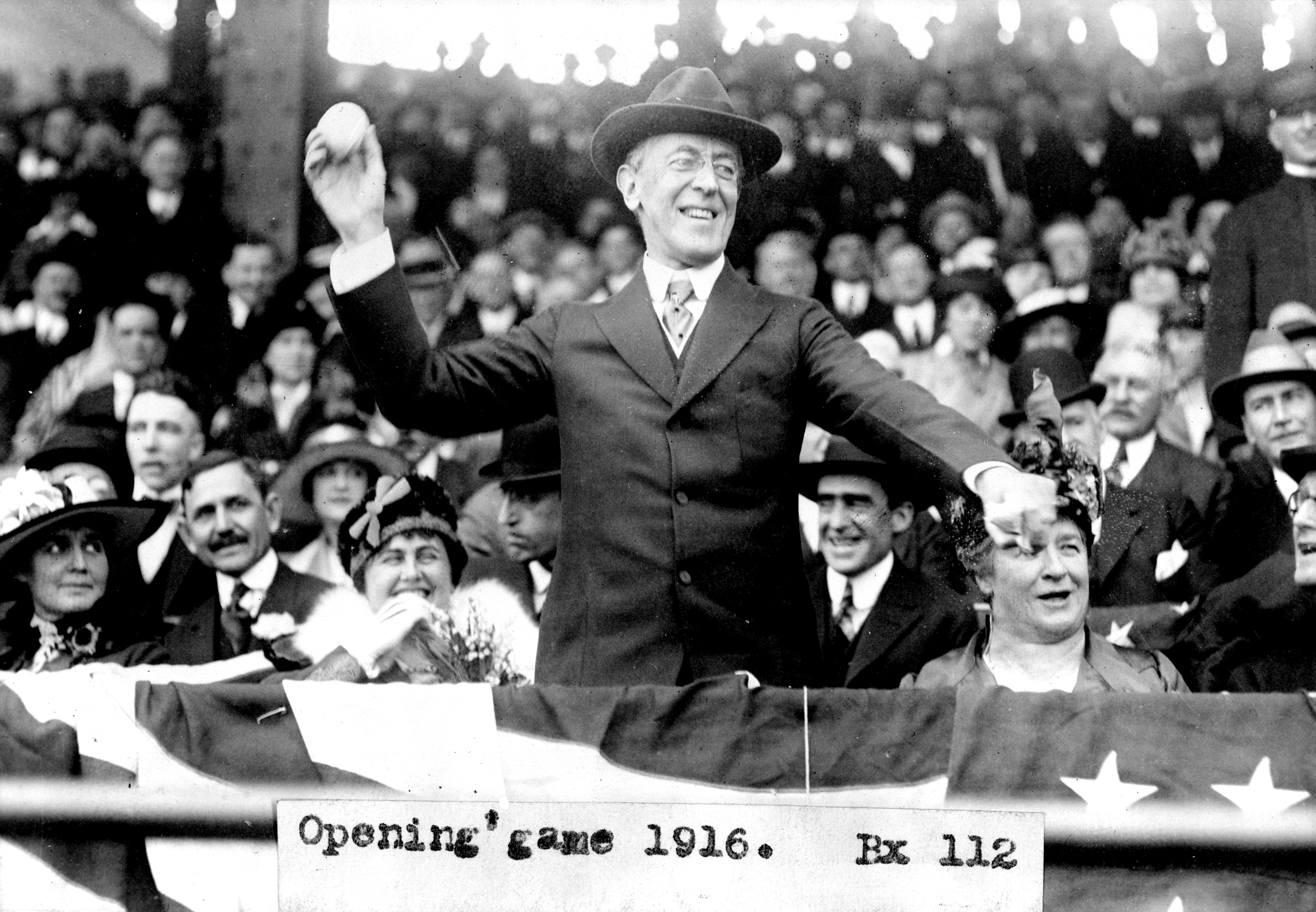
President Woodrow Wilson throws out the ceremonial first pitch on Opening Day in 1916

In 1907, the New York Giants forfeited their game at the Polo Grounds to the Philadelphia Phillies, 9–0, after rowdy fans made and threw snowballs. Without police available to restore order, umpire Bill Klem awarded the game to the Phillies.

In 1940, Cleveland Indians pitcher Bob Feller threw a no-hitter to open the season against the Chicago White Sox. It remains the only no-hitter in Opening Day history.

Twelve U.S. presidents have thrown the ceremonial first pitch of the season. On April 14, 1910, baseball enthusiast William Howard Taft attended the Washington Senators' home opener at National Park, becoming the first U.S. president to open the season in this manner. Harry S. Truman threw first pitches with both his right and left arm in 1950. On April 4, 1994, Bill Clinton inaugurated the Cleveland Indians' new ballpark, then known as Jacobs Field and now as Progressive Field, with the first pitch. George W. Bush did the honors to inaugurate Nationals Park for the Washington Nationals on March 30, 2008.

Ted Williams was a .449 hitter in openers, with three home runs and fourteen runs batted in during fourteen such games and at least one hit in each game.

On April 4, 1974, Hank Aaron of the Atlanta Braves hit his 714th career home run on Opening Day at Cincinnati's Riverfront Stadium, tying Babe Ruth on Major League Baseball's all-time list. Aaron finished his career with 755 home runs.

In 14 season openers for the Washington Senators, Walter Johnson pitched a record nine shutouts. Two of his more famous starts include a 3–0 victory over the Philadelphia Athletics in 1910 and a 1–0 marathon victory while battling the A's Eddie Rommel for 15 innings.

On March 29, 2018, Matt Davidson of the Chicago White Sox hit three home runs in his team's opener against the Kansas City Royals at Kansas City's Kauffman Stadium. He became the fourth major leaguer with three home runs on Opening Day, following the Toronto Blue Jays' George Bell in 1988, Chicago Cubs' Tuffy Rhodes in 1994 and the Detroit Tigers' Dmitri Young in 2005.

The St. Louis Cardinals were the first major league team to open their home season with a night game, beating the Pittsburgh Pirates 4–2 at Sportsman's Park on April 18, 1950.

The first interleague Opening Day game was played between the Los Angeles Angels of Anaheim (AL) and the Cincinnati Reds (NL) on April 1, 2013 at Cincinnati's Great American Ball Park. The Angels won the game in 13 innings, 3–1.

The longest Opening Day game in major league history was played on April 5, 2012 between the Cleveland Indians and Toronto Blue Jays. The game, played at Cleveland's Progressive Field, ended with the Blue Jays beating the Indians, 7–4, in 16 innings. The previous record for longest Opening Day game was on April 19, 1960, at Cleveland Stadium. That game, lasting 15 innings, also saw the Indians in a losing effort, 4–2, versus the Detroit Tigers. The Philadelphia Athletics and Washington Senators also played a 15-inning season opener on April 13, 1926, with Washington winning, 1–0, at home.

On rare occasions, predominantly in the early 20th century, a team would open its home season with a doubleheader. The first of these came when the Boston Americans hosted the Philadelphia Athletics for two games on April 20, 1903, with Boston winning the first game, 9–4, and Philadelphia taking the second game, 10–7. The most recent Opening Day doubleheader in the major leagues came on April 7, 1971, with the Chicago White Sox defeating the host Oakland Athletics in both games (6–5 and 12–4, respectively).

In 1968, Greg Washburn, a pitcher in the California Angels organization, pitched two Opening Day games in the same year—first for the San Jose Bees of the California League, and then for the Quad City Angels of the Midwest League. Washburn won both openers 2–0. This is the only record of a pitcher pitching two openers in the same year in professional baseball.

Hall of Famer Tom Seaver holds the record among major league pitchers for the most Opening Day starts, doing the honors 16 times in his career with the New York Mets, Cincinnati Reds, and Chicago White Sox.

The record for most consecutive victories on Opening Day by a team in history is ten, shared by the Boston Beaneaters (1887–1896) and the Houston Astros (2013–2022). The team with the best Opening Day record of all time is the New York Mets with a .646 (42-23) win percentage.

== Recent opening days ==
Major League Baseball had most of its teams open the 2011 season on a Thursday (March 31) or Friday (April 1) rather than the traditional Monday, in order to prevent the World Series from extending into November. Similarly, most teams opened the 2012 season on Thursday (April 5) or Friday (April 6). However, subsequent seasons through 2017 returned to Monday openers for most teams. For the 2018 season, all 30 teams were scheduled to open the season on Thursday, March 29 (the earliest domestic start for a regular season in MLB history, and the first time since 1968 that all major league teams were scheduled to start the season on the same day, although two games were subsequently rained out and postponed to Friday, March 30). In 2019, MLB scheduled an even earlier opening day for most teams on Thursday, March 28; this excludes a two-game series on March 20 and 21 between the Seattle Mariners and Oakland Athletics at the Tokyo Dome in Japan. The opening of the 2020 season was originally scheduled for Thursday, March 26, but was rescheduled to Thursday, July 23 and Friday, July 24 due to the COVID-19 pandemic. The 2021 season opened on Thursday, April 1. The opening of the 2022 season, originally scheduled for Thursday, March 31, was delayed to Thursday, April 7 due to the 2021–22 lockout.

The 2023 Major League Baseball season opened on Thursday, March 30. It was the first time since 1968 that all major league teams played and the first opening day that 30 teams played as there were only 20 teams in 1968. The opening of the 2024 season occurred on Thursday, March 28; 28 of the 30 teams played their first game of the season, with the Los Angeles Dodgers and San Diego Padres having played their opening game March 20 at the Gocheok Sky Dome in South Korea. The opening of the 2025 season occurred on Thursday, March 27; 26 of the 30 teams played their first game of the season, with the Los Angeles Dodgers and Chicago Cubs having played their opening game March 18 at the Tokyo Dome in Japan, and the Colorado Rockies and Tampa Bay Rays opening their season on Friday, March 28 at the Rays' temporary home of George M. Steinbrenner Field.

For the 2026 season, Opening Day occurred across three days. The opening game took place on March 25, with the New York Yankees visiting the San Francisco Giants. March 26 saw 11 Opening Day games involving 22 teams, and March 27 saw six teams open their season across three games.

== International opening games ==
Season	City	Venue	Guest team	Score	Home team	Ref
1999	(Mexico) Monterrey	Estadio de Béisbol Monterrey	Colorado Rockies	8–2	San Diego Padres	
2000	(Japan) Tokyo	Tokyo Dome	Chicago Cubs	5–3	New York Mets	
2000	(Japan) Tokyo	Tokyo Dome	New York Mets	5–1	Chicago Cubs	
2001	(Puerto Rico) San Juan	Hiram Bithorn Stadium	Texas Rangers	1–8	Toronto Blue Jays	
2004	(Japan) Tokyo	Tokyo Dome	New York Yankees	3–8	Tampa Bay Devil Rays	
2004	(Japan) Tokyo	Tokyo Dome	New York Yankees	12–1	Tampa Bay Devil Rays	
2008	(Japan) Tokyo	Tokyo Dome	Boston Red Sox	6–5	Oakland Athletics	
2008	(Japan) Tokyo	Tokyo Dome	Boston Red Sox	1–5	Oakland Athletics	
2012	(Japan) Tokyo	Tokyo Dome	Seattle Mariners	3–1	Oakland Athletics	
2012	(Japan) Tokyo	Tokyo Dome	Seattle Mariners	1–4	Oakland Athletics	
2014	(Australia) Sydney	Sydney Cricket Ground	Los Angeles Dodgers	3–1	Arizona Diamondbacks	
2014	(Australia) Sydney	Sydney Cricket Ground	Los Angeles Dodgers	7–5	Arizona Diamondbacks	
2019	(Japan) Tokyo	Tokyo Dome	Seattle Mariners	9–7	Oakland Athletics	
2019	(Japan) Tokyo	Tokyo Dome	Seattle Mariners	5–4 (12)	Oakland Athletics	
2024	(South Korea) Seoul	Gocheok Sky Dome	Los Angeles Dodgers	5–2	San Diego Padres	
2024	(South Korea) Seoul	Gocheok Sky Dome	San Diego Padres	15–11	Los Angeles Dodgers	
2025	(Japan) Tokyo	Tokyo Dome	Los Angeles Dodgers	4–1	Chicago Cubs	
2025	(Japan) Tokyo	Tokyo Dome	Los Angeles Dodgers	6–3	Chicago Cubs	

== Quotes ==
In the beginning, there was no baseball. But ever since, there have been few beginnings as good as the start of a new baseball season. It is the most splendid time in sport, in part because baseball is about the only sport left—now that football players report to training camp before the Fourth of July, and hockey players start skating in Indian summer—that still has a time and is true to it.

— B. J. Phillips

There is no sports event like Opening Day of baseball, the sense of beating back the forces of darkness and the National Football League.

— George Vecsey

You always get a special kick on Opening Day, no matter how many you go through. You look forward to it like a birthday party when you're a kid. You think something wonderful is going to happen.

— Joe DiMaggio

A home opener is always exciting, no matter if it's home or on the road.

— Yogi Berra
