= Namao =

Namao may refer to:

- CFB Edmonton, a Canadian Forces Base in Sturgeon County adjacent to Edmonton, Alberta, Canada located in the hamlet of Namao.
- Namao, Alberta, a hamlet in Sturgeon County, Alberta, Canada
- Namao, Alberta (designated place), a designated place in Sturgeon County, Alberta, Canada
- The Namao a research ship based on Lake Winnipeg formerly a Canadian Coast Guard vessel.
