= Seed Catalogue =

1977 poetry collection by Robert Kroetsch

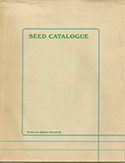
- Author: Robert Kroetsch
- Language: English
- Published: 1977 (Turnstone Press)
- Publication place: Canada
- Media type: Print (paperback)
- Pages: 48 pp (first edition)

Seed Catalogue is a long poem by the Canadian poet Robert Kroetsch published in 1977 by Turnstone Press. Called one of the "most-studied long poems in Canadian literature," and compared to the work of Walt Whitman, the poem explores prairie life and was inspired by a seed catalogue Kroetsch saw at Calgary's Glenbow Museum.
