= Canadian School of Feminist Translation =

School of thought

The Canadian School of Feminist Translation is a school of thought that originated from the works of several Canadian authors and translators. The School emphasizes the role of Canadian translators in coining the term "feminist translation". It is a practice that prioritizes the importance of translators in the history of feminism and advocates for the rights of women to obtain feminist theory, writings, and material in their native languages. Canada's bilingual nature played a major part in developing feminist translation largely because of the built-in gender binary of the French language.

== History ==
Many say that Canada is the birthplace of Feminist Translation, but it has been a practice since long before The Canadian School of Feminist Translation. There are some instances of feminist translation that date back to the eighteenth century. Because of their gender, female authors were forced to use pseudonyms to allow for their work to be published. Therese Huber for instance was a woman who had to publish her work under her husband's name, Georg Forster.

The Canadian School of Feminist Translation was conceptualized during the late 1970s and early 1980s in Quebec, Canada. At the time French feminist writings and authors were very popular in Quebec, and this led to a need for translators to translate the documents from French to English. Female translators such as Barbara Godard, Sherry Simon, and Translation Scholar Dr. Luise von Flotow were tasked with interpreting the French works into English. Because French is heavily influenced by gender, it was important for the authors involved to uncenter the patriarchal wording from the French texts in their English translations.
