= Bloody Jack =

Bloody Jack may refer to:

- "Bloody Jack", the nickname of 19th century Māori chief Tūhawaiki.
- Bloody Jack (poetry), a book of poetry by Dennis Cooley.
- Bloody Jack (novel), a young adult book written by L.A. Meyer.
- "Bloody Jack", a song by Serge Gainsbourg from his 1968 album Gainsbourg & Brigitte Bardot: Initials B.B..
