= Dennis Cooley =

Canadian writer and professor

- Born: 1944 (age 81–82); Estevan, Saskatchewan, Canada
- Education: Bachelor of Education Degree, Honours Bachelor of Arts Degree, Masters of Arts Degree, Ph.D
- Occupations: Writer, editor
- Writing career
- Language: English

Dennis Cooley (born 1944) is a Canadian writer of poetry and criticism, a retired university professor, and a vital figure in the evolution of the prairie long poem. He was raised on a farm near the small city of Estevan, Saskatchewan in Canada, and currently resides in Winnipeg, Manitoba.

Cooley's self-proclaimed influences in writing are William Carlos Williams, H.D., Robert Duncan, Charles Olson, E.E. Cummings, Eli Mandel, Andrew Suknaski, Daphne Marlatt, bpNichol, Michael Ondaatje, and Robert Kroetsch.

== Early life ==
As a student, Cooley held a variety of different labouring jobs during the summers. First attending secondary schooling at the University of Saskatchewan, Cooley obtained with added Distinction his Bachelor of Education Degree in 1966, a High Honours Bachelor of Arts Degree in 1967 and afterwards upgraded to his Masters of Arts Degree on Stephen Crane's imagery and symbolism in 1968.

Cooley later moved to New York state to attend the University of Rochester. It was there that Cooley prepared the research for his doctorate on the San Francisco-born American poet, Robert Duncan. He received the Ph. D in 1971.

== Career ==
From 1972 to 1973, Cooley was employed within the Blakeney Government in Saskatchewan as an executive assistant. Apart from this, most of Cooley's working life has been teaching English.

He has worked at St. John's College since 1976 as the Organizer of Literary Conferences within the University of Manitoba

He has since helped start create the Manitoba Writers’ Guild, and is currently President. The Guild, founded in 1981 in Aubigny, Manitoba as a support group for Manitoba writers, offers workshops, conducts local reading groups and a peer support network for enhancing and encouraging other writers of all skill levels.

Cooley is also an editor, and from 1975 to 1976 was the Assistant Editor on the Journal of Canadian Fiction, the Poetry Editor of Arts Manitoba from 1978 to 1979 and 1982–1983, the Contributing Editor to Border Crossings from 1989 to 1993, as well as the Editor at the Pachyderm Press from 1993 onward. He also served as the Workshop Leader at the Sage Hill Writing Experience in 1992, 1998, 1999, and 2000.

Cooley is a founding editor of the Turnstone Press in Winnipeg, Manitoba, which was created in 1976 in a local Winnipeg pub. Turnstone promotes authors who are either landed immigrants or Canadian citizens, with fifty percent featuring local Manitoba content and Manitoban writers.

=== Writing ===
To date, Cooley has published a dozen volumes of poetry, and over a hundred various articles, columns, reviews, and interviews. Cooley specializes in different genres of poetry; such as literary travel, literary criticism, and the long poem. He shows special interest in Canadian Literature, American Writing, modern and postmodern writing, the languages of orality and print, poetry and politics, and literary theory.

Cooley has travelled abroad to share his talent by giving workshops, lectures and readings to places such as Ukraine and Russia (Kyiv, Odesa, Lviv, Chernivtsi, and Moscow) in May 1991, to the World Poetry Conference in Portugal in May 1995 and again in May 2001, Berlin in August 2002, Poland in April 1999, and Spain in December 1998. Some of his work has been translated into Portuguese, German, Chinese and Ukrainian.

Cooley is currently keeping busy by working on personal travel journals, poetry books, and a plethora of essays.

=== Teaching ===
Cooley taught English at the University of Manitoba from 1973 until 2011, when he retired. He taught Canadian and American literature, poetry, creative writing, and literary theory. His courses explored prairie writing, long poems, and authors including Robert Duncan, Dorothy Livesay, Margaret Atwood, Robert Kroetsch and Eli Mandel.

He also taught as a visiting professor at the University of Trier in Germany in 1990 and the University of Augsburg in Germany in 1996. Outside universities, he led workshops at the Sage Hill Writing Experience in 1992, 1998, 1999 and 2000. He has also given workshops, lectures, and readings in other countries.

The University of Manitoba recognized his teaching with the Olive Beatrice Stanton Award in 1979 and a Teacher Recognition Award in Arts in 2004. In 2019, it named him professor emeritus.

== Recognition ==
=== Awards and honours ===
- 1979: Olive Beatrice Stanton Award for excellence in teaching, University of Manitoba.
- 1987: University of Manitoba Outreach Award.
- 1989: Western Magazine Award for arts commentary.
- 1995: May 5 proclaimed Dennis Cooley Day by the City of Estevan.
- 2000: Named "Favourite Poet" in the Write Readers' Choice poll.
- 2012: Departmental Distinguished Lecturer of the Year Award, University of Windsor, for "A Lover's Question: Staging Romance in Kroetsch's The Sad Phoenician".
- 2013: Manitoba Writers' Guild Lifetime Achievement Award.
- 2015: Life Membership Award, League of Canadian Poets.

=== Award nominations ===
- 1988: McNally Robinson Book Award for Perishable Light.
- 2001: McNally Robinson Book of the Year Award for Irene.
- 2022: McNally Robinson Book of the Year Award for Gibbous Moon, a collaboration with Michael Matthews.

=== Fellowships, scholarships and grants ===
- 1967–1968: University of Saskatchewan Teaching Fellowship.
- 1968–1971: Canada Council award for graduate study.
- 1968–1971: University of Rochester tuition scholarships.
- 1975: University of Manitoba research grant to study Robert Duncan's papers at the Bancroft Library in Berkeley.
- 1981–1982: SSHRC Leave Fellowship.
- 1987: Manitoba Arts Council award to write a screenplay based on Bloody Jack.

=== Visiting appointments and readings ===
- 1990: Visiting professor in Canadian Studies, University of Trier, May–July.
- 1990: Featured reader in the Thomas McGrath reading series, Moorhead State University.
- 1996: Guest professor in Canadian Studies, University of Augsburg.

== Bibliography ==
=== Poetry ===
- Leaving (1980), Turnstone Press. ISBN 0-88801-039-7.
- Fielding (1983), Thistledown Press. ISBN 0-920066-71-2.
- Bloody Jack (1984), Turnstone Press. ISBN 0-88801-091-5.
- Soul Searching (1987), Red Deer College Press. ISBN 0-88995-038-5.
- Dedications (1988), Thistledown Press.
- Perishable Light (1988), Coteau Books. ISBN 0-919926-78-9.
- Burglar of Blood (1992), Pachyderm Press.
- This Only Home (1992), Turnstone Press. ISBN 0-88801-164-4.
- Sunfall (1996), House of Anansi Press.
- Irene (2000), Turnstone Press. ISBN 0-88801-246-2.
- Bloody Jack, second edition (2002), University of Alberta Press. ISBN 0-88864-391-8.
- Seeing Red (2003), Turnstone Press. ISBN 0-88801-277-2.
- Country Music (2004), Kalamalka Press. ISBN 0-9693482-8-2.
- The Bentleys (2006), University of Alberta Press. ISBN 978-0-88864-470-1.
- By Word of Mouth (2007), Wilfrid Laurier University Press. ISBN 978-1-55458-007-1.
- Correction Line (2008), Thistledown Press. ISBN 978-1-897235-50-8.
- The Stones, Turnstone Press. ISBN 978-0-88801-449-8.

=== Literary criticism ===
- The Vernacular Muse (1987), Turnstone Press. ISBN 0-88801-124-5.
- Eli Mandel and His Works (1992), ECW Press.

=== Edited works ===
- Replacing (1980), ECW Press.
- Draft: An Anthology of Prairie Poetry (1981), Turnstone Press.
- In the Name of Narid: New Poems (1981), Porcupine's Quill.
- Inscriptions: Prairie Poetry (1992), Turnstone Press.
