= Border Crossings (magazine) =

Arts magazine

- Editor-in-Chief: Meeka Walsh
- Categories: art magazines
- Frequency: tri-annually
- First issue: 1982
- Based in: Winnipeg, Manitoba, Canada
- Language: English
- Website: www.bordercrossingsmag.com
- ISSN: 0831-2559

Border Crossings is a magazine published tri-annually from Winnipeg, Manitoba, Canada. It investigates contemporary Canadian and international art and culture. The magazine includes interviews with artists, profiles, exhibition reviews, and portfolios of drawings and photographs. The magazine covers various forms of arts including paintings, performances, architecture, sculpture and films.

== History ==
Border Crossings was founded in 1982 by Robert Enright under the title Arts Manitoba. Robert Enright had returned to Manitoba in 1972 to do his post-graduate studies at the University of Manitoba in the English department. During this time a group of professors at St. John's College were toying with the idea of starting a literary press, and thus began the Turnstone Press in 1975. It was because of this literary press that Arts Manitoba came into existence. Arts Manitoba had originally intended to be a bi-monthly magazine, which soon proved difficult. By the winter of 1978 they began listing the magazine as "Special Double issues", which would eventually turn into the quarterly publication it is today. The magazine almost met its end in 1978 when owners were confronted with massive debt.

However, in 1982 it had a second chance. A small group got together (which included Meeka Walsh) and agreed that Arts Manitoba was worth reviving. They were aware that in order for the magazine to be successful they needed government funding and they needed to restructure the magazine. Eventually the members of the board realized that their current magazine title restricted their literary audience. Their first step to a new title was Volume 4, Number 4 titled "Special Canada/U.S. issue". Only a few issues later the title had made the transition to Border Crossings: A Quarterly Magazine of the Arts from Manitoba. In 1993 Meeka Walsh became the official editor of Border Crossings. Her first issue as editor was titled "Silencers", featuring the painter, sculptor and performance artist Gathie Falk. Over the years the magazine has explored themes like War, Drawing, Animals, Art and Technology, Multiculturism, Landscape, Love, Circus and many more.

== Editors-in-Chief ==
- Robert Enright (1982–1992);
- Meeka Walsh (1993–present)

== Formatting ==
The Border Crossings magazine publishes quarterly in February, May, August and November. Each issue features a different cover portraying a work of art. An example of this is an issue from February 2008: Wangechi Mutu designed the cover named "Perhaps the Moon Will Save Us." The cover is a collage shaped like a moon made from mixed media, blankets, plastic pearls, aluminum foil, animal pelts, packaging tape, ink and other materials.

The first 110 issues of the magazine were in an 8½×11-inch format, saddle-stitched at first, but later perfect bound. The current format is now 9×11 ¾ inches. The layout for the magazine has been renowned for its contemporary design and high production values. The photography portfolios have contributed to the magazine's success as well as several awards for Best Non-Fiction Feature, Manitoba Magazine of the Year and several gold medals from the Western Magazine Awards. Each issue has several articles ranging from films to theatre, from architecture to writing, and many interviews and reviews. The magazine is typically structured with seven different sections: Bordernotes, Borderviews, Bordercolumn, interviews, articles, art pages and crossovers.
