= Arturo Vivante =

Italian-American writer (1923–2008)

- Born: October 17, 1923; Rome, Italy
- Died: April 1, 2008 (aged 84); Wellfleet, Massachusetts, U.S.

Academic background
- Education: McGill University; Sapienza University of Rome

Arturo Vivante (October 17, 1923 in Rome – April 1, 2008 in Wellfleet, Massachusetts) was an Italian-American fiction writer.

== Biography ==
He was the son of Elena (née de Bosis), a painter, and Leone Vivante, a philosopher. The family fled to England in 1938, anticipating the war and the fascist government's anti-Semitic policies, as Leone was Jewish. The British sent Arturo to an internment camp in Canada while his family remained in England for the duration of the war. He graduated from McGill University in 1944 and received his medical degree at University of Rome in 1949. He practiced medicine in Rome until 1958, but thereafter moved to New York to pursue writing full-time.

He married Nancy Adair Bradish in 1958. In 1982, he appeared at the University of North Dakota Writers Conference.

In addition to writing numerous short stories and three novels, Vivante taught writing courses at various colleges from 1968 to 1993, including the University of Michigan, University of Iowa, Bennington College, and MIT. After publication of his final book in 2006, he retired and lived in Wellfleet, Massachusetts until his death two years later.

His work has appeared in The New Yorker over 70 times, as well as other magazines including AGNI, Vogue, The New York Times, London Magazine, The Guardian, Antaeus, TriQuarterly, Santa Monica Review, and The Southern Review. His fiction often drew from autobiographical experiences with attention to the subtlest details of reflective observation.

== Awards ==
- 1976 Italian Communication Award
- 1979 National Endowment for the Arts grant
- 1985 Guggenheim Fellowship
- 2004 Richard Sullivan Prize for short fiction
- 2006 Katherine Anne Porter Award for fiction

== Works ==
=== Novels ===
- A Goodly Babe (Little, Brown, 1966)
- Doctor Giovanni (Little, Brown, 1969)
- Un caso d’amore (Garzanti, 1971)
- Truelove Knot (University of Notre Dame Press, 2006)

=== Stories ===
- The French Girls of Killini (Little, Brown, 1967)
- English Stories (Street Fiction, 1975)
- Run to the Waterfall (Scribner, 1979)
- The Tales of Arturo Vivante (The Sheep Meadow Press, 1990)
- Solitude and Other Stories (University of Notre Dame Press, 2004)

=== Other ===
- Poesie (Carlo Ferrari, 1951)
- Writing Fiction (The Writer, Inc., 1980)
- Italian Poetry, An Anthology: From the Beginnings to the Present (Delphinium Press, 1996)
