= Gimli High School =

Location
- 52 - 7th Ave; Gimli, Manitoba, R0C 1B0; Canada; 50.6350°N 96.9981°W

Information
- School type: High School (Secondary Education)
- School board: Evergreen School Division
- Principal: Leona Groot
- Grades: 9 - 12
- Enrollment: 296 (2021)
- Language: English
- Colours: Blue and Gold
- Mascot: Sea serpent
- Team name: Lakers
- Website: www.esd.ca/school/ghs/Pages/default.aspx

Gimli High School is a Canadian high school located in the town of Gimli, Manitoba. The school is the largest in the Evergreen School Division with an enrollment of 296 students in 2021.
