= 1969 Governor General's Awards =

Canadian literary award

Each winner of the 1969 Governor General's Awards for Literary Merit was selected by a panel of judges administered by the Canada Council for the Arts.

== Winners ==
=== English Language ===
- Fiction: Robert Kroetsch, The Studhorse Man
- Poetry or Drama: George Bowering, Rocky Mountain Foot and The Gangs of Kosmos
- Poetry or Drama: Gwendolyn MacEwen, The Shadow-Maker

=== French Language ===
- Fiction: Louise Maheux-Forcier, Une forêt pour Zoé
- Poetry or Drama: Jean-Guy Pilon, Comme eau retenue
- Non-Fiction: Michel Brunet, Les canadiens après la conquête
