= Gimli, Manitoba =

Settlement in Manitoba, Canada

Gimli
- Community
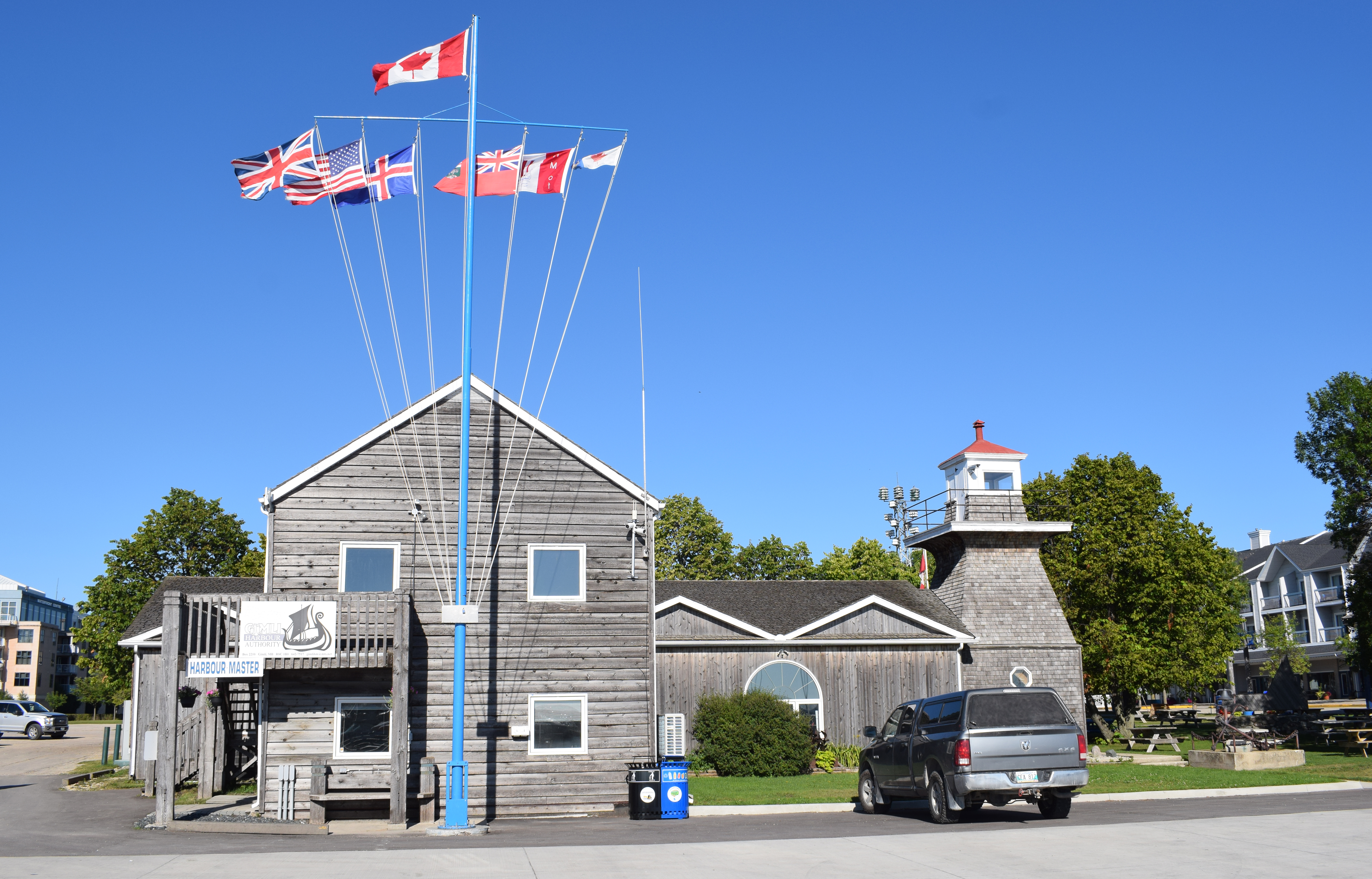
- The Gimli Harbour Master's building and lighthouse, constructed in 1910, rebuilt 1974.

- Location within Manitoba
- Coordinates: 50°38′01″N 96°59′24″W
- Country: Canada
- Province: Manitoba
- Region: Interlake
- Rural Municipality: RM of Gimli
- Demonym: Gimlungur (singular); Gimlungar (plural)
- Founded: October 21, 1875
- Village of Gimli: March 6, 1908
- Town of Gimli: December 31, 1946
- Amalgamated with RM of Gimli: January 1, 2003

Government
  - Mayor: Kevin Chudd
  - MP (Selkirk—Interlake—Eastman): James Bezan (CPC)
  - MLA (Interlake-Gimli): Derek Johnson (PC)

Area
  - Total: 3.02 km^{2} (1.17 sq mi)
- Elevation: 222 m (728 ft)

Population (2021)
  - Total: 2,345
  - Density: 746.6/km^{2} (1,934/sq mi)
- Time zone: UTC-6 (CST)
  - Summer (DST): UTC-5 (CDT)
- Postal code: R0C 1B0
- Area codes: 204, 431

Gimli is an unincorporated community in the Rural Municipality of Gimli on the west side of Lake Winnipeg in Manitoba, Canada. It is located 80 km north of the provincial capital Winnipeg.

The community's first European settlers were Icelanders who were part of the New Iceland settlement in Manitoba. The community maintains a strong connection to Iceland and Icelandic culture today, including the annual Icelandic Festival. Gimli was incorporated as a village on March 6, 1908, and held town status between December 31, 1946, and January 1, 2003, when it amalgamated with the RM of Gimli. Census Canada now recognizes the community as a population centre for census purposes. The 2021 Canadian census recorded a population of 2,345 in the population centre of Gimli.

The town's settlers sustained themselves primarily from agriculture and fishing. Gimli maintains a strong connection to the lake today, tourism has played a part in the town's current economic sustainability. Gimli Beach is popular in the summer, while Gimli Harbour is the largest harbour on Lake Winnipeg and in Western Canada between Ontario and the Pacific Coast.

Gimli held one of the sporting events (rowing) in the 2017 Canada Games.

== History ==
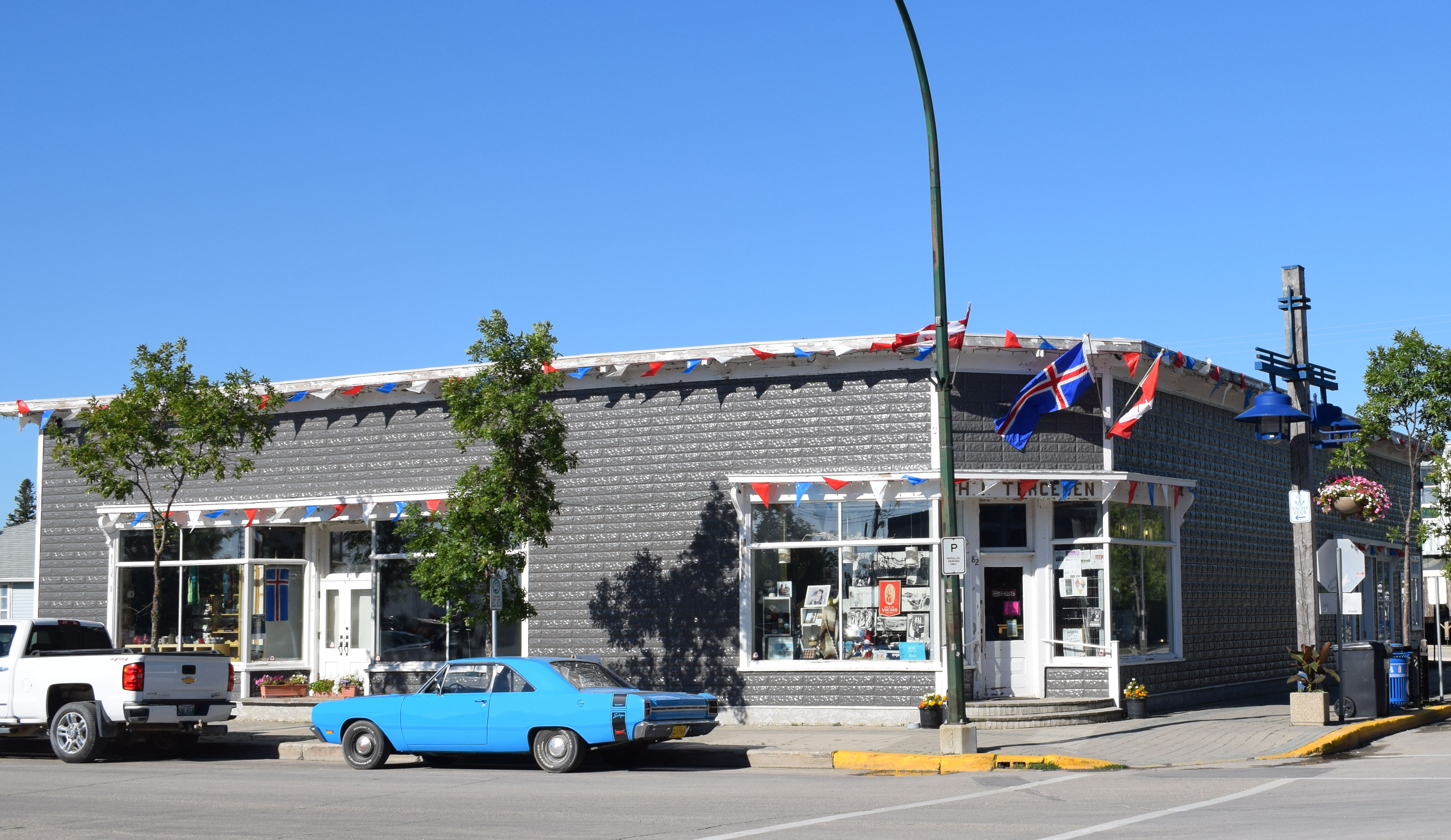
H. P. Tergesen's & Sons in Gimli. The store was constructed in 1898 and still operates today.

The first European settlers in Gimli were Canadian Icelanders. Icelandic immigrants began settling the area in 1875. The Icelandic settlers arrived from Kinmount, Ontario, and settled at the site of Gimli, the new home of New Iceland. Volcanic eruptions in Iceland at the time spurred additional immigration to the Gimli and New Iceland area. Three hundred people left Iceland, arrived in Ontario and took a ship to Duluth, from there they made their way to Grand Forks, North Dakota, and took a steamer up to the mouth of the Assiniboine River. About 75 to 100 people stayed in the Winnipeg area while the rest made their way to Lake Winnipeg on flat boats and one York boat to save money.

In 1875, the settlers landed south of Gimli at Willow Island and then had to walk and carry the remaining goods to the current site of Gimli. A second group of approximately 800 would follow in their footsteps the next year. Three town sites were chosen in New Iceland to be surveyed, Gimli was measured as approximately 1 mile (1.6 km) of lakefront and 0.5 miles (0.80 km) in depth. Of the three towns, Gimli, Lundi, and Sandvik, Gimli is the only one remaining and the only one to have developed exactly as planned. In 1876 the community was hit by a severe outbreak of smallpox. The community of Gimli in New Iceland developed a unique constitution of by-laws for local government which remained in effect until 1887 when provincial municipal laws began.

The Canadian Pacific Railway reached Gimli in 1906 and soon the town and surrounding region became a tourist and vacation destination for people from Winnipeg. By the 1930s the south shore area of Gimli began to see cottages replacing farmland.

During World War II an area west of the community was appropriated by the Royal Canadian Air Force to construct a training facility. RCAF Station Gimli was opened in 1943 and remained in operation until 1945. The Station was reactivated in 1950 and was closed again in 1971.

In 1983, the Gimli Industrial Park Airport became famous when an Air Canada Boeing 767 ran out of fuel over southern Manitoba and successfully glided to a landing at Gimli Motorsport Park. The aircraft in that incident became known as the Gimli Glider.

The Town of Gimli amalgamated with the Rural Municipality of Gimli in 2003, turning the former town into a population centre within the rural municipality. In 2006, Icelandic-Canadian poet David Arnason contributed a naturally washer-shaped "lucky stone" from the shores of Lake Winnipeg at Gimli to the Six String Nation project. The stone was inlaid on the seventh fret of Voyageur, the guitar at the heart of the project, by Sara Nasr.

== Toponymy ==
Gimli is an Icelandic variant form of Gimlé, a place in Nordic mythology, where the righteous survivors of Ragnarök are foretold to live. It is mentioned in the Prose Edda and Völuspá and described as the most beautiful place on Earth, more beautiful than the Sun. The etymology of Gimli is likely "the place protected from fire" based on two Old Nordic elements: gimr "fire" and hlé "protected place".

== Climate ==
Under the Köppen climate classification, Gimli has a humid continental climate (Dfb) with vast temperature differences between summer and winter, owing to its relatively northerly latitude and distance to coastlines. As a result, summers are warm and sometimes hot, with winters sometimes being bitterly cold.

Climate data for Gimli, Manitoba
Month	Jan	Feb	Mar	Apr	May	Jun	Jul	Aug	Sep	Oct	Nov	Dec	Year
Record high °C (°F)	8.2 (46.8)	8.1 (46.6)	15.0 (59.0)	29.2 (84.6)	36.1 (97.0)	36.7 (98.1)	35.0 (95.0)	37.5 (99.5)	36.5 (97.7)	26.1 (79.0)	22.8 (73.0)	6.3 (43.3)	37.5 (99.5)
Mean daily maximum °C (°F)	−12.8 (9.0)	−9.3 (15.3)	−1.8 (28.8)	8.2 (46.8)	16.3 (61.3)	21.6 (70.9)	24.9 (76.8)	23.2 (73.8)	16.9 (62.4)	9.5 (49.1)	−1.1 (30.0)	−10.5 (13.1)	7.1 (44.8)
Daily mean °C (°F)	−18.2 (−0.8)	−14.8 (5.4)	−7.3 (18.9)	2.7 (36.9)	10.6 (51.1)	16.1 (61.0)	19.2 (66.6)	17.5 (63.5)	11.6 (52.9)	4.8 (40.6)	−5.2 (22.6)	−15.4 (4.3)	1.8 (35.2)
Mean daily minimum °C (°F)	−23.5 (−10.3)	−20.3 (−4.5)	−12.8 (9.0)	−2.9 (26.8)	4.7 (40.5)	10.5 (50.9)	13.5 (56.3)	11.8 (53.2)	6.3 (43.3)	0.0 (32.0)	−9.2 (15.4)	−20.3 (−4.5)	−3.5 (25.7)
Record low °C (°F)	−41.2 (−42.2)	−39.4 (−38.9)	−34.4 (−29.9)	−25.6 (−14.1)	−9.5 (14.9)	−1.3 (29.7)	2.8 (37.0)	0.5 (32.9)	−15.8 (3.6)	−16.4 (2.5)	−34.3 (−29.7)	−39.4 (−38.9)	−41.2 (−42.2)
Average precipitation mm (inches)	22.2 (0.87)	17.3 (0.68)	30.0 (1.18)	30.0 (1.18)	49.8 (1.96)	94.1 (3.70)	69.7 (2.74)	64.2 (2.53)	66.7 (2.63)	38.3 (1.51)	27.6 (1.09)	22.5 (0.89)	532.5 (20.96)
Average rainfall mm (inches)	0.3 (0.01)	0.3 (0.01)	8.8 (0.35)	19.8 (0.78)	47.6 (1.87)	94.1 (3.70)	69.7 (2.74)	64.2 (2.53)	65.6 (2.58)	30.3 (1.19)	5.3 (0.21)	1.8 (0.07)	407.8 (16.06)
Average snowfall cm (inches)	27.6 (10.9)	21.7 (8.5)	24.1 (9.5)	11.4 (4.5)	2.2 (0.9)	0 (0)	0 (0)	0 (0)	1.1 (0.4)	8.4 (3.3)	26.6 (10.5)	25.0 (9.8)	148.1 (58.3)
Average precipitation days (≥ 0.2 mm)	12.3	9.2	9.5	8.1	9.9	12.7	11.7	11.6	11.1	10.0	9.4	12.4	127.6
Average rainy days (≥ 0.2 mm)	0.30	0.35	2.5	5.6	9.5	12.7	11.7	11.6	10.9	8.2	2.3	0.53	76.1
Average snowy days (≥ 0.2 cm)	13.9	9.7	8.5	3.7	1.0	0.05	0	0	0.45	2.6	8.6	13.6	62.0
Mean monthly sunshine hours	119.3	141.2	190.3	247.5	284.4	289.6	319.1	271.8	174.8	141.1	94.9	102.4	2,376.4
Source: Environment Canada

== Economy ==
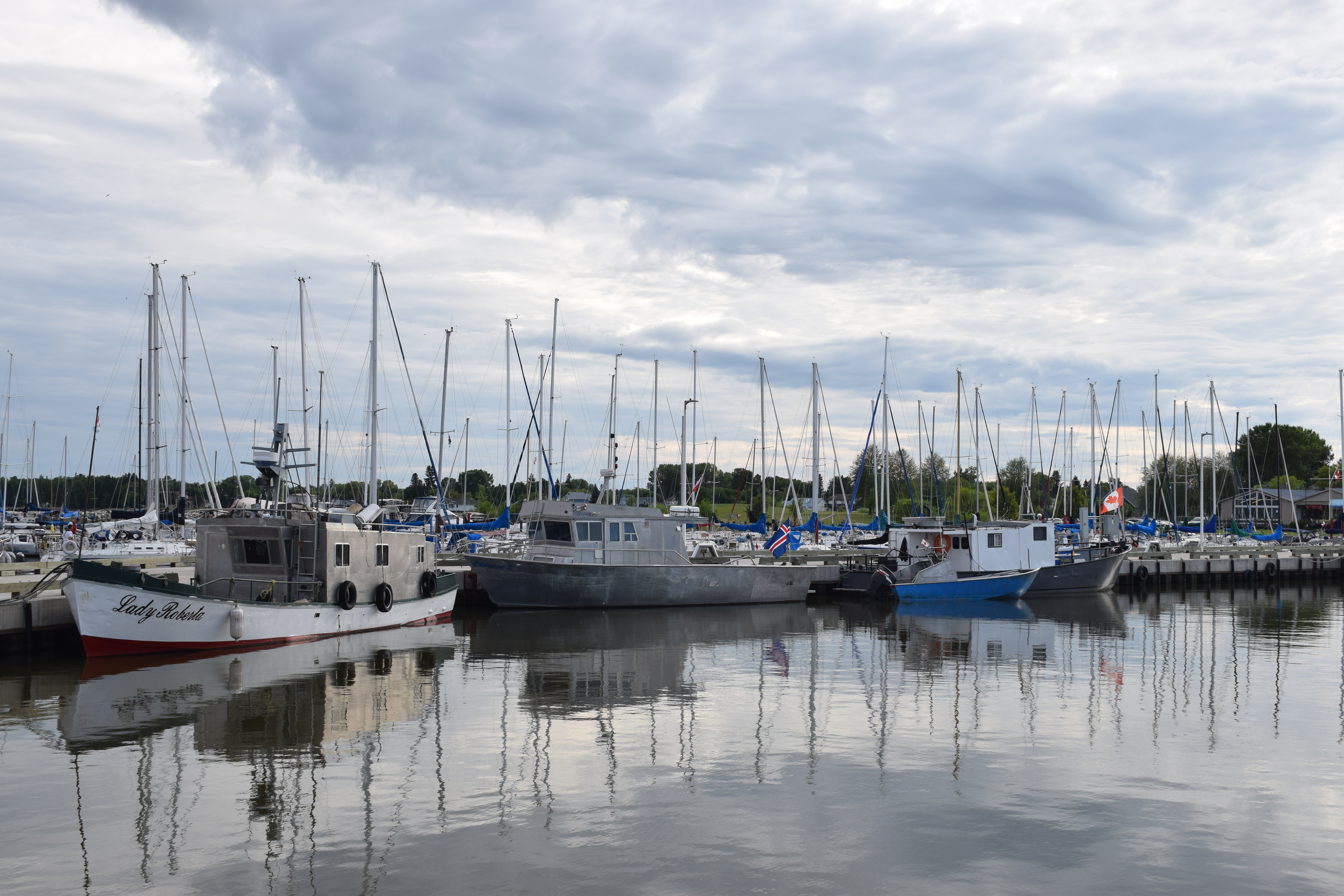
Commercial fishing vessels in the Gimli Harbour.

Fishing has long been a primary driver of the Gimli economy. Today, commercial fishing still features many fourth generation fishers of Icelandic origin. The harbour in Gimli supports over 50 commercial fishing families on Lake Winnipeg. Gimli is part of Area 2 in the Lake Winnipeg fishery and has an overall quota of 1,000,000 kilograms (2,200,000 lb) of mostly pickerel from the south basin of the lake as well as white fish from the north basin. The fish was processed in Gimli since the establishment of the pier in 1900, a main wooden pier then. With the arrival of the Canadian Pacific Railway in 1905, production of the harvested fish grew with fish processing plants establishing in the community. In 1968 the Government of Canada established the Freshwater Fish Marketing Corporation and moved the processing of the fish to Winnipeg.

A main industrial business in Gimli is the Crown Royal whisky distillery. Daily production of Crown Royal uses 10,000 bushels of rye, corn and barley from Manitoba and surrounding provinces, and requires 750,000 imperial gallons (3,400,000 L; 900,000 US gal) of water naturally filtered through the limestone beneath the lake. The Gimli Distillery opened in 1968. The plant employs 80 people with an annual payroll of almost C$4 million. The operation is situated on two quarters of land and comprises a production building, barrel filling and dumping, and 46 warehouses to store the maturing whiskies. The whisky produced at the Manitoba distillery is stored in 1.7 million barrels, located in 56 warehouses over 5 acres (2 ha) of land. The whisky is then blended and bottled in Amherstburg, Ontario.

Faroex Ltd., established in 1981, produces composite components for use in the agricultural, automotive, consumer and military supply industries. Their first product was a flooring and support framing system made from plastic and fibreglass, used in hog production.

== Education ==
- Gimli High School

== Demographics ==
Historical population
Year	Pop.	±%
1981	1,688	—
1986	1,681	−0.4%
1996	1,574	−6.4%
2001	1,657	+5.3%
2006	1,896	+14.4%
2011	2,127	+12.2%
2016	2,251	+5.8%
2021	2,345	+4.2%
Source: Statistics Canada

In the 2021 Census of Population conducted by Statistics Canada, Gimli had a population of 2,070 living in 1,015 of its 1,342 total private dwellings, a change of 4.8% from its 2016 population of 1,975. With a land area of 2.21 km^{2} (0.85 sq mi), it had a population density of 936.7/km^{2} (2,425.9/sq mi) in 2021.

In the Canada 2016 Census, Gimli had 33.6% of the rural municipality's population within the census area. The settlement of Gimli has an aging population with the average age of a Gimlungar at 51.1 years old, this is well over the provincial average of 39.2. This statistical anomaly is a result of Gimli attracting many hundreds of retirees to live and settle down in the community.

Gimli is the cultural heartland of Icelanders in Manitoba and the country as a whole. The community has a concentration of 28.4% residents who claim some Icelandic heritage, though those with Ukrainian, English, and Scottish descent are also notable. English is the mother tongue of 89.3% of Gimlungars with Icelandic, Ukrainian, and German equally dividing those with a different mother tongue. Gimli has a marginal visible minority community with only less than one percent in this category. 11% of Gimlungars identify as Indigenous Canadians, with 6.4% as part of the First Nations community and 4.5% identifying as Métis.

Ethnic Origins (2016)
	Population	Percentage
Icelandic	595	28.4
English	585	27.9
Ukrainian	475	22.7
Canadian	465	22.2
Scottish	430	20.5
German	360	17.2
Irish	270	12.9
Polish	210	10.0

== Culture ==
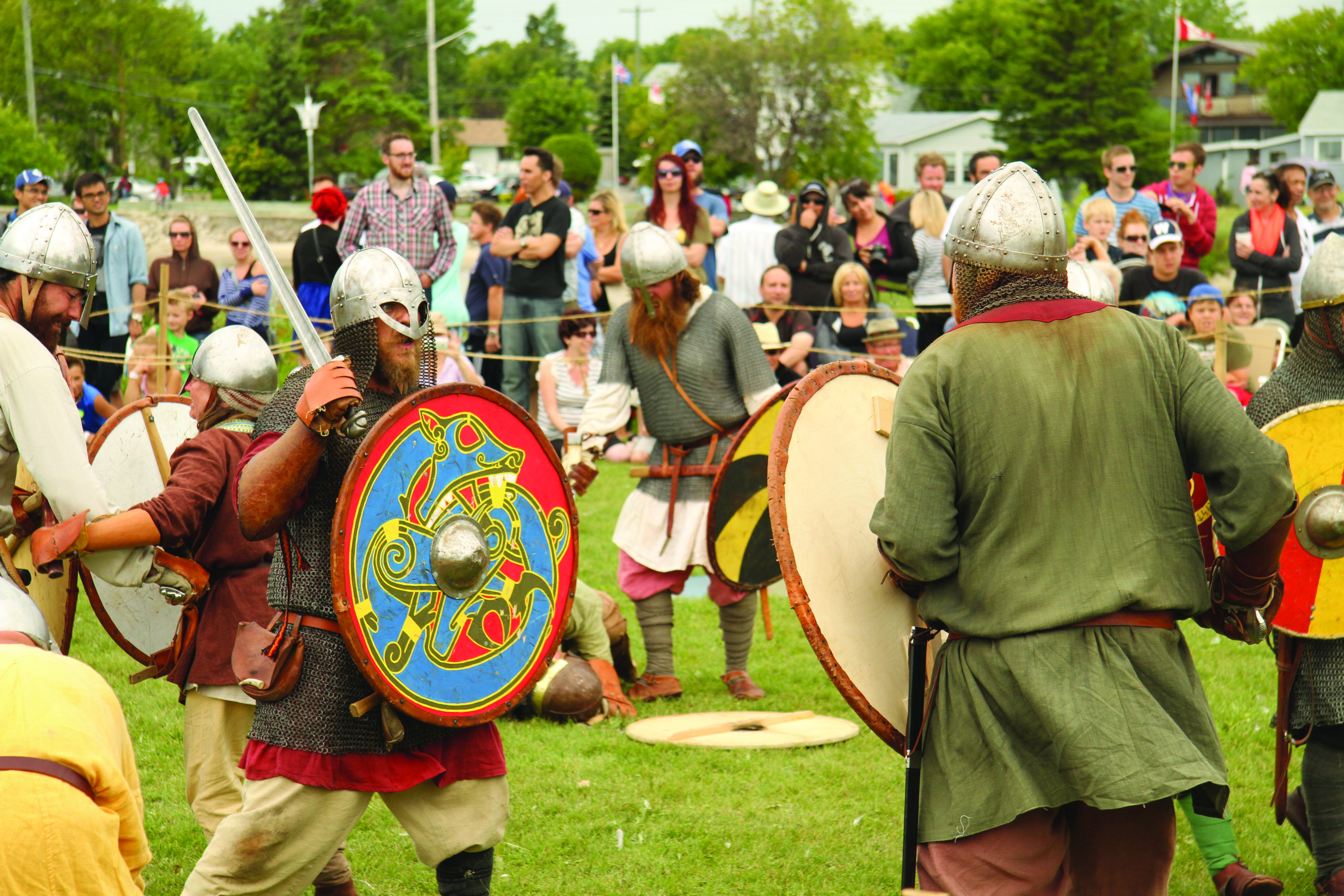
Reenactment of a Norse battle during the Icelandic festival in Gimli.

Gimli is notable for its Icelandic culture and celebrates this locally unique heritage throughout the year and the community of Gimli. A popular sight in the town is the pier which extends from the downtown shoreline out onto Lake Winnipeg and features the Gimli Seawall Gallery, a cement wall 977 feet (298 m) long featuring 72 murals which depict the history and stories of the community. On Lake Winnipeg, Gimli has a fifteen-foot tall statue of a viking; it was unveiled in 1967 and designed by George Barone.

The Gimli Film Festival is a five-day summer film festival held annually; it features an 11-metre (36 ft) outdoor screen on Lake Winnipeg. Winnipeg director Guy Maddin made a feature film titled Tales from the Gimli Hospital.

Curling a popular winter time activity in the town with up to 1,200 people participating in the sport. The community has its own curling club. The club is home to several prominent curlers, including Kerri Einarson, a multiple-time Scotties Tournament of Hearts champion.

=== Icelandic Festival ===
The Icelandic Festival of Manitoba has been celebrated since 1890 and has been held in Gimli since 1932. Several thousand tourists come each year for three days during the first weekend in August. Artworks from jewellery to paintings are displayed at the art museum as well along the pier wall that extends from downtown Gimli into the lake, and traditional Icelandic dishes are offered. A reenactment of a Norse shield wall battle is also held each day, being accompanied by an interactive Norse village where the reenactors perform tasks such as blacksmithing, crafting, and sewing.

=== Sunfest ===
Gimli was the host of the Sunfest rock festival, which was held at Gimli Motorsports Park every August from 1990 to 1996 and was attended by tens of thousands of people every year.

== Infrastructure ==
=== Gimli Harbour ===
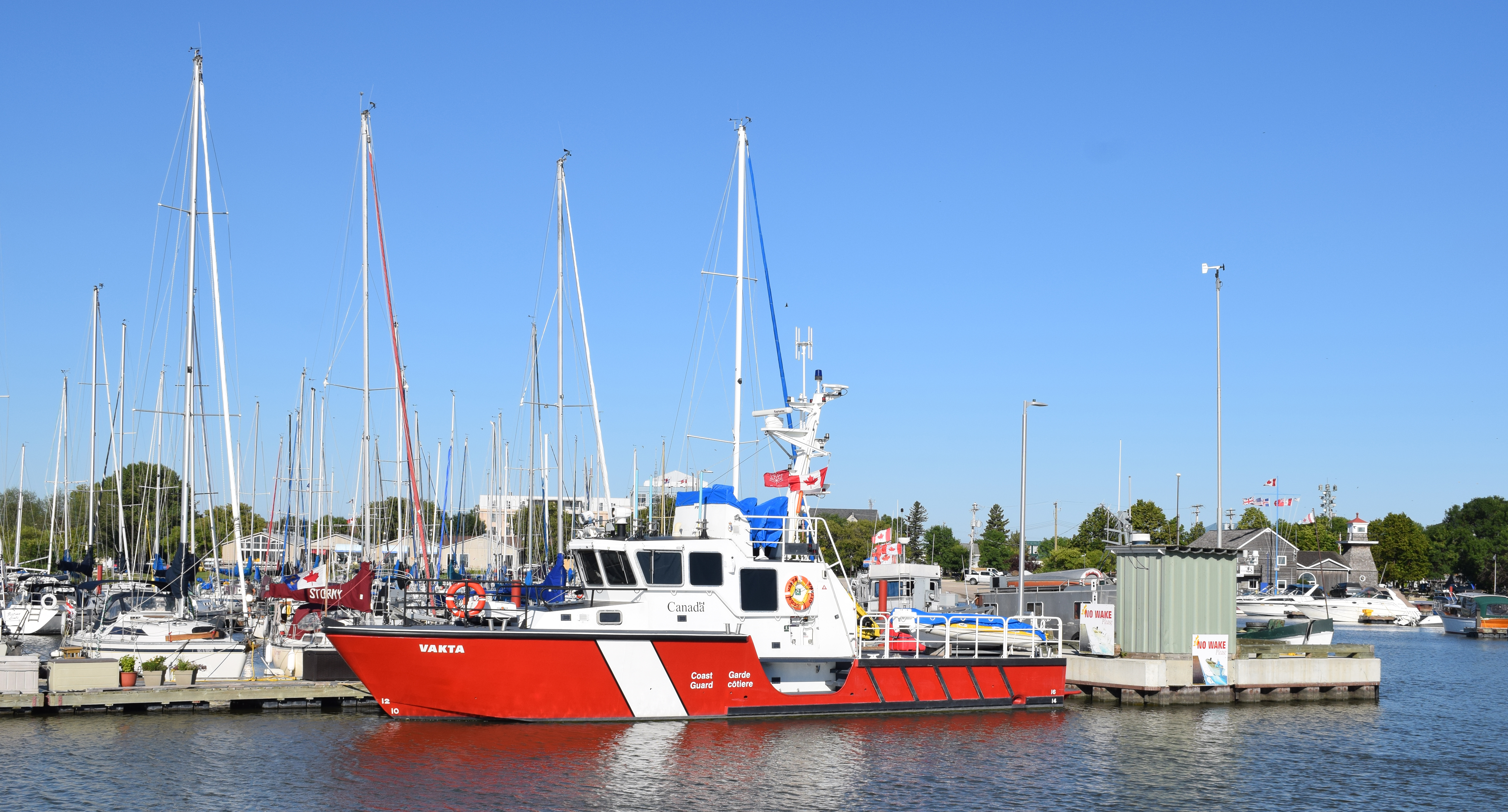
CCGS Vakta docked in the Gimli Harbour, with sailing vessels and the lighthouse in the background.

The Government of Canada provided the community of Gimli with a grant in 1898 to build a harbour in the community. A permanent dock was built in 1900 and a lighthouse was added in 1910. The lighthouse would later be damaged in an ice pileup in 1943, which managed to push it over. The original top of the lighthouse was saved and later put on top of a rebuilt replica in 1974 as part of a tourist attraction. The lighthouse is currently managed by the New Iceland Heritage Museum.

Today the harbour serves as the largest harbour on Lake Winnipeg. It is the site of The Namao, a ship used for scientific research in Lake Winnipeg. It is also the site of a Canadian Coast Guard station and home to CCGS Vakta, the largest coast guard vessel on Lake Winnipeg. The Gimli Harbour remains an important economic driver not only in terms of tourism but also as part of a commercial fishery. An important source of food in the early days of New Iceland, fishing remains an important part of the modern economy today.

The Gimli Yacht Club is located in the harbour and is used for recreational sailing, as well as to continue to teach sailing lessons today. The site has also been used competitively with races taking place in Gimli as part of the 1967 Pan American Games, the 1999 Pan American Games, and the 2017 Canada Summer Games.

=== Utilities ===
In August 2016, the Province and Federal government announced they will cost-share upgrades to the water treatment and distribution systems in the City of Selkirk and the R.M. of Gimli. Estimated total cost of the Gimli upgrade project was C$18 million. The R.M. completed construction in November 2018 and opened a new Water Treatment Plant located at the Gimli Industrial Park, added two wells, replaced 8,000 metres (26,000 ft) of (distribution?) pipes, 1,200 metres (3,900 ft) of water main pipe. The water distribution infrastructure serves Gimli and the nearby cottages of Pelican Beach just north of the community. The project cost a total of C$7 million and was cost-shared by all three levels of government.

== Notable people ==
- David Arnason (1940-2026), writer and English professor born in Gimli.
- Norma Bailey, filmmaker
- Peter Bjornson, Politician, Teacher, Governor General's Award winner and former Minister of Education in Manitoba.
- Kerri Einarson, curler and 2026 World Women's Curling Championship silver medalist / 5-time Scotties Tournament of Hearts champion
- George Johnson: physician and former Minister of Education and Health in Manitoba, as well as the Lieutenant Governor of Manitoba.
- Janis Johnson: the longest-serving senator of Manitoba and founder of the Gimli Film Festival; born in Winnipeg but now lives in Gimli.
- Leo Kristjanson, economist and president of the University of Saskatchewan from 1980 to 1989.
- Guy Maddin, film-maker
- Chris Neufeld, curler
- Eric Stefanson, retired Manitoba Progressive Conservative politician born in Gimli.
- W. D. Valgardson, writer and professor.
- Hans Wuthrich, curling ice technician.
