= CCGS Vakta =

Canadian Coast Guard Vessel

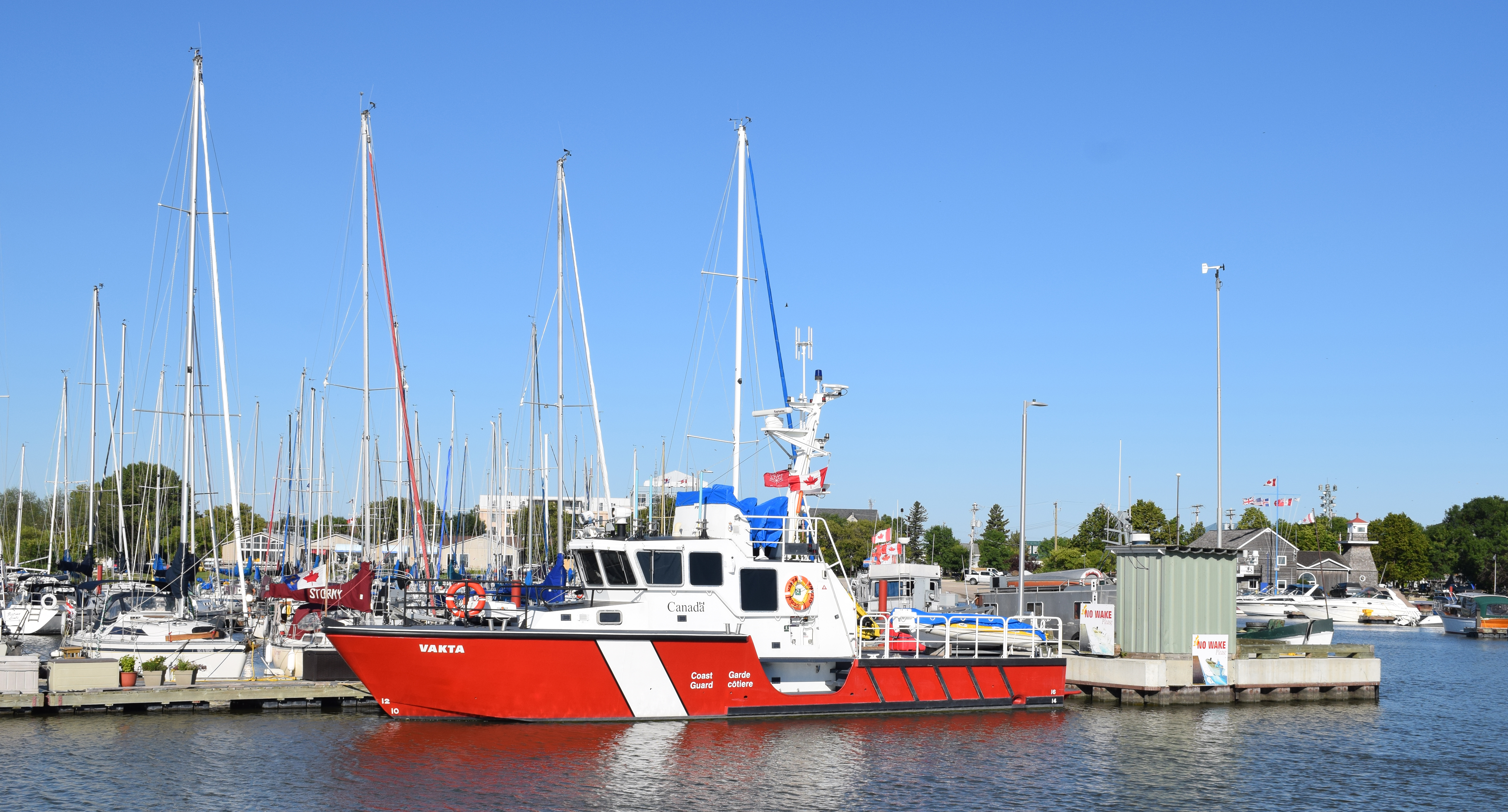
- CCGS Vakta in harbour at Gimli, Manitoba in August 2017.

History

Canada
- Name: Vakta
- Namesake: Old Norse, meaning "To keep watch"
- Operator: Canadian Coast Guard
- Port of registry: Ottawa, Ontario
- Builder: Hike Metal Products Ltd., Wheatley, Ontario
- Launched: 2003
- Commissioned: 2003
- Home port: Gimli, Manitoba
- Identification: Official number: 825542; Callsign: CG8080
- Status: in active service

General characteristics
- Type: Specialty vessel
- Tonnage: 34.4 GT; 25.8 NT
- Length: 16.3 m (53 ft 6 in)
- Beam: 4.6 m (15 ft 1 in)
- Draught: 1.4 m (4 ft 7 in)
- Propulsion: 2 × Caterpillar C12 diesel engines
- Speed: 21 knots (39 km/h)
- Endurance: 3 days
- Complement: 4

CCGS Vakta is a vessel of the Canadian Coast Guard. She was built in Wheatley, Ontario and was named Vakta, which comes from Icelandic meaning to "watch, guard, or patrol". Vakta is the only Canadian Coast Guard vessel on Lake Winnipeg and stationed in Gimli, Manitoba, the largest harbour between Sarnia, Ontario and Vancouver, British Columbia.

== Description ==
Vakta is 16.3 m (53 ft 6 in) long with a beam of 4.6 m (15 ft 1 in) and a draught of 1.4 m (4 ft 7 in). The vessel has a 34.4 gross tonnage (GT) and has 25.8 net tonnage (NT). Vatka's hull is constructed of aluminum and is powered by two Caterpillar C12 diesel engines driving two fixed pitch propellers rated at 731 kilowatts (980 hp) and is also equipped with a Northern Lights M844K generator. The vessel has a maximum speed of 21 knots (39 km/h; 24 mph) and a range of 320 nautical miles (590 km; 370 mi) at a cruising speed of 15 knots (28 km/h; 17 mph). Vatka carries 2.6 m^{3} (92 cu ft) of diesel fuel and capacity for 0.4 m^{3} (14 cu ft) of fresh water with an endurance of three days. The vessel is equipped with one rigid-hulled inflatable boat launched from the stern. The ship has a complement of four Coast Guard personnel.

== Service history ==
Vatka was constructed by Hike Metal Products Ltd. of Wheatley, Ontario and launched in 2003. The vessel was completed and accepted into service as Vatka whose meaning is of Icelandic origin meaning "watch, guard or patrol". The vessel is home ported at the Canadian Coast Guard base in Gimli, Manitoba on Lake Winnipeg. The Coast Guard unit in Gimli is tasked with placing navigational markers on Lake Winnipeg and leading search and rescue missions on the lake.
