= Robert Enright =

Canadian journalist and editor

Robert Enright CM is a Canadian journalist, art critic, and academic. He is the founder and senior contributing editor at Border Crossings.

== Career ==
Enright attended the University of Saskatchewan, in Saskatoon, from 1967 to 1971 as an undergraduate in the Department of English where he received a BA (Hons.). He then attended the Doctoral Program at the University of Manitoba. In 1976, he was one of the founders of literary publisher Turnstone Press. From 1988 to 1992 he was a member of the Board of Directors for the Western Magazine Awards Foundation, as well as a Member of the Canada Council Advisory Panel on Book and Periodical Publishing from 1990 to 1992.

Along with spending 25 years as an art critic for CBC, he has also contributed to ARTnews, Modern Painters, ArtReview, frieze and The Globe & Mail. For his work he received nominations and medals at the National Magazine Awards, and at the Western Magazine Awards. He has contributed introductions, essays, interviews and articles to over 300 art catalogues and books on contemporary artists.

While working for CBC for 25 years he started the magazine Border Crossings with Meeka Walsh and has this to say on the topic: "I've always been a border crosser, and the magazine was based on the premise that artists never looked at only one thing."

In 2005 he was named a Member of the Order of Canada, in 2012 he was awarded the Queen Elizabeth II Diamond Jubilee Medal, and in 2015 he was awarded a Doctorate of Letters from the University of Winnipeg. He is the Research Professor in Art Theory and Criticism in the School of Fine Art and Music at the University of Guelph.
