= Jack Carr =

Jack or Jackie Carr may refer to:

== Sports ==
- Jack Carr (billiards player) (fl. 1815–1825), English billiards player
- Jack Carr (footballer, born 1878) (1878–1948), English footballer for Newcastle United and England
- Jackie Carr (footballer, born 1892) (1892–1942), English footballer for Middlesbrough, Blackpool, Hartlepool United, and England
- Jack Carr (Australian footballer) (1913–1997), Australian footballer for Melbourne
- Jackie Carr (footballer, born 1924) (1924–1990), Scottish footballer for Gillingham
- Jackie Carr (footballer, born 1926) (1926–1996), South African-born footballer for Huddersfield Town
- Jack Carr (racing driver), former NASCAR Grand National driver in the 1950 Southern 500

== Others ==
- Jack Carr (animator) (1906–1967), American animator and voice actor
- Jack Carr (politician) (born 1975), politician in the province of New Brunswick, Canada
- Jack Carr (writer), American author

== See also ==
- John Carr (disambiguation)
