= Di Brandt =

Canadian poet and scholar (born 1952)

- Born: Diana Janzen; 31 January 1952 (age 74); Winkler, Manitoba, Canada
- Occupation: Poet
- Awards: McNally Robinson Book of the Year Award; 1990 Agnes in the sky Canadian Authors Association Award for Poetry; 1996 Jerusalem, beloved

Academic background
- Education: Canadian Mennonite Bible College (BTh); University of Toronto (MA); University of Manitoba (BA, PhD)
- Thesis: Wild mother dancing : maternal narrative in contemporary writing by women in Canada and Quebec (1993)

Di Brandt (née Janzen; 31 January 1952) often stylized as di brandt, is a Canadian poet and scholar from Winnipeg, Manitoba. She became Winnipeg's first Poet Laureate in 2018.

== Life and career ==
Brandt grew up in Reinland, a Mennonite farming village in southern Manitoba near Winkler. Brandt earned a Bachelor of Theology from the Canadian Mennonite Bible College in 1972. In 1975, she earned a Bachelor of Arts at the University of Manitoba before going on to earn a Master of Arts from the University of Toronto in 1976. She earned her PhD in Canadian literature from the University of Manitoba in 1993. Her first volume of poetry questions i asked my mother was published by Turnstone Press in 1987. Since then she has published seven more volumes of poetry, as well as literary criticism. She has taught Canadian literature and creative writing. She also served as Manitoba and Prairie Rep at the League of Canadian Poets National Council and the Writers' Union of Canada National Council. In 2018, she became the first Poet Laureate of Winnipeg, a position she held through 2019, and was awarded an Honorary Doctorate by MacEwan University in 2021.

== Editorial work ==
Brandt was fiction editor of Herizons (1985–1986), co-editor of Contemporary Verse 2 (1985–1988), and poetry editor of Prairie Fire (1989–1993). She also helped establish the feminist editorial collective at Contemporary Verse 2.

With Barbara Godard, she co-edited Re:Generations: Canadian Women Poets in Conversation (2005), combining poetry, conversations, essays, art and music, and Wider Boundaries of Daring: The Modernist Impulse in Canadian Women's Poetry (2009), examining women's contributions to Canadian literary modernism.

== Bibliography ==
Poetry:

- questions i asked my mother (Winnipeg: Turnstone Press, 1987)
- Agnes in the sky (Winnipeg: Turnstone Press, 1990)
- mother, not mother (Toronto: The Mercury Press, 1992)
- Jerusalem, beloved (Winnipeg: Turnstone Press, 1995)
- Now You Care (Toronto: Coach House Press, 2003)
- The Lottery of History (Brandon, MB: Radish Press, 2008). Chapbook.
- Walking to Mojacar, with French and Spanish translations by Charles Leblanc and Ari Belathar (Winnipeg: Turnstone Press, 2010)
- SHE: Poems inspired by Laozi, with ink drawings by Lin Xu (Brandon, MB: Radish Press, 2012). Chapbook.
- The Sweetest Dance on Earth: New and Selected Poems (Winnipeg: Turnstone Press, 2022)

Essays:

- Wild Mother Dancing: Maternal Narrative in Canadian Literature (Winnipeg, MB: University of Manitoba Press 1993).
- Dancing Naked: Narrative Strategies for Writing Across Centuries (Toronto: Mercury Press 1996).
- Re:Generations: Canadian Women Poets in Conversation (Windsor, ON: Black Moss Press 2006), ed. with Barbara Godard.
- So this is the world & here I am in it (Edmonton: NeWest Press 2007).
- Wider Boundaries of Daring: The Modernist Impulse in Canadian Women's Poetry (Waterloo, ON: Wilfrid Laurier University Press 2011), ed. with Barbara Godard.

Collaborations:

- Awakenings: In Four Voices, a collaborative poetry/music audio recording (CD) with Dorothy Livesay (posthumously), Carol Ann Weaver and Rebecca Campbell (2003).
- Emily, The Way you Are, a one-woman chamber opera about the life and work of Emily Carr, with musical score by Jana Skarecky, premiered at the McMichael Gallery in Kleinburg, ON, in 2011, featuring mezzo-soprano Ramona Carmelly and the Talisker Players directed by Gary Kulesha.
- Watermelon Syrup: A Novel with Annie Jacobsen and Jane Finlay-Young (WLUP 2011).
- Coyotes do not carry her away, a musical setting of Di Brandt's poems, by Manitoba composer Kenneth Nichols, commissioned by the Brandon Chamber Society and premiered at Brandon City Hall in 2012, featuring Naomi Forman (soprano), Catherine Wood (clarinet) and Ann Germani (harp).

== Awards and recognition ==
=== Literary awards ===
- Gerald Lampert Award for questions i asked my mother.
- McNally Robinson Manitoba Book of the Year Award for Agnes in the sky.
- CAA National Poetry Prize for Jerusalem, beloved.
- Foreword Gold Medal for Fiction for Watermelon Syrup.
- Gabrielle Roy Prize for Wider Boundaries of Daring: The Modernist Impulse in Canadian Women's Poetry, shared with co-editor Barbara Godard.

=== Nominations and shortlistings ===
- questions i asked my mother: nominated for the Governor General's Award for Poetry.
- mother, not mother: nominated for the Pat Lowther Award.
- Wild Mother Dancing: Maternal Narrative in Canadian Literature: nominated for the McNally Robinson Manitoba Book of the Year Award.
- Jerusalem, beloved: nominated for the Governor General's Award for Poetry and the Pat Lowther Award.
- Now You Care: shortlisted for the Griffin Poetry Prize in 2004; also nominated for the Pat Lowther Award.
- So this is the world & here I am in it: nominated for the McNally Robinson Manitoba Book of the Year Award.
- Walking to Mojacar, with French and Spanish translations by Charles Leblanc and Ari Belathar: nominated for the McNally Robinson Manitoba Book of the Year Award.

=== University honours ===
- 2006: Research Excellence Award from the University of Windsor.
- 2009: Gold Medal for Exceptional Service from Brandon University.
- 2011: President's Medal for Research, Teaching and Service from Brandon University.

=== Research appointments and fellowships ===
- 1996–1998: Research fellowship funded by the Social Sciences and Humanities Research Council at the University of Alberta.
- 1999: Research fellowship at Hawthornden Castle, Scotland.
- 2001: Research fellowship at Château de Lavigny, Switzerland.
- 2004: Research fellowship at Ledig House, New York.
- 2005–2011: Canada Research Chair in Literature and Creative Writing at Brandon University.
- 2006: Research fellowship at Fundación Valparaíso, Spain.

== See also ==
- Canadian literature
- Canadian poetry
- List of Canadian poets
