= The Namao =

Canadian research vessel on Lake Winnipeg

The Namao is a ship ported in Gimli, Manitoba, Canada, whose purpose is to conduct research on Lake Winnipeg. It was originally built for the Canadian Coast Guard (CCG) but was eventually sold to the Lake Winnipeg Research Consortium (LWRC) who converted it to a Lake Winnipeg research vessel. Scientists using the Namao to research the environmental issues concerning the lake, for example the increasing eutrophication of the lake and the impact of invasive species. Using the Namao, the LWRC integrates education and community outreach into their work to promote sustainable living and development focussed on the youth in local communities surrounding Lake Winnipeg who are affected most by the changing dynamics of the lake.

== Design ==
The ship was originally designed for the CCG. It is a small research vessel with a length of 33.62 meters (110.3 ft), a breadth of 8.53 meters (28.0 ft) and a weight of nearly 328 tonnes (723,000 lb). It requires nine people to crew the ship and can accommodate 15 people comfortably. It is the largest ship in the Gimli harbour, its current home port.

== History ==
In 1975 the CCGS (Canadian Coast Guard Ship) Namao was made to serve as a Class 900 buoy tender for the Canadian Coast Guard. Built in Riverton, Manitoba, it has strong ties to Lake Winnipeg. The Namao was stationed in Selkirk and was used to deploy and recover buoys and occasionally to assist vessels in distress. Between 1994 and 1996, the Namao was used for research on the geological history of Lake Winnipeg by the Geological Survey of Canada. This was the first time the Namao was used for research.

In 1997, the Namao was owned by the Aids to Navigation Program; this was privatized and the Namao was sent for disposal through Crown Assets. Around the same time the Lake Winnipeg Research Consortium (LWRC) was formed to coordinate scientific research on Lake Winnipeg. They requested the use of the Namao for research purposes and were successful in attaining it in 1999. The base for the Namao was moved to Gimli and the ship changed from a CCGS to a Lake Winnipeg research vessel.

== Funding ==
The Namao is funded by the Lake Winnipeg Research Consortium with help from the Government of Manitoba. Since the province began funding the Namao in 2003 they have invested $1.25 million toward the operation of the Namao. In the Sustainable Development Annual Report, the Government of Manitoba recognizes the role of scientific research in restoring the health of Lake Winnipeg and how this contributes to sustainable development of communities who rely on the lake as part of their economy and well-being.

== Environmental research ==
In the past few decades the health of Lake Winnipeg has deteriorated at an alarming rate. In 2013 it was named “the world’s most threatened lake” by the Global Nature Fund. The Namao, as the official research vessel of Lake Winnipeg, helps scientists examine the physical, biological, ecological, and chemical structure of the lake, and the processes that are critical to its well-being.

=== Eutrophication ===
Since eutrophication is one of the biggest environmental concerns facing Lake Winnipeg, it is researched on the Namao. Scientists aboard the Namao were able to deduce that the significant cause of the eutrophication of the lake is the runoff of phosphorus. They also learned that contrary to previous assumptions, most of the nutrient loading into the lake was coming from the Red River Basin. Phosphorus abatement efforts and other sustainable development projects aimed at mitigating runoff of phosphorus can be better applied. The Namao also allows scientists to provide progress reports on the health of the lake and assess how various restoration and management strategies are working once implemented. The Namao scientists were able to test the huge algal blooms caused by eutrophication and assess how dangerous they may be to human and other organism health.

=== Zebra mussels ===
The scientists aboard the Namao monitored the presence of zebra mussels as they became established, studied the environmental impacts of zebra mussels in the lake including the decline of native mussel populations, researched how they became introduced, and helped create and conduct control operations.

== Education and outreach ==
The Namao also provides education and outreach programs to youth in communities surrounding Lake Winnipeg. The Namao offers a lake ecology field program twice a year to students between grades 6 and 12. Students on excursions in the south basin of the lake sample and analyze aspects of the lake ecosystem including the water, algae, micro-organisms and the contents of the lake floor.

== Sources ==
Ansari, A. & Gill, S. (2014). Eutrophication: Causes, consequences and control. SpringeLink Publishing.

Casey, A. (2006). Forgotten Lake, 64–78. Winnipeg, MB: Canada Geographic.

Environment and Climate Change Canada (2016). Nutrients in lake Winnipeg. Gatineau, QC: Environment and Climate Change Canada

Gingera, T., Bajno, R., Docker, M., & Reist, J. (2017). Environmental dna as a detection tool for zebra mussels dreissena polymorpha at the forefront of an invasion event in lake Winnipeg, Manitoba, Canada. Management of Biological Invasions, 8(3), 287–300. doi:10.3391/mbi.2017.8.3.03

Government of Manitoba (2017). Manitoba Sustainable Development Annual Report. Winnipeg, MB: Government of Manitoba

Government of Manitoba (2011). State of lake Winnipeg. Winnipeg, MB: Government of Manitoba

Kristofferson, A. & Scott, K. (2018). About the namao. Lake Winnipeg Research Consortium.

http://www.lakewinnipegresearch.org/contact.html

Lake Winnipeg Stewardship Board (2005). Our collective responsibility: Reducing nutrient loading to lake Winnipeg: An interim report to the minister of water stewardship for Manitoba. Gimli, MB: Lake Winnipeg Stewardship Board.

Macissac, H. (1996). Potential abiotic and biotic impacts of zebra mussels on the inland waters of North America. Integrative and Comparative Biology, 36(3), 287–299

Schindler, D., Hecky, R., McCullough, G. (2013). The rapid eutrophication of lake Winnipeg: Greening under global change. Journal of Great Lakes Research. 3(38), 6-13

Voora, V., Venema, H., & Canada. Environment Canada. Policy Development Division (2008). An ecosystem services assessment of the lake Winnipeg watershed. Winnipeg, MB: International Institute for Sustainable Development
