= Robert Kroetsch =

Canadian novelist, poet and nonfiction writer (1927 – 2011)

Robert Kroetsch OC FRSC
- Born: Robert Paul Kroetsch; June 26, 1927; Heisler, Alberta, Canada
- Died: June 21, 2011 (aged 83)
- Education: University of Alberta (BA, 1948)
- Occupations: Novelist, poet, nonfiction writer, academic
- Writing career
- Notable works: The Studhorse Man (1969); Seed Catalogue (1977)
- Notable awards: Governor General's Award for Fiction (1969); Lieutenant Governor of Alberta Distinguished Artist Award (2011)
- Movement: Postmodernism

Robert Paul Kroetsch OC (June 26, 1927 – June 21, 2011) was a Canadian novelist, poet and nonfiction writer. In his fiction and critical essays, as well as in the journal he co-founded, boundary 2, he was an influential figure in Canada in introducing ideas about postmodernism.

== Early life and education ==
Robert Paul Kroetsch was born on June 26, 1927, to Paul and Hilda Kroetsch. He was their only son and had four sisters: Kay McGill, Pat Youngberg, Jane Vigano, and Sheila Mederios.

Kroetsch was born and raised on a farm in Heisler, Alberta. He recalled he "loved listening in on adult conversations. In a rural area there was a great oral tradition of tall tales, gossip, that kind of continuous flow of language that came to fascinate me."

He earned a Bachelor of Arts degree from the University of Alberta in 1948.

== Career ==
=== Academic career ===
Kroetsch began his academic career at Binghamton University (State University of New York); after returning to Canada in the mid-1970s he taught at the University of Manitoba in Winnipeg.

=== Writing career ===
Kroetsch's 1969 novel The Studhorse Man won the 1969 Governor General's Award for Fiction, while he was also nominated for the Governor General's Award for Poetry for his volume The Hornbooks of Rita K. Kroetsch is well known for his influential 1977 long poem Seed Catalogue, published by Turnstone Press, "which is to Albertans what Walt Whitman's Leaves of Grass is to Americans."

Kroetsch published his first poem in Canadian Literature in 1981 and continued to contribute poetry to the journal over the next two decades. He also published the article "The Grammar of Silence: Narrative Patterns in Ethnic Writing" in 1985 and a note on Dorothy Livesay in 1997. In 2009, he worked with Matthew Gruman on his entry for the journal's CanLit Poets website.

== Later years and death ==
Kroetsch spent several years in Victoria, British Columbia, before returning to Winnipeg, then to retirement in Alberta, where he continued to write. In 2004 he was made an Officer of the Order of Canada.

Kroetsch died on June 21, 2011 in an automobile accident returning home from a literary festival in 2011. He was 83. Kroetsch was survived by two daughters and three sisters.

== Awards and honours ==
=== Literary awards ===
- 1969 – Governor General's Award for Fiction for The Studhorse Man.
- 1985 – Silver Award for Poetry at the National Magazine Awards for "Delphi: A Commentary".

=== Nominations and finalist placements ===
- 1993 – Nominated for the McNally Robinson Award for Manitoba Book of the Year for The Puppeteer.
- 1993 – Finalist for the Commonwealth Writers' Prize for Best Book in the Canada and Caribbean region for The Puppeteer.
- 2001 – Nominated for the Governor General's Award for Poetry for The Hornbooks of Rita K.

=== Honours and honorary degrees ===
- 1983 – Honorary Doctor of Laws, University of Winnipeg.
- 1986 – Fellow of the Royal Society of Canada.
- 1995 – Distinguished Achievement Award from the Western Literature Association, the first Canadian to receive the award.
- 1997 – Honorary Doctor of Letters, University of Alberta.
- 2003 – Distinguished Alumni Award from the University of Alberta Alumni Association.
- 2004 – Officer of the Order of Canada.
- 2011 – Lieutenant Governor of Alberta Distinguished Artist Award.

=== Fellowships and appointments ===
- 1959–1961 – University Fellowship, University of Iowa.
- 1966 – Fellow at the Bread Loaf Writers' Conference in Bread Loaf, Vermont, in August.
- 1985 – Distinguished Professorship, University of Manitoba.
- 1986–1988 – Killam Award.
- 2002 – Distinguished Visiting Writer in the Markin-Flanagan Distinguished Writers Program, Faculty of Humanities, University of Calgary, from January 9 to April 10.

=== Symposia in his honour ===
- 1994 – "The Robert Kroetsch Symposium", Université des Sciences Humaines de Strasbourg, held in Niederbronn-les-Bains, France, from May 9 to 12.
- 1997 – "A Likely Story: The Writing of Robert Kroetsch", St. Jerome's College, University of Waterloo, June 12 to 14.

== Works ==
=== Novels ===
- But We Are Exiles (1965).
- The Words of My Roaring (1966).
- The Studhorse Man (1969).
- Gone Indian (1973).
- Badlands (1975).
- What the Crow Said (1978).
- Alibi (1983).
- The Puppeteer (1992)
- The Man from the Creeks (1998).
  - German edition, Klondike: Die Ballade von Lou und Dangerous Dan McGrew (Schneekluth, Munich, 1999).

=== Poetry ===
- The Ledger (1975).
- The Stone Hammer Poems (1975).
- Seed Catalogue (1977), published by Turnstone Press.
- The Sad Phoenician (1979).
- The Criminal Intensities of Love as Paradise (1981).
- Field Notes: Collected Poems (1981).
- Advice to My Friends (1985).
- "Delphi: A Commentary".
- Excerpts from the Real Worlds: A Prose Poem in Ten Parts (1986).
- Completed Field Notes: The Long Poems of Robert Kroetsch (1989).
- The Hornbooks of Rita K (2001).
- The Snowbird Poems (2004).
- Too Bad: Sketches Toward a Self-Portrait (2010).
- I'm Getting Old Now (date unknown).

=== Nonfiction ===
- Alberta (1968).
- The Crow Journals (1980).
- Labyrinths of Voice: Conversations with Robert Kroetsch (1982).
- Letter to Salonika (1983).
- The Lovely Treachery of Words: Essays Selected and New (1989).
- A Likely Story: The Writing Life (1995).
- Abundance: The Mackie House Conversations about the Writing Life (2007, with John Lent).

=== Articles and notes ===
- "The Grammar of Silence: Narrative Patterns in Ethnic Writing" (1985), Canadian Literature.
- "Dorothy Livesay, 1909–1996" (1997), Canadian Literature.

== See also ==
- Canadian literature
- Canadian poetry
- List of Canadian poets
