= Barbara Godard =

Canadian critic, translator, editor, and academic

- Born: 1942; Toronto, Ontario, Canada
- Died: 16 May 2010 (aged 67–68); Toronto, Ontario, Canada
- Education: Université de Bordeaux (Ph.D.)
- Occupations: Professor, translator, critic
- Notable work: Canadian Literature at the Crossroads of Language and Culture (2008); Translation, Semiotics, and Feminism: Selected Writings of Barbara Godard (2022)

Barbara Godard (1942 – May 16, 2010) was a Canadian critic, translator, editor, and academic. She held the Avie Bennett Historica Chair of Canadian Literature and was Professor of English, French, Social and Political Thought and Women's Studies at York University. She published widely on Canadian and Quebec cultures, on feminist and literary theory, and on translation studies. Barbara Godard died in Toronto on May 16, 2010. Across Canada and throughout the world, poets, scholars, feminists, and friends mourned her death.

== Translator ==
As a translator, she has introduced Quebec women writers Louky Bersianik, Yolande Villemaire and Antonine Maillet to an English audience. Her translations include Nicole Brossard's Picture Theory (1991) and France Theoret's The Tangible Word (1991). In 2004 her translation of Brossard's Intimate Journal was published as well as a revised edition of Maillet's The Tale of Don l'Orignal, also available as an audiobook as broadcast on CBC's Between the Covers. She is author of Talking About Ourselves: the Cultural Productions of Canadian Native Women (1985) and Audrey Thomas: Her Life and Work (1989) and has edited Gynocritics/Gynocritiques: Feminist Approaches to the Writing of Canadian and Quebec Women (1987), Collaboration in the Feminine: Writings on Women and Culture from Tessera (1994), and Intersexions: Issues of Race and Gender in Canadian Women's Writing (1996). Translation, Semiotics, and Feminism: Selected Writings of Barbara Godard appeared in 2022 in the Key Thinkers on Translation series (Routledge).

== Editor ==
A founding co-editor of the feminist literary theory periodical, Tessera, Barbara Godard was contributing editor of Open Letter and The Semiotic Review of Books and book review editor of Topia: A Canadian Journal of Cultural Studies. In 1998 she held the Gerstein Award for an advanced research seminar on Translation Studies in Canada: Institutions, Discourses, Texts. In 2001, with Di Brandt she organized the conference "'Wider Boundaries of Daring': The Modernist Impulse in Canadian Women's Poetry" whose proceedings are currently being edited for publication. A first volume, ReGenerations: Canadian Women Poets in Conversation, appeared in 2006.

== Prizes ==
She is the recipient of the Gabrielle Roy Prize of the Association for Canadian and Quebec Literatures (1988), the Award of Merit of the Association of Canadian Studies (1995), the Vinay-Darbelnet Prize of the Canadian Association of Translation Studies (2000) and the Teaching Award of the Faculty of Graduate Studies, York University (2002) and of the Northeast Association of Graduate Schools (2002). In 2010, she was made a Fellow of the Royal Society of Canada.
