= B. J. Phillips =

B. J. Phillips was an associate editor at Time magazine. She contributed to coverage of the Pentagon Papers.

== Life ==
She attended the University of Georgia in the 1960s.

It has been erroneously reported that she graduated from Kenyon College. On Thursday, November 28, 1996, The Philadelphia Inquirer printed the wrong photo and byline of its Business Section columnist of the day in some editions. Jeff Brown's column normally appeared on Sundays, Tuesdays, and Thursdays, while Phillips' column normally appeared on Wednesdays and Fridays. Instead of Brown's photo and byline, those of Phillips ran in at least the edition delivered to suburban Delaware County, PA, while Brown's photo and byline ran properly in at least the edition delivered to suburban Montgomery County, PA. In that day's column, Brown wrote a quote about being a graduate of Kenyon that was picked up by the Collegiate Choice Walking Tours web site. However, whoever reported on it must have seen an edition with the Phillips photo and byline, and thus the quote was attributed to her. Indeed, Jeff Brown's own web site notes that he is a Kenyon graduate.

Margaret Carlson worked with her at Time. She was at the 7th University of North Dakota Writers Conference, "New Journalism and the Novel", in 1976.

She wrote for the Style section of The Washington Post, the London bureau of Institutional Investor, the Atlanta Constitution (where she worked with Jack Nelson), and the Philadelphia Inquirer. She had a conflict with her editor, about a column about Advanta, and she moved from being a columnist in the business section to a becoming an investigative reporter.

She was on a panel, "Why are Economic Activities Continuing to Move Out of the City?" at the University of Pennsylvania.

== Works ==
- "Olympics: You Will See Me Again...", Time, August 11, 1980

== Anthologies ==
- Joseph R. DesJardins; John J. McCall (1996). "The Addiction of the Layoff". Contemporary issues in business ethics. Wadsworth Pub. Co. ISBN 978-0-534-25542-8.
