= Selo Black Crow =

Personal details
- Born: July 23, 1932
- Died: March 5, 2004 (aged 71) Denver, Colorado, U.S.
- Citizenship: United States; Oglala Lakota Nation
- Occupation: Rodeo rider, Native American rights activist
- Military career
- Allegiance: United States
- Branch: Army
- Conflicts: Korean War

Sylvester "Selo" Black Crow (July 23, 1932 – March 5, 2004) was an Oglala Lakota leader and activist.

== Life ==
He served in the United States Army as a paratrooper and pathfinder during the Korean War.

In 1968, Black Crow, along with Leonard Crow Dog and six other men, brought the Sun Dance back to the Lakota People.

He traveled to Washington, D.C. to meet with President Gerald Ford to gain approval for the American Indian Religious Freedom Act in 1978. In 1980, he attended a storytelling conference at University of North Dakota.

He sued over religious practices at Bear Butte. In January, 2000, he was one of the Traditional Elders, who occupied the Tribal Council Building on the Pine Ridge Indian Reservation.

A transitional house in Minnesota is named for him.
