= Lois Phillips Hudson =

American novelist

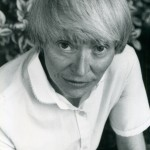
- Born: August 24, 1927; Jamestown, North Dakota, U.S.
- Died: December 24, 2010 (aged 83); Redmond, Washington, U.S.
- Occupations: Novelist; Professor of English Literature
- Children: 2

Lois Phillips Hudson (August 24, 1927 – December 24, 2010) was an American academic, editor, and novelist.

Born to Carl Wayne Phillips and Aline (née Runner) Phillips; she was the eldest of three daughters born to the couple. Aline Runner was a teacher with a degree in chemistry, but left the field to become a farm wife when she married Carl, who was a largely self-educated man. The Phillips family lived and farmed outside Cleveland, North Dakota until, ruined by the Great Depression and the Dust Bowl, they were forced to migrate to Washington State in 1935. On their journey, they spent several months as migrant workers moving from location to location, following the crops' picking seasons for available work. During this time, the sisters' education was not taken seriously by the schools in which they were placed, as was depicted in the short story Children of the Harvest. Upon arriving in Seattle, they found a small house in the Ballard neighborhood, where Carl operated a gas station. Ultimately, the family bought the farm of a man who was unable to pay his taxes. The farm was located on the East Side of Lake Washington, outside Redmond.

Lois Phillips became the first editor of the Redmond Recorder as an 18-year-old in the 1940s. She went on to graduate from the College (now University) of Puget Sound in Tacoma, where she edited the yearbook. After spending a year teaching junior high school English in Shelton, Washington, she had saved enough money to enter the master's degree program at Cornell University in Ithaca, New York. Her lack of funds necessitated her completing the degree in one year. She married Randolph Hudson, a fellow Cornell graduate student in English, in 1952, and the couple moved to California, where their two daughters, Laura and Lucy, were born. She was granted an honorary doctorate by North Dakota State University in 1965; Lawrence Welk also received an honorary doctorate from NDSU at the same ceremony. At the time, he traded Hudson an autographed album in exchange for an autographed copy of The Bones of Plenty. Lois Phillips Hudson, as she would become known, subsequently taught at both North Dakota State University and the University of Washington, retiring from the latter in 1992.

A prolific writer, her best known works are her novel, The Bones of Plenty, and the collection of short stories, Reapers of the Dust: A Prairie Chronicle. Both chronicled the years of the Great Depression in the American agricultural heartland. Although both books appear to be highly autobiographical, Hudson often reminded people that they were in fact works of fiction. Other works include two manuscripts unpublished at the time of Hudson's death. The first of these is partly memoir and partly a history of the Redmond, Washington area, Unrestorable Habitat: Microsoft Is My Neighbor Now. It was published in a generally unedited form in March 2014 by Foreverland Press. The second work, a novel about the early history of California, The Kindly Fruits of the Earth, is currently under review for possible publication. Additionally, Hudson published a multitude of short stories in a number of publications both nationally (Harper's, The New Yorker, The Reporter) and regionally/locally in Washington (Puget Soundings, a magazine published by the Junior League of Seattle).

Hudson was an active environmentalist, who, in addition to publishing many articles on the subject, performed service as a salmon watcher on the Sammamish River. She also wrote extensively on the changes that took place in her chosen home city of Redmond over a 65-year period; a topic she was invited to speak about to the Redmond Historical Society.

== Life ==
- 1927, August 24, born Jamestown, North Dakota to Carl and Aline Runner Phillips; the eldest of three girls.
- 1935, Phillips' family migrates from North Dakota to Washington.
- 1945, first editor of the Redmond Recorder at age 18.
- 1949, B.A., University of Puget Sound.
- 1951-53 taught high school, Ithaca, New York.
- 1952, married Randolph Hudson.
- 1954, moved to Menlo Park, California; Randolph entered PHD program in English at Stanford.
- 1955, birth of daughter Laura.
- 1956, birth of daughter Lucy, for whom the character of Lucy in The Bones of Plenty is named.
- 1957, published first short story.
- 1957, published Reapers of the Dust, A Prairie Chronicle (collection of short stories).
- 1958, moved to Arcata, California; Randolph teaching at Humboldt State.
- 1962, moved to Boulder, Colorado; Randolph teaching at Colorado University.
- 1962, published The Bones of Plenty (novel).
- 1962, recipient of the Friends of American Writers award.
- 1965, received honorary doctorate from North Dakota State University (NDSU).
- 1967, divorced, moved to Fargo, North Dakota.
- 1967-69, assistant professor of English at NDSU.
- 1969-75, assistant professor of English, University of Washington.
- 1975-92, associate professor of English, University of Washington.

== Death ==
Lois Hudson died on December 24, 2010, aged 83, after a battle with pancreatic cancer.

== Awards ==
- Friends of American Writers First Prize

== Works ==
Books

- Reapers of the Dust: A Prairie Chronicle. Little, Brown and Co. 1957. ISBN 978-0-87351-177-3. (reprint Minnesota Historical Society Press, 1984, ISBN 978-0-87351-177-3)
- The Bones of Plenty. Little, Brown. 1962. ISBN 978-0-87351-175-9. (reprint Minnesota Historical Society Press, 1984, ISBN 978-0-87351-175-9)
- Unrestorable Habitat: Microsoft Is My Neighbor Now. Foreverland Press, 2014.

Short Stories

- The King's Birthday, published in The Reporter, December 24, 1959.
- Gopher Hunting, published in The Reporter, August 4, 1960.
- Green Hay, published in The Reporter, July 5, 1962.
- Where the Fields are Fresh and Green, published in The Reporter, January 16, 1964.

Other

- The Dust Storm, published in The Reporter, April 4, 1957.
- The Cold Wave, published in The Reporter, February 6, 1958.
- Children of the Harvest, published in The Reporter, October 16, 1958.
- The Water Witch, published in The Reporter, July 23, 1959.
- Work for the Night is Coming, published in The Reporter, January 17, 1963.
- Epitaph for a Lion, published in the Teacher Edition of Literary Cavalcade, February, 1963.
- Springtime in the Rockies, published in The Reporter, February 11, 1965.
- Four-Lane Menace To California's Redwoods, published in The Reporter, August 12, 1965.

== Criticism ==
- "Review: Big Rock Candy Mountain, Wallace Stegner" South Dakota Review 9 (Spring 1971), p. 3-13.
