= Meeka Walsh =

Canadian writer, art critic, and curator

Meeka Walsh is a Canadian writer, art critic, and curator. She is the editor of Border Crossings.

An author of short stories and essays, Walsh was included in the Oxford Anthology of Canadian Women Writers. She was from 2002 to 2005 a trustee of the National Gallery of Canada.

Walsh was awarded a gold medal by the Royal Canadian Academy of Arts in 2007. She was appointed to the Order of Canada in 2017.
