= David Arnason =

Canadian author and poet (1940–2026)

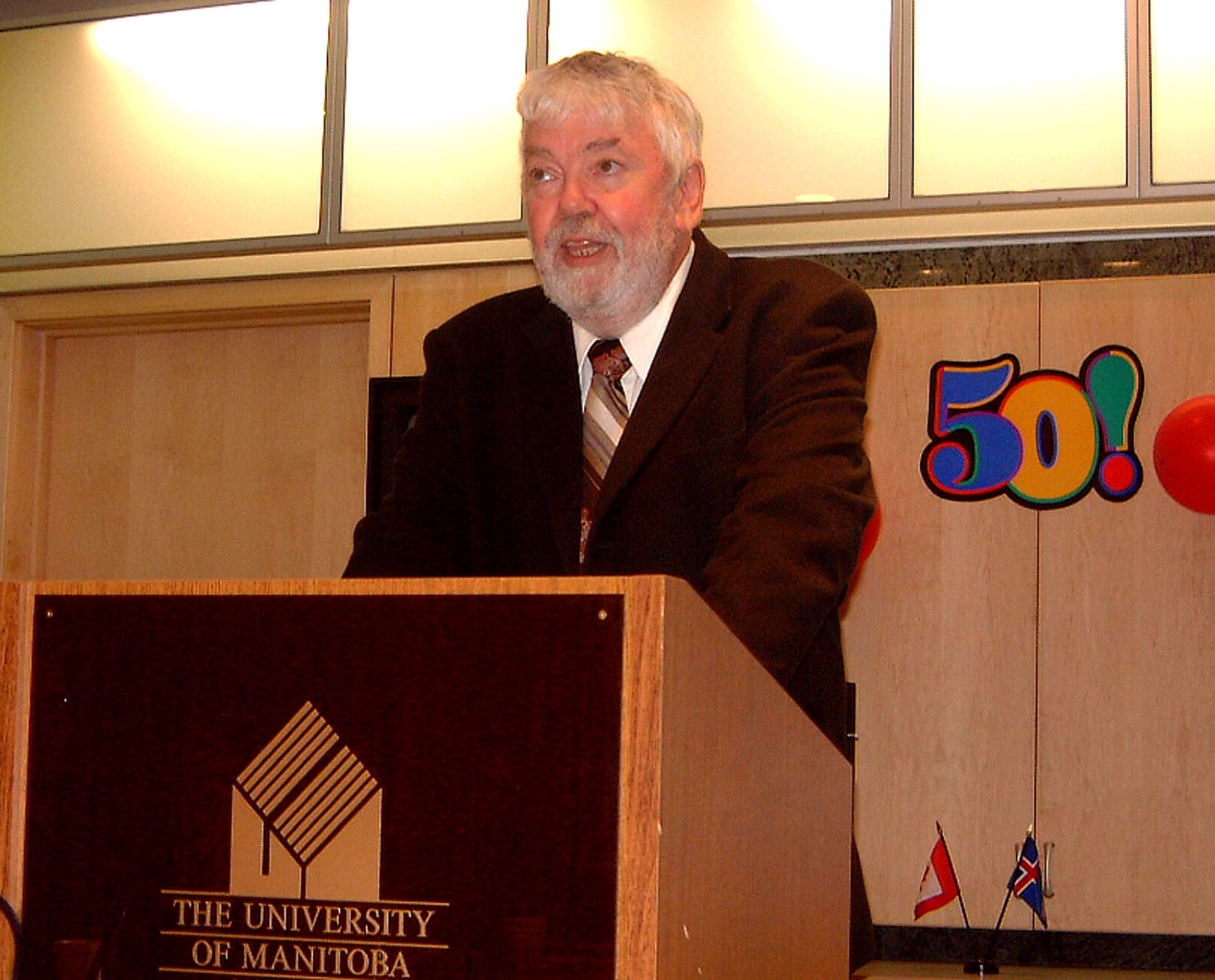
- Arnason in 2001
- Born: 23 May 1940; Gimli, Manitoba, Canada
- Died: 14 September 2026 (aged 86); Gimli, Manitoba, Canada
- Education: University of Manitoba (B.A.), (M.A.); University of New Brunswick (PhD)
- Occupations: Author; poet; academic; editor
- Years active: 1970s–2026

David Arnason (23 May 1940 – 14 September 2026) was a Canadian author and poet of Icelandic heritage from Winnipeg, Manitoba.

== Life and career ==
Born in Gimli, Manitoba, Arnason was of Icelandic descent and often wrote about the Icelandic community in Canada. He was the son of Baldwin and Gudrun Arnason and the eldest of seven children. Arnason attended the University of Manitoba where he received a B.A. (1961), a Certificate in Education (1963) and M.A. (1969), and had a PhD from the University of New Brunswick (1983–1984). Arnason co-founded the Journal of Canadian Fiction with John Moss at the University of New Brunswick in 1972.

Arnason was one of the co-founders of Queenston House Press in Winnipeg and was an editor of Turnstone Press in Winnipeg from 1975. He was chairman of the Literary Press Group and a member of the executive of the Association of Canadian Publishers. He served on the Manitoba Arts Council from 1985 until 1987. He was a general editor of the Macmillan Themes in Canadian Literature series. He was also a member of the advisory board of Anansi Press. He began working for the CBC in the early 1970s; he reviewed books and theatre, and also created various radio adaptations. He wrote short stories, poetry, and novels, fiction and non-fiction. He edited Dorothy Livesay's Right Hand, Left Hand.

He taught at the University of Manitoba from 1973 and was the head of the English, Theatre, Film and Media Department from 1997 to 2006. He was Acting Head of the Department of Icelandic Language and Literature at the University of Manitoba from 1998 to 2006. As of 2018, he was a full professor at the University of Manitoba and chair of both the Icelandic and the English departments. The University of Manitoba Archives and Special Collections hold the David Arnason Fonds, which includes manuscripts and correspondence.

Arnason died on 14 September 2026 in Gimli, Manitoba, at the age of 86.

== Works ==
- 1980: Marsh Burning
- 1981: The Icelanders
- 1982: Fifty Stories and a Piece of Advice
- 1984: The Circus Performers' Bar
- 1987: Skrag
- 1989: The Happiest Man in the World and Other Stories
- 1992: The Pagan Wall
- 1994: The Dragon and the Dry Goods Princess
- 1994: The New Icelanders: A North American Community
- 1995: If Pigs Could Fly
- 2001: King Jerry
- 2002: The Demon Lover
- 2005: The Imagined City: A Literary History of Winnipeg Edited by David Arnason and Mhari Mackintosh, ISBN 978-0-88801-298-2 – The Imagined City won both The Carol Shields Winnipeg Book Award and The Mary Scorer Book Award for best book by a Manitoba publisher in 2005.
- 2010: Baldur's Song: A Saga

== See also ==
- Canadian literature
- Canadian poetry
- List of Canadian poets
