= John C. Carr (editor) =

- Born: November 18, 1929
- Died: December 19, 1999 (aged 70)
- Occupations: Editor; professor

John C. Carr (November 18, 1929 – December 19, 1999) was an American editor, and Professor Emeritus at the University of Maryland.

== Life ==
From 1965 to 1994, Carr was Adjunct Professor in the Drama Department at the Catholic University of America. He was an arts advocate associated with The John F. Kennedy Center for the Performing Arts.

== Awards ==
- 1981 - 1982 Distinguished Scholar-Teacher Award

== Works ==
- John Carr, ed. (1972). Kite-Flying and Other Irrational Acts: Conversations with Twelve Southern Writers. LSU Press. ISBN 978-0-8071-2523-6.
- Education in the world today. Editors Jean Dresden Grambs, John C. Carr, E. G. Campbell, 1972
- William Kuhns; John C. Carr (1973). Teaching in the dark: resource guide for Movies in America. Pflaum/Standard. ISBN 978-0-8278-0046-5.
- Jean Dresden Grambs; John C. Carr (January 1991). Modern Methods in Secondary Education. Harcourt Brace College Publishers. ISBN 978-0-03-030408-8.
