= Turnstone Press =

Canadian literary publisher

- Founded: 1976
- Founders: David Arnason, John Beaver, Dennis Cooley, Robert Enright, Daniel Lenoski, Wayne Tefs
- Country of origin: Canada
- Headquarters location: Winnipeg, Manitoba
- Key people: Jamis Paulson, Sharon Caseburg
- Imprints: Ravenstone
- Official website: www.turnstonepress.com

Turnstone Press is a Canadian literary publisher founded in 1976 in Winnipeg, Manitoba, the oldest in Manitoba and among the most respected independent publishers in Canada.

Turnstone was founded in 1976 by academics David Arnason, John Beaver, Dennis Cooley, Robert Enright, Daniel Lenoski, and Wayne Tefs. Initially the company rented space at the University of Manitoba and published chapbooks by Manitoba poets. Turnstone was incorporated in 1983 and since that time, under editors Wayne Tefs, Joan Thomas and others, has grown to become one of the most highly regarded and award-winning independent publishers in Western Canada. Turnstone moved to a space in the Exchange District of Winnipeg and added fiction, literary criticism and literary non-fiction titles. In 1998 Turnstone added the Ravenstone imprint which specializes in literary and experimental mystery and noir fiction.

Turnstone is known for publishing Canadian authors, particularly from Manitoba and the Canadian prairies. Authors associated with Turnstone include Bertram Brooker, Miriam Waddington, John Gould, Lawrence Hill, Robert Kroetsch, Sylvia Legris, Margaret Sweatman, Sally Ito and others. Turnstone has published important works in Icelandic Canadian literature by David Arnason, W. D. Valgardson, and Kristjanna Gunnars and Indigenous Canadian literature by Marvin Francis, Wayne Arthurson, Garry Thomas Morse and others. Since the 1980s, Turnstone has also been a major publisher of Mennonite literature, publishing works by David Bergen, Sandra Birdsell, Di Brandt, Dora Dueck, Patrick Friesen, Miriam Toews, Andrew Unger, and Armin Wiebe, among others.

Turnstone Press books and authors have won or been nominated for numerous literary awards including the Governor General's Literary Awards, the Commonwealth Writer's Prize, the Giller Prize, the Stephen Leacock Prize, the International Dublin Literary Award, the Lambda Literary Awards, the Rogers Writers' Trust Fiction Prize, the ReLit Awards, and other regional awards.
