= List of people from Winnipeg =

This list of people from Winnipeg includes notable people who were born, raised, or who achieved fame in Winnipeg, Manitoba, Canada.

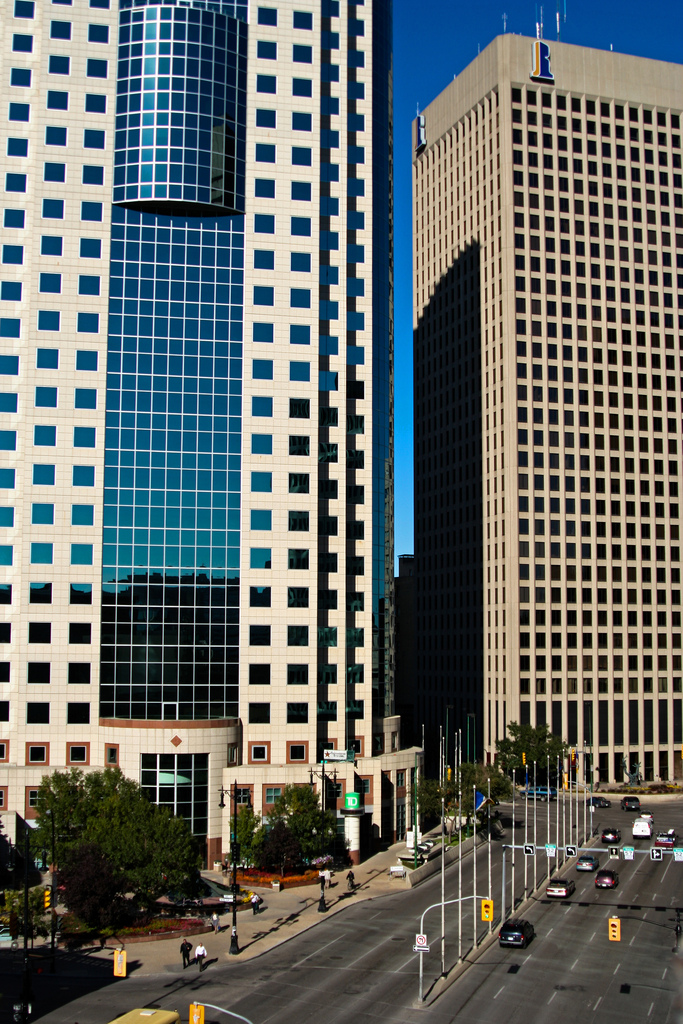
Richardson Building in Winnipeg

== Artists ==
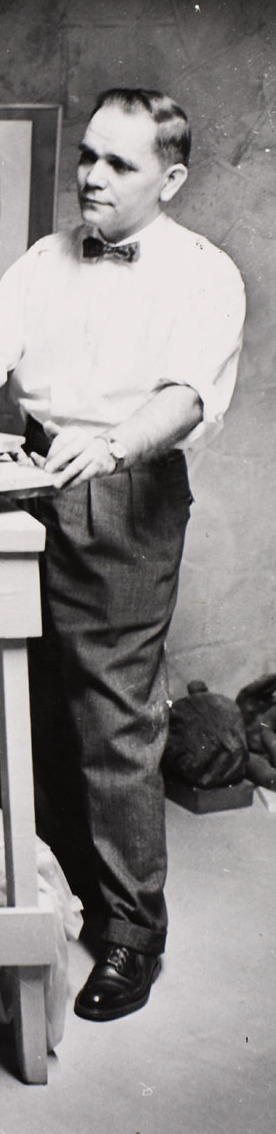
Leo Mol

- K. C. Adams, contemporary artist
- Joyce Anderson, painter and art teacher
- Ian Bawa, filmmaker
- Eleanor Bond, painter
- Bertram Brooker, abstract painter
- Sheila Butler, contemporary artist
- Charles Comfort, painter
- Roewan Crowe, multi-media artist
- Shawna Dempsey and Lorri Millan, performance artists, authors, video & filmmakers
- Aganetha Dyck, contemporary artist
- Marcel Dzama, contemporary artist
- Neil Farber, contemporary artist
- LeMoine Fitzgerald, painter
- Lita Fontaine, interdisciplinary artist
- Étienne Gaboury, architect
- Barb Hunt, contemporary artist
- Sarah Anne Johnson, contemporary artist
- Francis Hans Johnston, painter
- Wanda Koop, interdisciplinary artist
- Gweneth Lloyd, choreographer and co-founder of Royal Winnipeg Ballet
- Guy Maddin, filmmaker
- Leo Mol, stained glass artist
- Kent Monkman, contemporary artist
- Bev Pike, contemporary artist
- Dominique Rey, contemporary artist
- The Royal Art Lodge, contemporary artists
- Lindsay Shearer-Nelko, choreographer
- Arnold Spohr, choreographer
- The Steiner Brothers, tap-dancing trio and Mouseketeer Ron Steiner
- Reva Stone, artist
- Diana Thorneycroft, photographer
- Rhayne Vermette, filmmaker
- Diane Whitehouse, painter

== Sports persons ==
=== Ice hockey ===
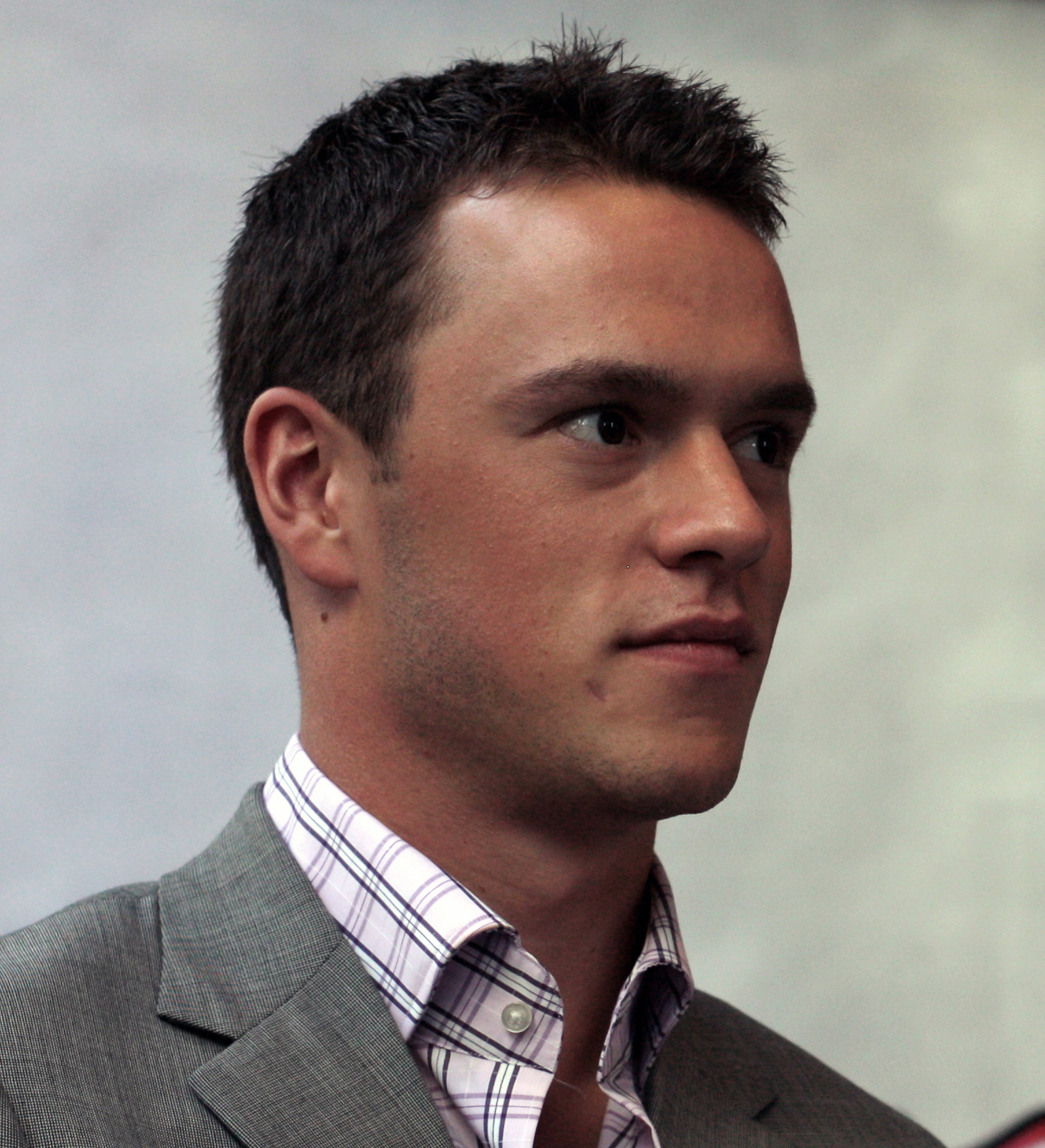
Jonathan Toews

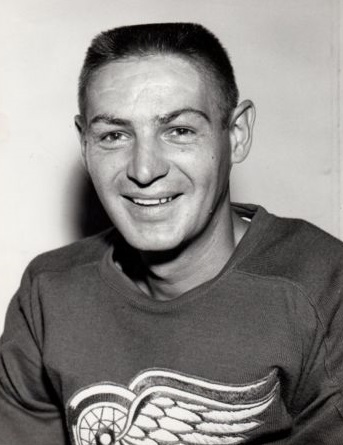
Terry Sawchuk

- Reg Abbott
- Jim Agnew
- Clint Albright
- Bill Allum
- Carter Ashton
- Cam Barker
- Andy Bathgate
- Ken Baumgartner
- Paul Baxter
- Gordie Bell
- Joe Bell
- Robert Benson
- Andy Blair
- Lonny Bohonos
- Larry Bolonchuk
- Ryan Bonni
- Dick Bouchard
- Dan Bourbonnais
- Madison Bowey
- Ralph Bowman
- Jack Bownass
- Dustin Boyd
- Darren Boyko
- Bailey Bram
- Rube Brandow
- Andy Branigan
- Duane Bray
- Billy Breen
- Delayne Brian
- Gerry Brisson
- Turk Broda
- George Brown
- Harold Brown
- Larry Brown
- Cecil Browne
- Ray Brunel
- Ed Bruneteau
- Mud Bruneteau
- Barry Brust
- Al Buchanan
- Bill Burega
- Shawn Byram
- Walter Byron
- Ryan Caldwell
- Don Caley
- Matt Calvert
- Jim Cardiff
- Bruce Carmichael
- Al Carr
- Greg Carroll
- Art Chapman
- Christian Chartier
- Dave Chartier
- Brad Chartrand
- Wayne Chernecki
- Stefan Cherneski
- Rich Chernomaz
- Ron Chipperfield
- Elliot Chorley
- Bob Chrystal
- Brad Church
- Andrew Clark
- Kevin Clark
- Bobby Clarke
- Brian Coates
- Delaney Collins
- Jim Collins
- Red Conn
- Jack Connolly
- Cam Connor
- Joe Cooper
- Riley Cote
- Art Coulter
- Thomas Coulter
- Adam Courchaine
- Rosario Couture
- Jimmy Creighton
- Jimmy Creighton
- Clifford Crowley
- Joe Crozier
- Wilf Cude
- Cory Cyrenne
- Joe Daley
- Kimbi Daniels
- Max Domi
- Jordy Douglas
- Jimmy Dunn
- Mary Dunn
- Red Dutton
- Cody Eakin
- Joel Edmundson
- Gary Emmons
- Brian Engblom
- Dean Evason
- Bill Ezinicki
- Frank Fredrickson
- Byron Froese
- Owen Fussey
- Herb Gardiner
- Chay Genoway
- Hammy Gillespie
- Butch Goring
- Cody Glass
- Haldor Halderson
- Al Hamilton
- Travis Hamonic
- Ted Harris
- Andy Hebenton
- Darren Helm
- Phil Hergesheimer
- Wally Hergesheimer
- Bryan Hextall
- Ike Hildebrand
- Cecil Hoekstra
- Quinton Howden
- Dave Hrechkosy
- Ted Irvine
- Seth Jarvis
- Paul Jerrard
- Konrad Johannesson
- Ching Johnson
- Jim Johnson
- Eddie Johnstone
- Mike Keane
- Duncan Keith
- Julian Klymkiw
- Aggie Kukulowicz
- Ed Kullman
- Gord Labossiere
- Max Labovitch
- Gord Lane
- Pete Langelle
- Derek Laxdal
- Jamie Leach
- Mike Leclerc
- Grant Ledyard
- Chuck Lefley
- Brendan Leipsic
- Bob Leiter
- Curtis Leschyshyn
- Odie Lowe
- Brooks Macek
- Bill MacKenzie
- Fred Marples
- Bill Masterton
- Fred Maxwell
- Dunc McCallum
- Kevin McCarthy
- Ab McDonald
- Dylan McIlrath
- Doug McMurdy
- Jacob Micflikier
- Nick Mickoski
- Perry Miller
- Bill Mosienko
- Colton Orr
- Nolan Patrick
- James Patrick
- Steve Patrick
- Johnny Peirson
- Calvin Pickard
- Alf Pike
- Ken Reardon
- Terry Reardon
- Billy Reay
- Ryan Reaves
- James Reimer
- Mike Ridley
- Claude C. Robinson, ice hockey executive, inductee into the Hockey Hall of Fame
- Dunc Rousseau
- Terry Sawchuk
- Dave Semenko
- Damon Severson
- Patrick Sharp
- Alex Shibicky
- Ron Shudra
- Warren Skorodenski
- Sami Jo Small
- Art Somers
- Emory Sparrow
- Lorne Stamler
- Wally Stanowski
- Alexander Steen
- Pete Stemkowski
- Blair Stewart
- Mark Stone
- Kati Tabin
- Billy Taylor
- Jimmy Thomson
- Kevin Todd
- Jonathan Toews
- Lindsay Vallis
- Dale Weise
- Duvie Westcott
- Ian White
- Neil Wilkinson
- Carey Wilson
- Allan Woodman
- Bob Woytowich
- Ken Wregget
- Mike Yaschuk
- Travis Zajac
- Chick Zamick

=== Basketball ===
- Emmanuel Akot, college basketball player
- Eric Bridgeland, college basketball coach
- Joey Johnson, wheelchair basketball player
- Todd MacCulloch, NBA center for the Philadelphia 76ers and the New Jersey Nets
- Rick McNair, basketball coach and founder of Winnipeg Fringe Festival
- Erfan Nasajpour, professional basketball player
- Jarred Ogungbemi-Jackson, professional basketball player
- Chad Posthumus, professional basketball player
- Carl Ridd, professional basketball player
- Martin Riley, Olympic basketball player
- Daniel Sackey, college basketball player
- BT Toews, professional basketball coach and father of Kai Toews
- Bob Town, Olympic basketball player
- Joey Vickery, professional basketball player
- Roy Williams, Olympic basketball player
- Malcolm Wiseman, Olympic basketball player

=== Football ===
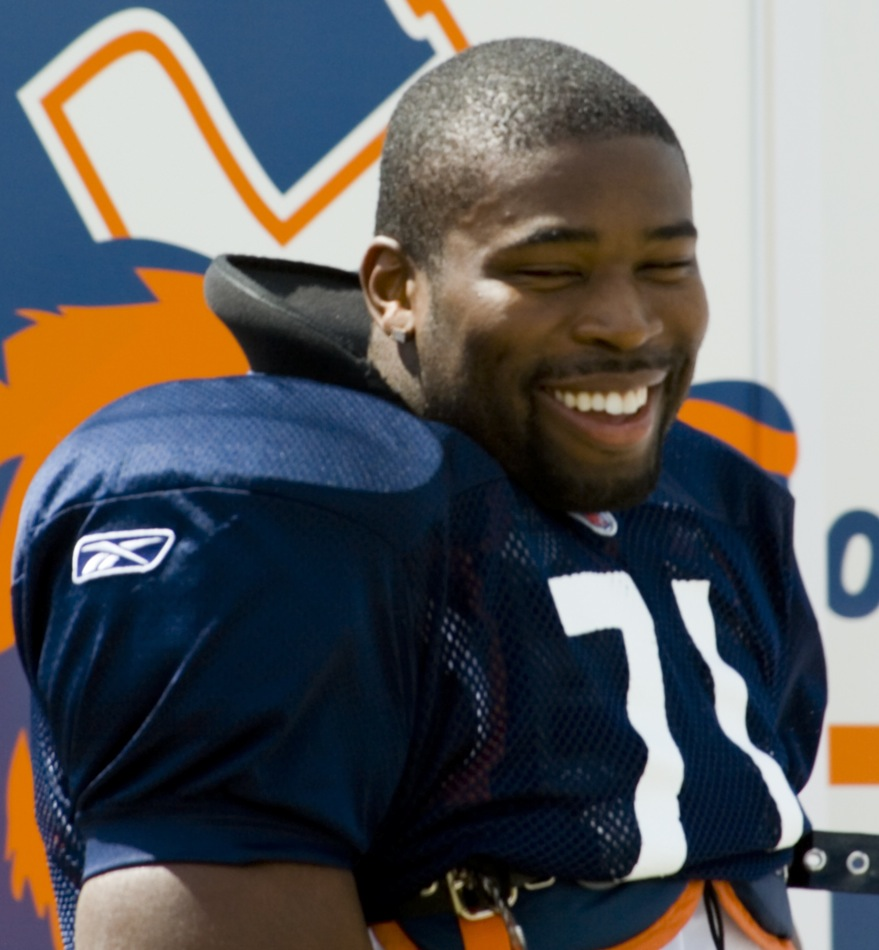
Israel Idonije

- Al Ackland, professional football player
- Donovan Alexander, professional football player
- Randy Ambrosie, professional football player, CFL commissioner
- Bill Baker, professional football player
- Keith Bennett, professional football player
- Lorne Benson, professional football player
- Mike Benson, professional football player
- Andy Bieber, professional football player
- Simon Blaszczak, professional football player
- Ken Bochen, professional football player
- Bill Boivin, professional football player
- James Bond, professional football player
- Doug Brown, professional football defensive tackle
- Brady Browne, professional football player
- Jack Bruzell, professional football player
- Zac Carlson, professional football player
- Jim Carphin, professional football player
- Bill Ceretti, professional football player
- Walter Chikowski, professional football player
- Scott Coe, professional football player
- Anthony Coombs, professional football player
- Billy Cooper, professional football player
- Bruce Covernton, professional football player
- Nic Demski, professional football player
- Brian Dobie, coach for the University of Manitoba Bisons
- George Druxman, professional football player
- Leo Ezerins, professional football player
- Scott Flagel, professional football player
- Jim Furlong, professional football player
- Evan Gill, professional football player
- Geoff Gray, professional football offensive lineman
- Roger Hamelin, professional football player
- John Hammond, professional football player
- Andrew Harris, professional football player
- Ben Hatskin, professional football player
- Rod Hill, professional football cornerback
- Israel Idonije, professional football defensive end who led the NFL in blocked punts in 2005, 2006, and 2007
- T. J. Jones, professional football player
- Les Lear, professional football player
- Wade Miller, professional football player, Winnipeg Blue Bombers president and CEO
- Cal Murphy, coach, scout, and player
- Brady Oliveira, professional football player
- David Onyemata, first NFL player ever drafted from the University of Manitoba
- Don Oramasionwu, professional football player
- T-Dre Player, professional football player
- Joe Poplawski, professional football player
- Chad Rempel, professional football player
- Mike Richardson, professional football player
- Bobby Singh, professional football player
- Eddie Steele, professional football player
- John Urschel, professional football player and mathematician
- Fred Vant Hull, professional football player
- Chris Walby, professional football player
- Zack Williams, professional football player

=== Wrestling ===
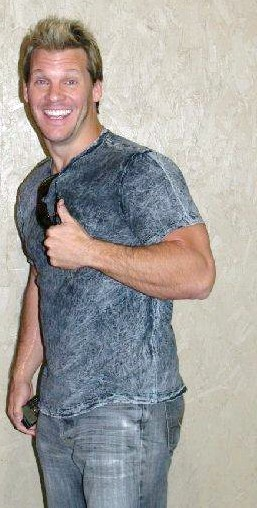
Chris Jericho

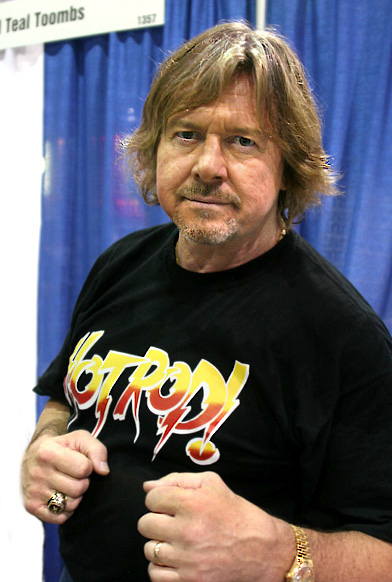
Roddy Piper

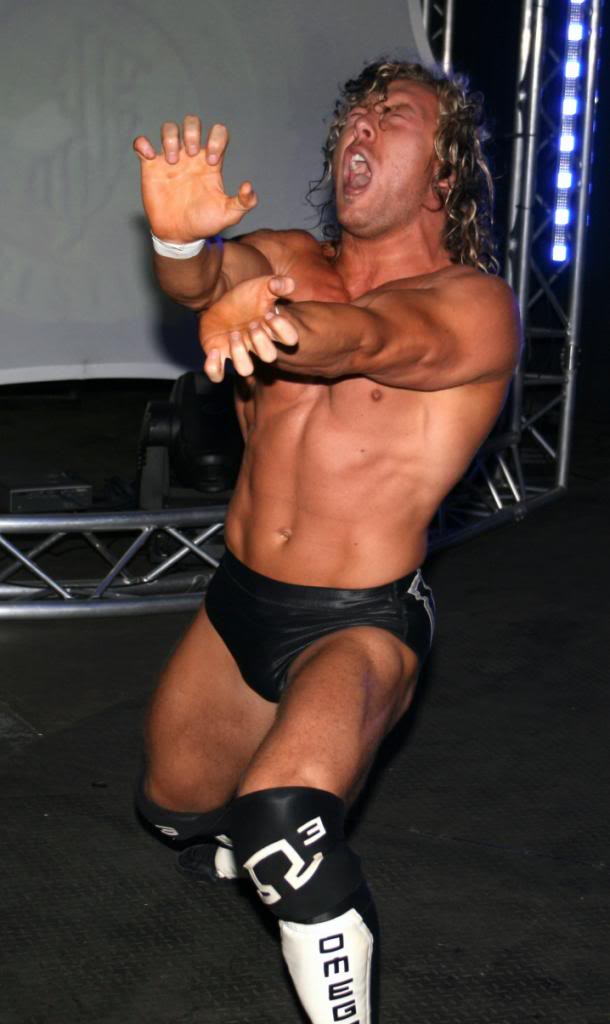
Kenny Omega

- Bob Brown, professional wrestler
- Kerry Brown, professional wrestler
- Don Callis, professional wrestling manager currently signed to All Elite Wrestling
- Tony Condello, professional wrestler and promoter
- Cathy Corino, professional wrestler
- Steve Corino, professional wrestler
- Chi Chi Cruz, professional wrestler
- Allison Danger, professional wrestler
- Johnny Devine, professional wrestler
- Paul Diamond, professional wrestler
- Danny Duggan, professional wrestler
- Robert Evans, professional wrestler
- George Gordienko, professional wrestler inducted into the Professional Wrestling Hall of Fame and Museum
- David Hohl, professional wrestler
- Ricky Hunter, professional wrestler
- Chris Jericho, WWE legend and lead singer for Fozzy currently signed to All Elite Wrestling
- Tom Magee, professional wrestler and bodybuilder
- Kenny Omega, professional wrestler and executive vice president of All Elite Wrestling
- Fred Peloquin, professional wrestler
- Roddy Piper, professional wrestler inducted into WWE Hall of Fame
- Courtney Rush, professional wrestler
- Sarah Stock, professional wrestler
- Al Tomko, professional wrestler
- The Von Steigers, professional wrestling tag team

=== Martial arts ===
- Mark Berger, professional judoka
- Robin Black, mixed martial artist
- Roland Delorme, UFC bantamweight
- Joe Doerksen, mixed martial artist
- Baxter Humby, kickboxer
- Brad Katona, UFC bantamweight
- Donny Lalonde, boxer
- Krzysztof Soszynski, UFC heavyweight

=== Curling ===
- Dawn Askin
- Kerry Burtnyk
- Don Duguid
- Randy Dutiaume
- Cathy Gauthier
- Steve Gould
- Janet Harvey
- Jennifer Jones
- Jon Mead
- John Morris
- B. J. Neufeld
- Chris Neufeld
- Denni Neufeld
- Jill Officer
- Cathy Overton-Clapham
- Gord Paterson
- Sam Penwarden
- Corinne Peters
- Daley Peters
- Vic Peters
- Kelly Scott
- Jeff Stoughton
- Bob Ursel
- Garry Van Den Berghe
- Ken Watson

=== Speed skating ===
- Susan Auch
- Clara Hughes
- Cindy Klassen
- Doreen McCannell-Botterill

=== Golf ===
- Harold Eidsvig
- Bill Ezinicki
- Dan Halldorson
- George Knudson
- Nick Taylor

=== Volleyball ===
- Wanda Guenette
- Scott Koskie
- Garth Pischke
- Taylor Pischke

=== Soccer ===
- Marco Bustos
- Paul Fenwick
- Kianz Froese
- Doug McMahon
- Sophie Schmidt
- Desiree Scott
- Héctor Vergara, FIFA referee

=== Others ===
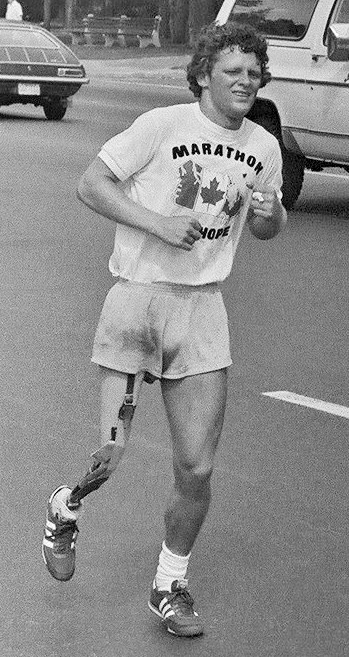
Terry Fox

- Amber Balcaen, racecar driver, first Canadian female to win a NASCAR race in the United States
- J. Howard Crocker, educator and sports executive with the YMCA and Amateur Athletic Union of Canada
- Jamie Cudmore, rugby union player
- Terry Fox, cancer activist and long-distance runner
- Evelyn Goshawk, long jumper, first Manitoban woman to represent Canada in an international sports event
- Norm Hadley, rugby union player
- Gordon Orlikow (born 1960), decathlon, heptathlon, and hurdles competitor; Athletics Canada chairman; Canadian Olympic Committee member; Korn/Ferry International partner
- Rachel Riddell, water polo player
- Michael Schmidt, ten-pin bowler
- Bill Werbeniuk, snooker player
- Teri York, diver

== Business ==
- Ida Albo, owner of the Fort Garry Hotel
- David Asper, lawyer and co-founder of Amenity Healthcare Limited
- Izzy Asper, founder of CanWest
- Gail Asper, president of the Asper Foundation
- Leonard Asper, CEO of Anthem Sports & Entertainment
- David Baszucki, co-founder and CEO of Roblox
- George Montegu Black II, businessman, president of Canadian Breweries
- Marion Bryce (1839–1920), cofounder and first president of Christian Women's Union of Winnipeg
- Mark Chipman, owner of the Winnipeg Jets
- Bill Comrie, founder of The Brick
- Matthew Corrin, founder of Freshii
- David Culver, chairman and CEO of Alcan
- David Dreman, founder of Dreman Value Management
- Robert W. Fleming, Mayo Clinic executive
- Sydney Halter, the first CFL commissioner, officer of the Order of Canada
- F. Ross Johnson, former CEO of RJR Nabisco, featured in the book and film Barbarians at the Gate
- Philip Kives, founder of K-tel
- Jack Levit, real estate developer, CEO of Lakeview Management Inc.
- Peter Nygård, founder of Nygård International
- John Draper Perrin, president of the Winnipeg Warriors Hockey Club
- James Armstrong Richardson, served as CEO of Richardson International
- Irv Robbins, co-founder of Baskin-Robbins
- Gerry Schwartz, founder and CEO of Onex Corporation
- Andrew Strempler, served as president and CEO of Mediplan Health Consulting Inc
- Bryan Turner, founder of Priority Records which signed artists like Snoop Dogg, Jay-Z and Ice Cube
- Lyle Wright, president of the Minneapolis Arena, United States Hockey Hall of Fame inductee

== Journalists ==
- Ashleigh Banfield
- Rosemary Barton
- Rod Black
- Tyler Brûlé
- Jim Coleman
- John Wesley Dafoe
- Charles Edwards
- Dawna Friesen
- Bob Hunter
- Vince Leah
- Stewart MacPherson
- Ken McKenzie
- Ben Metcalfe
- Bob Moir
- Enid Nemy
- Don Newman
- Scott Oake
- Catherine Seipp
- Hal Sigurdson
- Andrea Slobodian
- Maurice Smith
- Jeremy St. Louis
- Brian Williams
- Scott Young
- Larry Zolf

== Musicians ==
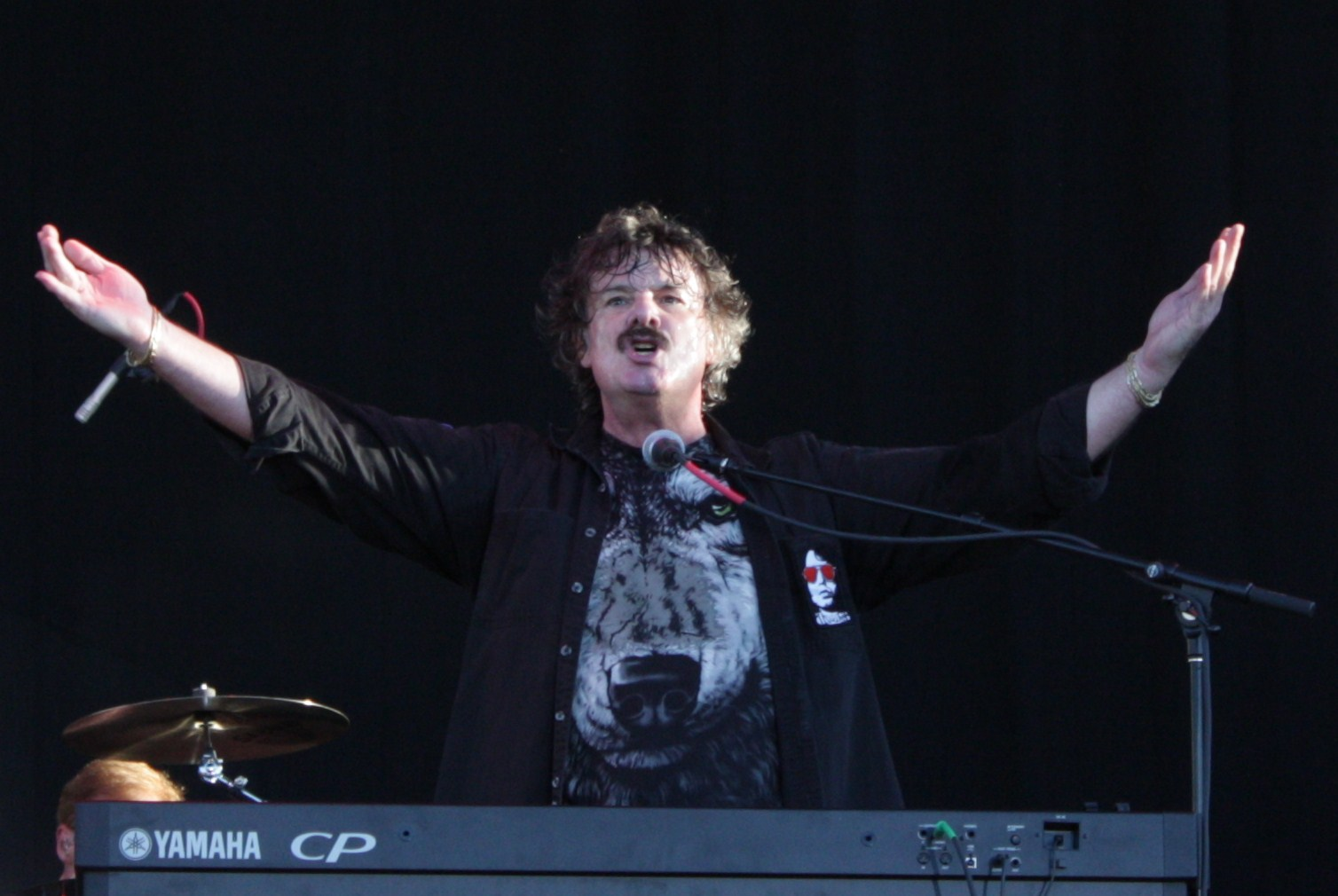
Burton Cummings

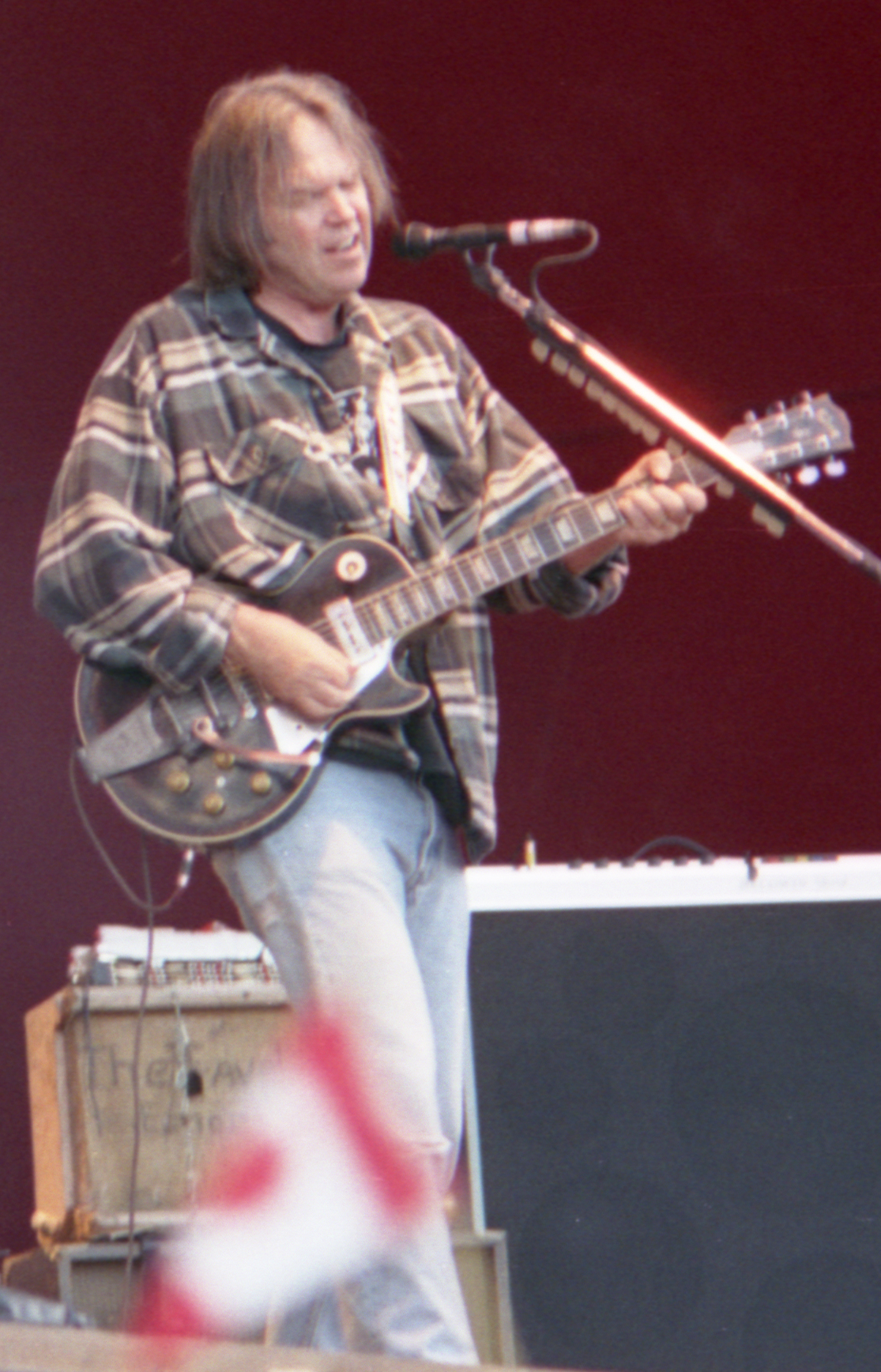
Neil Young

== Film and television ==
=== Actors ===
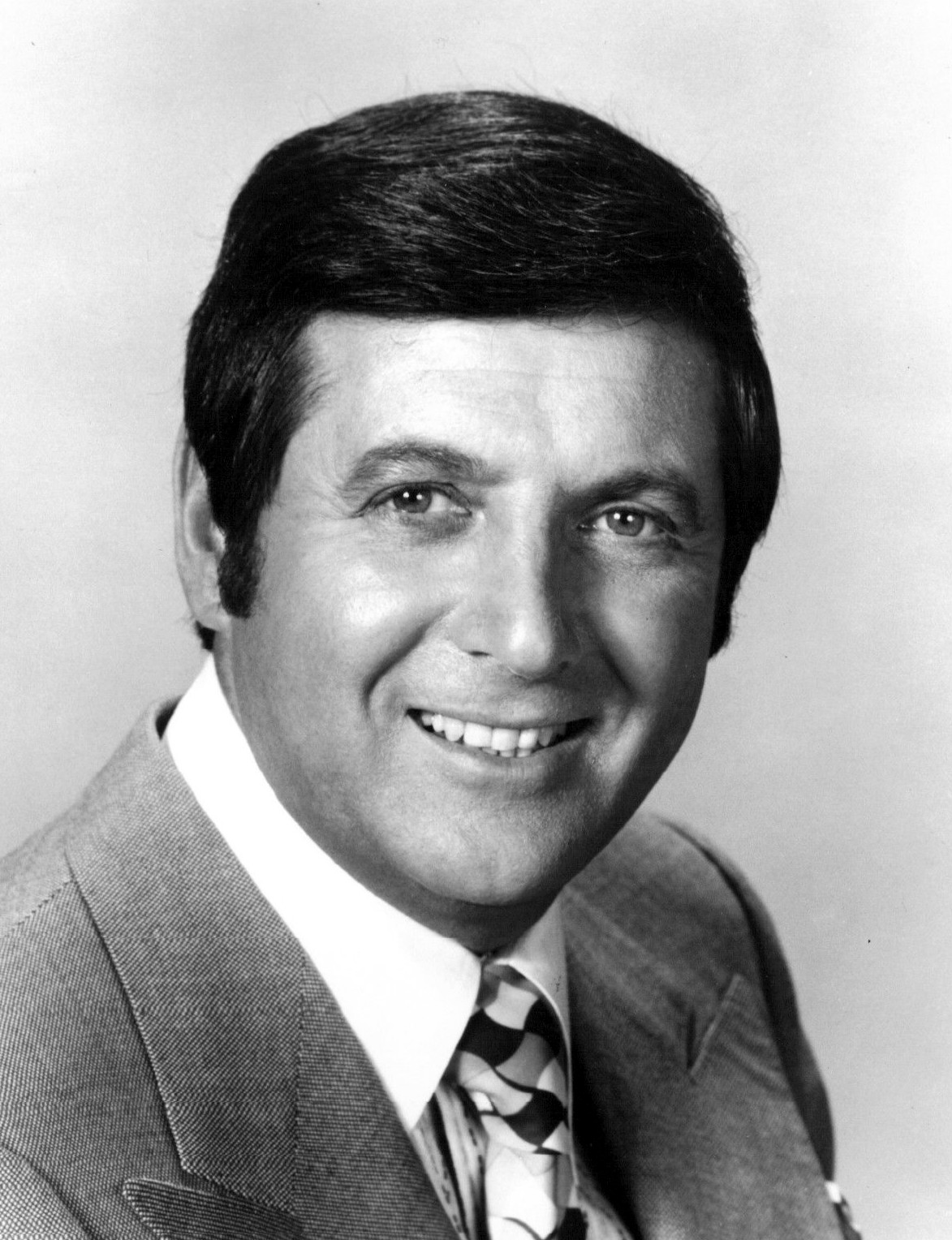
Monty Hall

- Thom Allison
- Ted Atherton
- Cameron Bancroft
- Robert Bockstael
- Peter Boretski
- Steve Braun
- Jay Brazeau
- Greg Bryk
- Len Cariou
- Doug Chapman
- Jonas Chernick
- Ari Cohen
- Michael D. Cohen
- Mychael Danna
- Wallace Douglas
- Brian Drader
- Ed Evanko
- Tibor Feheregyhazi
- Brendan Fehr
- Ken Finkleman
- Daniel Gillies
- Monty Hall
- Joshua Henry
- Tom Jackson
- Robert Jeffrey
- Gerald MacIntosh Johnston
- Richard Kahan
- Ryan Kennedy
- Jack Kruschen
- Jeremy Kushnier
- Daniel Lavoie
- Fletcher Markle
- Paul Maxwell
- Tom McCamus
- Glen Meadmore
- Lee Montgomery
- Peter Mooney
- Corteon Moore
- Bob Nolan
- John Paizs
- Aleks Paunovic
- Ross Petty
- Douglas Rain
- Donnelly Rhodes
- Kenny Robinson
- Ron Rubin
- Ted Rusoff
- Jason Ruta
- Kerry Shale
- David Steinberg
- Robert Tinkler
- Adam Tsekhman
- Kristopher Turner
- Ryan Ward
- Marshall Williams
- Ty Wood

=== Actresses ===
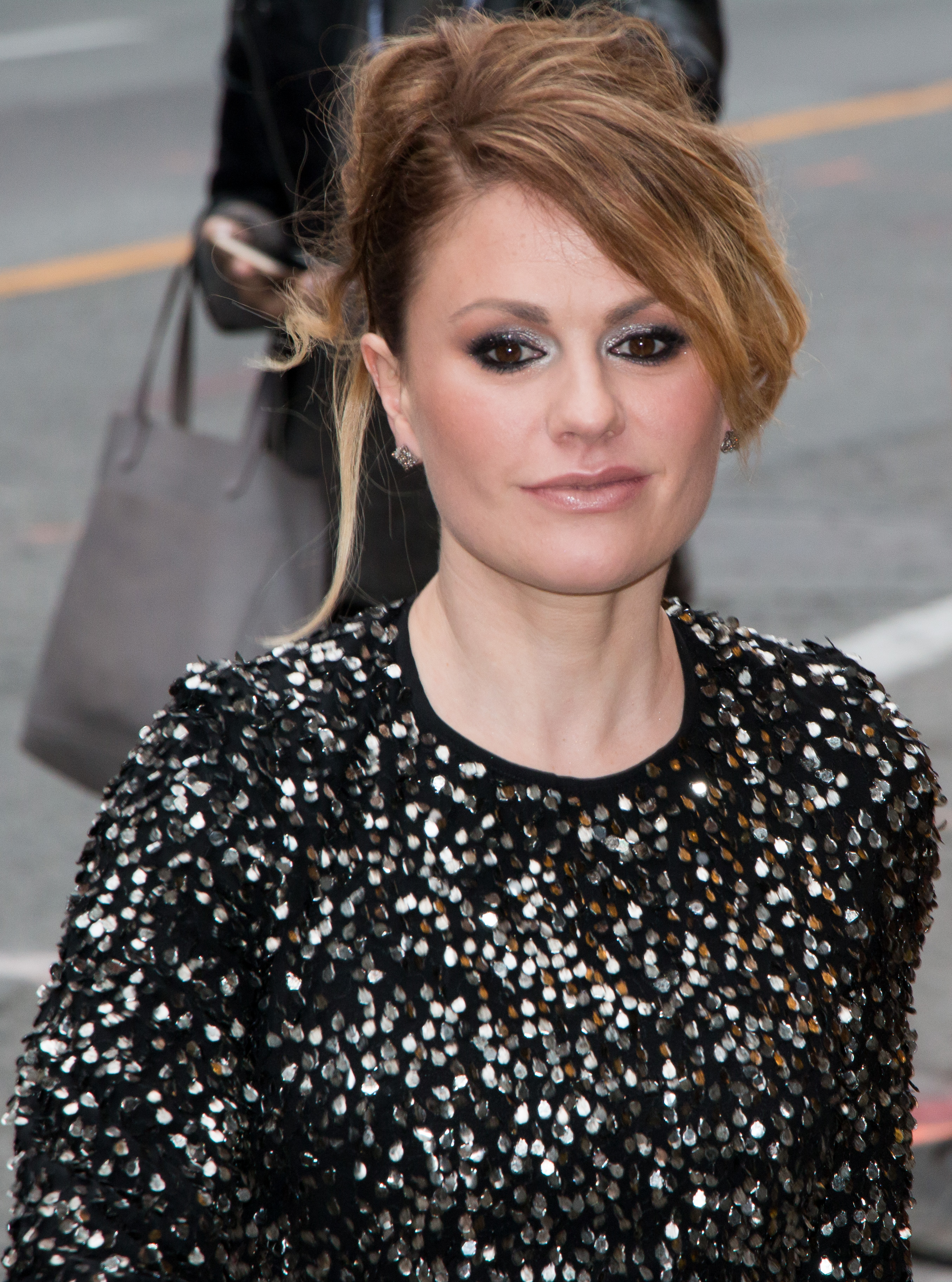
Anna Paquin

- Claire Adams
- Julia Benson
- Bif Naked
- Martha Burns
- Nancy Castiglione
- Lisa Codrington
- Heather Doerksen
- Deanna Durbin
- Melissa Elias
- Ida Engel
- Tamara Gorski
- Dianne Heatherington
- Tina Keeper
- Chantal Kreviazuk
- Mimi Kuzyk
- Susan Leblanc
- Carla Lehmann
- Nadia Litz
- Andrea Macasaet
- Gisele MacKenzie
- Mara Marini
- Belinda Montgomery
- Libby Morris
- Brooke Palsson
- Anna Paquin
- Dorothy Patrick
- Shirley Patterson
- Jess Salgueiro
- Pamela Mala Sinha
- Tracy Spiridakos
- Johanna Stein
- Louriza Tronco
- Charie Van Dyke
- Nia Vardalos
- Gwynyth Walsh
- Marjorie White
- Catherine Wreford

== Military ==
- Leo Clarke
- Robert Cruickshank
- Frederick William Hall
- Coulson Norman Mitchell
- Andrew Charles Mynarski
- Walter Natynczyk
- Christopher O'Kelly
- Frank Pickersgill
- Jenny Pike
- H.L.N. Salmon
- Robert Shankland
- Daniel Spry
- William Stephenson (known as "Intrepid")

== Writers ==
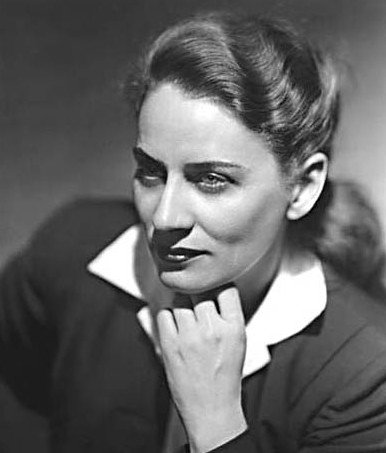
Gabrielle Roy

- Frank Albo
- George Amabile
- David Arnason
- Joanne Arnott
- Nahlah Ayed
- Constance Backhouse
- Marie Annharte Baker
- Herbert Belyea
- Margret Benedictsson
- Sandra Birdsell
- Salem Bland
- Laurie Block
- Patricia Blondal
- Carol Bolt
- Paulette Bourgeois
- Marilyn Bowering
- Ken Brand
- Barbara Branden
- Barry Broadfoot
- Margaret Buffie
- Tyler Clark Burke
- Bonnie Burstow
- Aaron Bushkowsky
- Kristin Butcher
- Alison Calder
- Norman Cantor
- Fern G. Z. Carr
- Rick Chafe
- Barry Chamish
- Myriam J. A. Chancy
- Catherine Chatterley
- Jonas Chernick
- Solomon Cleaver
- Lisa Codrington
- Jennifer Cohen
- Lisa R. Cohen
- Ruth Collie
- Ralph Connor
- Geoffrey Cornish
- Andrew Coyne
- Lorilee Craker
- Anita Daher
- William Arthur Deacon
- Vicki Delany
- David Demchuk
- Muriel Denison
- Kady MacDonald Denton
- Michelle Desbarats
- Grant Dexter
- Olive Dickason
- Nathan Divinsky
- Kevin Doherty
- Brian Drader
- David Dreman
- Dora Dueck
- Jo-Ann Episkenew
- Ernie Epp
- Ian C. Esslemont
- Danishka Esterhazy
- Christine Fellows
- Jon Paul Fiorentino
- Valerie Fortney
- Sean Garrity
- Zsuzsi Gartner
- Dave Godfrey
- Suzanne Goldenberg
- Noam Gonick
- Allan Gotlieb
- Sondra Gotlieb
- George R. D. Goulet
- Neile Graham
- David Gratzer
- Daniel Greaves
- Archie Green
- Eric Gurney
- Marilyn Hall
- Rovin Hardy
- Anne Hart
- Kaj Hasselriis
- Ruth Heller
- Tom Hendry
- Joanne Hershfield
- Pablo Hidalgo
- John C. Higgins
- Ella Cora Hind
- Gerda Hnatyshyn
- Linda Holeman
- Chris Huebner
- Jack Humphrey
- Catherine Hunter
- Stanley Jackson
- Michael Kaan
- Adeena Karasick
- Guy Gavriel Kay
- Diane Keating
- John Keeble
- Sandra Kirby
- Jon Klassen
- Sarah Klassen
- Frances Koncan
- Ken Kostick
- Allan Kroeker
- Robert Kroetsch
- Margaret Laurence
- Howard Leeds
- Sylvia Legris
- Cyril Edel Leonoff
- Greg Leskiw
- J. R. Léveillé
- Benjamin Levin
- Allan Levine
- Diana Lindsay
- Robert Linsley
- Dorothy Livesay
- Jack Ludwig
- Jake MacDonald
- Mary MacLane
- Guy Maddin
- Kuzhali Manickavel
- Gilles Marchildon
- Don Marks
- John Marlyn
- Bill Mason
- Shirlee Matheson
- Chandra Mayor
- Kyle McCulloch
- Robert McDonald
- Brock McElheran
- A. B. McKillop
- Marshall McLuhan
- Bobby McMahon
- Mike McPhaden
- Maurice Mierau
- Roy Miki
- Earl Mindell
- Susie Moloney
- Pat Roy Mooney
- Beatrice Mosionier
- Michael Nathanson
- Allan Novak
- Sheldon Oberman
- Patrick O’Connell
- Carol Off
- Jill Officer
- Margo Oliver
- Walt Patterson
- Leonard Peikoff
- Carol Philipps
- Casey Plett
- Laurent Poliquin
- Jackie Rae
- Lara Rae
- Harry Rintoul
- Thomas Beattie Roberton
- David Robertson
- Heather Robertson
- Malcolm Ross
- Gabrielle Roy
- Jaroslav Rudnyckyj
- Ted Rusoff
- Alexei Maxim Russell
- Frances Russell
- Ed Russenholt
- Laura Salverson
- John K. Samson
- David Secter
- Patricia Alice Shaw
- Carol Shields
- Merilyn Simonds
- Pamela Mala Sinha
- Gwen Smid
- Adam Smoluk
- Don Starkell
- Johanna Stein
- Noreen Stevens
- Margaret Sweatman
- Astra Taylor
- Wayne Tefs
- J. Grant Thiessen
- Vern Thiessen
- Joan Thomas
- Lillian Beynon Thomas
- Clayton Thomas-Müller
- Gwen Thompson
- Robert Tinkler
- Georgia Toews
- Miriam Toews
- Rhea Tregebov
- Andrew Unger
- W. D. Valgardson
- Katherena Vermette
- Armin Wiebe
- Daniel Woolf

== Scientists ==
- G. Michael Bancroft, chemist and synchrotron scientist, first director of the Canadian Light Source
- Ronald Freedman
- Velvl Greene
- Jennifer Gunter
- Doreen Kimura
- Frances Gertrude McGill
- Roderick McKenzie
- Chris McKinstry
- Alfred Needler
- Jim Peebles
- Louis Slotin
- Mindel Sheps
- W. G. Unruh

== Crime ==
- Danny Wolfe, gangster
- Richard Wolfe, gangster

== Judiciary ==
- Kimberly Prost, judge of the International Criminal Court
