= Jon Pylypchuk =

Canadian artist (born 1972)

Jonathan Pylypchuk (born 1972) is a Canadian painter and sculptor, living and working in Los Angeles.

Born in Winnipeg, Manitoba, Canada, from parents of Ukrainian ascent, Pylypchuk studied in 1996 at the Yale University Summer School of Music and Art, New Haven, earned a BFA with Honors in 1997 at the University of Manitoba, and an MFA in 2001 at the University of California, Los Angeles.

His work includes sculptures, paintings and drawings, and he has presented his art under the pseudonym Rudy Bust. He was a member of the artist collective known as The Royal Art Lodge (1996–2008) founded by Michael Dumontier, Adrian Williams, Neil Farber, Marcel Dzama, and Drue Langlois, though Pylypchuk was only active in 1996 through 1998.

Pylypchuk has shown internationally in both his solo career and in his collaboration with the Royal Art Lodge. His work has featured at galleries and museums including the Museum of Contemporary Art Cleveland, the Museum of Contemporary Art Detroit, the UCLA Hammer Museum in Los Angeles, the ZKM Museum in Germany, the Royal Academy in London, the State Hermitage in St. Petersburg, and the Musée d'art contemporain de Montréal. He is represented by China Art Objects in Los Angeles, Friedrich Petzel in New York and Eric Hussenot in Paris.

Pylypchuk with his friend opened an art gallery in downtown Los Angeles named Grice Bench in 2014.
