= Leonard Moore (literary agent) =

British literary agent

Leonard Parker Moore
- Born: United Kingdom
- Died: January , 1959
- Occupation: Literary agent
- Employer(s): Christy & Moore and Lecture Agency, Ltd.
- Known for: Literary agent for George Orwell

Leonard Parker Moore (died January 1959) was an English literary agent who became known due to being the literary agent for author George Orwell through their letters.

== Early life ==
Injured in the leg in the First World War, Moore worked as a journalist before becoming a literary agent.

== Career ==
A partner of Christy & Moore and of the Lecture Agency, Ltd., his clients included George Orwell (from 1932 to 1950), Gordon Campbell, Mary Butts, Georgette Heyer (for nearly 30 years from 1922), Carola Oman, Marco Pallis, Catherine Cookson, Jane Mander,Ruby M. Ayres, Gareth Jones, Wilfred Grenfell, and Ruth Collie.

=== Orwell ===
It was in a letter to Moore, in November 1932, regarding the future publication of Down and Out in Paris and London, that Eric Blair first came up with the pseudonym "George Orwell".

According to the historian Daniel J. Leab, some 500 of Orwell's letters to his agent have survived, of which nearly 100 were acquired by the Lilly Library in 1959.

== Bibliography ==
- Shelden, Michael (ed.) George Orwell: Ten Animal Farm Letters to His Agent, Leonard Moore (1984)

== Personal life ==
He was the brother of the novelist Henry Moore.
