= Albu =

Albu may refer to:

- Albu (surname)
- Albu Parish, municipality in Järva County, Estonia
- Albu, Estonia, village in Albu Parish
- Albu Salih, an Arabic tribe
- Albu River, a tributary of the Pârgavu River, Romania

== See also ==
- Pârâul lui Albu
- Albus (disambiguation)
- Albos (disambiguation)
