= Michael Dumontier =

- Born: 1974 (age 51–52); Winnipeg, Manitoba, Canada
- Known for: Contemporary artist

Michael Dumontier (born 1974) is a contemporary artist who lives and works in Winnipeg. His work has been exhibited internationally including in New York City, Boston, and Padua, Italy. He is known in particular his minimal paintings and collages. He may be best known for this collaborations with Marcel Dzama, Neil Farber and others as a founding member of The Royal Art Lodge.

Dumontier was born in Winnipeg, Manitoba, Canada.

== Gallery Representation ==
Dumontier is currently represented by MKG127 in Toronto.
