= Albo (disambiguation) =

Albo is a nickname for Anthony Albanese, the current Prime Minister of Australia.

Albo may also refer to:

== People ==
- Dave Albo (born 1962), Virginia politician
- Frank Albo, a researcher and teacher from the University of Winnipeg
- Ida Albo, a managing partner of the Fort Garry Hotel in Winnipeg, Canada
- Joseph Albo (c. 1380 – c. 1444), 15th century Jewish rabbi
- Robert Albo (1932–2011), American sports physician and magician

== Other uses ==
- Albo Hundred, a local legislative district of Sweden
- Albo Panchina d'Oro (Golden Bench), an annual title awarded to the best Italian football (soccer) coach of the Serie A season
- Monte Albo, a limestone massif 13 kilometres wide, in the central eastern portion of Island of Sardinia, Italy
- Offensive ethnic slur referring to an Albanian

== See also ==
- Albos (disambiguation)
