= Jennifer Cohen =

Jennifer Cohen may refer to:

- Jennifer Cohen (athletic director) (born 1969), American athletics administrator
- Jennifer Cohen (fitness) (born 1976), American fitness personality, author, and body image consultant
