= Sarah Morewood =

American poet (1823–1863)

- Born: Sarah Anne Huyler; September 15, 1823; Passaic, New Jersey, US
- Died: October 16, 1863 (aged 40); Pittsfield, Massachusetts, US
- Resting place: Pittsfield Cemetery
- Known for: Relationship with Herman Melville
- Spouse: John Rowland Morewood (1821–1903)
- Children: 3

Sarah Morewood (September 15, 1823 – October 16, 1863) was a poet and literary figure who developed a close relationship in the 1850s with her nearest neighbor in the Berkshires, the novelist Herman Melville. In 1983 Professor Michael Rogin of the University of California, Berkeley, was the first to suggest that Morewood was a model for the character of Isabel in Melville's dark novel of romance and ambition Pierre; or, The Ambiguities (1852). Thirty-three years later biographer Michael Shelden argued in Melville in Love (2016) that Morewood influenced Melville's work not only in Pierre, but also in Moby-Dick (1851), and that for much of the 1850s the two were lovers.

== Early years ==
Born in New Jersey in 1823, Sarah Anne Huyler was the seventh of nine children in an American-Dutch family of "modest means." In 1845 she married John Rowland Morewood, a wealthy English-born businessman in New York, with whom she had a son in 1847. A troubled pregnancy left her in poor health, which she sought to improve by spending summers in the Berkshires. There, as Hershel Parker was the first to show, Sarah Morewood engaged in a flirtatious summer romance with Alexander Gardiner—President John Tyler's brother-in-law—and she soon came to be regarded in some local circles as "a married woman who permitted herself reckless friendships with men other than her husband." At the same time, she also acquired a modest reputation in the Berkshires as a promising poet. In September 1850 one of her poems was set to music and sung by a choir at the dedication of the Pittsfield Cemetery, an occasion which also featured Oliver Wendell Holmes Sr. reading one of his poems.

== Relationship with Herman Melville ==
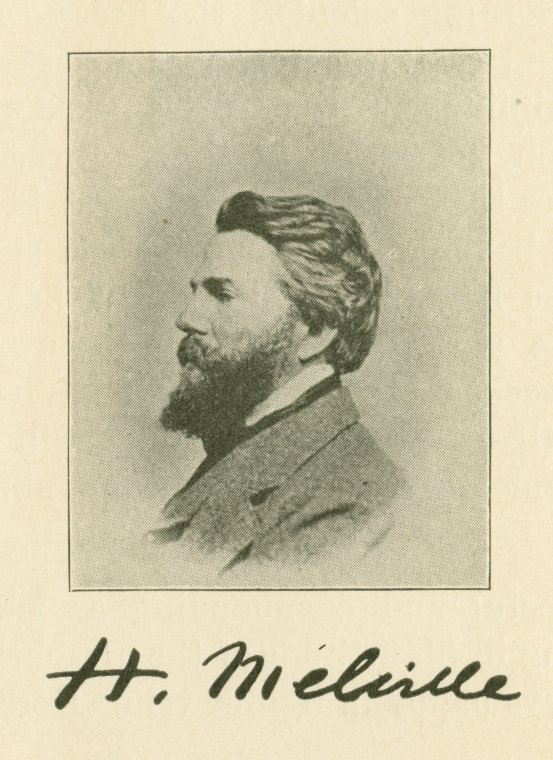
Morewood shared a close relationship with author Herman Melville and inspired some of his writing.

In August 1850 Herman Melville vacationed in the Berkshires, intending to stay only a short time. He was then thirty-one, and owed much of his literary fame to the success of his first book, Typee (1846). After getting to know Sarah Morewood and Nathaniel Hawthorne during August, he abruptly decided to move his family to Pittsfield, Massachusetts, uprooting his young wife (Elizabeth Shaw Melville) from their home in Manhattan. In his haste to move, Melville "acted impulsively, and extravagantly, even recklessly," observed biographer Hershel Parker. In September 1850 Mrs. Morewood and her husband had bought the 250 acre farm in Pittsfield owned by Melville's uncle (the site of Melville's childhood fondness for the area), and in the same month Melville borrowed more money than he would ever be able to repay to buy the farm adjoining hers--Arrowhead (Herman Melville House).

Reviewing Michael Shelden's Melville in Love in The Kenyon Review, Mark Dunbar noted, "When Melville arrived in the rural, sequestered community in the summer of 1850, he immediately gained Sarah's affections. Combining her innate female warmth with a slightly affected appreciation for his novels (Omoo and Typee were at this point already critical successes, if not financial ones), she was irresistible to a man with a history of insecurities and anxieties."

As evidence of a romantic relationship between Melville and Morewood, Shelden's book cites passages in Melville's surviving letters to her (available at the Berkshire Athenaeum), including his descriptions of Sarah as "Thou Lady of All Delight"; "the ever-excellent & beautiful Lady of Paradise"; "Mrs. Morewood the goddess"; and "most considerate of all the delicate roses that diffuse their blessed perfume among men is Mrs. Morewood." Also cited are examples of their intimacy at parties, the gifts of books and bottles of Eau de Cologne that Morewood gave Melville, and their frequent outings in the countryside, including a summer night spent together in 1851 at the summit of Mount Greylock, the highest point in Massachusetts, where they were accompanied by a few friends, but not by their respective spouses." After this overnight adventure Sarah wrote that, as a woman openly violating the social norms of the times, she left the mountain feeling as defiant as "Lot's wife, casting many a lingering look behind." In the following weeks she and Melville grew closer as they explored the Berkshires together, strengthening the bond established by their shared experience on Greylock. In October 1851 she wrote, "Greylock is not forgotten here but often recalled in an amusing way—by Mr. Herman or myself—In some of our long walks we have taken a spyglass with us so as to bring nearer to us the Tower [where they had stayed overnight at the summit] and its associations."

The traditional reason given for Melville's sudden move to Pittsfield is that he wanted to be near his new friend Nathaniel Hawthorne, who lived six miles away in Lenox, Massachusetts. In Shelden's book, the claim is made that there was a more compelling reason—Melville's attraction to Sarah Morewood. Melville in Love points out that, whereas Hawthorne left the Berkshires in 1851, Melville continued to call the area home for thirteen years, not leaving until near the time of Sarah Morewood's death in 1863.

A Berkshire guidebook of 1919 identifies the fictional Elsie Venner's home with the main house of the Pittsfield Country Club, which was Sarah Morewood's mansion when Holmes knew her in the 1850s.

According to Shelden, the romance between Melville and Morewood was not entirely a secret in Pittsfield, especially in the case of their mutual friend, Oliver Wendell Holmes Sr., whose novel Elsie Venner (1861) was associated in Berkshire legend with Sarah Morewood. In Pittsfield, Sarah Morewood said, Elsie Venner "created a storm in many quarters."

The idea at the heart of Melville in Love is that Moby-Dick, which was largely written in the months following the novelist's move to the Berkshires, was inspired in part by Melville's passion for Sarah, an obsession that drove him to manic extremes in a manner similar to Ahab's pursuit of the whale. "How strong is Shelden's case? asked Michael Lindgren in The Washington Post. "Plausible, but not definitive."

Some critics see Sarah Morewood her as a figure unjustly overlooked by literary history. In the New York Journal of Books, Laura Schultz concluded, "Throughout his trials and tribulations, Melville was both inspired and sustained by the magnetic effervescence of Sarah Morewood." In the Library Journal Stefanie Hollmichel wrote, "Shelden carefully and convincingly presents his evidence regarding Morewood's influence and how she inspired Melville to a greatness recognized by few of his peers." In Booklist Donna Seaman observed, "Shelden presents the evidence gleaned through his assiduous research and performs a delving and convincing analysis of the sexual wellspring of Moby-Dick's violent energy and tragic majesty. Riveting in its incandescent sense of discovery, intimacy, and velocity, Shelden's bound-to-be-controversial anatomy of a clandestine love transforms our perception of Melville and introduces one of the great unsung figures in literary history."

== Civil War years and death ==
Sarah Morewood died of tuberculosis at her Pittsfield home ("Broadhall," now the Country Club of Pittsfield) on October 16, 1863, still married to John Rowland Morewood, and still on close terms with her neighbor Herman Melville. During the early years of the American Civil War she was so active and generous in her support of local regiments that two military camps were named after her. At her death the Pittsfield Sun, where some of her poems were published in the 1850s and early 1860s, praised her as "a lady of superior literary accomplishments." As Stanton Garner was the first to suggest, Melville may have adapted a phrase from one of Sarah's poems ("Eager for the battle's fate/And the aspect of the war.") for the title of his book of Civil War poems, Battle-Pieces and Aspects of the War (1866).

Shortly after Sarah's death, Caroline Whitmarsh paid tribute to her in the local press as a woman of great intelligence and sympathy, and she specifically mentioned her power to inspire "men of genius." Melville was one of those present when Sarah was buried in Pittsfield, and Oliver Wendell Holmes Sr. sent Sarah's family a poem written in her memory.

== Sources ==
- Garner, Stanton (1993). The Civil War World of Herman Melville. Lawrence: University Press of Kansas. ISBN 9780700606023
- Holmes, Oliver Wendell Sr. (1861). Elsie Venner: A Romance of Destiny. Boston: Ticknor and Fields.
- Melville in His Own Time: A Biographical Chronicle of His Life, Drawn from Recollections, Interviews, and Memoirs by Family, Friends, and Associates. (2015) Ed. Steven Olsen-Smith. Iowa City: Univ. of Iowa Press. ISBN 9781609383336
- Rogin, Michael (1983). Subversive Genealogy: The Politics and Art of Herman Melville. New York: Knopf. ISBN 9780307830944
- Parker, Hershel. (1996) Herman Melville: A Biography, 1819–1851. Baltimore: Johns Hopkins University Press. ISBN 9780801854286
- Parker, Hershel. (2002) Herman Melville: A Biography, 1851–1891. Baltimore: Johns Hopkins University Press. ISBN 9780801868924
- Shelden, Michael (2016). Melville in Love: The Secret Life of Herman Melville and the Muse of Moby-Dick. New York: Ecco/HarperCollins. ISBN 9780062418982
- Smith, J.E.A. (1895). The Poet Among the Hills: Oliver Wendell Holmes in Berkshire. Pittsfield: George Blatchford.
