= Mentoring Artists for Women's Art =

Mentoring Artists for Women's Art (MAWA) is a feminist visual arts education center based in Winnipeg, Manitoba. Created in 1984, this non-profit organization encourages and supports the intellectual and creative development of women in the visual arts by providing an ongoing forum for education and critical dialogue.

Monthly MAWA programming includes lectures, artist talks, skills-based workshops, professional practices workshops, critical reading groups, studio visits, an artist-mothers' group, screenings and field trips. Visiting artists and curators have included Lucy Lippard (Albuquerque, New Mexico), Deborah Kelly (Sydney, Australia), Sara Riel (Reykjavik, Iceland), Rosalie Favell (Ottawa), Allyson Mitchell (Toronto), Yolanda Paulsen (Mexico City) and Huma Mulji (Lahore, Pakistan). MAWA provides a platform for critical writing as well, by commissioning text that appears in their newsletter and on their website.

Although MAWA's mentorship programs are for women-identifying artists, recognizing historical and present-day inequalities, the majority of their programs are open to people of all genders, and are offered at low or no cost. MAWA has over 300 paid members, of whom approximately 80% reside in Winnipeg. An additional 10% are located throughout Manitoba and an additional 10% throughout the rest of Canada. Well over 350 volunteers contribute to MAWA each year.

== History ==
MAWA was founded as the Manitoba Artists for Women's Art. It was initiated by School of Art professor Diane Whitehouse, who was also on the Board of Plug In Gallery. She gathered together a working group including Sheila Butler, fine art students and others. They collaborated to create an organisation that addresses gender inequality in the visual arts by giving opportunities to women. It was created in response to the findings of a research committee based at Plug In Institute of Contemporary Art.

== Mentorship ==
MAWA works to sustain art in the community through mentorship programs. Senior women artists share their experience and expertise with developing women artists in a peer-support learning environment that supports them in building their studio and/or curatorial practices.

=== Foundation Mentorship Program ===
The Foundation Mentorship Program has been MAWA's core activity since 1985. It is a year-long program. It is designed to help women in the visual arts develop skills and define their decision-making philosophies, and to provide access to the information, resources and support they need to realize their artistic goals. In addition to a one-on-one relationship with a mentor, the program provides peer support for the mentees through group mentorship meetings.

=== Mentors and mentees ===
Mentors have included Sheila Butler, Aganetha Dyck, Diana Thorneycroft, Eleanor Bond, Bev Pike, Grace Nickel, Sigrid Dahle, Shawna Dempsey, and KC Adams. Former mentees have included Reva Stone, Laura Letinsky, Roewan Crowe and Dominique Rey.

== Exhibitions ==
- Grrls, Chicks, Sisters & Squaws: Les citoyennes du cyberspace (2006), curated by Skawennati Tricia Fragnito
- Resilience (2018), curated by Lee-Ann Martin

== Publications ==
- Culture of Community (2004)
- Technologies of Intuition (2006)
- Desire Change: Contemporary Feminist Art in Canada (2017)
