= Lakeview Square =

Mixed use development in Winnipeg, Canada

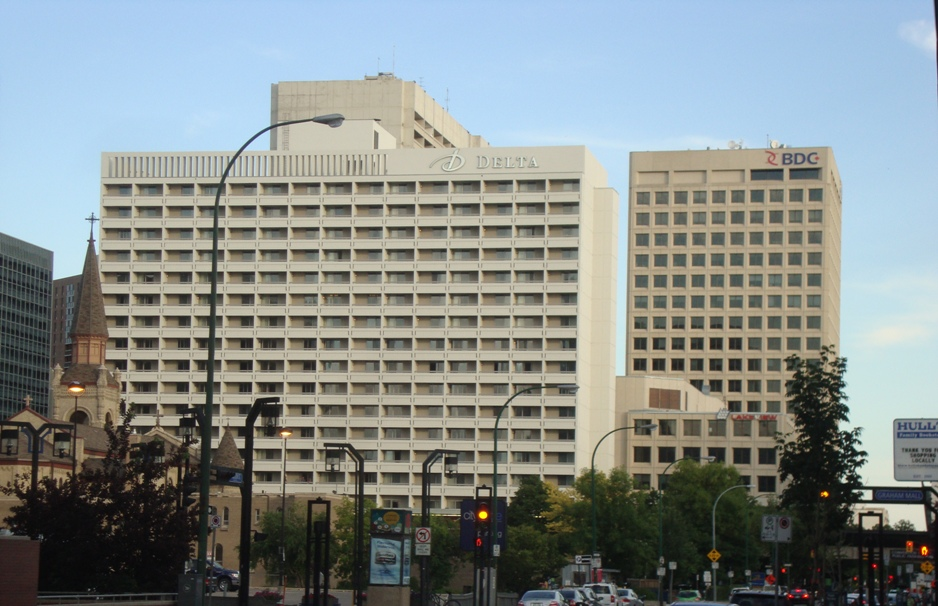
- The Lakeview Square development includes the Delta Hotel, two twin apartment buildings (left, behind hotel), and three office buildings along Carlton Street
- Interactive map of the Lakeview Square area

General information
- Architectural style: Brutalist
- Location: 155 Carlton St. 175 Carlton St. 185 Carlton St. 350 St. Mary Ave. 160 Hargrave St. 170 Hargrave St., Winnipeg, Canada
- Coordinates: 49°53′22″N 97°08′36″W
- Completed: 1974
- Owner: Lakeview Properties Ltd.

Technical details
- Floor area: 175 Carlton St. 553 square metres (5,950 ft^{2})

Design and construction
- Architecture firm: Libling Michener and Associates
- Developer: Lakeview Properties Ltd.
- Main contractor: Bird Construction Ltd.
- Known for: Japanese Hayashi garden

Lakeview Square is a full-block, mixed-use development in downtown Winnipeg, Manitoba, Canada. It opened in 1974 and was developed by Lakeview Properties, Ltd.

== History ==
Jack Levit of Lakeview Development Ltd. (St. James) announced in October 1969 that his company would invest CA$20 million in an apartment complex, as soon as Metro's Downtown Development Plan was passed into law.

The Delta Hotel, which faces St. Mary's Cathedral, was once the site of St. Mary's School, which closed in 1968 and burned in 1969.

In 2010, Lakeview Square was newly connected to the main Winnipeg Walkway system with the completion of a skyway from 330 Saint Mary Avenue to the Delta Hotel, utilizing a unique block-long exterior skyway running along the outside of the Delta on the Saint Mary Avenue side.

== Buildings ==
The complex consists of:

- Delta Hotel (St. Mary Ave) — originally a Holiday Inn and later a Crowne Plaza, is an 18-storey, 410-room hotel, with both indoor and outdoor swimming pools. Since its opening in January 1974, it has been the largest hotel in Winnipeg. The hotel has a full convention operation and a first-floor English pub, the Elephant & Castle. Originally the hotel had a discothèque, Uncle's, but this has since been replaced with a conference center.
- Holiday Towers (Hargrave St) — twin 27-storey apartment buildings, featuring approximately 500 apartments, whose residents have access not only to the apartments' own rooftop pool and running track but also to the pool and exercise facilities of the Delta Hotel.
- One Lakeview Square (155 Carlton Street) — on the corner of York, a 19-storey office building, designed by Libling Michener & Associates. On the first floor is a restaurant, originally the Garden Creperie, now the East India Pub & Brewing Company.
- Two and Three Lakeview Square (175-185 Carlton Street) — a connected low-rise structure with offices and first-floor retail, including a tobacco shop which has been present since the opening. In the basement of 185 Carlton is Ichi Ban Restaurant, a 650-square-metre (7,000 ft^{2}), 170-seat, bi-level teppanyaki steak house, which has been in the complex since its 1974 opening. The restaurant was designed by Nat Hart, who was previously an executive maitre d'hotel (head butler) of Caesar's Palace in Las Vegas. In its first quarter of operation, the Ichi Ban served comedian Jack Benny. The basement of 175 Carlton once contained an Italian restaurant with singing waiters, The Grand Canal of Venice, but this soon closed. The basement walkway still resembles a Venetian canal.
- Japanese Hayashi garden (Carlton Street) — a private park partially commemorating Winnipeg's sister-city relationship with Setagaya, Japan. The park was established not only to provide a unifying centre for the complex but also to replace a city park that was displaced by construction of Lakeview Square.

The buildings of the complex are connected via various walkways and also through a common underground parking garage. Lakeview Square is connected to the Winnipeg Convention Centre by two skyways, one connecting to the Delta and the other connecting to One Lakeview Square. The skyway connects to the original skyway to the Convention Centre and a 2-storey glass tower at the corner of Carlton Street and Saint Mary Avenue.

== See also ==
- Downtown Winnipeg
- Metropolitan Corporation of Greater Winnipeg
- Winnipeg Convention Centre
