= Roewan Crowe =

- Born: Saskatoon, Saskatchewan, Canada
- Occupations: Artist, Writer and scholar
- Writing career
- Notable work: Quivering Land
- Website: roewancrowe.com

Roewan Crowe is a Canadian feminist artist, writer, curator, and educator. In 2011 she was honoured for her social justice work in the arts by the Government of Manitoba as part of their celebration of Women in the Arts: Artists Working for Social Change. Her first book of poetry, Quivering Land, was published in 2013 by ARP Books. Roewan Crowe is currently an Associate Professor in the Women's and Gender Studies Department at the University of Winnipeg and Co-Director of The Institute for Women's & Gender Studies. Her creative and scholarly work explores queerness, class, violence, queer ecology, and what it means to be a settler. She lives and works in Winnipeg, Manitoba.

== Early life and education ==
Crowe was born to working class parents in Saskatoon, Saskatchewan, moving to Spruce Grove, Alberta in 1969. After completing an honours bachelor of arts degree at the University of Alberta, Crowe moved to Toronto to complete graduate studies in community psychology and arts-based research at the Ontario Institute for Studies in Education at the University of Toronto. After she completed her doctoral studies, she returned to the prairies.

== Art ==
Roewan Crowe creates work through the use of performance, installation, video, text, and theory, and her recent work creates intimate landscapes, making space for feelings, connection, and queer encounters. Noted work includes: stop-motion animation Queer Grit which has traveled to video and film festivals internationally; digShift (ongoing), a decolonizing and environmental reclamation project using site specific performance and multichannel installation to explore the shifting layers of an abandoned gas station; Lifting Stone, a queer femme performance/installation creating intimate poetic encounters; and My Monument, a multimedia exhibition with artists cam bush, Steven Leyden Cochrane and Paul Robles. That video uses Crowe's book Quivering Land to explore vanished feminist/queer/alternative cultural sites. Her longstanding community practice is concerned with creating space for and building engaged feminist/queer/artistic communities. In collaboration with Mentoring Artists for Women's Art (MAWA) in 2008, she curated Art Building Community, a project that saw the launch of ten new works and a weekend symposium.

== Writing ==
Crowe is the author of the book Quivering Land as well as scholarly articles and several chapbooks.

=== Quivering Land ===
Quivering Land is a queer Western, engaging with poetics and politics to reckon with the legacies of violence and colonization in the West. Reviews of Quivering Land include: Herizons: Women's News and Feminist Views, and Canadian Women in Literary Arts, an inclusive national literary organization.

=== Selected scholarly articles ===
Roewan Crowe is particularly interested in exploring, and writing about, artistic practitioner knowledges and artistic processes. In 2014, with collaborator Michelle Meagher, she published the article, "Letting Something Else Happen: A Collaborative Encounter with the Work of Sharon Rosenberg."

Other scholarly writing includes: "So You Want our Ghetto Stories: Oral History at Ndinawe Youth Resource Centre" with Robin Jarvis Brownlie. Remembering Mass Violence: Oral History, New Media and Performance, S. High, E. Little, Thi Ry Duong (eds). Toronto: University of Toronto Press, 2014, pp 203–217.

"Slow Art in a Time of Flash Floods: What's a Queer Feminist Settler To Do?" Multimedia essay, Studio XX Electronic Review, .dpi, Issue No. 25, "Inevitable Transitions," 2013.

"digShift: a Queer Reclamation of the Imagined West," Multimedia essay, No More Potlucks: Online Journal of Contemporary Arts, "Wound," Issue 7, Jan. 2010.

"Feminist Encounters with the Hollywood Western." T. M. Chen, D. S. Churchill (eds). London and New York: Routledge Press, 2007, pp 113–130.

"Crafting Tales of Trauma: Will this Winged Monster Fly?" Provoked by Art: Theorizing Arts-informed Inquiry, L. Neilsen, J. G. Knowles, & A. L. Cole (editors). Halifax: Backalong Books, 2004, pp 123–132.

"Angelic Artful Encounters." Journal of Curriculum Theorizing Special Issue: Performances in Arts-Based Inquiry, Mullen, C. A. & Diamond, P., Spring 2001, pp 81–94.

"She Offers Fragments." The Art of Writing Inquiry, L. Neilsen, J. G. Knowles, & A. L Cole, editors, Backalong Books, 2001, pp 125–131.
