= Bev Pike =

Canadian artist

Bev Pike is a Winnipeg-based visual artist who paints large (2.5 x 6.1 m/8 x 20 ft) cinematic baroque landforms. Grottesque, her current work on climate catastrophe, is a series of interconnected underground sanctuaries based on seventeenth century English shell grottos. Pike also has created video art and publishes artist books as well as opinion pieces for CBC, MSN, and the Winnipeg Free Press, Globe & Mail among others.

== Education ==
Bev Pike graduated from the Alberta College of Art and Design and took post-graduate studies in fine art at the University of Alberta.

== Career ==
Pike's Grottesque series of paintings, which the Dunlop Art Gallery in Regina circulated nationally in 2018. In this series, Pike explores playful and sardonic dystopian refuges using monumental scale and fragile glazes.

In the publication for the 2018–2020 Canadian tour, the Dunlop Art Gallery's Assistant Curator Blair Fornwald analysed the gouaches on paper: "...lumpen bezoars of bedclothes, knitwear, yarn, and fabric coalesce into compositions resembling quasi-landscapes, details from domestic spaces, and the cavernous fleshy interiors of the body." Museum London's Curator/Director Cassandra Getty wrote in their publication, "Evocative titles like Cavernous Sun Parlour, Buried Dance Pavilion, and Subterranean Day Spa suggest that these spaces comprise the leisure sites of a new underground civilization." In her June 2018 Border Crossings review, Sandee Moore called this work "...a tour de force of demented whimsy..."

Curator Mary Reid, described the earlier Hysteria Chronicles paintings as, "mountainous bundles of clothing...creating a visual topography of overlapping social histories and constructions of gender."

Of the 1990 solo show at the Winnipeg Art Gallery, Curator Shirley Madill posited Pike's Boudoir Series as a "...balance on the threshold between reality and the inner space of dreams...to imbue everyday reality with poetry, magic and doubt."

Pike's paintings have shown extensively at large public galleries and artist-run centres across Canada. Pike has received senior level grants from Canada Council, the Winnipeg Arts Council and the Manitoba Arts Council, including several prestigious Major Arts Awards. In addition, her paintings and artist-books are in public collections in Canada, the UK (Tate Britain, and the Victoria & Albert Museum) and the US (National Museum of Women in the Arts) among others).

As a feminist activist and cultural advocate, Bev Pike has lectured at universities and colleges across Canada. She has been on many boards and action committees, as well as a mentor at Mentoring Artists for Women's Art and is a founding member of the Wendy Wersch Memorial Lecture Series.

In 2021, Herizons magazine published Pike's research into 1975's Woman as Viewer protest exhibition at the Winnipeg Art Gallery for International Women's Year. The Winnipeg Free Press followed up with a feature on Pike's talk on this for a March 2021 First Friday in the Exchange District.

Pike also has created video art and publishes artist's books as well as opinion pieces for CBC, MSN, the Winnipeg Free Press among others. Her papers are at the Archives of Manitoba and Artexte. For her leadership of a 2001–2002 community action to protect the mandate of Mentoring Artists for Women's Art (MAWA) to develop professional skills in women, see both Pike's and MAWA's fonds at the Archives of Manitoba.

== Publications ==
Autobiography of an Eccentric Line (2001) shows a neurodivergent gene pool.

Swallowing Safety Pins (2007) is an epistolary history of romance.

Agony Aunt's Cavalcade of Mysteries (2017) compares circus acts to relationships.

Her videotapes, distributed by Video Pool Media Arts Centre, include Agony Aunt Tarot (2015) about organising women and Suffragette Sight Gags (2004) satirizing collective action.
