= Michael Shelden =

American biographer and teacher

Michael Shelden (born 1951) is an American biographer and teacher, notable for his authorized biography of George Orwell, his history of Cyril Connolly's Horizon magazine, his controversial biography of Graham Greene, and his study of the last years of Mark Twain, Man in White. In March 2013 his Young Titan: The Making of Winston Churchill was published. In 2016 his biography of Herman Melville, Melville in Love, was published by Ecco/HarperCollins.

== Education and early career ==
Sheldon was born in Oklahoma and graduated from Omaha Benson High School, Omaha, Nebraska. He earned a Bachelor of Arts in 1973 from the University of Nebraska Omaha, a Master of Arts in 1975 from Indiana University Bloomington and a Ph.D. in English in 1979 also from Indiana University Bloomington. He then began teaching at Indiana State University, where he was promoted to professor of English in 1989. For ten years, he was a fiction critic for The Baltimore Sun, and from 1995 to 2007 he was a features writer for The Daily Telegraph of London. He currently is a Research Professor at Purdue University's English Department.Shelden is married and the father of two daughters.

== Books ==
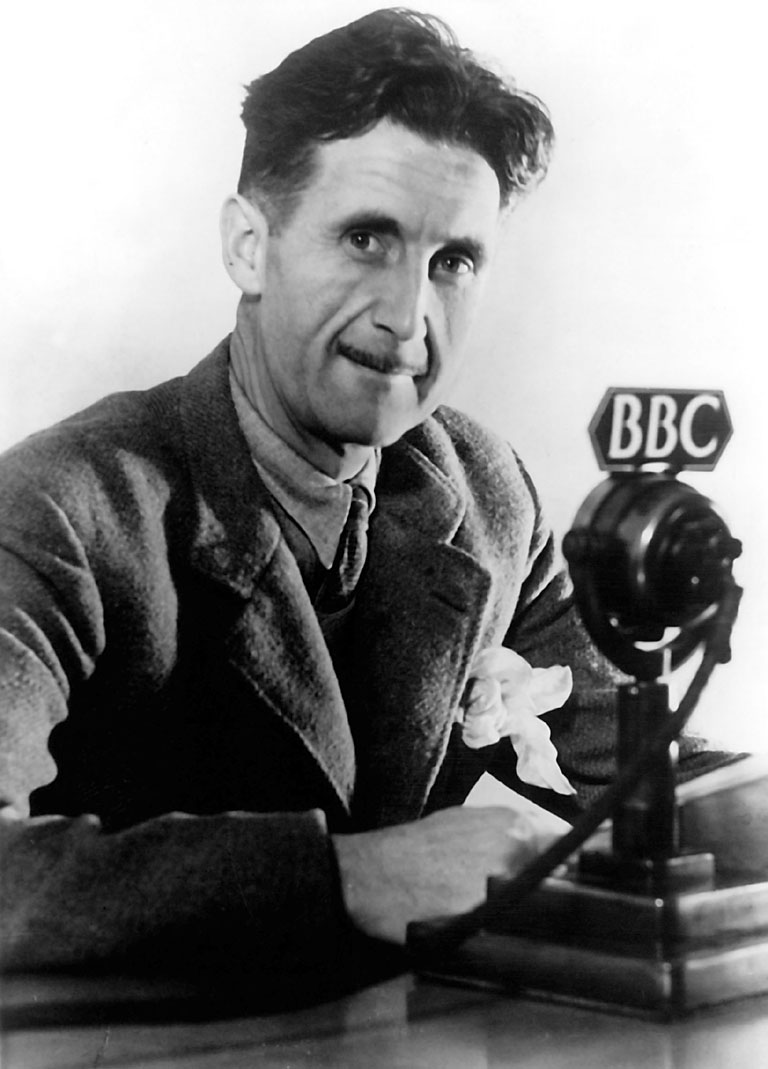
Shelden's biography of George Orwell was a finalist for the Pulitzer Prize in Biography.

Shelden's first book, George Orwell: Ten Animal Farm Letters to His Agent, Leonard Moore (1984), was an edited collection drawn from letters between Orwell and Moore that Shelden found at the Lilly Library and was the first to publicize. In 1989 he published his literary history Friends of Promise: Cyril Connolly and the World of Horizon, which covered the decade of the 1940s when Horizon was the most influential literary magazine in the United Kingdom. The book was based on a large collection of Connolly's personal papers at the University of Tulsa, and on interviews with the magazine's former editors and assistants, including Stephen Spender.

Authorized by the George Orwell estate, Shelden's biography of Orwell was published in 1991 and was a finalist for the Pulitzer Prize in Biography. Among other things, the book included the first detailed account of Orwell's controversial list of people whom he considered politically dishonest and unreliable in British society. However, Daphne Patai, in her 1984 book The Orwell Mystique: A Study in Male Ideology, described and discussed this list, which she had come across in the Orwell Archive in London.

Shelden's biography of Graham Greene appeared in a UK edition in 1994 under the title Graham Greene; The Man Within. In 1995 it was published in America, with revisions, as Graham Greene: The Enemy Within. Its "despoiling" portrait of Greene as a driven and devious artist provoked heated debate on both sides of the Atlantic. In The New York Review of Books there was an especially spirited debate between Shelden and novelist David Lodge on the question of Greene's anti-Semitism, with Shelden arguing that Greene's published remarks about Jews are "worse than anything in T. S. Eliot or Evelyn Waugh", and Lodge countering that although Greene drew "on social and cultural prejudices and stereotypes concerning Jews which were common in English society before World War II . . . to label it as anti-Semitic ridicule is crudely reductive."

Shelden is the author of Graham Greene's entry in the Oxford Dictionary of National Biography (ODNB).

In Mark Twain: Man in White (2010) Shelden wrote about the last four years of Twain's life (1906–1910). The biography portrayed Twain as a vibrant figure who worked hard in old age to promote his image as a great popular entertainer, and to boost his reputation as a serious social critic and literary artist.

In 2013 Shelden released a biography of Winston Churchill entitled Young Titan.

Shelden's Melville in Love tells the story of Herman Melville's relationship with Sarah Morewood in the 1850s, especially during the period when Melville was writing Moby-Dick.

== Audio lectures ==
In 2011, Recorded Books released Shelden's The Lost Generation: American Writers in Paris in the 1920s. This audio collection of lectures deals mainly with Ernest Hemingway and F. Scott Fitzgerald, but also covers Gertrude Stein, Ezra Pound, T. S. Eliot, and many other authors.

== Bibliography ==
- George Orwell: Ten Animal Farm Letters to His Agent, Leonard Moore (1984)
- Friends of Promise: Cyril Connolly and the World of Horizon (United Kingdom edition: Hamish Hamilton, 1989) ISBN 978-0-571-24915-2 (United States edition: HarperCollins, 1989) ISBN 978-0-06-092001-2
- Orwell: The Authorized Biography (United Kingdom edition: Heinemann, 1991) ISBN 978-1-84275-173-2 (US edition: HarperCollins, 1991) ISBN 978-0-06-092161-3
- Graham Greene: The Man Within (United Kingdom edition: Heinemann, 1994) ISBN 978-0-7493-9848-4
- Graham Greene: The Enemy Within (United States edition: Random House, 1995) ISBN 978-0-679-42883-1
- Mark Twain: Man in White, The Grand Adventure of His Final Years (Random House, 2010) ISBN 978-0-679-44800-6
- Young Titan: The Making of Winston Churchill (Simon & Schuster, 2013) ISBN 978-1-451-60991-2
- Melville in Love: The Secret Life of Herman Melville and the Muse of Moby-Dick (Ecco/HarperCollins, 2016) ISBN 978-0-062-41898-2
