= Diane Whitehouse =

Canadian painter, professor and art activist

Diane Whitehouse (born in Birmingham, England) is a Canadian painter, professor and art activist.

== Education ==
In 1962, Whitehouse earned her NDD at the Birmingham College of Art, and in the 1980s did post-graduate work at Bergen Kunsthåndverkskole, Norway.

She became a Canadian citizen in 1972.

== Paintings ==
"Diane Whitehouse creates strong, vibrant, rich and evocative canvasses that emanate from the prairie landscape, its distances, light, space, colour and horizons."

Whitehouse's paintings have been described as meditative, and referencing landscape.

Whitehouse began exhibiting her work in 1962, including at the Canada House in London, UK, University of Alberta, Nova Scotia College of Art and Design, The Banff Centre, and The University of Manitoba.

In 1982, she had a solo exhibition in the Manitoba Studio Series at the Winnipeg Art Gallery, entitled The Passing of an Emperor.

In 1984, her Rooms Journeys solo show was at Plug In Gallery in Winnipeg.

In 1986, her solo exhibition Rooms and Other Walled Spaces was held at the University of Manitoba’s Gallery 1.1.1.

In 1990, her solo show entitled Diane Whitehouse: Paintings was hosted by the Art Gallery of Southwestern Manitoba, in Brandon.

In 1999, Whitehouse’s work was in a major solo retrospective at the Winnipeg Art Gallery. In that catalogue, Cliff Eyland wrote, "A Diane Whitehouse work can be imagined as a record of a silent private performance, of stopping and starting, of looking and adjusting." Shirley Madill, Senior Curator at the Art Gallery of Hamilton, wrote of that work, "A visit to the studio of Diane Whitehouse is an experience of sheer exhilaration."

Group shows include The Painters’ Newfoundland at the Art Gallery of Newfoundland and Labrador (1998), BOUNCE> Rotterdam organised by the St. Norbert Arts and Cultural Centre (1996), Off The Beaten Track, shown at Collective Gallery, Edinburgh as well as Sea Gate Gallery in Dundee (1989), in the Contemporary Art in Manitoba show at the Winnipeg Art Gallery (1987) and many others.

Her large paintings are in many international collections including in England and Norway, and in Canada: the Canada Council Art Bank, the Manitoba Arts Council Art Bank, Alberta Government House, and Winnipeg Art Gallery.

== Career ==
Whitehouse has based her career in Winnipeg, Manitoba, Canada, since relocating in 1977 from Edmonton, Alberta, to teach fine art at the University of Manitoba School of Art rising to Professorial rank. Before that, she taught painting in the Fine Arts Department of the University of Alberta in Edmonton, Alberta. She has also taught at the Banff Centre and the Nova Scotia College of Art and Design in Halifax.

From 1975 to 1977, she served on the Alberta Art Foundation Advisory Committee in Edmonton.

In 1983, Whitehouse created a committee of professors and students to establish Mentoring Artists for Women's Art. In 2004, Whitehouse was featured in MAWA: Culture of Community, a book celebrating the 30th anniversary of the group she founded.

From 1984 to 1988, she served on the Canada Council Advisory Committee. Whitehouse served as chair of the Board of Winnipeg's founding artist-run centre Plug In Gallery twice.

Whitehouse was featured in the April 1991 issue of Border Crossings magazine.

In 1995, she co-founded <Site> Gallery, a commercially-oriented artist-run centre in Winnipeg's National Historic Site, The Exchange District.

Between 2004 and 2019, Whitehouse established an independent annual artists' retreat in Riding Mountain National Park. In those years, she also taught at the annual Arts West residency there.

== Awards ==
In 2011, for her extensive fostering of the Canadian art scene, Whitehouse received the Making A Difference Award at the Winnipeg Arts Council's annual Mayor's Luncheon for the Arts.
