= Albos =

Albos may refer to:

- David Albós Cavaliere (b. 1984), Andorran ski mountaineer, and road racing cyclist
- Joan Albós Cavaliere (b. 1980), Andorran ski mountaineer
- Ludovic Albós Cavaliere (b. 1979), Andorran ski mountaineer

== See also ==
- Albo (disambiguation)
