= Jack Levit =

Canadian real estate developer (1927–2014)

Jack Levit (June 28, 1927 – November 13, 2014) was the CEO of Lakeview Management Inc., a real-estate development and management company in Winnipeg, Manitoba, Canada. The Lakeview companies own and/or manage over 50 hotel properties in Canada and the United States.

Levit built the first phase of the Winnipeg Walkway between Lakeview Square and the Winnipeg Convention Centre. Today, the city has continued this skywalk system to connect much of downtown Winnipeg.

== Early life ==
Jack Levit was born on 28 June 1927 as the son of William Levit, an Eastern-European Jewish businessman. William, like many others of Jewish heritage in Europe in the early part of the 20th century, fled from Europe during a period of anti-Semitism and moved to the Canadian Prairies in 1921. A commercial artist by trade, William formed the Levit Sign Co., which became the largest neon sign business in Canada. Gaining business experience from working with his father in the company, Jack eventually became a successful entrepreneur and corporate executive of his own, largely as a result of a number of financial decisions.

Jack extended the family sign business into a property development and management company under the names of Lakeview Development Inc. and Lakeview Hotel Management Inc.

== Career ==
=== Levit Sign Company ===
In 1964, Levit sold the Levit Sign Company for C$600,000 (approximately $4 million today). He built two industrial buildings for his family sign business, both of which were funded from profits realized in the sign business.

While in the sign business, Levit had to approach land owners for permission him to erect signs on their property. In the process, he frequently had to agree that if the land where the sign was eventually sold, his sign would have to come down. He constructed a number of warehouses in a then underdeveloped, peripheral area of the city—the St. James Street area, which now is a retail area of Winnipeg. The land that he proposed developing was not for sale, but was vacant. Unable to purchase the property outright, he negotiated a 50-year lease on the property.

The original St. James development project was funded by a mortgage and three partners, each holding a 25% interest. The project called for Levit to receive a 10% development fee that would constitute his 25% equity. He used the $600,000 profit from the sale of the family business as security for bank loans required to sustain the project's development. The project was developed under the corporate name, "Lakeview."

Lakeview developed the initial warehouses with the intention of adding them to the company's management portfolio. The warehouses proved successful and the rents from the units allowed Levit to pay the company's ongoing overhead while continuing to focus on subsequent developments. Throughout Levit's career, he decided to sell certain properties and continue to manage other if he believed they made sense financially to keep within Lakeview's real estate portfolio. As a result, Lakeview evolved into both a development company and a property management company. The development business was the more profitable one.

=== The Courts of St. James ===
Shortly after his warehouse development was completed, he developed a three high-rise apartment complex containing 756 apartments, a shopping centre with multiple retail outlets and Canada's first tunnel system that linked the units of the complex. The project was called The Courts of St. James.

In order to acquire the land, he had to persuade dozens of individual land-owners to sell their property to him. In order to finance the project, Levit approached several potential lenders and eventually secured financing from Confederation Life, a Canadian insurance company headquartered in Toronto. Confederation Life agreed to finance the project with a C$16,000,000 mortgage and agreed to pay Lakeview a C$50,000 development fee for each building and providing Lakeview with a 50% ownership stake after the mortgage was retired. Levit later acquired of all the individual residential properties on the city block. A few years after the project was completed, the Canadian Government imposed regulatory restrictions on the ability of Life Insurance companies to be involved in private equity projects. Confederation Life subsequently bought all of Lakeview's ownership stake in the project, converting Levit's equity to cash.

=== Lakeview Square ===
After his deal with Confederation Life, Levit began working on a new project, the Lakeview Square development in Downtown Winnipeg. This comprised two large office towers, two 27-story apartment buildings, a four-star hotel and an underground parkade. The anchor tenant to the 400-room hotel was to be a Holiday Inn; the two apartment towers included 500 apartments, and the courtyard to be developed in the centre of the building complex included a conversion of the existing Japanese-themed park to a Japanese Hyashi garden. To finance this deal, Holiday Inn arranged a mortgage. The zoning regulations were waived following his agreement with the City of Winnipeg that he would build a Skywalk to connect office buildings, apartments and hotels to the new Winnipeg Convention Centre.

=== Grand Winnipeg Airport Hotel ===
Levit was also responsible for developing the Grand Winnipeg Airport Hotel, which is the only hotel across from Winnipeg's Richardson International Airport.
