= Andrew Strempler =

Canadian businessman

Andrew Strempler is former president and chief executive officer of Mediplan Health Consulting Inc., and RxNorth.com, which he founded in 1999. In June 2012, he was arrested in Florida on multiple charges relating to the sale of foreign and counterfeit pharmaceuticals. In October 2012, he pleaded guilty to conspiracy to commit mail fraud in connection with his role as owner and president of Mediplan Health Consulting Inc., a Canadian company, that also operated under the name RxNorth.com. He was sentenced to four years in a U.S. prison, ordered to pay a forfeiture of US$300,000 and a $25,000 fine.

Strempler's company, RxNorth.com, was found by the US Food and Drug Administration to be selling counterfeit medicines to customers in the United States. In 2010, Strempler was stripped of his license to practice as a pharmacist in Manitoba for dealing in unapproved medicines, and had left Canada to "an island off the coast of Venezuela," where the 'Winnipeg Free Press' located him "distributing generic drugs from an online pharmaceutical business."

Strempler helped establish the Canadian International Pharmacy Association in November 2002. His company, RxNorth.com, was sold in part in 2007 to the CanadaDrugs.com group of companies; the effective date of change for service provided to customers was January 31, 2008. He also helped form the Manitoba Internet Pharmacists Association in 2003 and sat as vice chairman on the board of directors for the Manitoba Chamber of Commerce.

He holds a bachelor's degree in pharmacy from the University of Manitoba. He grew up in Winnipeg, Manitoba.

Strempler spent most of his prison time in a privately owned prison in the state of Georgia. He was transferred to a minimum-security prison in Manitoba in July 2015, and was released in October 2015.
