= Mindel C. Sheps =

Canadian physician, biostatistician, and demographer (1913–1973)

Mindel Cherniack Sheps
- Sheps at UNC-Chapel Hill c. 1968
- Born: 20 May 1913; Winnipeg, Manitoba, Canada
- Died: 13 January 1973 (aged 59); Durham, North Carolina, U.S.
- Education: University of Manitoba (MD), UNC Chapel Hill (MPH)
- Spouse: Cecil George Sheps (m. 1937)
- Scientific career
- Fields: Medicine, Biostatistics, Epidemiology, Demography
- Workplaces: Simmons College, Harvard Medical School, University of Pittsburgh, Columbia University, UNC Chapel Hill

Mindel Cherniack Sheps (May 20, 1913 – January 13, 1973) was a Canadian physician, biostatistician and demographer. She held academic appointments at Harvard Medical School, University of Pittsburgh, Columbia University and UNC Chapel Hill, where she was Professor of Biostatistics.

== Biography ==
Sheps was born in Winnipeg, Manitoba in 1913. Her parents, Joseph and Fanya (Golden) Cherniack, were immigrants from southern Russia, and her brother, Saul Cherniack, became minister of finance in the Manitoba provincial government in the early 1970s. She married Cecil George Sheps in 1937.

After obtaining her medical degree at the University of Manitoba in 1936, she went into general practice from 1939 to 1944 and ran successfully for the Winnipeg School Board in 1942. From 1944 to 1946, she was secretary to the health services planning commission of the government of Saskatchewan. In that position, Sheps was a key contributor to the Sigerist Report, which led to Saskatchewan enacting the first government hospital insurance plan in North America in 1945.

Later on, after moving to Chapel Hill, North Carolina, she began to study biostatistics and held faculty positions at several universities before returning to UNC-Chapelel Hill in 1968, where she remained until she died in 1973. In addition to her academic career, she served as an adviser to the Government of India through the Ford Foundation and held an advisory role at World Health Organization.

The Mindel C. Sheps Award, a collaborative project of the Population Association of America (PAA) and the University of North Carolina School of Public Health, is awarded every two years to honor exceptional achievements in mathematical demography or demographic methodology to candidates who demonstrate exemplary professional ethics and standards.

== Research ==
Sheps' work has had a significant influence on several academic fields. In epidemiology and biostatistics, Sheps' 1958 paper "Shall we count the living or the dead" contains one of the earliest discussions of challenges that arise from the asymmetry of the relative risk, a phenomenon that may make the effect estimate sensitive to whether it is based on the probability of the outcome, or the probability of not having the outcome.

She devoted the last ten years of her life primarily to demography, a field in which she was largely self-taught. Her work in demography was among the first to study the determinants of variation in family formation. The Mindel C. Sheps award in mathematical demography is named in her honor.

== Selected publications ==
- Sheps, M.C. (1958): "Shall we count the living or the dead?". New England Journal of Medicine 259:1210-1214.
- Sheps, M.C., and Menken, J. A. "Mathematical Models of Conception and Birth". Chicago: University of Chicago Press, 1973.
