= Lindsay Shearer-Nelko =

Lindsay Shearer-Nelko (born April 10, 1986 in Winnipeg) is a Canadian-born choreographer of such television shows as FOX's 'So You Think You Can Dance' (Season 10) and 'The X Factor' (associate choreographer).

== Early life ==
Shearer-Nelko, born in Winnipeg, Manitoba, went to high school in that city while training at her mother’s dance studio, Shelley Shearer School of Dance. She achieved her ISTD advanced ballet certification from the Imperial Society of Teachers of Dancing and then completed the CAP 21 - Drama Department Musical Theater Program at New York University’s Tisch School of the Arts. She then completed Performance for Camera and Dance programs at the University of California, Los Angeles.

== Career ==
Shearer-Nelko developed a style that Dance Informa digital magazine has said to be "a unique fusion of ballet, modern and jazz techniques that is diverse and theatrical." She began bringing her students to the PULSE on Tour Dance Convention and eventually was asked to choreograph opening and closing numbers for the company's shows. At this time she met her mentors, Brian Friedman, Desmond Richardson and Cris Judd.

== Choreography ==
She was selected to be a choreographer on Season 10 of FOX's "So You Think You Can Dance"; executive producer Nigel Lythgoe called her "a true asset to this program". Additionally, she was an associate choreographer on FOX's "The X Factor" and of the NBCUniversal feature film An American Girl: Saige Paints the Sky. In January 2014, Shearer-Nelko choreographed "Royal Wedding" in Dubai, a Design Lab & Zixi Inc. live event directed by Amy Tinkham. She has workshopped her new pieces with dancers from Canada’s Royal Winnipeg Ballet. She has also choreographed and co-creatively conceptualized the 2014 music video "Get Out Alive" for Canadian artist Sheena Grobb of Red Shoe Music Inc. Shearer-Nelko was the second runner-up in the Capezio Dance Awards in 2013, and as a result she choreographed, directed and co-produced her own show at the Alvin Ailey American Dance Theater in 2014. She choreographed the opening ceremonies for the Canadian Human Museum of Human Rights in September 2014, and she won second place at the Annual McCallum Choreography Festival in Palm Desert, California, where her pieces were performed by dancers from the Smuin Ballet of San Francisco.

== Awards ==
Shearer-Nelko won the 17th Annual McCallum Theatre Choreography Festival Award as the Top Choreographer Finalist 2014 for Division 1, and from there, she was awarded Second Place Grand Prize. She was second runner-up in the Capezio A.C.E Awards 2013 in New York City for the Top Choreographer Finalist /Awards of Choreographic Excellence.
