= Kuzhali Manickavel =

Indian writer

Kuzhali Manickavel (Tamil: குழலி மாணிக்கவேல்) is an Indian writer who writes in English. She was born in Winnipeg, Manitoba, Canada and moved to Chidambaram, Tamil Nadu, India when she was thirteen. She currently lives in Bengaluru, Karnataka. Her first book, Insects Are Just Like You And Me Except Some Of Them Have Wings was published by Blaft Publications in 2008. The Guardian named the book as one of the best independently published ebooks in the weird fiction genre, calling it "just very, very beautiful." Her second collection, Things We Found During the Autopsy, was also published by Blaft in 2014. Both collections were listed in India Today's A Decade in Books as "...whimsical, maddening and in some places, intensely beautiful."

== Bibliography ==
- Insects Are Just Like You And Me Except Some Of Them Have Wings (Blaft Publications, 2008)
- Eating Sugar, Telling Lies (Blaft Publications, 2011)
- Things We Found During the Autopsy (Blaft Publications, 2014)
- The Lucy Temerlin Institute for Broken Shapeshifters' Guide to Starving Boys- Their Salient Features, How to find Them, How to Care For Them After They Die and Four Case Studies (Blaft's Monographs on Cryptodiversity and Decoherence series, Blaft Publications 2019)
- How to Love Mathematical Objects (Blaft's Monographs on Cryptodiversity and Decoherence series, Blaft Publications 2020)
- A Compendium of Supernatural Entities Found in the Government Girls Higher Secondary School (Angry Robot Books 2026)
