= The Royal Art Lodge =

- Formation: 1996
- Founded at: Winnipeg, Manitoba, Canada
- Dissolved: 2008
- Type: Contemporary art

The Royal Art Lodge was a collaborative group of artists based in Winnipeg, Manitoba, Canada, founded in 1996 by Michael Dumontier, Marcel Dzama, Neil Farber, Drue Langlois, Jon Pylypchuk, and Adrian Williams at the University of Manitoba. Hollie Dzama and Myles Langlois also worked with the group. In the last few years, only three of the original members remained, including Michael Dumontier, Marcel Dzama, and Neil Farber. The majority of the work produced by The Royal Art Lodge were small-scale drawings and paintings which often incorporated text. The group met for several years once a week to do many drawings each evening. Generally, at least three of the members contribute to each piece of work in a spontaneous response to the previous artist's work on the page before stamp-dating the work. After a piece was deemed complete, the group then sorted and date stamped them. The work has been exhibited internationally including in England, Spain, Italy and France. The group became a launching pad for the solo careers of many of its members.

After the group disbanded in 2008, Michael Dumontier and Neil Farber continue to collaborate on works in a similar fashion.
