= Herizons =

Canadian feminist magazine

- Managing Editor: Penni Mitchell
- Categories: Women's rights, Feminism, Women
- Frequency: Quarterly
- Circulation: 11,000
- Founded: 1979
- Country: Canada
- Based in: Winnipeg, Manitoba
- Website: herizons.ca
- ISSN: 0711-7485
- OCLC: 679778553

Herizons is a Canadian feminist magazine published in Winnipeg, Manitoba and distributed to subscribers throughout Canada. Billed as "Canada's answer to Ms. magazine," it is also sold on newsstands.

== History ==
Founded in 1979 as a volunteer feminist newspaper, The Manitoba Women's Newspaper, Herizons switched to a magazine format in 1983, under the directorship of managing editor Deborah Holmberg Schwartz. It then expanded into the national Canadian market in 1985. Herizons published monthly until 1987, then ceased publishing until 1992, when its doors were re-opened by two former staff.

== Content ==
Published quarterly, Herizons focuses on the strides being made towards women's equality in Canada and around the world. The magazine profiles leading feminist activists, artists and agitators, and highlights the efforts of organizations working to change public policy issues. Herizons' topics of interest include women in politics, gender discrimination, legal cases affecting gender equality, feminist social justice issues, women's health, the environment, popular culture and the arts.

The magazine publishes bite-sized snippets called "nelliegrams" that note advancements made towards women's equality, as well as relevant book, film and music reviews. Herizons interviews notable Canadian female musicians and performers and publishes essays on timely feminist issues.

== Contributors ==
Herizons contributors include noted feminists authors, artists, feminist activists, academic writers. They include Michele Landsberg, Susan G. Cole, Cindy Filipenko, Judy Rebick, Shawna Dempsey. Since 1992, Herizons managing editor has been Penni Mitchell. The non profit organization is overseen by a volunteer board of directors.
