= Ruth Collie =

- Born: November 1888; Cambridge, England
- Died: March 6, 1936 (aged 47); London, England
- Occupation: Poet
- Spouse(s): Elisha Arakie Cohen (m. 1908–1919); Frank Lang Collie (m. 1924–1936)
- Children: 1
- Writing career
- Pen name: Sheila Rand; Wilhelmina Stitch
- Period: 20th century
- Genre: Poetry

Ruth Collie, née Ruth Jacobs, (November 1888 – March 6, 1936) was an English-born poet who started her writing career in Winnipeg, Manitoba. She was also known under her pen names Wilhelmina Stitch and Sheila Rand.

== Biography ==
Ruth Jacobs was born in Cambridge, England. She was the oldest of three children born to her parents who worked as a bookseller and an accountant. Her grandfather was Marcus Hast, a Hebrew composer who spent 40 years as rabbi at the Great Synagogue of London. In 1908, her soon-to-be husband Elisha Arakie Cohen, travelled to England where he met and married Jacobs. They returned to Winnipeg, Manitoba where her husband worked as a lawyer for the firm Daly, Crichton and McClure. In 1910, a son named Ralph was born.

In 1913, she began writing book reviews for the Winnipeg Telegram under the pen name Sheila Rand. In 1917, she was hired as an editor and regularly published poems and short stories. In January 1919, the Telegram was in financial trouble and she was recruited by the Winnipeg Tribune where she started to write a column called "What to Read... and What Not." The column included book reviews and poems written by herself. After her husband died in March 1919, she began working at Eaton's, writing advertising copy for their catalogues. She continued to write for the Tribune and also became literary editor of Western Home Monthly. She was also elected vice-president of the Canadian Authors' Association which led to regular speaking engagements. In 1922, she signed a deal to publish her poetry in several North American newspapers. She began to write under a new pen name, Wilhelmina Stitch.

In 1923, she moved back to England in order to further her son's education. He would later become a noted professor of economics. In 1924, she married Frank Collie, a physician from Scotland. She resumed her writing career and submitted poetry to the London Daily Graphic. Her daily poetry earned her the nickname, "the poem a day lady." Her poetry made her name well known and she was regularly called on to speak for community groups. In 1930, she went on a two-month speaking tour of North America where she spoke every day for 50 days.

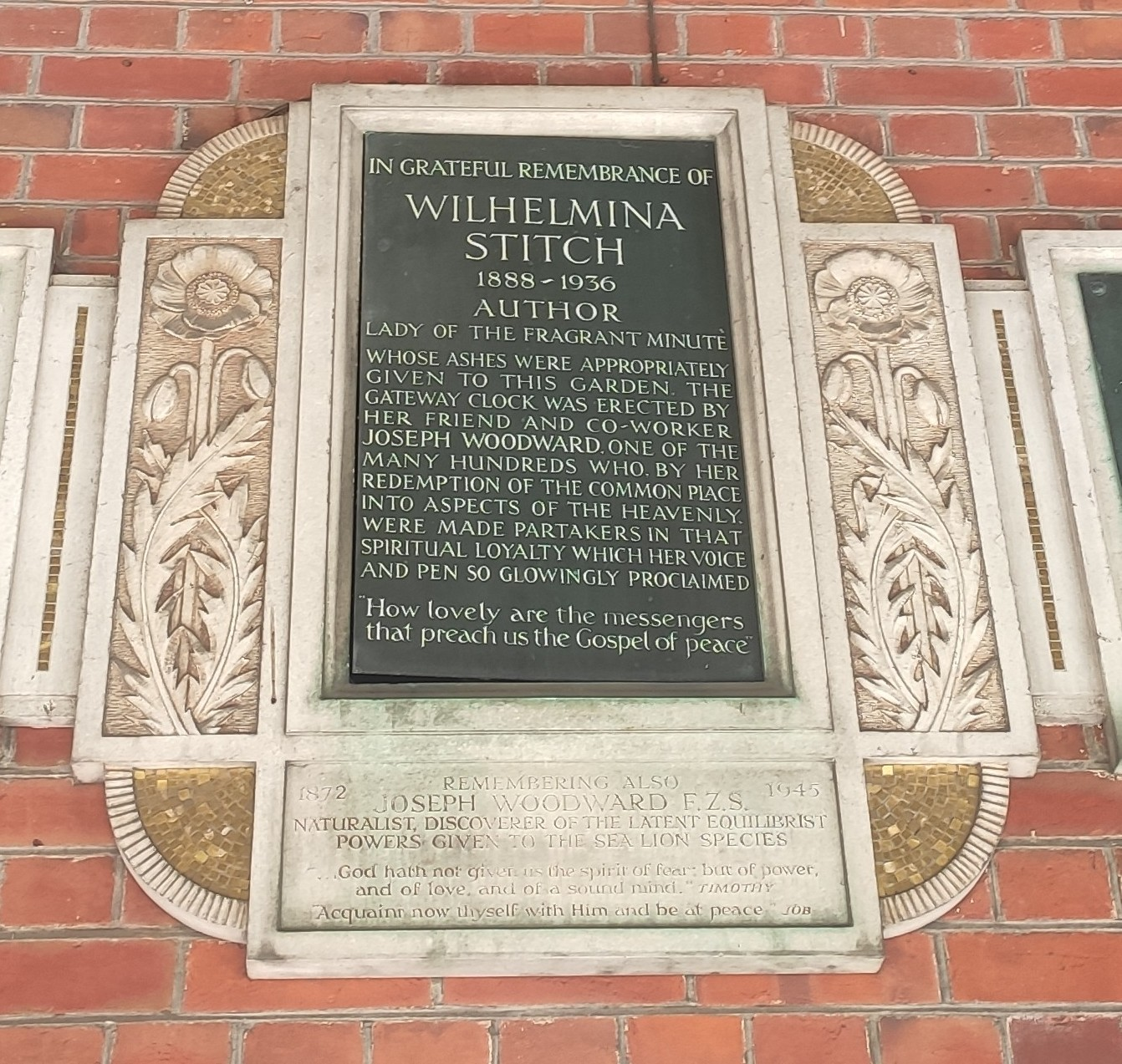
Plaque dedicated to Collie under her pen name at Golders Green Crematorium

Collie died in 1936 after a brief illness at the age of 48. She was cremated at Golders Green Crematorium.

== Works ==
Many of Collie's poems were published in the Winnipeg Telegram and the Western Home Monthly under the pen name Sheila Rand. After she moved back to England she continued to publish her 'Poem a Day' poems in many British journals and newspapers. She published collections of her poems all under the pen name Wilhelmina Stitch.

- Fragrant Minute for Every Day, (1925)
- Silken Threads, (1927)
- Homespun, (1928)
- Joy's Loom, (1928)
- Silver Linings, (1928)
- The Golden Web, (1928)
- Where Sunlight Falls, (1929)
- Tapestries, (1931)
- Catching the Gleam, (1932)
- The Wilhelmina Stitch Booklets, (1934) - published in six volumes
- Women of the Bible, (1935)

In 2007, the title of her book Homespun, published by Methuen under her pseudonym Wilhelmina Stitch, was considered funny enough to be included in a collection called Scouts in Bondage and other violations of literary propriety, by Michael Bell, a dealer in secondhand books.
