= Jennifer Cohen (fitness) =

American television personality

- Born: September 16, 1976 (age 50); Winnipeg, Manitoba, Canada
- Education: University of Manitoba; George Brown College
- Occupations: Entrepreneur, television personality, author, performance coach
- Website: www.jennifercohen.com

Jennifer Cohen (born September 16, 1976) is a fitness personality, author and body image consultant living in Los Angeles, California, United States of America.

== Career ==
Cohen is originally from Winnipeg, Manitoba, Canada and has a degree in psychology from the University of Manitoba. She attained a diploma in sports marketing from George Brown College in Toronto, and numerous fitness certifications. Cohen began her career as a personal trainer focusing on workouts that can be done with little or no equipment outside of a gym. She continues this philosophy of integrating fitness into everyday life. Cohen's philosophy of an everyday approach and realistic expectations is the focus of her first book, No Gym Required: Unleash Your Inner Rockstar. Her articles and quotes have appeared in Redbook, People and Perez Hilton's fitness-centric website, FitPerez. Her latest book is Strong is the New Skinny (2014).

=== Weight Watchers ===
Cohen began working with Weight Watchers in 2011. She became a spokesperson for the Weight Watchers Walk-It Challenge, a 5K walk in Los Angeles and various locations throughout the United States on May 22, 2011.

In February 2012, the Weight Watchers Points Plus Fitness Series were made available to Weight Watchers members. The 5-DVD set featured Cohen and her workouts.

=== Dr. Drew's Lifechangers ===
Cohen is a recurring guest on Lifechangers, a daytime talk show hosted by board certified internist and relationship expert, Dr. Drew Pinsky. In August 2011 Cohen began blogging for the show about various body image issues.

=== Men's Fitness ===
Cohen is a contributing author to the Men's Fitness column "The Rack" since 2012. Some of her more popular articles include "3 Reasons Men Should Do Yoga", "5 Things Muscle Activation Technique (MAT) Training Can Do for Your Body" and "Can Masturbation Help You Lose Weight?"

=== Momentum by Iron ===
In 2013, Cohen launched and became the manager of Momentum by Iron, a workout studio in Santa Monica, California. Momentum by Iron was named one of "L.A.'s Four Hot New Sweat Dens" by The Hollywood Reporter.

=== Health.com ===
Cohen writes on fitness topics, with lists of exercises to target specific body parts or goals, and new trends in the fitness industry. Her articles have been republished on the Huffington Post and on ABC News.com.
