= Neil Farber =

Canadian contemporary artist

- Born: 1975 (age 50–51); Winnipeg, Manitoba, Canada
- Known for: Contemporary artist

Neil Farber (born 1975) is a Canadian contemporary artist who lives and works in Winnipeg. His work has been exhibited internationally including in London, Copenhagen, Düsseldorf and New York City. He is known in particular his ink and watercolor drawings. He received a Bachelor of Fine Arts from the University of Manitoba and was a member, along with Marcel Dzama and others of The Royal Art Lodge. His work is also in the Museum of Modern Art and others. Farber was born in Winnipeg, Manitoba, Canada.

In a review of Farber's 2011 exhibition, Slugging, at Edward Thorp Gallery, Shane McAdams writes in The Brooklyn Rail: "Slugging, Neil Farber’s second exhibition at Edward Thorp, supplies an ample helping of the tragicomic faux-folk art fantasies we’ve come to associate with his work, though the degree to which they are intuited or calculated by the artist will start heated debates—or reignite old ones—among viewers. What is certain, though, is that something is amiss in Farber’s magical republic of drone-like naïfs, personified beasts, and mythical miscreants rising from ferments of cracked enamel, flowing resin, and crazed acrylic paint."
