= Frank Albo =

Canadian architectural historian

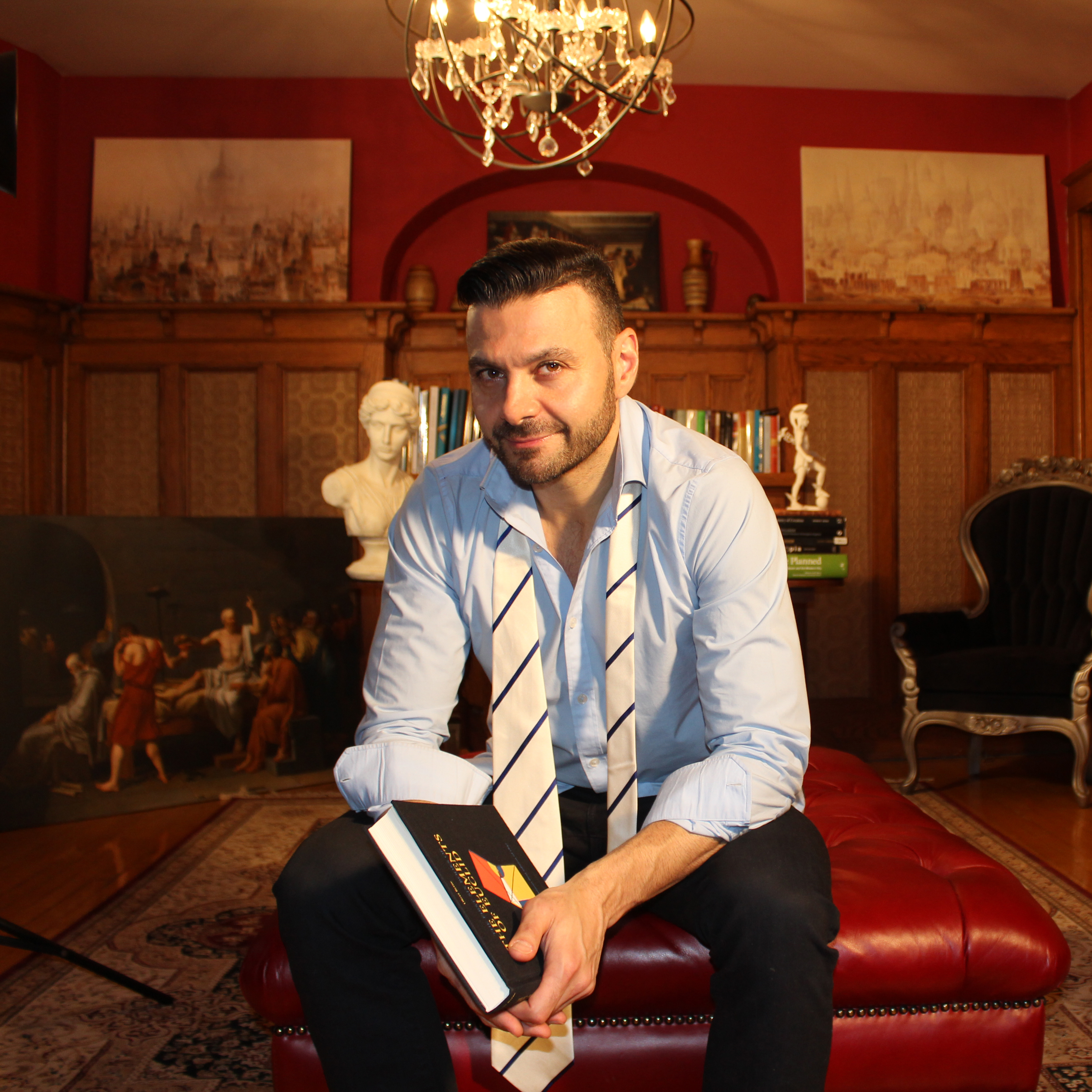
- Education: University of Winnipeg; University of Toronto; University of Amsterdam; Peterhouse, University of Cambridge
- Occupation: Architectural historian
- Notable work: The Hermetic Code (2007); Astana: Architecture, Myth, and Destiny (2017)
- Website: frankalbo.com

Frank Albo is a Canadian architectural historian. Albo is an adjunct professor of history at the University of Winnipeg. He specializes in architecture, Freemasonry, and the Western esoteric tradition. He is the author of Astana: Architecture, Myth, and Destiny (2017).

Albo is primarily known for his work on the Freemasonic symbolism of the Manitoba Legislative Building.

== Early life and education ==
Albo grew up in the West End of Winnipeg, Manitoba, Canada. He completed his Bachelor of Arts degree in religion and anthropology at the University of Winnipeg in 2002. Subsequently, he pursued further studies at the University of Toronto, where he was obtained a Master of Arts (MA) degree in Ancient Near Eastern civilizations. There he completed his thesis titled Nebuchadrezzar and the Stars: A New Perspective of the Theophany in the Book of Habakkuk 3:3–13. Continuing his academic pursuits, Albo earned a second MA degree in Hermetic Philosophy at the University of Amsterdam in 2006. His thesis was entitled Ritualist Revival: Fin de siècle Esoteric and the Oxford Movement. In 2007, Albo commenced his studies at Peterhouse, University of Cambridge, culminating in the attainment of his Master of Philosophy degree in the history of art in 2008 with the thesis, Charles Robert Cockerell and his Theories of Gothic Proportions from his Lectures at the Royal Academy. In 2012, Albo completed his education at the University of Cambridge, earning a Doctor of Philosophy degree in the history of architecture with the thesis, Freemasonry and the Nineteenth-Century British Gothic Revival.

== Publications ==
=== Hermetic Code ===
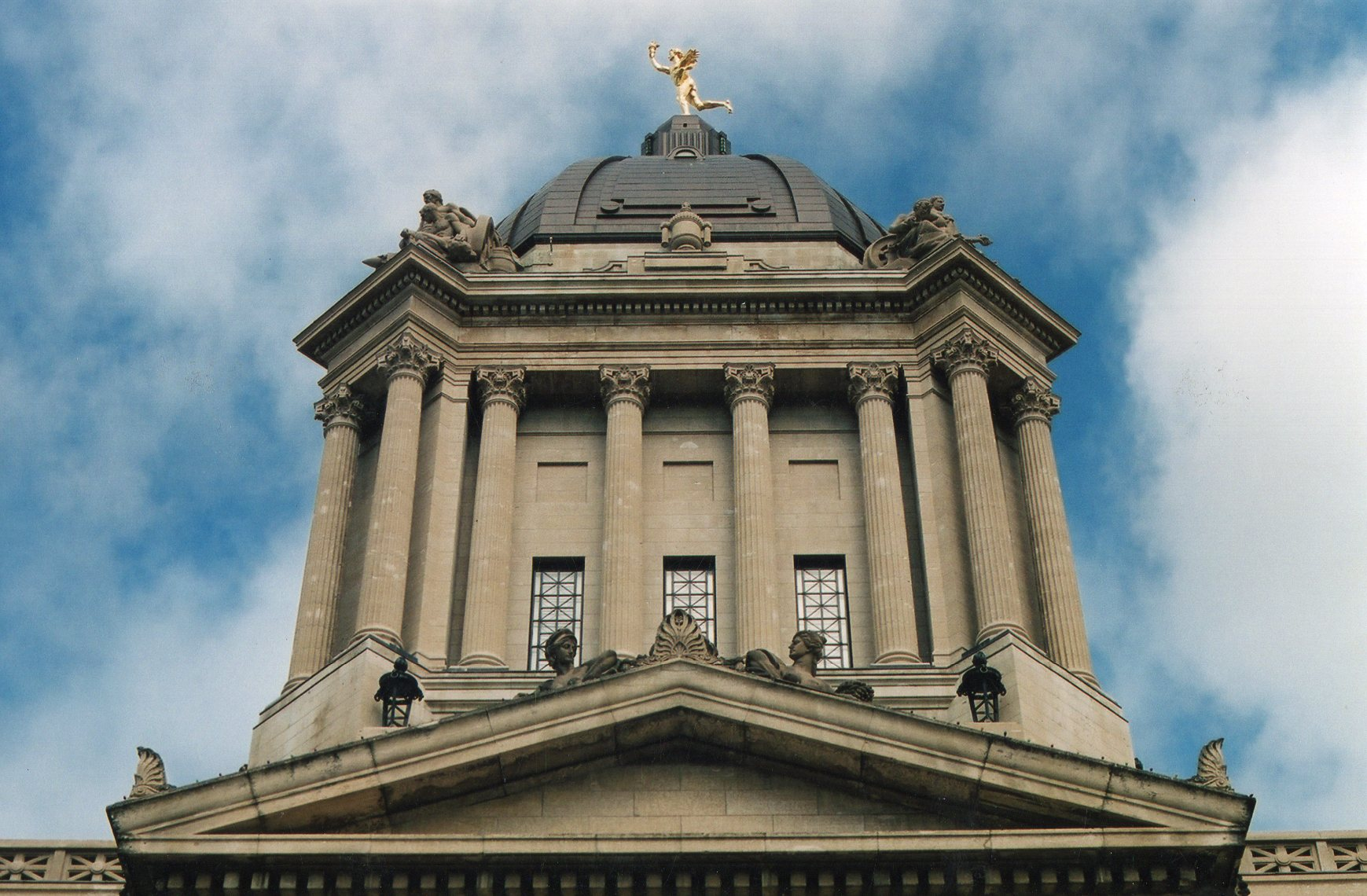
The Manitoba Legislative Building

In 2001, Albo began research into the Freemasonic and Hermetic influence on the design of the Manitoba Legislative Building after noticing two Egyptian sphinxes on the building's roof. Albo received government funding and support to conduct extensive research and freely explore the building, which enabled him to uncover its esoteric principles of design. This included hidden hieroglyphic inscriptions, the architect emulation of Solomon's Temple, and the architect of sacred geometry, and numerological codes, including the golden ratio, the Fibonacci sequence, and a tribute to the numbers "666" and "13". Albo concluded that British architect Frank Worthington Simon, himself a Freemason, had designed the edifice as "a temple [to Hermetic wisdom] masquerading as a government building."

Albo's discoveries became the basis for Carolin Vesely and Buzz Currie's 2007 book The Hermetic Code, which was published by the Winnipeg Free Press. Since 2009, Albo has led the Hermetic Code Tours through the Manitoba Legislative Building. In 2011, the Canadian Tourism Commission announced that it had added the Hermetic Code Tour to its list of premiere destinations as part of its international tourism campaign.

=== Astana: Architecture, Myth & Destiny ===
Albo continued his research into esoteric matters with his 2017 book Astana: Architecture, Myth & Destiny. In this work, he posits that the architecture of Astana, Kazakhstan, dubbed the "Illuminati Capital of the World", encodes a solution to the three greatest threats of the 21st century: religious extremism, environmental destruction, and the proliferation of nuclear weapons. The book also conceals an armchair treasure hunt called the Astana Challenge, an enigma of secrets and mysteries that when solved, reveals a hidden message.

== Bibliography ==
- Albo, Frank (2017). Astana: Architecture, Myth & Destiny. Winnipeg, Manitoba: Vidacom Publications. ISBN 978-1-988182-20-9.
- Vesely, Carolin; Currie, Buzz (2007). The Hermetic Code: Unlocking One of Manitoba's Greatest Secrets. Based on research by Albo, Frank. Winnipeg Free Press. ISBN 978-0-9682575-3-1.
