= Marcel Dzama =

Canadian artist

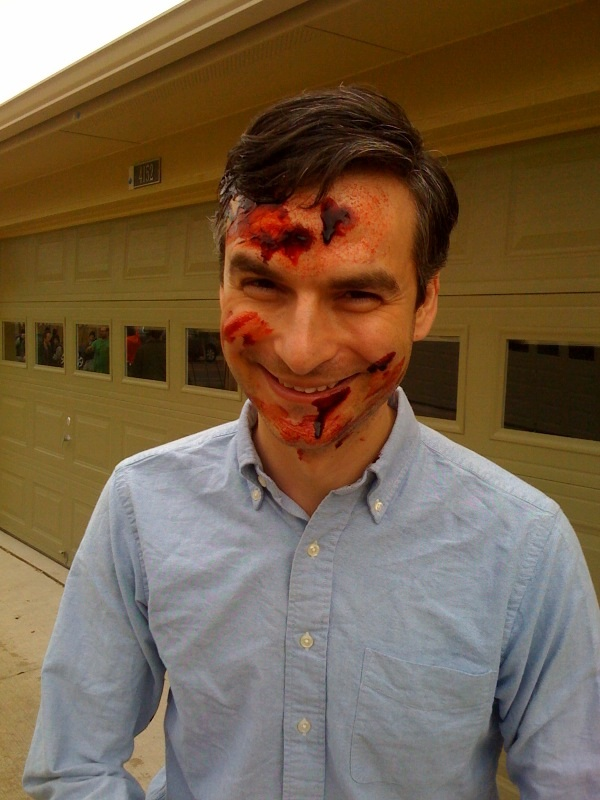
- Dzama on set of a Spike Jonze film in 2010
- Born: May 4, 1974 (age 52); Winnipeg, Manitoba, Canada
- Known for: Contemporary artist

Marcel Dzama (born May 4, 1974) is a Canadian-born contemporary artist from Winnipeg, Manitoba, Canada who currently lives and works in New York City. His work has been exhibited internationally, in particular his ink and watercolor drawings.

== Education ==
Dzama received his BFA from the University of Manitoba in 1997.

== Work ==
Dzama works extensively in sculpture, painting, collage, and film. The artist is also known for his intricate dioramas and large scale polyptychs that draw from his talents across a range of media. He works in multiple disciplines to bring a cast of human figures, animals, and imaginary hybrids to life, and has developed an international reputation and following for his art that depicts fanciful, anachronistic worlds. The artist is also known for his work with The Royal Art Lodge.

He was the inspiration for Deco Dawson's 2001 short film FILM(dzama).

Dzama's work has been used on the covers of numerous record albums, notably The Else by They Might Be Giants, Guero by Beck and Reconstruction Site by The Weakerthans. He also provided the cover art for literary critic Sianne Ngai's 2005 book Ugly Feelings, published by Harvard University Press. His costume designs can be seen in music videos for the Bob Dylan song, "When the Deal Goes Down", the N.A.S.A. song, "The People Tree", and the Department of Eagles song, "No One Does It Like You", which he also co-directed. McSweeney's has published two collections of his work, The Berlin Years in 2003 (reprinted in 2006) and a follow-up, The Berliner Ensemble Thanks You All, in 2008.

In 2010, composer Ed Bennett created "Dzama Stories", a piece of music inspired by Marcel Dzama, featuring Decibel and Paul Dunmall. It is music for amplified ensemble, electronics and improviser.

== Special projects ==
In 2016, Dzama created the costume and stage design for the New York City Ballet's The Most Incredible Thing, a performance based on Hans Christian Andersen's fairy tale.

== Exhibitions ==
Dzama has been the subject of solo exhibitions at the Musée d'Art Contemporain de Montréal (2010) and Pinakothek der Moderne, Munich (2008). In 2006, he had an exhibition at the Ikon Gallery in Birmingham, England, which traveled to the Centre for Contemporary Arts in Glasgow, Scotland.

Marcel Dzama cites Marcel Duchamp as one of his greatest inspirations and drew on the artist’s near-obsession with chess as a starting point for his video A Game of Chess, 2011, in which life-size kings, queens, rooks and pawns duel for supremacy in a production brought to life in Guadalajara, Mexico. The film is included in the collection of the National Gallery of Canada.

His work has been featured in numerous international exhibitions, including the group exhibitions Greetings from Winnipeg at the Minneapolis College of Art & Design, Minneapolis and Contemporary American Realist Drawings, the Jalane and Richard Davidson Collection at The Art Institute of Chicago (both 1999). In 2006, he was included in the Whitney Biennial exhibition, Down By Law: Day for Night at the Whitney Museum of American Art in New York. His work also featured in In Me / Out of Me at P.S.1 Contemporary Art Center, New York and Kunst-Werke, Berlin (2007); Wunderkammer: A Century of Curiosities at The Museum of Modern Art, New York (2008); Compass in Hand: Selections from The Judith Rothschild Foundation Contemporary Drawings Collection at The Museum of Modern Art, New York (2009); Moby Dick at CCA Wattis Institute for Contemporary Arts, San Francisco (2009); and the Sobey Art Award Short List at the Art Gallery of Nova Scotia (2009). In May 2016 the Labs Gallery in Bologna presented an exhibition of his works entitled "Masked Tales", which also featured the Italian artist, Vanni Cuoghi.

In 2023, Dzama participated in Performa 23 where he presented To live on the Moon (For Lorca).

In 2024, the McMichael Canadian Art Collection held a solo exhibition of his work titled Ghosts of Canoe Lake: New Work by Marcel Dzama.

in 2025, a solo exhibition of his work entitled Dancing with the Moon was shown at the Pera Museum in Istanbul.

== Collections ==
Dzama's work is in the collections of major museums and public institutions, including:

- the Andy Warhol Foundation for the Visual Arts, New York
- the Bass Museum of Art, Miami; the Centre Georges Pompidou, Paris
- the Corcoran Gallery of Art, Washington, D.C.
- the Dallas Museum of Art
- the Metropolitan Museum of Art, New York
- the Museum of Contemporary Art, North Miami
- the Museum of Modern Art, New York
- the Musée d’art contemporain de Montréal
- the National Gallery of Canada
- The Rhode Island School of Design Museum, Providence, Rhode Island
- the Tate Museum, London, UK
