= List of people from Manitoba =

Provincial flag of Manitoba

Map and location of Manitoba in Canada

This is a list of notable people who are from Manitoba, Canada, or have spent a large part or formative part of their career in the province.

== Business professionals ==
- Ida Albo, managing partner of the Fort Garry Hotel
- Gerald Smedley Andrews, land surveyor, Order of Canada recipient
- Izzy Asper, founder of Global Television Network
- Lloyd Axworthy, politician and former UW president, Nobel Prize nominee
- Tom Axworthy, Canadian civil servant and younger brother of Lloyd Axworthy
- G. Michael Bancroft, chemist and synchrotron scientist, first director of the Canadian Light Source
- Kathy Bardswick, president and CEO, The Co-operators
- Earl Barish, basketball coach and founder of Dickie Dee and Salisbury House
- George Montegu Black II, businessman, father of Conrad Black
- Bill Blaikie, NDP politician
- Margaret Bloodworth, national security advisor (BA 1970)
- Saidye Rosner Bronfman, wife of businessman Samuel Bronfman
- Samuel Bronfman, distillery magnate
- Chip and Pepper, founders of Chip and Pepper California
- Mark Chipman, founder of True North Sports & Entertainment
- David Culver, businessman, former CEO of Alcan
- Brian Dickson, former chief justice of the Supreme Court of Canada
- Waldron Fox-Decent, mediator, professor, Crown Corporation chairman
- Sydney Halter, lawyer, former CFL commissioner, Officer of the Order of Canada
- Bob Hunter, co-founder of Greenpeace
- F. Ross Johnson, former head of RJR Nabisco, featured in the book and film Barbarians at the Gate
- Jim Ludlow, president and CEO of True North Sports & Entertainment
- Guy Maddin, film director
- Frances Gertrude McGill, criminologist
- Peter Nygård, founder of Nygård International
- Sylvia Ostry, economist
- John Paskievich, film director and photographer
- Howard Pawley, former premier of Manitoba
- John Draper Perrin, business professional
- Bill Richardson, CBC radio host
- James Armstrong Richardson, businessman, politician, airport in Winnipeg was named for him
- James Armstrong Richardson Sr., father of James Armstrong Richardson
- Irv Robbins, co-founder of Baskin-Robbins
- Andrea Slobodian, reporter
- Susan Thompson, former mayor of Winnipeg
- Jim Treliving, founder of Boston Pizza
- Lila Bell Acheson Wallace, co-founder of the Reader's Digest
- Omar Zakhilwal, Afghan finance minister, chief economic advisor to the president of Afghanistan

== Athletes ==
=== Hockey ===
- Reg Abbott
- Jim Agnew
- Clint Albright
- Gary Aldcorn
- Bill Allum
- Arron Asham
- Carter Ashton
- Doug Baldwin
- Cam Barker
- Andy Bathgate
- Ken Baumgartner
- Paul Baxter
- Gordie Bell
- Joe Bell
- Gary Bergman
- Garry Blaine
- Andy Blair
- Rick Blight
- Lonny Bohonos
- Larry Bolonchuk
- Ryan Bonni
- Buddy Boone
- Jennifer Botterill, Olympic gold medal winner
- Dick Bouchard
- Dan Bourbonnais
- Madison Bowey
- Ralph Bowman
- Jack Bownass
- Dustin Boyd
- Wally Boyer
- Darren Boyko
- Bailey Bram
- Rube Brandow
- Andy Branigan
- Duane Bray
- Billy Breen
- Delayne Brian
- Gerry Brisson
- Turk Broda
- George Brown
- Harold Brown
- Larry Brown
- Cecil Browne
- Ray Brunel
- Ed Bruneteau
- Mud Bruneteau
- Barry Brust
- Al Buchanan
- Fred Burchell
- Bill Burega
- Shawn Byram
- Walter Byron
- Ryan Caldwell
- Don Caley
- Matt Calvert
- Jim Cardiff
- Bruce Carmichael
- Al Carr
- Greg Carroll
- Ed Chadwick
- Art Chapman
- Christian Chartier
- Dave Chartier
- Brad Chartrand
- Wayne Chernecki
- Stefan Cherneski
- Rich Chernomaz
- Real Chevrefils
- Ron Chipperfield
- Elliot Chorley
- Bob Chrystal
- Brad Church
- Andrew Clark
- Kevin Clark
- Bobby Clarke
- Brian Coates
- Delaney Collins
- Jim Collins
- Red Conn
- Jack Connolly
- Cam Connor
- Joe Cooper
- Riley Cote
- Art Coulter
- Thomas Coulter
- Adam Courchaine
- Rosario Couture
- Jimmy Creighton
- Clifford Crowley
- Joe Crozier
- Wilf Cude
- Barry Cullen
- Brian Cullen
- Cory Cyrenne
- Joe Daley
- Kimbi Daniels
- Lorne Davis
- Jordy Douglas
- Kent Douglas
- Red Dutton, former NHL commissioner
- Cody Eakin
- Garry Edmundson
- Joel Edmundson
- Gary Emmons
- Brian Engblom
- Dean Evason
- Bill Ezinicki
- Theoren Fleury
- Bill Folk
- Frank Fredrickson
- Byron Froese
- Owen Fussey
- Herb Gardiner
- Chay Genoway
- Butch Goring
- Haldor Halderson, 1920 Olympic gold medalist (Winnipeg Falcons)
- Al Hamilton
- Travis Hamonic
- Ted Harris
- Andy Hebenton
- Darren Helm
- Phil Hergesheimer
- Wally Hergesheimer
- Bryan Hextall
- Ron Hextall
- Ike Hildebrand
- Cecil Hoekstra
- Quinton Howden
- Dave Hrechkosy
- Ted Irvine, father of wrestler Chris Jericho
- Paul Jerrard
- Ching Johnson
- Jim Johnson
- Eddie Johnstone
- Jason Kasdorf
- Mike Keane
- Duncan Keith, Olympic gold medal winner
- Julian Klymkiw
- Aggie Kukulowicz
- Ed Kullman
- Gord Labossiere
- Max Labovitch
- Gord Lane
- Pete Langelle
- Derek Laxdal
- Jamie Leach
- Mike Leclerc
- Grant Ledyard
- Bryan Lefley
- Chuck Lefley
- Brendan Leipsic
- Bob Leiter
- Curtis Leschyshyn
- Junior Lessard
- Odie Lowe
- Bill MacKenzie
- Bill Masterton
- Fred Maxwell
- Dunc McCallum
- Kevin McCarthy
- Ab McDonald
- Dave McDonald
- Jacob Micflikier
- Nick Mickoski, member of Manitoba Sports Hall of Fame
- Bill Mosienko, member of Hockey Hall of Fame
- Colton Orr
- James Patrick
- Steve Patrick
- Johnny Peirson
- Alf Pike
- Ken Reardon, member of NHL Hall of Fame
- Terry Reardon
- Billy Reay
- James Reimer
- Mike Ridley
- Dunc Rousseau, WHA Winnipeg Jets player in the 1970s
- Terry Sawchuk, member of Hockey Hall of Fame
- Dave Semenko
- Damon Severson
- Patrick Sharp, 2010, 2013 and 2015 Stanley Cup winner, 2014 Olympic gold medalist
- Alex Shibicky
- Ron Shudra
- Warren Skorodenski
- Art Somers
- Emory Sparrow
- Lorne Stamler
- Wally Stanowski
- Alexander Steen
- Pete Stemkowski
- Blair Stewart
- Black Jack Stewart
- Mark Stone, 2023 Stanley Cup Champion
- Billy Taylor
- Jimmy Thomson
- Kevin Todd
- Jonathan Toews, Stanley cup winner 2010, 2013 & 2015
- Lindsay Vallis
- J.P. Vigier
- Dale Weise
- Duvie Westcott
- Ian White
- Neil Wilkinson
- Carey Wilson
- Bob Woytowich
- Ken Wregget
- Travis Zajac
- Chick Zamick (1926–2007)

=== Basketball ===
- Eric Bridgeland, coach
- Edward Dawson, 1936 Olympic team member
- Joey Johnson, wheelchair basketball player, member of Manitoba's Basketball Hall of Fame
- Bennie Lands, 1948 Olympic team member
- Todd MacCulloch, NBA player
- Rick McNair, basketball player and coach
- Erfan Nasajpour, in the Iranian Basketball Super League
- Chad Posthumus
- Carl Ridd, turned down an NBA contract
- Martin Riley, Olympian
- BT Toews, coach and father of Kai Toews
- Bob Town, 1976 Summer Olympics
- Joey Vickery, pro player in Europe
- Roy Williams, 1952 Summer Olympics
- Malcolm Wiseman, 1936 Olympic team member

=== Football ===
==== CFL players ====
- Al Ackland
- Donovan Alexander
- Bill Baker
- Keith Bennett
- Lorne Benson
- Mike Benson
- Andy Bieber
- Simon Blaszczak
- Ken Bochen
- Bill Boivin
- James Bond
- Brady Browne
- Jack Bruzell
- Zac Carlson
- Jim Carphin
- Bill Ceretti
- Walter Chikowski
- Scott Coe
- Anthony Coombs
- Billy Cooper
- Bruce Covernton
- Nic Demski
- Brian Dobie
- George Druxman
- Leo Ezerins
- Scott Flagel
- Jim Furlong
- Evan Gill
- Roger Hamelin
- John Hammond
- Andrew Harris
- Ben Hatskin
- Cal Murphy, CFL coach
- Don Oramasionwu
- T-Dre Player
- Joe Poplawski

==== NFL players ====
- Doug Brown
- Geoff Gray
- Rod Hill
- Israel Idonije
- T. J. Jones
- Les Lear
- David Onyemata
- Chad Rempel
- Mike Richardson
- Bobby Singh
- John Urschel
- Fred Vant Hull

=== Wrestling ===
- Bob Brown, wrestler and former WWE referee
- Kerry Brown, wrestler for Stampede Wrestling
- Don Callis, WWE and ECW wrestler
- Tony Condello, promoter
- Cathy Corino, TNA and Ring of Honor
- Steve Corino, WWE, TNA, and ECW wrestler
- Chi Chi Cruz, former WWE wrestler
- Allison Danger, TNA, and Ring of Honor star
- Johnny Devine, former WWE and ECW wrestler
- Paul Diamond, former WWE wrestler
- Danny Duggan, WWE wrestler
- Anthony Durante, former WWE wrestler
- Robert Evans, TNA and Ring of Honor star
- George Gordienko, wrestled for Stampede Wrestling
- David Hohl, former Olympic wrestler
- Ricky Hunter, WWE and NWA wrestler
- Chris Jericho, WWE wrestler
- Candice LeRae, NWA wrestler
- Tom Magee, WWE wrestler and power lifter
- Vance Nevada, former NWA wrestler
- Kenny Omega, WWE wrestler
- Fred Peloquin, AWA wrestler
- Rowdy Roddy Piper, WWE Hall of Famer
- Rosemary, TNA wrestler
- Courtney Rush, TNA wrestler
- Sarah Stock, TNA and Ring of Honor star
- Al Tomko, AWA wrestler
- The Von Steigers, former WWE tag team

=== Curling ===
- Dawn Askin
- Kerry Burtnyk
- Don Duguid, sportscaster
- Randy Dutiaume
- Janet Harvey
- Cathy Gauthier
- Steve Gould
- Jennifer Jones
- Connie Laliberte
- Carolyn McRorie, Olympic silver medal winner
- Jon Mead
- John Morris, Olympic gold medal winner
- B. J. Neufeld
- Chris Neufeld
- Denni Neufeld
- Jill Officer
- Cathy Overton-Clapham
- Gord Paterson
- Sam Penwarden
- Corinne Peters
- Daley Peters
- Vic Peters
- Kelly Scott
- Jeff Stoughton
- Bob Ursel
- Garry Van Den Berghe
- Ken Watson

=== Rugby ===
- James Campbell, former rugby player
- Jamie Cudmore, rugby player
- Brian Erichsen, rugby player
- Norm Hadley, former rugby player
- Amanda Thornborough, current Canada women's 15's rugby player
- Kevin Tkachuk, former rugby player

=== Golf ===
- Isabelle Beisiegel
- Harold Eidsvig
- Bill Ezinicki
- Dan Halldorson
- George Knudson
- Nick Taylor
- Margaret Todd

=== Volleyball ===
- Steven Brinkman
- Wanda Guenette
- Scott Koskie
- Eric Loeppky
- Taylor Pischke
- Michelle Sawatzky-Koop
- Adam Simac

=== Track and field ===
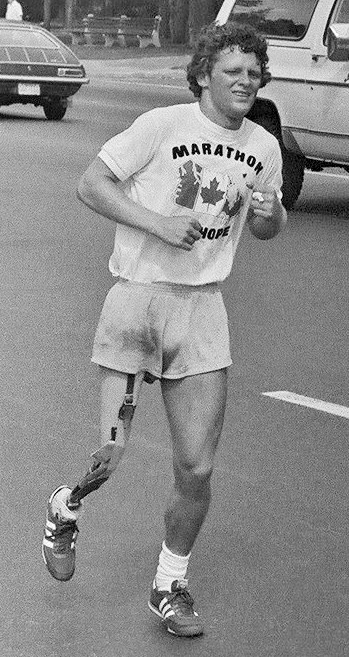
Terry Fox

- Angela Chalmers, Olympic bronze medalist (track and field)
- Cyril Coaffee, Olympic track and field athlete, member of Canada's Sports Hall of Fame
- Joe Keeper, Olympic long-distance runner, grandfather of Tina Keeper
- Betty Fox, mother of Terry Fox, founder of the Terry Fox Foundation
- Terry Fox, runner, cancer research activist, named "The Greatest Canadian"

=== Soccer (football) ===
- George Anderson
- Marco Bustos
- Bob Harley
- Robin Hart
- Doug McMahon
- Tony Nocita
- Sophie Schmidt
- Desiree Scott
- Frederick Stambrook
- Chelsea Stewart
- Héctor Vergara, FIFA referee
- Troy Westwood

=== Martial arts ===
- Mark Berger, fighter
- Robin Black, MMA fighter
- Dominique Bosshart, Olympic medalist (taekwondo)
- Roland Delorme, UFC fighter
- Joe Doerksen, UFC fighter
- Baxter Humby, kick boxer, winner of an ESPY Award in the music video of "Renegades" in Spider-Man 3
- Brad Katona, UFC fighter
- Donny Lalonde, MMA fighter and boxer
- Krzysztof Soszynski, UFC fighter on BuzzFeed in the movie Logan

=== Baseball ===
- Doris Barr, former All-American Girls Professional Baseball League player
- Eleanor Callow, former baseball player
- Gene Ford, former MLB player
- Russ Ford, former MLB player
- Audrey Haine, baseball player
- Dottie Hunter, former All-American Girls Professional Baseball League player
- Mel Kerr, MLB player
- Corey Koskie, MLB player
- Olive Little, former All-American Girls Professional Baseball League player
- Martha Rommelaere, former All-American Girls Professional Baseball League player
- Bud Sketchley, former MLB player
- Evelyn Wawryshyn, former All-American Girls Professional Baseball League player

=== Others ===
- David Chapman, cricketer
- Sadie Grimm, motorcyclist, 1914 Manitoba Motorcycle Club's gold medal winner, first woman to win in a Canadian motorcycling event also open to men
- David Hart, water polo
- Bon MacDougall, NASCAR racing driver
- Damian Mills, cricketer
- Rachel Riddell, water polo
- Nic Youngblud, water polo

Winter sports

- Susan Auch, Olympic medalist (speed skating)
- Clara Hughes, 6-time Olympic gold medalist (cycling and speed skating)
- Cindy Klassen, 6-time Olympic medalist (speed skating)
- Doreen McCannell-Botterill, speed skater
- Jon Montgomery, Olympic gold medalist (skeleton racing), host of The Amazing Race Canada

== Religious leaders ==
- Abishabis, Aboriginal leader
- John Bruce, Aboriginal leader
- Rod Bushie, Aboriginal leader
- David Chartrand, Aboriginal leader
- Ken Courchene, Aboriginal leader
- Ron Evans, Aboriginal leader
- Jerry Fontaine, Aboriginal leader
- John Joseph Harper, Aboriginal leader
- Alexandre-Antonin Taché, Archbishop of Saint Boniface, Manitoba
- Tepastenam, Aboriginal leader
- Marie-Louise Valade, established the Sisters of Charity at the Red River Mission
- Frank Whitehead, Aboriginal leader

== Singers, songwriters, musicians ==
- Chad Allan, Juno Award-winning artist
- Don Amero
- Jeffrey Anderson, radio producer
- W. H. Anderson
- Maria Aragon, performed with Lady Gaga and on The Ellen DeGeneres Show
- Randy Bachman
- Tal Bachman
- Tim Bachman
- Del Barber
- Ishq Bector
- Steve Bell
- Herbert Belyea
- Lloyd Blackman
- Heather Blush
- Oscar Brand
- Lenny Breau
- Jon Buller
- Stephen Carroll
- Marco Castillo
- Jason Churko
- Tom Cochrane, Grammy-nominated artist
- Amanda Cook
- Burton Cummings
- Mychael Danna
- Victor Davies
- Andy de Jarlis
- Diz Disley
- Mitch Dorge
- Matt Epp
- Ed Evanko
- Christine Fellows
- Brent Fitz
- Ken Fleming
- Fresh I.E.
- Bryan Fustukian
- Ian Gardiner
- Heidi Gluck
- Daniel Greaves
- Frederick Grinke
- Mitchell Grobb
- Tim Harwill
- Dianne Heatherington
- Filmer Hubble
- Terry Jacks
- David James
- Rob James
- Gordie Johnson
- Juliette
- Jim Kale
- James Keelaghan
- Wab Kinew, now leader of the Manitoba NDP
- Allan Kingdom, Grammy-nominated hip-hop artist
- Ash Koley
- Mark Korven
- Chantal Kreviazuk
- Joel Kroeker
- Daniel Lavoie
- Ashley Leitão
- Greg Leskiw
- Alana Levandoski
- Cara Luft
- Earl MacDonald
- Gisele MacKenzie
- Fraser MacPherson
- Greg MacPherson
- Keith Macpherson
- Damian Marshall
- Julie Masi
- Romi Mayes
- Donnie McDougall
- Loreena McKennitt, Grammy-nominated artist
- Holly McNarland
- Glen Meadmore
- Neil Merryweather
- Jenn Mierau
- Ruth Moody
- Lorne Munroe
- Bif Naked
- Zara Nelsova
- Jon Neufeld
- Tim Neufeld
- Bob Nolan
- Tiny Parham
- Brandon Paris
- Fred Penner
- Julie Penner
- Johnny Perrin
- Randolph Peters
- Garry Peterson
- William Prince
- Eric Radford
- Jackie Rae
- Donn Reynolds
- Brad Roberts
- Dan Roberts, bassist
- Ashley Robertson
- Bob Rock
- John K. Samson
- Bernie Senensky
- Joey Serlin
- Remy Shand, nominated for 4 Grammy awards
- Shingoose
- Al Simmons
- Son of Dave
- Fred Turner
- Venetian Snares
- Lindy Vopnfjörð
- Bill Wallace
- Neil Young

=== Groups ===
- Brother
- Live on Arrival
- LuLu and the TomCat
- Sagkeeng's Finest, winners of Canada's Got Talent

== Actors ==
- Ted Atherton, on Traders
- Cameron Bancroft, on Supernatural
- Adam Beach, in Suicide Squad
- Robert Bockstael, on X-Men (series)
- Steve Braun, in The Skulls III
- Jay Brazeau, voice actor on Mega Man (1994 series)
- Greg Bryk, in Immortals (2011) and The Incredible Hulk
- Len Cariou, in Prisoners (2013)
- Jonas Chernick, on The Best Laid Plans
- Ari Cohen, on A Little Thing Called Murder
- Michael D. Cohen, on Henry's World
- Wallace Douglas, on Spies of the Air
- Brian Drader, in Shall We Dance? (2004)
- Ed Evanko, in Double Jeopardy (1999)
- Tibor Feheregyhazi, actor
- Brendan Fehr, in Guardians of the Galaxy
- Darcy Fehr, in Desire (2000)
- Ken Finkleman, in Grease 2
- Daniel Gillies, in Spider-Man 2
- Monty Hall, host of Let's Make a Deal
- Joshua Henry, in The Scottsboro Boys
- Tom Jackson, on Star Trek: The Next Generation
- Gerald MacIntosh Johnston, in Little Friend
- Richard Kahan, on Supernatural
- Ryan Kennedy, in Scream (1996)
- Terry Klassen, in Barbie
- Ken Kostick, on The Food Network
- Jack Kruschen, on Batman
- Jeremy Kushnier, actor
- Fletcher Markle, on Thriller
- Paul Maxwell, in Indiana Jones and the Last Crusade
- Tom McCamus, on The Newsroom
- Glen Meadmore, friends with John Wayne Gacy
- Lee Montgomery, on The Million Dollar Duck
- Peter Mooney, on Camelot
- Bob Nolan, on Night Time in Nevada
- John Paizs, on The Kids in the Hall
- Ross Petty, in the X-Men film series
- Douglas Rain, in The Man Who Skied Down Everest
- Donnelly Rhodes, on The Golden Girls
- Kenny Robinson, friends with Russell Peters and Vince Carter
- Ron Rubin, Morph in X-Men
- Ted Rusoff, on After Death
- Aaron Schwartz, on The Outside Chance of Maximilian Glick
- Kerry Shale, on The Lion, the Witch and the Wardrobe (1988 series)
- David Steinberg, actor, 5-time Emmy Award winner
- Robert Tinkler, on Cyberchase, Beyblade, and Sailor Moon
- Kristopher Turner, on Saving Hope
- Ryan Ward, on Son of the Sunshine
- Marshall Williams, on How to Build a Better Boy
- Ty Wood, in Keep Your Head Up, Kid: The Don Cherry Story

== Actresses ==
- Claire Adams, in The Big Valley
- Martha Burns, on Mad Ship
- Sarah Carter, on Smallville
- Ma-Anne Dionisio, in Les Misérables
- Heather Doerksen, in Pacific Rim
- Deanna Durbin, in For the Love of Mary
- Melissa Elias, in Tamara (2005)
- Ida Engel, on The Gong Show
- Dianne Heatherington, in Zero Patience
- Tina Keeper, in For Angela
- Mimi Kuzyk, in A Christmas Wedding
- Carla Lehmann, in Fame Is the Spur
- Nadia Litz, in The Mighty
- Mara Marini, on Black-ish
- Belinda Montgomery, in Tron: Legacy
- Libby Morris, on Not Quite Paradise
- Brooke Palsson, on Between
- Anna Paquin, in the X-Men film series and Phineas and Ferb
- Dorothy Patrick, was married to Lynn Patrick
- Shirley Patterson, on Batman serial
- Tracy Spiridakos, on Revolution
- Sonia Sui, in Toy Story 3
- Sara Thompson, in The 100
- Nia Vardalos, in My Big Fat Greek Wedding
- Gwynyth Walsh, in Star Trek: The Next Generation and Supernatural, season 1
- Catherine Wreford, on Wrestlemaniac

== Performers ==
- Shawn Farquhar, magician on The Ellen DeGeneres Show
- Amber Fleury, recording artist
- Deven Green, comedian
- Dean Gunnarson, magician
- Doug Henning, magician
- Ashley Leitão
- Keith Macpherson
- Luke McMaster
- David Steinberg, comedian
- Meaghan Waller, winner of Canada's Next Top Model
- Zack Werner, judge
- Brian Zembic, magician

== War heroes ==
- Leo Clarke, Victoria Cross winner
- Frederick William Hall, Victoria Cross winner in World War I
- Coulson Norman Mitchell, Victoria Cross winner World War I
- Andrew Charles Mynarski, Victoria Cross winner
  in World War II
- Frank Pickersgill, SOE agent in World War II executed by the Nazis
- Tommy Prince, highly decorated Aboriginal soldier with the Devil's Brigade in World War II
- Robert Shankland, Victoria Cross winner in World War I
- Sir William Stephenson (a.k.a. Intrepid), spy, man on whom the character of James Bond is based

== Writers ==
- David Bergen, novelist
- Di Brandt, poet
- Martha Brooks, writer
- Norman Cantor, writer, historian
- Solomon Cleaver, writer
- Patrick Friesen, poet
- Betty Gibson, author
- Erving Goffman, writer, sociologist
- Paul Hiebert, author
- Edna Mayne Hull, science fiction writer
- Guy Gavriel Kay, novelist and poet
- Margaret Laurence, novelist
- Jake MacDonald, novelist
- Mary MacLane, writer
- Bill Mason, author, filmmaker, environmentalist
- Marshall McLuhan, writer, media theorist
- Duncan Mercredi, poet
- Casey Plett, author
- David Robertson, author
- Gabrielle Roy, author
- Carol Shields, Pulitzer Prize–winning novelist
- Joan Thomas, author
- Miriam Toews, author
- Andrew Unger, author
- A. E. van Vogt, science fiction writer
- Katherena Vermette, writer
- Joshua Whitehead, author
- Armin Wiebe, writer
- Adele Wiseman, author
- George Woodcock, writer

=== Cartoonists/characters ===
- George Freeman, artist for several comic books including Captain Canuck
- Eric Gurney, cartoonist for Disney
- Roy Peterson, editorial cartoonist
- Jon St. Ables, cartoonist
- James Simpkins, creator of Jasper the Bear
- Charles Thorson, creator of Bugs Bunny
- Colin Upton, cartoonist
- Winnie-the-Pooh, one of Disney's best-known characters, named for Winnipeg

== Journalists ==
- Ralph Allen
- Jeffrey Anderson, radio producer
- Ashleigh Banfield, TV host and ABC news reporter
- Rosemary Barton, broadcaster for The National
- Paul Boyd, reporter for Inside Edition
- Barry Broadfoot
- Bertram Brooker
- Cecily Brownstone
- Tyler Brûlé
- George Fisher Chipman
- Lisa R. Cohen, producer for the Oprah Winfrey Show
- John Wesley Dafoe
- Dawna Friesen, NBC correspondent
- Suzanne Goldenberg
- Kaj Hasselriis
- Ella Cora Hind
- Bob Hunter, co-founder of Greenpeace
- Ben Metcalfe, former chairman of Greenpeace
- Don Newman, CBC broadcaster
- Scott Oake, sports broadcaster; father of Britain's Got Talent contestant Darcy Oake
- Catherine Seipp
- Linden Soles, CNN broadcaster
- Diana Swain, CBC broadcaster
- Brian Williams, sports broadcaster
- Larry Zolf

== Scientists, medical professionals, and teachers ==
- Reg Alcock, former president of the Treasury Board of Liberal Prime Minister Paul Martin's cabinet
- Robert Archambeau, ceramic artist, Governor General's Award winner
- Arthur Henry Reginald Buller F.R.S.C., FRS, mycologist
- Karen Busby, feminist scholar and professor of law
- Patricia Churchland, former professor of philosophy, known for the school of eliminative materialism
- Paul Churchland, former professor of philosophy, known for the school of eliminative materialism
- Jean Friesen, former deputy premier and minister of Intergovernmental Affairs of NDP Premier Gary Doer's cabinet
- Aniruddha M. Gole, IEEE Fellow
- Frank Hawthorne F.R.S.C., mineral sciences professor
- Guy Maddin, film director and former professor
- Teresa McDonell, nun, nurse and teacher
- Nathan Mendelsohn, professor of mathematics
- Jim Peebles, Nobel Prize-winning physicist
- Zalman Schachter-Shalomi, major founder of the Jewish Renewal movement
- Arthur Schafer, prominent ethicist, director of the Centre for Professional and Applied Ethics
- Carol Shields, Pulitzer Prize-winning author
- Vaclav Smil, energy systems scientist and policy analyst
- Robert Thirsk, astronaut, STS-78 shuttle mission
- H. C. Wolfart, professor of linguistics

== Criminals ==
- Scott Bairstow, rapist
- Gerald Blanchard, robber
- John Martin Crawford, serial killer
- Larry Fisher, murderer and rapist
- Del Fontaine, boxer and murderer
- Ken Leishman, robber
- Benjamin Levin, sex offender
- Karl McKay, murderer
- Earle Nelson, serial killer
- Nicole Redhead, murderer

=== Murder victims ===
- Tina Fontaine
- John Joseph Harper
- Helen Betty Osborne
- Jaylene Redhead
- Phoenix Sinclair

=== Wrongfully convicted of murder ===
- James Driskell
- David Milgaard
- Thomas Sophonow

== Politicians ==
This list mainly includes those people from Manitoba who had political careers outside of Manitoba, but also includes especially-notable people who had political careers within Manitoba (as presumably most Manitoba politicians are from Manitoba).

- Douglas R. Archer, former mayor of Regina
- Niki Ashton
- Candice Bergen
- Rana Bokhari
- Douglas Lloyd Campbell, premier of Manitoba, longest-serving Manitoba MLA
- Maria Chaput
- Marlene Cowling
- Thomas Crerar, member of Parliament, Senator, leader of the Progressive Party, first politician appointed Companion of the Order of Canada
- Shari Decter Hirst
- David J. Dyson, shortest-serving mayor of Winnipeg
- Bev Desjarlais
- Ruby Dhalla, member of Parliament in Ontario
- Dorothy Dobbie
- Tommy Douglas, father of Medicare in Canada
- Ronald Duhamel, Veterans Affairs minister in the Jean Chrétien government
- Elijah Harper, Native leader, Manitoba MLA
- John Harvard, member of Parliament, CBC broadcaster, Manitoba lieutenant governor
- S. I. Hayakawa, United States senator
- Francis Lawrence Jobin, Manitoba lieutenant governor
- Stanley Knowles, member of Parliament, Order of Canada recipient
- Peter Liba, journalist, businessman, Manitoba lieutenant governor
- Sterling Lyon, premier of Manitoba
- Hugh John Macdonald, premier of Manitoba and son of Canada's first prime minister (John A. Macdonald)
- Grant MacEwan, former mayor of Calgary
- John Stewart McDiarmid, Manitoba lieutenant governor
- Gerry McGeer, former mayor of Vancouver
- Pearl McGonigal, Manitoba lieutenant governor
- William John McKeag, Manitoba lieutenant governor
- Daniel Hunter McMillan, Manitoba lieutenant governor
- Roland Fairbairn McWilliams, Manitoba lieutenant governor
- Arthur Meighen, prime minister of Canada
- Darrell Pasloski, premier of Yukon
- Jack Pickersgill, former MP representing Newfoundland
- Louis Riel, Metis leader, member of Parliament
- Dufferin Roblin, premier of Manitoba
- Denise Savoie, British Columbia member of Parliament, assistant deputy speaker of the House of Commons
- Edward Schreyer, premier of Manitoba, Governor General of Canada
- John Christian Schultz, Manitoba lieutenant governor
- Alfred Henry Scott, Louis Riel delegate
- Mitchell Sharp, Liberal federal cabinet minister
- William Johnston Tupper, Manitoba lieutenant governor
- Daniel Vandal
- Larissa Waters, Australian senator
- J. S. Woodsworth, member of Parliament, first leader of CCF

== Notable families ==
- Asper family – Izzy Asper, founder of Global Television Network
  - David Asper
  - Gail Asper
  - Leonard Asper
- Black family – George Montegu Black Sr., businessman
  - Conrad Black, newspaper publisher
  - George Montegu Black II, 1950s president of Canadian Breweries
  - David Culver, former CEO of Alcan (father's sister was the maternal grandmother of Conrad Black)
- Richardson family – James Richardson, businessman and founder of James Richardson & Sons
  - James Armstrong Richardson Sr., businessman, grandson of James Richardson
    - James Armstrong Richardson II, businessman and politician, for whom the Winnipeg airport was named
    - Agnes Benidickson (raised in Winnipeg), first female chancellor of Queen's University at Kingston, Ontario
    - William Moore Benidickson, Dauphin-born member of Parliament for Kenora—Rainy River, husband of Agnes Benidickson
    - Kathleen M. Richardson, philanthropist

== Other notable people ==
- David Reimer, man raised as a girl who became a famous case in sexology
