= Blaszczak =

Blaszczak, originally Błaszczak (Polish) is a surname. Notable people with the surname include:

- Mariusz Błaszczak (born 1969), Polish politician and historian
- Simon Blaszczak (born 1983), Canadian football player

== See also ==
- Błaszczyk
