= 1971 CFL draft =

Canadian football draft

The 1971 CFL draft composed of nine rounds where 70 Canadian football players that were chosen exclusively from eligible Canadian universities. The Saskatchewan Roughriders, despite being Western Conference finalists, had the first overall selection through a trade with the last place Winnipeg Blue Bombers.

== 1st round ==
1. Saskatchewan Roughriders Brian Donnelly DB Simon Fraser

2. Ottawa Rough Riders Bob Eccles LB Carleton

3. British Columbia Lions Archie McCord T Simon Fraser

4. Edmonton Eskimos Mel Smith E Alberta

5. Winnipeg Blue Bombers Peter Ribbins DB Ottawa

6. Saskatchewan Roughriders Bill Manchuk DB Alberta

7. Winnipeg Blue Bombers Bob Kraemer QB Manitoba

8. Edmonton Eskimos Cam Innes C Queen's

9. Winnipeg Blue Bombers John Gauthier T Ottawa

== 2nd round ==
10. Calgary Stampeders Joe Petrone PK Calgary

11. Hamilton Tiger-Cats Bob Foulsewych FB Guelph

12. British Columbia Lions Michel Levelle F Ottawa

13. Edmonton Eskimos Pat Lett T Guelph

14. Toronto Argonauts Bob Hamilton E Waterloo Lutheran

15. Saskatchewan Roughriders John Steele LB Simon Fraser

16. Hamilton Tiger-Cats Walter Sehr HB Toronto

17. Calgary Stampeders Dan Dulmage T McGill

18. Calgary Stampeders Greg Gibson DB Calgary

== 3rd round ==
19. Winnipeg Blue Bombers Clay McEvoy TB Simon Fraser

20. Ottawa Rough Riders Bob Padfield T Waterloo

21. British Columbia Lions Henry Lodewyks F Manitoba

22. Edmonton Eskimos Gene Wolkowski E Guelph

23. Toronto Argonauts Ron Faulkner T Queen's

24. Saskatchewan Roughriders Jim Lazaruk C Alberta

25. Hamilton Tiger-Cats Paul Zarek Safety McMaster

26. Calgary Stampeders James Bond DT Simon Fraser

27. Calgary Stampeders Dwayne Dudgeon E Loyola

== 4th round ==
28. Winnipeg Blue Bombers Walt McKee PK Manitoba

29. Ottawa Rough Riders Art Lord DB Saskatchewan

30. British Columbia Lions John Chapman E Toronto

31. Edmonton Eskimos Dick Flynn G New Brunswick

32. Toronto Argonauts Bill Morrison DE Guelph

33. Saskatchewan Roughriders Bob Clarke DE Alberta

34. Hamilton Tiger-Cats Chuck Wakefield E Waterloo

35. Calgary Stampeders Ross Cote G Calgary

36. Montreal Alouettes Tony Proudfoot LB New Brunswick

== 5th round ==
37. Winnipeg Blue Bombers Steve Howell E Windsor

38. Ottawa Rough Riders Steve Derbyshire T Western Ontario

39. British Columbia Lions Mike Begg WR Simon Fraser

40. Edmonton Eskimos Don Tallas DB Alberta

41. Toronto Argonauts Allan Dresser G Windsor

42. Saskatchewan Roughriders Fred Pazarena LB Simon Fraser

43. Hamilton Tiger-Cats Jim Dimitroff FB Saint Mary's

44. Calgary Stampeders Bryden Murray C Bishop's

45. Montreal Alouettes Jack Galbraith T Manitoba

== 6th round ==
46. Winnipeg Blue Bombers Paul Paddon DB Ottawa

47. Ottawa Rough Riders Steve Hoffman DE Windsor

48. British Columbia Lions Ron Fowler TB British Columbia

49. Edmonton Eskimos Bob Rowe LB Calgary

50. Toronto Argonauts Bill Hartley G St. Francis Xavier

51. Winnipeg Blue Bombers Roy Parker F Manitoba

52. Hamilton Tiger-Cats Rodger Hunter DB Guelph

53. Calgary Stampeders Bruce Macrae HB Western Ontario

54. Montreal Alouettes Bob Keating T Manitoba

== 7th round ==
55. Winnipeg Blue Bombers Ben Labovich E Carleton

56. Ottawa Rough Riders George Hill LB Western Ontario

57. British Columbia Lions John Farlinger DB Calgary

58. Edmonton Eskimos Jack Buchan E Toronto

59. Winnipeg Blue Bombers Art Rochette QB Queen's

60. Hamilton Tiger-Cats Mike Chevers E Waterloo

61. Calgary Stampeders Don Hickey E Alberta

62. Montreal Alouettes Jack Schneider LB Bishop's

== 8th round ==
63. Winnipeg Blue Bombers Ian Jukes G British Columbia

64. Ottawa Rough Riders Marshall Caplan LB McMaster

65. British Columbia Lions Bryan Ansley DT Simon Fraser

66. Hamilton Tiger-Cats Wayne Fox F Waterloo

67. Montreal Alouettes Peter Merrill QB New Brunswick

== 9th round ==
68. Winnipeg Blue Bombers Dennis Hrychiko HB Manitoba

69. British Columbia Lions Gerald Fraser G Manitoba

70. Montreal Alouettes Art Strothart DB New Brunswick
