= Dorothy Howard (mezzo-soprano) =

Dorothy Howard, also known as Dorothy Howard Brooks, (4 February 1929 – 1 March 2013) was a Canadian mezzo-soprano and voice teacher. She was a founding member of the Saskatoon Opera Association and was for a period the director of that opera company. She was a longtime faculty member of the University of Saskatchewan (US) where she served as the director of its voice program from 1970 until her retirement in 1990. She was named a professor emeritus of the US.

== Life and career ==
Born Dorothy Phimister in Winnipeg, Canada, Howard was the daughter of Scottish-Canadian parents. She earned multiple degrees in music from the University of Manitoba; including a Bachelor of Arts in 1949, a Master of Music in vocal performance in 1963, and several music licensures. She supported herself while a university student as a writer for the CBC Times. Her first marriage to a Mr. Howard ended in divorce. She later married a second time to Eric Brooks in 1976.

Howard studied voice privately with Maureen Forrester in Toronto and Marjorie Thomas in England. She taught high school music in Winnipeg from 1960-1969. She earned a Master of Education at the University of Saskatchewan (US) in 1980. She taught on the music faculty of the US from 1969 through 1990; notably serving as director of its voice program from 1970 until her retirement twenty years lead. In March 1982 she presented a lecture-recital on Canadian Women Composers at the University of Michigan for the first international conference on Women in Music organized by The College Music Society.

As a performer, Howard was a member of The Choristers from 1958 through 1968; singing as both a soloist and a choir member under Filmer Hubble. In 1978 she was a founding member of the Saskatoon Opera Association with whom she performed as leading mezzo-soprano during the 1980s. Roles she sang with the company included Mercédès in Carmen (with Lyn Vernon in the title part), the title role in Iolanthe (1982), The Mother in Amahl and the Night Visitors (1983), and the Witch in Hansel and Gretel (1986). She also served as director of the SOA. She was also a soloist in concerts with the CBC Winnipeg Orchestra, Winnipeg Symphony Orchestra, Regina Symphony Orchestra, and Saskatoon Symphony Orchestra. She gave many recitals broadcast on CBC Radio which often featured new works by Canadian composers. Contemporary composers whose music she performed included Murray Adaskin, Violet Archer, Michael Colgrass, Jean Coulthard, Robert Fleming, Harry Freedman, R. Murray Schafer, and Harry Somers. She was still performing as late as 1994 when she gave a concert of music by Ottorino Respighi with the Lafayette String Quartet at the US.

While principally a singer and educator, Howard also composed the song "Celebrate Saskatchewan" which was published in Celebrate Saskatchewan Songbook (1980) and Saskatchewan Music (1980). She also worked as a judge for the Metropolitan Opera National Council Auditions. She died in Winnipeg on 1 March 2013.
