= Grigory Kalinovsky =

Violinist and educator

Grigory Kalinovsky is a violinist and an educator. He has been on the faculty at Indiana University Jacobs School of Music since September 2013.

Mr. Kalinovsky began his studies in his native St. Petersburg, Russia under Tatiana Liberova. Upon moving to the United States, he continued his studies at the Manhattan School of Music, graduating from Pinchas Zukerman Performance Program, studying with Maestro Pinchas Zukerman and Patinka Kopec.

After graduating from the Manhattan School of Music Mr. Kalinovsky joined the faculty at his alma mater until his move to Indiana University in 2013. As an active educator, he has taught in numerous summer programs, including Pinchas Zukerman's Young Artists Program in Canada, Heifetz International Music Institute, and Keshet Eilon Mastercourse. He has been invited for masterclasses internationally at some of the most esteemed music schools, including New England Conservatory, Colburn School, Sibelius Academy in Finland, and Jerusalem Music Center, among others.

Professor Kalinovsky is notable for his ergonomic approach to violin technique. He has written articles about the topic published on Strings Magazine., Strad Magazine, and gave a lecture at 2017 American String Teachers Association Annual Conference, titled "Taming Tension".

His students have won prizes at national and international competitions, including Yehudi Menuhin International Competition for Young Violinists, Andrea Postacchini Young Violinists Competition in Italy, Fischoff International Chamber Music Competition in Chicago, and Tibor Varga Junior Violin Competition in Switzerland.

== Recordings ==
Shostakovich Violin Sonata and Twenty-Four Preludes, transcribed for violin and piano by Dmitri Tziganov and Lera Auerbach; Grigory Kalinovsky, violin with Tatiana Goncharova, piano. Centaur Records.

Weinberg, Complete Sonatas and Sonatina for Violin and Piano; Grigory Kalinovsky, violin with Tatiana Goncharova, piano. Naxos Records.

== Sources and External Links ==
- Grigory Kalinovsky Website
- Faculty page for Grigory Kalinovsky at Jacobs
- Heifetz 2016: Grigory Kalinovsky & Michael Shaham | Shostakovich: Pieces for 2 Violins & Piano - 2016
- Keshet Eilon Live: Masterclass with Grigory Kalinovsky - Monday, August 7th, 2017
