= Made to Last =

Made to Last may refer to:

- Made to Last, a memoir by John Kenneth Galbraith, 1964
- Made to Last: The story of Britain's best-known shoe firm, a 2013 book about Clarks Shoes
- "Made to Last", song by Issues from Headspace
- A durable good, a good that does not quickly wear out

== See also ==
- Built to Last (disambiguation)
