= Farlinger =

Farlinger is a surname. Notable people with the surname include:

- John Farlinger (born 1948), Canadian football player
- Leonard Farlinger, Canadian film director, producer, and screenwriter

== See also ==
- Farlinger building, a former National Register of Historic Places (National Register of Historic Places listings in Fulton County, Georgia) listed building at 343 Peachtree NE. in Atlanta designed by George W. Laine
