= George Bornoff =

Canadian violinist and string teacher

Left hand finger patterns, after George Bornoff

George Bornoff (5 November 1907 – 1998) was a Canadian violinist and string teacher. He notably developed the method of string teaching bearing his name, the Bornoff Method, which emphasizes an early focus on five patterns of half- and whole-steps formed by the fingers of the left hand. His book on violin instruction, Bornoff's Finger Patterns for Violin, was published by Thompson, C. Fischer in 1948. In 1974 he was awarded the Distinguished Service Award from the American String Teachers Association.

== Life and career ==
Born in Winnipeg, Manitoba, Bornoff studied in his native city with Gus Hughes (1916–18), John Waterhouse (1919–20), I.S. Garbovitsky (1922-4), and Jean de Rimanoczy (1925-8). He was a member of the Winnipeg Symphony Orchestra from 1923 to 1936 and served as concertmaster of the Winnipeg String Orchestra from 1925 to 1928. He also played in the orchestras of the CKY and CJRC radio stations from 1934 to 1943 and played regularly in orchestras at the CRBC and CBC from 1925 to 1943. He also played throughout Western Canada as a concert violinist.

In 1937 Bornoff founded the Bornoff School of Music in Winnipeg, serving as the school's director until 1947. His wife, pianist and contralto Mary Ada Baron Bornoff, taught with him at the school. He then taught violin and chamber music at Columbia University in New York City from 1945 to 1953. He became Professor of Music Education at Boston University in 1953 where he taught for the next two decades. In 1973 he was appointed professor emeritus at BU and that same year joined the violin faculty at the Boston Conservatory. In 1980 he became executive director of the Foundation for the Advancement of String Education. He died in Boston in 1998. Among his notable pupils are Lloyd Blackman, J. Chalmers Doane, Donna Grescoe, Stanley Kolt, Michael A. Levine, Joseph M. Woods and Gerald Stanick.

== See also ==
- Playing the violin
