= Mel Smith (Canadian football) =

Canadian football player (born 1949)

Profile
- Positions: Offensive lineman, Offensive end

Personal information
- Born: 1949 (age 76–77)
- Listed height: 6 ft 2 in (1.88 m)
- Listed weight: 205 lb (93 kg)

Career information
- University: Alberta
- CFL draft: 1971: 1st round, 4th overall pick

Career history
- 1972: Winnipeg Blue Bombers

Awards and highlights
- Hec Crighton Trophy (1971)

Mel Smith (born 1949) is a Canadian former professional football player for the Winnipeg Blue Bombers of the Canadian Football League (CFL).

Smith played football with the Edmonton Wildcats before playing at the university level with the University of Alberta, winning the Vanier Cup with them in 1967. He was awarded the Hec Crighton Trophy in 1971 as the most outstanding football player in university sports, the first player from the west to be awarded it. Smith was also named as the best player in the Western Canadian Intercollegiate Athletic Association (WCIAA) in that same year, and was a three-time WCIAA all-star. Smith was drafted by the Edmonton Eskimos in the first round of the 1971 CFL draft. He signed a contract with the Eskimos in December 1971, but did not play any games with them. He later played one game with the Winnipeg Blue Bombers during the 1972 season.
