= Richmond Delta Youth Orchestra =

Canadian orchestral training program

The Richmond Delta Youth Orchestra (RDYO) is an orchestral training program for young musicians located in Richmond, British Columbia, Canada. The RDYO was formerly known as the Delta Youth Orchestra. The name was changed in March 2013. In September 2014, it moved its base to Richmond, British Columbia. It previously rehearsed at the Ladner Community Centre, 4734 - 51st Street, Delta, British Columbia. The RDYO is sponsored by the BC Youth Music Society (formerly the Delta Symphony Society which is a registered non-profit charity and the society provides this orchestral and chamber music training program for young musicians from ages 5 to 24 years. The Orchestra was founded in 1971 by Harry Gomez, Fred Preuss, Charles Glushka, Anita Sleeman, and Aileen Docherty.

== Orchestral divisions ==
The orchestral program has several divisions:

- Beginning violin program – in conjunction with the City of Richmond, the RDYO offers beginning class violin instruction.
- Junior Strings – This is a junior ensemble with students in elementary school, RCM Grades III – V
- Intermediate Strings – This is a junior ensemble with students in elementary school, RCM Grades IV – VII
- Senior Strings – Students in elementary school to junior high age. String orchestra repertoire with some full orchestra repertoire when the group combines with the wind ensemble
- Junior Wind Ensemble – wind and brass players in senior elementary or junior high school.
- Senior Wind Ensemble – This is a concert band program, Students middle to senior high school age, RCM Grade VI – VIII
- Symphony Orchestra – full symphony orchestra up to age 24. Senior high school and university students make up the bulk of this group with a minimum requirement of RCM Grade IX for entry.
- Chamber Ensembles – small chamber groups composed of members of the Symphony Orchestra.

== History ==
The Delta Youth Orchestra was founded in September 1971 by the Delta Symphony Society. Under the musical direction of Mr. Harry Gomez, a well-known music teacher and conductor of youth orchestras, the Delta Youth orchestra started in 1971 with 36 players in the orchestra. Gomez held the position until his death in 1983. Lloyd Blackman took over as music director in 1985 and held the position until June 1995. Wallace Leung was music director from 1995 to 2000, and the current Music Director is Mr. Stephen Robb (2001–present).

Ten years after founding the youth orchestra, the Delta Symphony Society founded the Delta Conservatory of Music in 1981. In 1983, the school became a separate society and became the Delta Institute of The Arts, and later became the Delta Community Music School.

The RDYO is a member of the Association of Canadian Orchestras (Orchestras Canada), Delta Arts Council, and Richmond Chamber of Commerce.
