= Anita Sleeman =

Canadian composer

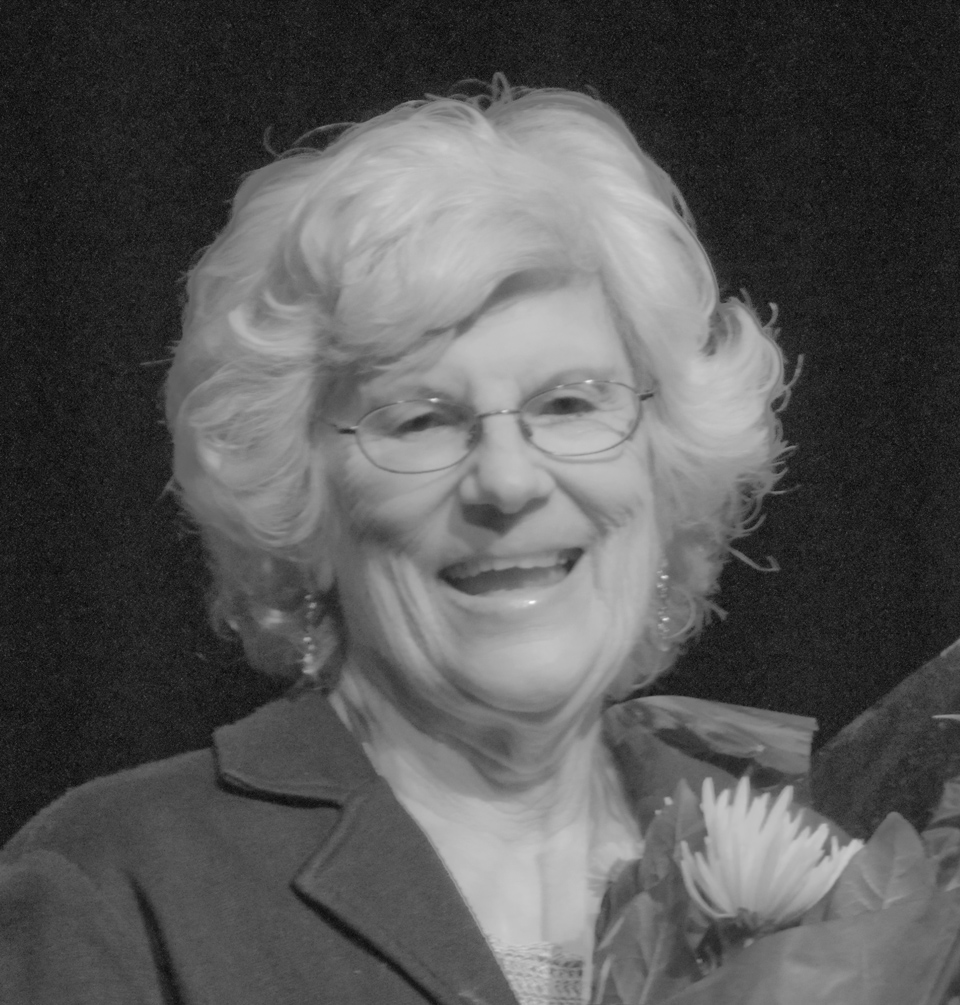
Anita Andrés Sleeman

Anita Sleeman (née Andrés) (December 12, 1930 – October 18, 2011) was a Canadian contemporary classical music composer. She was also a conductor, arranger, educator, and performer.

== Biography ==
=== Life ===
Born Anita Andrés December 12, 1930, in San Jose, California, to Alejandro Andrés from Salamanca, Spain, and Anita Dolgoff from Stavropol, Russia, Sleeman began taking piano lessons at age three and took up trumpet and French horn at school in San Francisco. While there, her music teachers noted her exceptional abilities at an early age (she began to show a talent for composition at age eight). Sleeman attended Placer Junior College as a music student. She met her future husband, Evan Sleeman, in Placer County and they married in 1951. They purchased a ranch in Elko County, Nevada, and along with their six children immigrated to Canada in 1963. They lived on a ranch in the remote Anahim Lake area near Bella Coola. In 1967, the couple relocated to Tsawwassen, Metropolitan Vancouver. Throughout her life she played the French horn in a variety of stage and concert bands and performed as a keyboardist in jazz ensembles.

=== Career ===
At age 19 Sleeman composed a march that was played at her community college's commencement in 1950 (the first public performance of her work). Sleeman taught music appreciation at the Anahim Lake elementary school. While in Anahim Lake she played piano and organ at many community gatherings. Sleeman resumed music studies at the University of British Columbia, earning a BMus in 1971, and MMus (on a graduate fellowship) in 1974. At UBC she was a pupil of Jean Coulthard and during that time she taught at the electronic music lab, co-founded the Delta Youth Orchestra, and was involved in the establishment of the music program at the Capilano College in North Vancouver as a member of its music faculty. She returned to California to complete her doctorate (1982) at the University of Southern California attending master classes with Luciano Berio, Luigi Nono, and Charles Wuorinen. She also attended the Dick Grove School of Jazz. For 17 years she served as musical director and conductor of West Vancouver's Ambleside Orchestra, retiring in 2010.

Her compositions have been premiered in London, England and Fiuggi, Italy as well as in Ottawa, Windsor and Vancouver; commissions include CBC Radio, Vancouver Community College, the Delta Youth Orchestra, the Galiano Trio, and others. At an early age Sleeman was introduced to the music of Olivier Messiaen, whose inspiration has been important in her development. Other influences are Varèse, Stravinsky, Koechlin, Lígeti, and Bartók. Her diversity of style has also been enhanced by her Spanish and Russian background and her love of jazz. She admired the work of Frank Zappa, to whose memory she dedicated selected performances of her work.

=== List of additional performances ===
- February 1997: The Galiano Trio (flute, clarinet, bassoon) presented a concert of Sleeman's works, as part of the Little Chamber Series That Could season. This performance featured her Legend of the Lions and was enhanced by dance, and projected scene design by her daughter Cynthia Sleeman.
- September 1997: Sleeman was selected to represent Canada at the Donna in Musica festival in Fiuggi, Italy.
- September 1999: Picasso Gallery II was chosen for performance at the International Association of Women in Music Festival in London, England.
- January 2002: Cantigas (commissioned by ACWC) was premiered in Ottawa by the Quatuor Arthur- Leblanc at the Then, Now and Beyond series sponsored jointly by Association of Canadian Women Composers and the Ottawa Chamber Music Society. The performance piece was repeated August 6, 2002, at the Ottawa Chamber Music Festival, again performed by the Quatuor Arthur-Leblanc, in the presence of Her Excellency the Governor-General Adrienne Clarkson.
- July 2006: a new piece commissioned for the CBC, Rhapsody on Themes by Dohnányi, was premiered in Ottawa, Ontario, at the Ottawa Chamber Music Festival, and performed again in 2007.

=== Death ===
Sleeman died early in the morning of October 18, 2011, at her home in North Vancouver, British Columbia. A memorial service for her was held on November 26, 2011, at St. Christopher's Anglican Church, West Vancouver.

== Critical reception ==
Critic Ken Winters of The Globe and Mail praised Sleeman's work Cantigas as "remarkable", continuing, "It's as resourceful as Bartók in exploiting string techniques and sound potentials, and just as vigorous musically."

== See also ==
- Music of Canada
- List of Canadian composers
- List of Canadian musicians
