= Tim Hus =

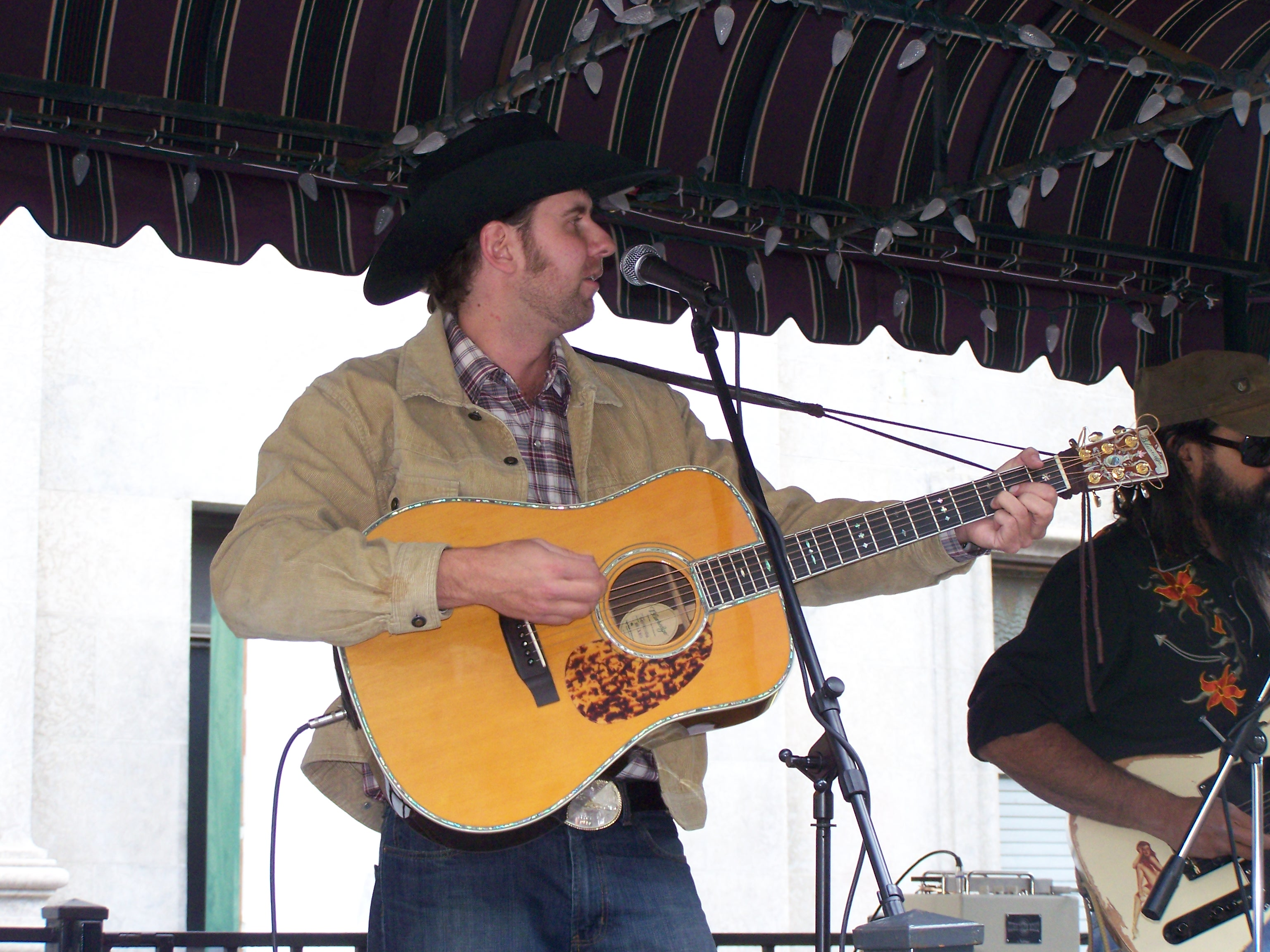
- Tim Hus performing on Stephen Avenue Mall in Calgary, Alberta

Background information
- Born: 1979 (age 46–47)
- Genres: Country, folk
- Occupations: Singer-songwriter, musician
- Instruments: Vocals, guitar
- Label: Stony Plain Records
- Website: Tim Hus

Tim Hus (born in Nelson, British Columbia) is a Canadian country/folk singer, based out of Calgary, Alberta, Canada.

Hus and his Travelin' Band, which includes bull fiddler Riley Tubbs, Billy MacInnis on lead guitar and fiddle, and occasionally Pat Phillips on drums, have toured from coast to coast performing their true Canadian music. His music is coined as "Canadiana Cowboy Music" and tells tales of the Historic West and those who formed it. Tim has shared the stage with many other great talents such as Canadian legend Stompin' Tom Connors, Ian Tyson, Tim Harwill and Gary Fjellgaard and worked with Corb Lund on the song "Hurtin' Albertan".

He has worked as a carpenter's helper, framer, warehouse hand, forklift driver, van driver, treeplanter, brewery worker, beer truck driver, fruit picker, fisherman, pine cone picker, sawhand, cabinet maker, well driller, painter, courier, assembly line worker, salmon farmer, furniture mover, labourer, and a maintenance man.

In September 2016, Hus fell while helping a friend repair a roof, shattering his heel. During the resulting time in hospital, somebody used Hus's identity to open several credit card accounts.

He is married to anthropologist Janelle Baker. They have two sons.

== Discography ==
- Songs of West Canada (2002)
- Alberta Crude (2004)
- Huskies and Husqvarnas (2006)
- Bush Pilot Buckaroo (2008)
- Hockeytown (2010)
- Western Star (2013)
