= John Waterhouse (violinist) =

Canadian musician

John Fereday Preston Waterhouse (28 October 1877 – 22 May 1970) was a Canadian violinist, conductor, and music educator.

== Biography ==
Born in Bilston, West Midlands, he was educated at the Royal Academy of Music (RAM) where he was a pupil of Émile Sauret (violin), Ebenezer Prout (counterpoint), and Stewart Macpherson (harmony). He was later named a Fellow of the RAM in 1947. He began his career in England working as a concert violinist, orchestral player, and conductor. During this time he married his wife Cecilia who was a pianist that had been trained by a pupil of Clara Schumann. Their son William Waterhouse also became a notable violinist and pedagogue.

In late 1912, Waterhouse left England for the United States to join the Minneapolis Symphony Orchestra. He left that post in 1914 to move to Winnipeg, Manitoba, Canada. He lived in Winnipeg for the rest of his life, spending more than five decades teaching and performing in that city. He was responsible for introducing works by several English composers to the city. From 1923 to 1927 he conducted the Winnipeg Orchestral Club and from 1934 to 1936 he conducted the Winnipeg String Orchestra. He was named an honorary member of the Manitoba Music Educators Association, the Manitoba Registered Music Teachers' Association, and the Winnipeg Men's Music Club. In 1965 he was awarded an honorary doctorate from the University of Manitoba, and in 1967 the Canadian Federation of Music Teachers' Associations honored him and five other recipients with a centennial citation. His notable students included Lloyd Blackman, George Bornoff, Frederick Grinke, Hugo Rignold, Gwen Thompson, and his son William.
