= Gwen Thompson =

Canadian violinist and music educator (born 1947)

Gwendoline Linda Louise Thompson CM (born 30 March 1947) is a Canadian violinist and music educator. She has been a member of two notable chamber music ensembles with whom she has made several commercial recordings: the Masterpiece Trio (1977–1988) and Viveza, the latter of which she formed in 1989 with Lee Duckles (cello), Wilmer Fawcett (double-bass), Mark Koenig (violin), and Linda Lee Thomas (piano). She has also appeared in concert as a soloist with several Canadian orchestras, including the Vancouver Symphony Orchestra, Victoria Symphony and the British Columbia Chamber Orchestra.

Thompson was appointed a Member of the Order of Canada in 2003.

== Early life and education ==
Thompson was born and grew up in Winnipeg, Manitoba, and began her violin studies as a child in her native city where she was a pupil of S. C. Eckhardt-Gramatté, Frank Simmons, and John Waterhouse. As a teenager she was a member of the National Youth Orchestra of Canada from 1961 until 1966, notably serving as its concertmaster during her final year which included a European tour. She also played in both the Winnipeg Symphony Orchestra and the CBC Winnipeg Orchestra in 1963–1964.

In 1965 Thompson entered the Jacobs School of Music at Indiana University Bloomington where she was a pupil of violinist Josef Gingold and earned a Bachelor of Music and performer's cetrificat in violin performance in 1969. While a student there she notably toured Western Canada with pianist Diedre Irons in 1966–1967 in concerts sponsored by the Jeunesses Musicales International (JMI) of Canada and served as associate concertmaster of the orchestra of the JMI in Paris in 1967. She later studied music privately with Ivan Galamian and Jascha Heifetz in the United States.

== Orchestra London Canada ==
In 1971 Thompson became the concertmaster of the Orchestra London Canada and joined the music faculty at the University of Western Ontario. She remained in both posts until 1975 when she was appointed the head of the string department at the Vancouver Academy of Music, a position she held until 1998. She also taught on the music faculty of the University of British Columbia from 1975 to 1983. She has also been highly active as a teacher of master classes and as a competition adjudicator in both Canada and the United States.
