= Built to Last (disambiguation) =

Built to Last is a 1989 album by the Grateful Dead.

Built to Last may also refer to:

- Durability
- Durable good
- Built to Last: Successful Habits of Visionary Companies, 1994 management book
- Built to Last (TV series), 1997 NBC sitcom

Other albums:

- Built to Last (HammerFall album), 2016
- Built to Last (Hogan's Heroes album), 1988
- Built to Last (Maestro album), 1998
- Built to Last, a 2006 album by Damian Marshall
- Built to Last (The Rippingtons album), 2012
- Built to Last (Sick of It All album), 1997

Songs:

- "Built to Last" (Grateful Dead song), 1989
- "Built to Last" (Mêlée song), 2007
