= Hugh Ross (musician) =

Hugh C. M. Ross (c. 1898 – 20 January 1990, in Manhattan, New York City, age 91), was a choral director and conductor of the Schola Cantorum of New York, United States.

He was born in Langport, Somerset, England, the son of David Melville Ross, the canon of Wells Cathedral. A student of organ, piano and violin, he became a fellow of the Royal College of Organists at 17, the youngest ever. He was an artillery officer in France during World War I but continued studying at the Royal College of Music and at Oxford University.

After being employed as the conductor of the Winnipeg Choir in Canada, in 1927 he moved to New York to lead the Schola Cantorum. In 1933 he became a professor at the Manhattan School of Music. He also served on the faculty of Queens College, City University of New York. One of his notable students was Filmer Hubble.
