= Lorne Betts =

Canadian composer and conductor

Lorne Matheson Betts (August 2, 1918 – August 5, 1985) was a Canadian composer, conductor, organist, and music critic. A member of the Canadian League of Composers and an associate of the Canadian Music Centre, many of his original scores and writings are part of the collection at the National Library of Canada. His compositional output includes two operas, two symphonies, two piano concertos, three string quartets, many songs and choral pieces, and other orchestral and chamber works.

== Life and career ==
Born in Winnipeg, Manitoba, Betts began his musical training in his native city with W.H. Anderson, Filmer Hubble, and Hunter Johnston. He was one of the founding singers in Anderson's The Choristers in 1936. He went to England where he earned a Licentiate of the Royal Schools of Music in 1941. In 1947 he entered The Royal Conservatory of Music where he studied music composition with John Weinzweig through 1953. He also studied with Ernst Krenek, Alan Rawsthorne, and Roy Harris during the summers of 1950-1953.

Betts served as the music director of St Paul's Presbyterian Church in Hamilton, Ontario from 1950-1964. He was then organist-choirmaster at Melrose United Church in Hamilton for many years. He served as the director of the Royal Hamilton College of Music from 1953-1959 and was music critic for The Hamilton Spectator from 1965-1979. He was married to contralto Jean Macleod, notably serving as her accompanist on three commercial recordings. He died in Hamilton at the age of 67.
