= Teresa McDonell =

Teresa McDonell (February 9, 1833 or 1835 – November 4, 1917) was a Canadian Catholic nun, educator and nurse. She took the name Sainte-Thérèse.

== Early life ==
McDonell was the daughter of Angus McDonell and Margaret McDonald, born in St Andrews, Upper Canada. Her mother died while she was still young and she was temporarily raised by an aunt.

== Early career ==
After McDonell received her first communion, she was placed in the convent of the Sisters of Charity of Bytown. She joined the order in 1851 and took her vows in March 1853. In 1855, she was sent to the Red River Colony, where a community of nuns had been established by Marie-Louise Valade; she was expected to return after three years. She was in charge of the pharmacy and also taught school. In August 1859, she began the long trip back east. On the second day, a group of Métis led by Louis Riel, Sr. surrounded the cart in which she was travelling and refused to let her go.

== Career ==
She went on to teach school in St Vital, St Norbert and St François Xavier. She helped establish the Académie Sainte-Marie in Upper Fort Garry (later Winnipeg) in 1869. While teaching, she also served as superior for the convents at St Norbert, St François Xavier and St. Vital. She set up a temporary hospital in 1871 which later developed into St. Boniface General Hospital.

== Death ==
McDonell died in St. Boniface in 1917.
