= Herbert Belyea =

Warren Herbert Belyea (22 December 1917 – 4 August 2001) was a Canadian composer, choir conductor, poet, and music educator. As a composer he was commissioned to write works by the Manitoba Arts Council, the city of Winnipeg, and several choirs. Several of his compositions were published by Frederick Harris Music. Twelve of his compositions are now available at Cypress Choral Music. As a poet, he has published works using the pseudonym A.C. Darke.

== Life and career ==
Born in Winnipeg, Manitoba, Belyea earned a Bachelor of Arts from St. John's College, University of Manitoba in 1948, a Bachelor of Education from the University of Manitoba (UM) in 1953, and a Master of Education from the UM in 1961. He studied singing and conducting privately with W.H. Anderson. He began his career serving overseas in the Canadian Army before serving as choirmaster at St Jude's Anglican Church in Winnipeg from 1952 to 1966. He later served in that same capacity at St Andrew's United Church during the 1970s. He joined the Education faculty at the University of Manitoba in 1967 where he taught for many years.

In 1969 Belyea became conductor of The Choristers after the death of conductor Filmer Hubble. He conducted the group until it disbanded in 1974, notably leading them in several performances broadcast nationally on CBC Radio. He also served as an adjudicator and clinician throughout Canada and in 1984 he was named a life member of the Manitoba Music Educators Association.
