= Donna Grescoe =

Canadian violinist

- Born: November 27, 1927; Winnipeg, Manitoba
- Died: August 17, 2012 (aged 84); Richmond, British Columbia

Donna Grescoe (27 November 1927 – 17 August 2012) was a Canadian violinist and educator who was known as a child prodigy for her proficiency on the violin.

Grescoe was born in Winnipeg, Manitoba on November 17, 1927. She began playing violin at five years of age after her parents bought a fiddle from a door-to-door salesman. When she was 10 years old she received a scholarship to study at the American Conservatory of Music in Chicago. She later moved to New York City where she studied with New York Philharmonic concertmaster Mishel Piastro. She made her performing debut in the city at Town Hall in 1947 and went on to perform at Carnegie Hall on January 30, 1948.

Lyn Cook's book "The Little Magic Fiddler" (1951) recounts Grecoe's childhood in Winnipeg.

Grescoe died August 17, 2012, at the age of 84 in Richmond, British Columbia.
