= Błaszczyk =

Błaszczyk, Błaszczak, Blaščik, Blaščak, Blashchuk, or Blashchak Blasscyk is a surname.

The surname is derived from Slavic diminutives of the given name Blasius. Błaszczyk and Błaszczak are the standard Polish variants, with Błaszczyk about four times more common. A variant with a Ukrainian/Belarusian ending (-uk) is found at a lower frequency in Poland, mainly in the east.

Language	Masculine	Feminine
Czech, Slovak	Blaščik; Blaščík; Blaščak	Blaščiková; Blaščíková; Blaščaková
Polish	Błaszczyk (Polish pronunciation: [ˈbwaʂtʂɨk]); Błaszczak (Polish pronunciation: [ˈbwaʂtʂak])	
Ukrainian (Romanization)	Блащук (Blashchuk, Blaščuk)	

== People ==
- Mariusz Błaszczak (born 1969), Polish politician
- Ewa Błaszczyk (born 1955), Polish actress
- Grzegorz Błaszczyk (born 1953), Polish historian
- Lucjan Błaszczyk (born 1974), Polish table tennis player
- Iwona Blazwick (born 1955), British art critic, director of the Whitechapel Art Gallery
