= Tim Harwill =

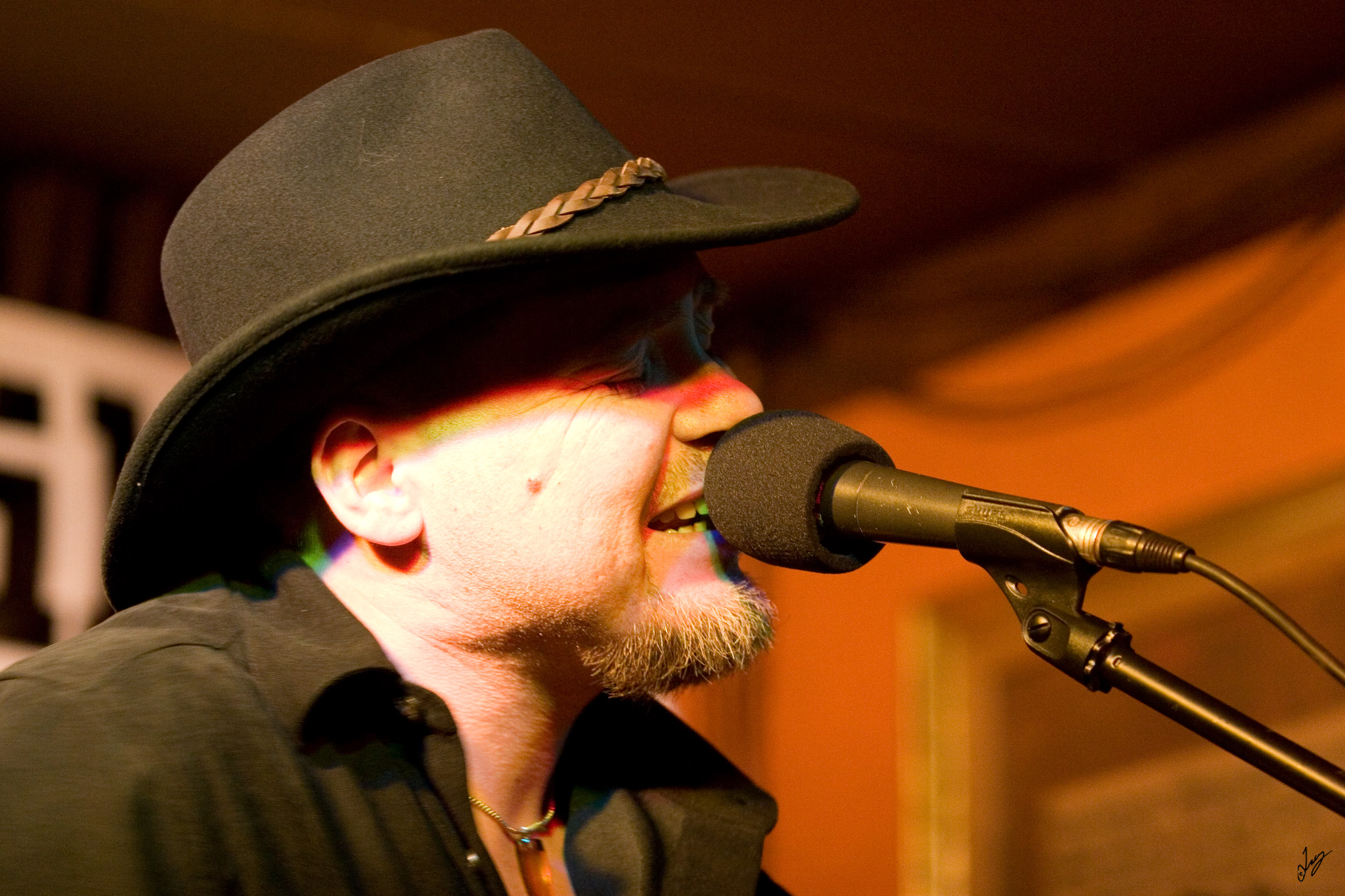

Background information
- Genres: Outlaw Country, Americana
- Instruments: Vocals, Guitar, Harmonica
- Years active: 1998–Present
- Labels: The Sterling Label, Angel Records Canada, Harwill Music
- Website: timharwill.com

Tim Harwill is a Métis-Canadian outlaw country singer/songwriter, based in Thorsby, Alberta.

== Music career ==
Harwill's toured for decades as both solo artist and bandleader. To date, he's released 8 albums, either independently or on a series of micro-labels. Often billed as ‘The 12-String Troubadour’, he toured North America performing an eclectic and personal blend of music in a signature vocal style. His music is identified as "Americana" and tells non-conformist tales of people and places encountered while living out scores of adventures on the lost highway. A working musician through most of his career, Harwill shared the stage and studio with many great talents including 'Godfather' of Americana music James Talley, seminal outlaw country singer/songwriter Steve Young, and rising Canadiana country star Tim Hus. He was joined by legendary Alberta country musicians Alfie Myhre and Richard Chernesky on 2012 studio release 'A Tribute to Catfish John'. His 2014 album release 'Dance Floor' meanwhile earned significant radio success in North America by placing two singles in the US Top 10 including the #1 Americana hit 'I Love My Dog' and the #7 Americana single 'Like Me & You'. A collection of 11 new songs written by Harwill, the 'Dance Floor' recording spent 5 weeks in the Americana Album charts in 2015, reaching #6 in the US and #3 in Canada. After an eight year hiatus, with long-time music partner Mike Beley, he reformed the Harwill band to release the digital album 'Still Nineteen' in 2022.

== Personal life ==
While on extended hiatus from the music business, he returned to his first love, and soon made a name for himself as a novelist and writer, under his family name of T.F. Pruden. As of 2024, he's published seven (7) novels, and spent several years writing a monthly column for cannabis and counter-culture publication High Canada Magazine. Legendarily reclusive, the outlaw raconteur and former pro boxer lives quietly in small town Alberta.

== Discography ==
=== Albums ===
1998	Spinner Of Tales*
2005	Thru The Bottom Of A Glass
2006	All I Really Need
2009	The Wander Man Revisited
2011	Somethings Old, New, Borrowed & True
2012	A Tribute to Catfish John
2014	Dance Floor
2022	Still Nineteen *

* As lead vocalist of the Harwill band
