= Death of Jaylene Redhead =

2009 child abuse case in Canada

Nicole Redhead
- Born: 1983 (age 42–43); Manitoba
- Citizenship: Canadian
- Occupation: Sex worker
- Known for: Infanticide, Filicide
- Children: 3
- Criminal charges: Manslaughter
- Penalty: 12 years in prison (2011-2023)

Details
- Victims: daughter Jaylene Redhead-Sanderson

Nicole Redhead is a mother convicted of the 2009 manslaughter of her own 21-month-old daughter, Jaylene Redhead-Sanderson (October 16, 2007—June 29, 2009), in Winnipeg, Manitoba, Canada. Jaylene's death led to extensive public criticism regarding the monitoring of vulnerable children in Canada.

== Background ==
As a child, Nicole Redhead saw her own mother murder her father. In the aftermath, she was shuttled through five foster homes, sexually assaulted, and later became addicted to crack cocaine, taking up prostitution in order to supplement her addiction. Like her daughter would be, Redhead was born with fetal alcohol spectrum disorder.

Redhead's first two children were taken from her by Manitoba Child and Family Services.

== Jaylene Redhead-Sanderson ==
Jaylene Redhead-Sanderson
- Born: Jaylene Star Sanderson-Redhead; October 16, 2007; Winnipeg, Manitoba
- Died: June 29, 2009 (aged 1); Winnipeg, Manitoba
- Cause of death: smothering
- Citizenship: Canadian
- Known for: death by maternal infanticide
- Relatives: Nicole Redhead (mother); Skye Sanderson (paternal grandmother)

Nicole Redhead gave birth to her third child, Jaylene Star Sanderson-Redhead, in 2007. Jaylene was born going through drug withdrawal, and also had fetal alcohol spectrum disorder. Social workers removed Jaylene after she was born, due to concerns about her wellbeing if left in her mother's care.

In late 2008, social workers agreed a supervision plan to have Jaylene returned to her mother on condition that the pair live at the Native Women’s Transition Centre (also known as Awasis) in Winnipeg, so that they could be monitored. The judge who oversaw the inquest into Jaylene's death questioned the wisdom of this decision, particularly given that Redhead had previously failed to show sufficient progress to have her first two children returned to her custody.

After moving into the shelter with her daughter, Redhead began to consume large amounts of crack cocaine and beat Jaylene. The inquest report into Jaylene's death found that the pair were poorly monitored by social workers and centre staff, none of whom noticed what was happening. Redhead was given leave to her community, to live with her mother, which gave her free access to drugs with no supervision.

In June 2009, just six months after being reunited with her daughter, and after having inflicted repeated sustained beatings upon her during that period, Redhead killed Jaylene by smothering her. She refused to inform police, but once her boyfriend, Preston Tran (then an inmate at Headingley Correctional Institution) discovered what she had done, he alerted the Winnipeg Police Service. Jaylene Sanderson-Redhead was documented as the 14th homicide in Winnipeg of 2009.

== Conviction and aftermath ==
Redhead pleaded guilty to manslaughter, admitting she killed her daughter in a fit of rage. The defence attorney asked for leniency on the grounds of Redhead's traumatic upbringing, and stated that she was prone to violent behaviour since she had seen her mother kill her father at a drinking party at the age of nine. However, the prosecution emphasised to the jury that Jaylene had suffered more than 30 injuries in the days prior to her death, including bites on her legs, swollen genitalia and kicks.

Redhead was convicted and sentenced to 12 years imprisonment, which is what the prosecution had requested. Due to credit for time already served, this equated to a further 8 years and 8 months imprisonment.

The trial caused such an uproar in Canada that it was debated in the provincial legislature, and an inquest found 14 recommendations in order to prevent another tragedy like this from happening. The Office of the Children's Advocate of Manitoba was involved in the inquest and provided the Special Investigative Report. The panel lambasted the Native Women's Transition Centre in Winnipeg, with Justice Larry Allen stating that "there does not appear to be any point to sending drug/alcohol addicted mothers to supposed 'safe houses' if these people are going to have free access to the community without making sure that their sobriety is tested". The paternal grandmother of Jaylene Redhead stated that her life will never be the same after the murder, stating "God gave us these kids to look after them, not destroy them".
