= Violin technique =

Details of violin playing technique

Playing the violin entails holding the instrument between the jaw and the collar bone (see below for variations of this posture). The strings are sounded either by drawing the bow across them (arco), or by plucking them (pizzicato). The left hand regulates the sounding length of the strings by stopping them against the fingerboard with the fingers, producing different pitches.

== Posture ==
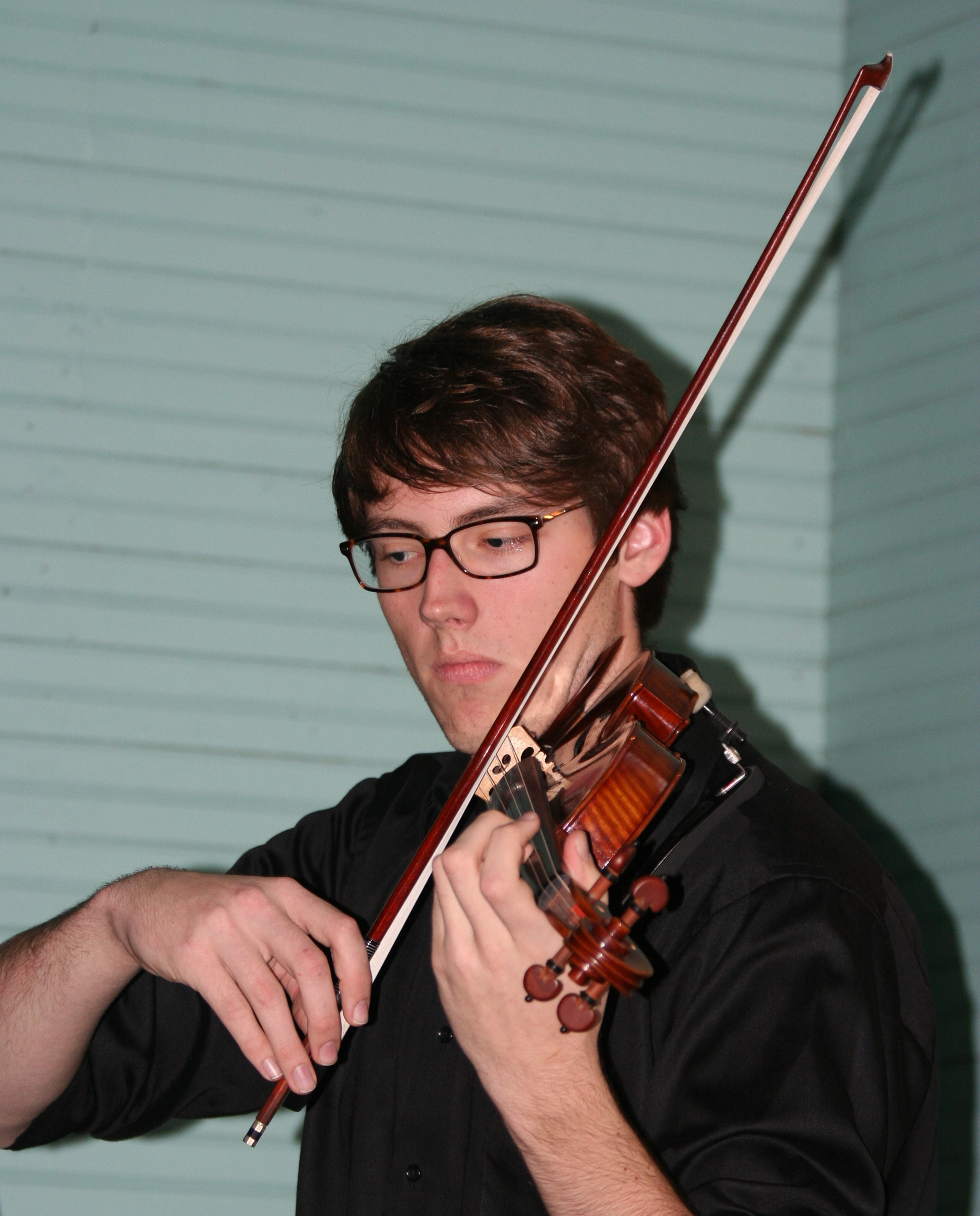
A man playing the violin

It is possible to play the violin holding it in a variety of ways. Most players hold the lower bout of the instrument between the left shoulder and the jaw, often assisted by a semi-permanently attached chinrest and detachable shoulder rest. If held properly under the chin, the violinist can let go of the instrument with their hands and it will stay there firmly. Other common ways to hold the instrument include the seated Carnatic attitude, with the scroll resting on a foot, or the dancing-master's "kit" or "pochette" hold, along the forearm, by the lower margin of the rib cage, even though these are not widely traditional holds. Historically, the baroque violin may have been frequently held without the chin and is often held this way by performers of historical music today. In Morocco the violin is often held completely upright resting on the seated player's thigh with the left hand stabilizing the balance while fingering.

The chin rest and shoulder rest accessories come in a great variety of styles and shapes, so each individual may find the combination that best suits their build and playing style. The search for the ideal combination can be a lengthy one in some cases. Whatever the equipment, the player will usually aim to maintain a balanced, natural, and comfortable attitude, with the spine straight, especially the neck. Many violinists have a reddish mark on the neck, the so-called "violin hickey" (or "fiddler's hickey") from long-term pressure at that spot. The spot may be aggravated by an allergic reaction to nickel plating on the chinrest clamp hardware, or by microbial pathogens present on the instrument.

Keeping the left wrist relaxed and nearly "straight" allows freedom of finger motion, and reduces the chance of repetitive strain injury. Collapsing the wrist to "support" the violin with the heel of the hand is an unfortunate habit that many novice players fall into, and may take years of constant vigilance to overcome. The left forearm will be rather extremely supinated, and the left elbow drawn medially, or to the right. Players may sometimes be advised to bring their left elbow to where they can see it, to reach the lower strings more easily.

Raising either shoulder beyond a naturally relaxed position is an easy habit to acquire without noticing it. Like any other unwarranted tension, it limits freedom of motion, and increases the risk of discomfort, while decreasing sound quality. It is useful to pay attention to the "square" formed by the right arm and bow, keeping it in a flat plane, and noticing which parts "lead" in string-crossing motions.

== Left hand: producing pitch ==
Left hand finger patterns, after George Bornoff

First position fingerings

While beginning violin students often rely on tapes or markers placed on the fingerboard for correct placement of the left-hand fingers, more proficient and experienced players place their fingers on the right spots without such indications but from practice and experience. To attain good intonation, violin players train their fingers to land in the right places, learning to hear when a pitch is in or out of tune, and cultivating the ability to correct the pitch rapidly and automatically as they are being played. "Singing" the pitch mentally helps to land in the right spot. (In practice, intonation may be checked by sounding an adjacent open string, and listening for the interval between the two notes.) Although adjusting to the desired pitch after landing the finger is indeed possible, the amount of adjustment needed may be greatly reduced by training the fingers to fall properly in the first place.

The fingers are conventionally numbered 1 (index finger) to 4 (little finger). Especially in instructional editions of violin music, numbers over the notes may indicate which finger to use, with "0" above the note indicating "open" string, or playing on a string without manipulating the pitch using the left hand. The second finger may be either "low" or "high," corresponding to G or G♯ on the E string in first position (no fingers on the string). Similarly, the first finger may reach a half-step down for the F, and the 3rd and 4th fingers reach up for A♯ and C respectively, as shown on the chart of Bornoff finger patterns on the left. (Pattern number five may be seen to be the same as pattern number three, but a half step lower, or in "half position".)

The lower chart on the left shows the arrangement of notes reachable in first position. Left-hand finger placement is a matter of the ears and hand, not the eyes, that is, it has strong aural and tactile/kinesthetic components, with visual references being only marginally useful. Also (not shown on this chart), the spacing between note positions becomes closer as the fingers move "up" (in pitch) from the nut. The blue bars on the sides of the chart represent the usual possibilities for beginners' tape placements, at 1st, high 2nd, 3rd (and 4th) fingers, or Bornoff pattern number two. This particular pattern results in an A major scale on the A and E strings, which is a natural start for simple tunes like "Twinkle Twinkle Little Star".

=== Positions ===
The placement of the left hand on the fingerboard is characterized by "positions". First position, where most beginners start (some methods start in third position) is nearest to the nut, or scroll end, and furthest from the player's face. The lowest note available in this position in standard tuning is an open G; the highest notes in first position are stopped with the fourth finger on the E-string, sounding a B.

Thus, in first position, the first finger placed on the E-string gives an F♯; from this position, the second finger can play a G or a G♯, the third finger an A, and - as previously mentioned - the fourth a B. Positioning the first finger so when pressed it gives a G (still on the E-string) is called second position, from which position all the ascending notes up to C (by the fourth finger) may be played. Third position is achieved when the first finger presses down on an A, and so on, with fifth position on one string sounding the same notes as first position on the string above. There is also a "half position" where the first finger sounds a semitone above the open string and the other fingers a tone or semitone below their normal positions, e.g. (on the A string) A♯-B-C♯-D. The same notes could be played in first position with the first finger moving from "low first" (A♯) to B, but this would produce a sliding first finger, which is not always desirable.

The upper limit of the violin's range is largely determined by the skill of the player. A skilled player can play more than two octaves on a single string, and four octaves on the instrument as a whole. All except the lowest and highest notes can be played on multiple strings in different positions. That is, the "high" B note referred to above can be played not only by the fourth finger on the E-string in first position, but also by the fourth finger in fifth position on the A-string, in ninth position on the D-string, and thirteenth position on the G-string.

Violinists often change positions on the lower strings, sometimes to the consternation of composers and much to the confusion of beginners. This is usually done to handle a musical passage that would otherwise require fast switching (or "crossing") of strings. It is also done to produce a particular timbre: the same note will sound substantially different depending on which string is used to play it. That "high" B, when played on the E-string (the highest, usually a mono-core metal string) can have a clear, even piercing timbre; the same "high" B played on the A-string or D-string or G-string (usually wrapped strings rather than mono-core) may sound "warmer" or less abrasive. For this reason, violinists often avoid playing a single note on the E-string within a phrase of notes on the A-string, as one E-string note would stand out with a different timbre.

Different strings have different tone qualities, because of their different physical composition and their different resonances on the instrument. The choice of timbres on different strings is vital to the musicality of the instrument, and intermediate and advanced players will often deliberately play in a higher position on a lower string for effect. This effect is sometimes indicated by the composer or arranger. The most common indication uses the letter name of the string: for example, if a composer wants a passage that would otherwise be taken on the D-string to be played on the G-string, they write "sul G", "G-Saite", "auf G", "G corde", or "on G" in the part, the first two being the most commonly used notations. Occasionally, numbers or Roman numerals are used, so the example might be written "4. corde" or "IV corde" (as above, with the highest string being No. 1 and the lowest No. 4); the simplest way to indicate which string to play is to write the number (e.g., "IV" or "III") alone.

Audio sample
Violin sounds and techniques: 566 KB
- Open strings (arco and pizzicato)
- An A major scale (arco and pizzicato)
- Beginning of an A major scale with vibrato
- An A major scale played col legno
- A double stop
- Natural harmonics on the A string at the octave, octave, and a fifth and two octaves
- An artificial (false) harmonic produced on the E string
- Harmonic glissando on the A string
See media help for assistance with audio links.
See the Violins category at Wikimedia Commons for more media

=== Open strings ===
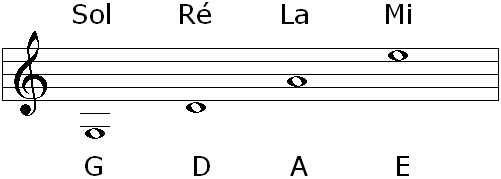
Violin open string notes.

A special timbre results from playing a note without touching its string with a finger, thus sounding the lowest note on that string. Such a note is said to be played on an open string. Open string notes (G, D, A, E) have a very distinct sound resulting from the absence of the damping action of a finger, and from the fact that vibrato (see below) is produced differently from on-fingered notes. Other than low G (which can be played in no other way), open strings are sometimes selected for special effects.

One striking effect that employs open strings is bariolage. This is the repeated alternation of notes played on two or more strings, where one of the notes is usually an open string. This string crossing is often rapid and is best executed with a sinuous movement of the bow arm. Sometimes the same pitch as an open string will be fingered on an adjacent string, so that the alternation is between the same note on two strings, one stopped, one open, giving a rhythmic pulsating effect. Bariolage was a favorite device of Joseph Haydn, who used it for example in his string quartet Opus 50 no. 6, and in the "Farewell" Symphony. It is also prominently featured in the Preludium of Bach's Partita No.3 in E major for solo violin.

Playing an open string simultaneously with a stopped note on an adjacent string produces a bagpipe-like a drone, often used by composers in imitation of folk music. Sometimes the two notes are identical (for instance, playing a fingered A on the D string against the open A string), giving a ringing sort of "fiddling" sound.

=== Double stops and drones ===
Double stopping is when stopped notes are played on two adjacent strings, producing a two-note harmony. This is more difficult than normal single-string playing, as fingers must be accurately placed on two strings simultaneously. Sometimes moving to a higher position is necessary for the left hand to be able to reach both notes at once. Double stopping is also used to mean playing on three or all four strings at once, although such practices are more properly called triple or quadruple stopping. Collectively, double, triple and quadruple stopping is called multiple stopping. However, triple or quadruple stopping is more commonly just called a chord. Sounding an open string alongside a fingered note is another way to get harmony. While sometimes also called a double stop, it is more properly called a drone, as the drone note (the open string) may be sustained for a passage of different notes played on the adjacent string.

=== Vibrato ===
Vibrato is a technique of the left hand and arm in which the pitch of a note varies in a pulsating rhythm. Mechanically, it is achieved by fingertip movements which alter the length of the vibrating string. There are several different styles of vibrato ranging from the use of just the fingers to the use of the wrist or even the whole forearm. By employing these different techniques both the speed and amplitude of vibrato oscillations can be varied for musical effect.

Vibrato is often perceived to create a more emotional sound, and it is employed heavily in music of the Romantic era. The acoustic effect of vibrato has largely to do with adding interest and warmth to the sound, in the form of a shimmer created by the variations in the projection of the strongest sound. A well-made violin virtually points its sound pattern in different directions depending on slight variations in pitch.

Violinists oscillate backward, or lower in pitch from the actual note when using vibrato, since aural perception favors the highest pitch in a varying sound. Vibrato does little if anything to disguise an out-of-tune note. Violin students, especially those of beginner level, are taught to use it only on extended notes and or during points of emotional tension. Vibrato can be difficult to learn and may take a student several months, if not years, to master.

=== Harmonics ===
Lightly touching the string with a fingertip at a harmonic node while bowing close to the bridge can create harmonics. For the harmonics to produce the most consistent tone and volume, the bow needs to be making longer faster strokes. Instead of the normal solid tone a wispy-sounding overtone note of a higher pitch is heard. Each node is at an integer division of the string, for example exactly halfway along the length of the string, or exactly one-third along the length of the string. The pitch produced in these two cases will be an octave higher in the case of halves, and an octave and a fifth higher in the case of the string vibrating in thirds. A responsive instrument will provide numerous possible harmonic nodes along the length of the string.

Harmonics are marked in music with a little circle above the note that determines the pitch of the harmonic. There are two types of harmonics: natural and artificial (also known as "false harmonics").

Artificial harmonics are more advanced than natural harmonics described above. Stopping a note on one string, for example, first finger "E" on the D string, and having another finger just touching the string a fourth higher, in this case on the position of the note "A", produces the fourth harmonic of the "E", sounding a tone two octaves above the note that is stopped, in this case, E. Finger placement and pressure, as well as bow speed, pressure, and sounding point are all essential in getting the desired harmonic to sound.

The "harmonic finger" can also touch at a major third above the pressed note or a fifth higher. These harmonics are less commonly used because they are more difficult to make sound well. In the case of the major third, the harmonic is higher in the overtone series, and does not speak as readily; in the case of the fifth, the stretch is greater than is comfortable for many violinists. The sounding pitch of the major third harmonic is two octaves and a major third above the lower note, and in the case of the fifth, it is an octave and a fifth above the lower note.

Traditional notation of artificial harmonics uses two notes on one stem: the lower note employs a round note-head representing where the string is strongly stopped with the first finger, and the upper note uses an open diamond note-head representing where the string is lightly touched with the fourth finger.

Harmonics are also rarely played in double stops, where both notes are harmonics.

Elaborate passages in artificial harmonics can be found in virtuoso violin literature, especially of the 19th and early 20th centuries.

== Right hand and tone color ==
The right arm, hand, and bow are responsible for tone quality, rhythm, dynamics, articulation, and certain (but not all) changes in timbre. The bow is held in the right hand with the thumb bent underneath the frog to support it and the other fingers loosely touching the wood. The middle and ring fingers are usually wrapped around the frog, although in some cases (such as in baroque performance practice) the whole hand holds the stick above the frog. Holding the little finger curved and resting on the near facet of the octagonal shape of the stick, next to the facet on top of the stick, allows that finger to "unweight" the bow, using the thumb as a fulcrum. Bowing action should be initiated and solely dependent upon movement of the right hand, not by the forearm, upper arm, and shoulder. Flexion and extension of these parts should be passive led by right hand action. Otherwise, subtle and delicate bowing control is impossible, leading to excessive tension in the right arm, making bow control difficult. This tension restricts the movement needed to play properly and will lead to a poor sound production. It is very important that the right arm remains relaxed in order to be flexible enough to move the bow properly.

=== Bowing techniques ===
Increasing pressure on the strings is the primary way to produce louder notes on the violin. Pressure is added mainly by the index finger of the bowing hand. Another method sometimes used to increase volume is using greater bow speed; however, a violinist can increase bow speed and still play softly at the same time. The two methods are not equivalent, because they produce different timbres; pressing down on the string tends to produce a focused, more intense sound.

The sounding point where the bow intersects the string also influences timbre. Playing close to the bridge (sul ponticello) gives a more intense sound than usual, emphasizing the higher harmonics; and playing with the bow over the end of the fingerboard (sul tasto) makes for a delicate, ethereal sound, emphasizing the fundamental frequency. Suzuki referred to the sounding point as the "Kreisler highway"; one may think of different sounding points as "lanes" in the highway.

There are several methods of "attack" with the bow that produce different articulations; this list is by no means exhaustive:

- Détaché - The term détaché simply means "separated" and it can be applied to any notes not linked by a slur. Stopping the bow on the string deadens the vibrations and thus creates a muted accent, elastic détaché which covered off-the-string strokes, and dragged détaché (détaché traîné) where smooth bow changes leave no audible gap between each note.
- Martelé (French; Italian martellato) - literally "hammered," is a type of détaché stroke with a lightly hammered attack. A strong attack is referred to as martellato.
- Collé - "stuck," or "glued," is a stroke that begins from a heavily weighted bow resting motionless on the string. Ideally, the initial weight will be almost enough to cause an undesirable scratch sound.
- Spiccato - Technique that uses a bowing style that leaves the string clearly to produce a light "bouncing" sound. Despite major misconceptions, violinists play this technique with a horizontal stroke; the "bouncing" motion is only due to the natural resistance of the violin string, resistance of the bow hair, and light weight of the stroke. Spiccato becomes sautillé at faster tempos, due to the lower amplitude of the "bounce". Spiccato is usually performed at the balance portion of the bow, which is the area of the bow where weight is distributed evenly on both sides, allowing for maximum control. Spiccato articulation is indicated by a small triangle directly under the note. Alternatively, spiccato can be indicated by a small dot under the note in conjunction with the word "spiccato".
- Legato - Of successive notes in performance, connected without any intervening silence of articulation. In practice, the connection or separation of notes is relative, and achieved through the presence or absence of emphasis, Accent and attack, as much as silences of articulation; degrees of connection and separation vary from legatissimo (representing the closest degree of connection), tenuto, portamento, legato, portato, non legato, mezzo-staccato, staccato (the natural antonym of legato), to staccatissimo. Some of these terms have connotations going beyond simple degrees of connection or separation.
- Sautillé (French; Italian saltando, German Springbogen, Spanish saltillo) - A bowstroke played rapidly in the middle of the bow, one bowstroke per note, so that the bow bounces very slightly off the string. If the bounce becomes higher at this speed, it is really a flying staccato or flying spiccato. It is not indicated in any consistent manner: sometimes dots are placed above or below the notes, sometimes arrow-head strokes, and sometimes the stroke is simply left to the performer's discretion. spiccato and sautillé are sometimes used as synonyms, though spiccato tends to be applied to a broader range of off-the-string strokes.
- Jeté - Also known as "ricochet" bowing, this consists of "throwing" the bow on the string in the upper third of the bow on a down bow, so that it bounces and produces a series of rapid notes. Usually from two to six notes are sounded this way, but up to ten or eleven can be played. This technique was especially important among nineteenth-century virtuosi, particularly Paganini.
- Louré (French; Italian portato) - This bow stroke, used in slow tempos, separates slurred notes slightly to articulate them, without stopping the bow. It is used in passages of a cantabile character.
- Arpeggio, arpeggiando, arpeggiato - A bouncing stroke, played on broken chords, so that each note of the arpeggio is played on a different string.
- Tremolo - Chiefly used for orchestral playing, this consists of moving the bow back and forth in very short strokes extremely rapidly, not in precisely measured rhythm (usually at upper half of the bow).
- Col legno - Occasionally the strings are struck with the stick of the bow ("with the wood.") This gives a muted percussive sound, and is most effective when employed by a full orchestral violin section. The eerie quality of a violin section playing col legno is exploited in some symphonic pieces, notably "Mars, the Bringer of War" of The Planets Suite by Holst as well as Frederic Chopin's Warsaw-era Piano Concerto No. 2, which predates it.
- Shuffle - A repetitive pattern of slurs and accents, much used in some fiddling styles. Named shuffles include the Nashville shuffle, the Georgia shuffle, and the double shuffle, which is often considered to be a trick or show-off shuffle.
- Chopping - A more modern percussive technique, in which the hair near the frog of the bow is struck against the strings with a quick scratching sound of indeterminate pitch. It is used predominantly by bluegrass musicians to replicate the off-beat chop of the mandolin however more recently the technique has been embellished by musicians such as Casey Driessen, Darol Anger, and Rushad Eggleston creating cyclical chops and triple chops. Chopping features as a mainstay of many bands arrangements such as Crooked Still, Teho and Turtle Island String Quartet.

=== Straight bow ===
No matter which attack or bow stroke is used, most professional violinists use a straight bow stroke, keeping the bow perpendicular to the string and parallel to the bridge. This ensures that the bow will stay in the desired sounding point and will create a consistent sound quality. One technique to achieving a straight bow is as follows. When taking a downbow, focus on the upper arm, the lower arm, and the hand/wrist. First, move the upper arm backwards as if elbowing someone in the nose. Next, follow through with the lower arm. Near the end of the bow stroke, rotate the wrist and hand as if opening a jar of peanuts. When used correctly, these motions will create a straight downbow bow stroke. A crucial step is to watch the bow and make sure it remains straight. An upbow is created in the opposite way. Still keeping an eye on the bow, move the lower arm in the direction that it came. Follow through with the upper arm. Near the end of this stroke, rotate the hand and wrist as if closing a jar of peanuts.

There is, however, another school of bowing, popularized by violin pedagogue Ivan Galamian, in which the bow is kept at a slight angle to the bridge. When the player draws a down bow, they are to move the right hand gradually away from their body; when they draw an up bow, towards the body. According to proponents of this style, these slight angles help create greater contact with the bridge and thus produce a fuller sound.

=== Pizzicato ===
When a note is marked pizz. (abbreviation for pizzicato) in the written music, it is played by plucking the string with a finger of the right hand rather than by bowing. When the bow hand is occupied (or for virtuosic effect) the left hand can be used; this is indicated by a "+" (plus sign) in the music. This allows players to simultaneously play bowed notes while plucking on a different string. In addition, some players have acquired the trick of playing fast pizzicato passages using two alternating fingers of the right hand. Players continue playing pizzicato until there is an indication to return to arco (playing with the bow).

There are two common positions for playing pizzicato. One is to clench the bow in the right hand, rest the right thumb on the right side of the finger board, then pluck the string. This position can enhance the tonal quality of the pluck and can reduce fatigue during long durations of plucking. Another pizzicato position is to maintain the bow grip, then pluck the strings with the right index finger. This position is especially helpful when the composer alternates between series of arco and pizzicato notes, because it allows the violinist to quickly and accurately switch styles.

Violinists may also pluck a string with their left hand, denoted on written music as a "+" symbol above the note desired. Left-handed pizzicato is generally less flexible pitch-wise than the right-handed technique, but allows the right hand to either stay where it is or simultaneously play, a technique composer and violinist Niccolo Paganini was renowned for.

A snap pizzicato, first specified by Gustav Mahler, but often called a Bartók pizzicato since Béla Bartók was the first to use the technique extensively, requires the player to pull the string away from the fingerboard so that when it is released it rebounds with force onto the fingerboard, yielding a sharp, percussive snapping sound. Examples can be found in Bartók's 44 Duos (No. 42, Arabian Song) and Solo Sonata for violin. .

== Mute ==
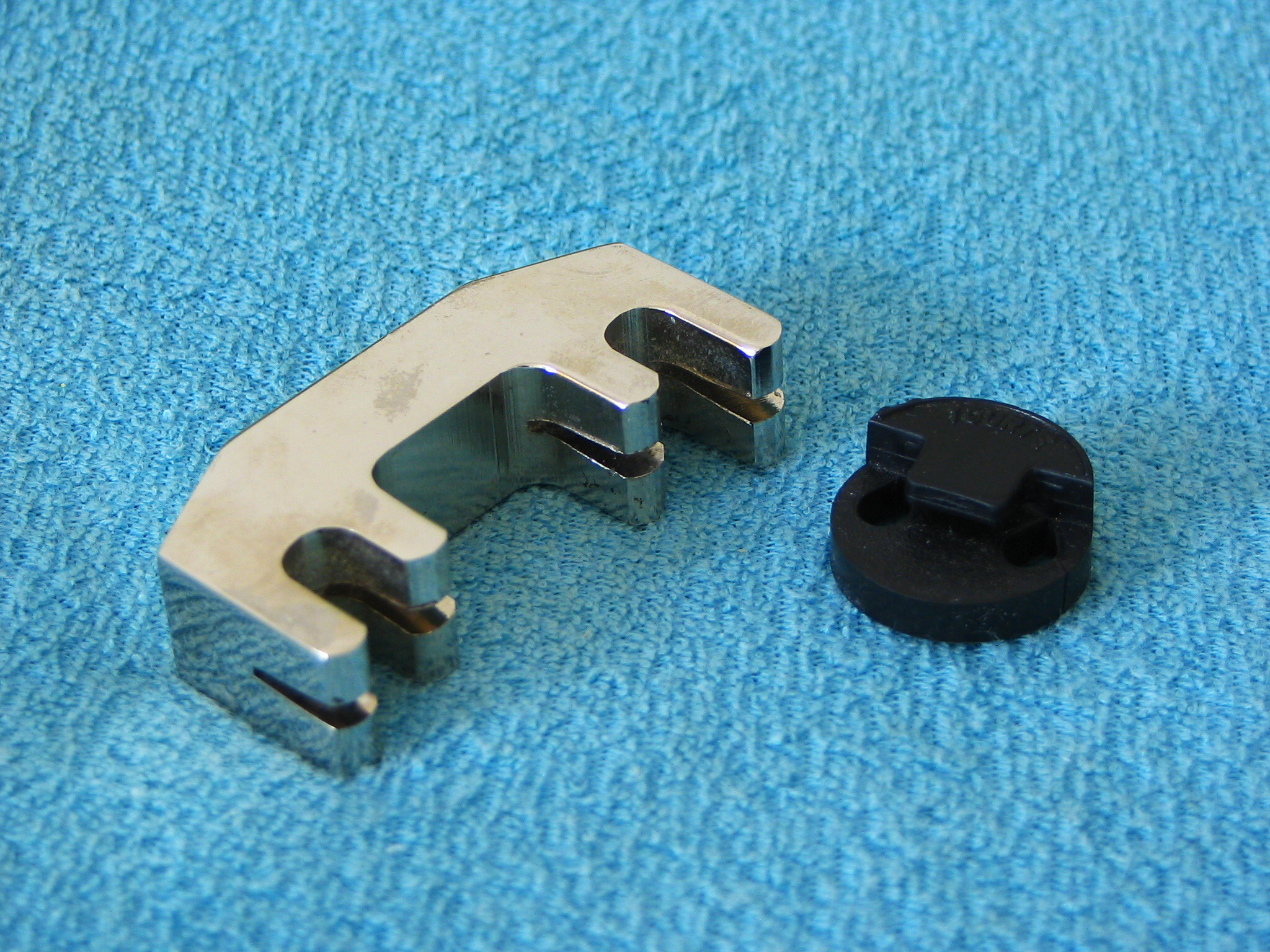
Two different forms of violin mutes

Attaching a small rubber, wooden, or metal device called a "mute" to the bridge of the violin alters the tone, softening the instrument's sound by adding mass to the bridge and therefore reducing its ability to vibrate freely, decreasing volume and giving a more mellow tone, with fewer audible overtones. In performances, it may give a desired dulled effect. Mutes are mostly used in orchestras with the entire string section playing with mutes, resulting in a soft, hushed sound quality. Parts to be played muted are marked con sord., for the Italian sordino or occasionally mit Dämpfer in German. (The instruction to take off the mute is senza sord., sometimes marked just senza or "ohne Dämpfer" in German.) In French, instruction is given for application of mutes at the beginning of muted passages, "mettez les sourdines", and for removal at the end "ôtez les sourdines".

Sharing the same name but with a completely different purpose, massive metal, rubber, or wooden "practice mutes" or "hotel mutes" are available. These mutes are used to drastically reduce the volume when practicing where others can be disturbed.

== Tuning ==
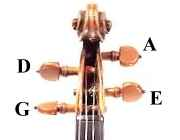
Scroll and pegbox, correctly strung

Violins are tuned by turning the pegs in the pegbox under the scroll, or by turning the fine tuner screws at the tailpiece. A violin always has pegs, but fine tuners (also called fine adjusters) are optional to have only one. Fine tuners permit the string pitch to be adjusted in very small amounts much more easily than by using the pegs. Most fine tuners work by turning a small metal screw, which moves a lever that is attached to the end of the string. (Another type of tuner, using a screw to crimp a short segment of the string's afterlength near the tailpiece, is sometimes found, most generally on smaller instruments.) Fine tuners are usually recommended for younger players, fractional-sized instruments, those using high-tension or metal strings, or beginners. Fine tuners are most useful with solid metal strings; since they do not stretch as much as synthetics, solid-core strings can be touchy to tune with pegs alone. Fine tuners are not useful when using gut strings; since these strings are more "stretchy", the tuners lack enough range of travel to make a significant pitch difference, and the sharp corners on the prongs may cause the string to break where the string passes over them. Most players use a fine tuner on the E-string even if the other strings are not so equipped.

The A string is tuned first to a reference pitch source such as a tuning fork or, in most orchestras, the oboe, typically to 440 Hz, although some orchestras tune to another standard A such as 442, or even as high as 445 or 446 Hz to produce a brighter sound. Early music groups interested in authentic performance may use a lower standard A. When playing with a fixed-pitch instrument such as a piano or accordion, the violinist must tune to accommodate that instrument. The other strings are then tuned to the A in intervals of perfect fifths by bowing them in pairs. This puts the open strings in just intonation, which means the lower strings may sound flat compared to their nominal equal-tempered equivalents. In practice, this means some compromises must be made, and the strings are not always tuned in perfect fifths, particularly on the viola and cello, where the lowest string is the C, three-fifths away from the reference A, making the difference more apparent.

Small, temporary tuning adjustments can also be made by stretching a string with the hand. A string may be flattened by pulling it above the fingerboard or sharpened by pressing the part of the string in the pegbox. These techniques may be useful in performance, reducing the ill effects of an out-of-tune string until the arrival of a rest or other opportunity to tune properly.

Tuning the violin, especially with the pegs, can cause the bridge to lean, usually toward the fingerboard. If left that way, it will warp. After tuning, experienced players typically check that the bridge is standing straight and centered between the inner nicks of the f holes, since bridges are free to move about, being held in place only by friction and the tension of the strings. Capable violinists know how to straighten and center a bridge; this can easily be done under normal string tension without damage to the instrument.

The tuning G-D-A-E is used for the great majority of all violin music. However, any number of other tunings are occasionally employed (for example, tuning the G string up to A), both in classical music, where the technique is known as scordatura, and in some folk styles where it is called "cross-tuning." Numerous such tunings exist, often being named for a prominent tune played in that tuning. A good example of scordatura in classical solo violin repertoire is Paganini's First Violin Concerto in E-flat major, where the violin part is written in D-major and the violinist is supposed to tune a half tone higher to match the orchestra's key of E-flat major. Another notable example is the Danse Macabre, which requires the E string to be tuned down a semitone.

== See also ==
- Bowed string instrument extended technique
- Pitch (music)
