= Lloyd Blackman (musician) =

Canadian violinist, conductor, composer

Lloyd Edgar Blackman (5 January 1928 – 16 September 2014) was a Canadian violinist, conductor, composer, and music educator.

== Life and career ==
Born in Winnipeg, Manitoba, Blackman studied violin with John Waterhouse and George Bornoff and music theory with W.H. Anderson. He earned a Licentiate from The Royal Conservatory of Music in 1944 at the age of 16. He later studied violin privately in New York City with Theodor Pashkus and with Ottokar Čadek at the University of Michigan from 1948 to 1949 and 1959–1960. He also studied conducting with Allard de Ridder.

Blackman began his performance career playing in several different orchestras for the Canadian Broadcasting Corporation when he was just 15 years old. He quickly began performing in a variety of other ensembles, including travelling shows and ballet orchestras. In 1947 he was appointed principal violinist of the CBC Winnipeg Orchestra, a post he held for two years. He served in the same position for the Winnipeg Symphony Orchestra in 1948–1949, during which time he was also an instrumental instructor in Winnipeg schools. From 1955–1975 he was concert master and associate conductor of the Regina Symphony Orchestra. He also worked as a conductor for CBC Radio concerts out of Regina.

In 1950 Blackman was appointed music director at Regina Central Collegiate Institute, later becoming supervisor of music for the Regina high schools in 1961. In 1954–1955 he conducted the Saskatchewan Golden Jubilee Chorus and in 1959 his musical, Prairie Pastel (for which his wife Elisabeth Blackman wrote the libretto), was presented for the Regina school's 50th anniversary. In 1962 he founded the Regina Inter-Collegiate Choir and Orchestra, ensembles with which he notably led performances at Expo 67 and on tours to Vancouver, Calgary, London (1972), and Minneapolis and St. Paul (1974). From 1963 to 1980 he was coordinator of fine arts for the Regina Board of Education. He also taught courses in music education at the University of Regina and the University of Saskatchewan and worked periodically in the summers as the orchestra conductor for the Saskatchewan Summer School of the Arts.

In 1980 Blackman relocated to British Columbia to assume the post of conductor and music director of the Nanaimo Symphony Orchestra, an ensemble with which he has appeared several times as a soloist. In 1985 he became director of the Delta Youth Orchestra, a post he held through 1990.

On 16 September 2014, he died in Vancouver, British Columbia, at the age of 86.
