= Ken Bochen =

Profile
- Positions: Guard, Tackle

Personal information
- Born: November 26, 1938; Winnipeg, Manitoba
- Died: November 18, 1999 (aged 60); St. Albert, Alberta
- Listed height: 6 ft 1 in (1.85 m)
- Listed weight: 222 lb (101 kg)

Career history
- 1959–1960: Winnipeg Blue Bombers
- 1961: Edmonton Eskimos

Awards and highlights
- Grey Cup champion (1959)

Kenneth Stanley Bochen (November 26, 1938 – November 18, 1999) was a Canadian professional football player who played for the Winnipeg Blue Bombers. He won the Grey Cup with them in 1959. After his football career, he worked for Molson Breweries. He died in 1999.
