= The Choristers =

Canadian chamber choir

The Choristers was a Canadian chamber choir based in Winnipeg that gave weekly nationally broadcast programs on CBC Radio from 1942 through 1969. According to The Canadian Encyclopedia, the choir achieved "a national reputation for their fine choral blend and sense of style". The group was sometimes referred to as the "Sunday Chorale", after the name of the weekly CBC Radio program on which the choir was featured from 1952 to 1969. Notable members of the chorus included Evelyne Anderson, Devina Bailey, Lorne Betts, Kathleen Morrison Brown, Reginald Hugo, May Lawson, Joan Maxwell, Phyllis Cooke Thomson, and Gladys Whitehead.

== History ==
Founded under the name the Oriana Singers in 1936 by composer and conductor W.H. Anderson, The Choristers initially consisted of 14 singers and specialized in performing madrigals, motets, folksong arrangements, and sacred and secular partsongs. Pianist Gordon Kushner notably served as the group's first accompanist.

In 1942, the choir changed its name to The Choristers and expanded to 20 singers. This expansion was done in order to meet the new recording needs of the group as they began giving weekly national broadcasts for the Canadian Broadcasting Corporation on 2 June 1942. The group occasionally performed with orchestras for their CBC broadcasts, often working with conductors Geoffrey Waddington and Eric Wild for these performances. In 1952, the group's weekly broadcast was retitled Sunday Chorale at which time the repertoire of the program changed to one consisting entirely of sacred choral music. Many of the works were accompanied, first by organist H. Hugh Bancroft, and later by organists Herbert Sadler and Filmer Hubble.

In 1955, Anderson stepped down as The Choristers director just a few months prior to his death. Hubble, who had been his pupil as well as serving as the choir's organist, took over as the choir's director. He led the group until his death in 1969 when Herbert Belyea, another Anderson pupil and a tenor in the choir, assumed the role of director. Belyea conducted the choir until it was dis-established in 1974. After Anderson's death, the group ceased to perform weekly broadcasts but did appear intermittently on CBC Radio during the 1970s.
