= Jeffrey Anderson (radio producer) =

Canadian music critic (1928–2014)

- Born: Jeffrey William Anderson; 26 April 1928; Winnipeg, Manitoba
- Died: 18 March 2014 (aged 85)
- Occupations: Canadian music critic, journalist, and television and radio producer

Jeffrey William Anderson (26 April 1928 – 18 March 2014) was a Canadian music critic, journalist, and television and radio producer.

== Background ==
Born in Winnipeg, Anderson was the son of English-born composer W. H. Anderson and the brother of soprano and actress Evelyne Anderson. He earned a Bachelor of Arts in 1951 from the University of Winnipeg and a Master of Philosophy in history from the University of London in 1960. Although not a musician by profession, he studied both the organ and piano with H. Hugh Bancroft and is recognized as an authority on British composers.

== Career ==
From 1951 to 1953, Anderson was an employee of Boosey & Hawkes in the London office of their promotions department. In 1959–1960 and 1966–1968 he worked as a music critic for the Winnipeg Free Press. In 1960, he became a music producer in both radio and television for the Canadian Broadcasting Corporation. For CBC Television he produced the 1963 broadcast of Gustav Holst's Savitri and the TV series Recital. From 1968 to 1972, he served as the CBC's program representative in England. He then returned to Canada to become supervisor of radio program evaluation for CBC Radio in Toronto in 1973. He left that post to work as the CBC's national supervisor of radio arts from 1975 to 1977. He then worked as an executive music producer for CBC Radio from 1977 to 1982. From 1983 to 1990, he was a faculty member of the Graduate School of Journalism at the University of Western Ontario. After 1990, he worked as a freelance journalist in Winnipeg. He died aged 85 on 18 March 2014.
