= Jack Bruzell =

Canadian football player

Profile
- Positions: Centre, Defensive end

Personal information
- Born: c. 1938 (age 87–88); Winnipeg, Manitoba, Canada
- Listed height: 6 ft 3 in (1.91 m)
- Listed weight: 230 lb (104 kg)

Career history
- 1959–1964: Winnipeg Blue Bombers

Awards and highlights
- 3× Grey Cup champion (1959, 1961, 1962)

Jack Bruzell (born c. 1938) was a Canadian professional football player who played for the Winnipeg Blue Bombers. He won the Grey Cup with them in 1959, 1961 and 1962.
