= Jim Ludlow =

Canadian business executive

James (Jim) Ludlow
- Born: Winnipeg, Manitoba, Canada
- Education: University of Manitoba (BA); Osgoode Hall Law School; York University (LL.B)
- Occupation: President
- Years active: 2001 - present
- Employer: True North Sports & Entertainment

James (Jim) Ludlow is a Canadian business executive. He is currently the president for True North Sports & Entertainment's Real Estate Development division. Prior to 2014, he was the president and CEO of True North, which owns Canada Life Centre and the Winnipeg Jets of the National Hockey League.

Ludlow earned a Bachelor of Arts from the University of Manitoba, and a law degree from York University's Osgoode Hall Law School.
