= Damian Marshall =

- Birth name: Damian Maas
- Origin: Winnipeg, Manitoba
- Genres: Country
- Occupation(s): singer, songwriter
- Years active: 1996–present
- Labels: Chinook, Civilian, Busy
- Website: www.damianmarshall.ca

Damian Marshall is a Canadian country music singer/songwriter from Winnipeg, Manitoba. Marshall has released three albums. After an injury while truck driving in 2009, he began working on a fourth album in Nashville, Tennessee.

== Discography ==
=== Albums ===
Year	Album
2000	Call It a Day Tonight
2003	Don't Say Anything at All
2006	Built to Last

=== Singles ===
Year	Single	Peak positions	Album
Year	Single	CAN Country	Album
2000	"Still Stirrin' Ashes"	—	Call It a Day Tonight
2000	"Lookout Below"	—	Call It a Day Tonight
2001	"Fortunate One"	×	Call It a Day Tonight
2003	"Don't Say Anything at All"	×	Don't Say Anything at All
2005	"Where I'm Running From"	22	Built to Last
2005	"That's What Love Is"	16	Built to Last
2006	"Why Don't We"	21	Built to Last
2006	"Built to Last"	20	Built to Last
2007	"Not Even a Little"	27	Built to Last
2007	"I Know What Love Is"	—	Built to Last
2008	"Inside Out"	—	Built to Last
2009	"Come Sundown"	—	Non-album singles
2009	"Every Time You Cross My Heart"	—	Non-album singles
2011	"Everything"	—	Non-album singles
"—" denotes releases that did not chart "×" indicates that no relevant chart existed or was archived

== Awards and nominations ==
Year	Association	Category	Result
2006	Canadian Country Music Association	Chevy Trucks Rising Star Award	Nominated
2009	Canadian Country Music Association	Rising Star	Nominated
