= Filmer Hubble =

Canadian musician (1904–1969)

Filmer Edwin Hubble (12 January 1904 – 25 November 1969) was a Canadian organist, choir conductor, adjudicator, and music educator of English birth.

== Life and career ==
Born in Dulwich, he immigrated to Canada in 1921 at the age of 17. He settled in Winnipeg where he studied music with Hugh Ross and served as assistant organist at Holy Trinity Anglican Church during the 1920s. He served as organist/choirmaster as many Winnipeg churches during the rest of his life, including St Stephen's Broadway United where he worked from 1943 until his death 26 years later. Under his leadership the St Stephen's choir was twice awarded the prestigious City of Lincoln Trophy.

Outside of his church work, Hubble conducted the Winnipeg Philharmonic Choir during World War II. He also conducted the Manitoba Schools' Orchestra (1941–1953), the Kelvin Grads Choir, the United College Chapel Choir, the University Glee Club, and the Winnipeg Ladies' Choir during his career. He also served as music director for numerous productions at Rainbow Stage and was organist for Sunday Chorale, a popular CBC Radio program featuring The Choristers. In 1955 he succeeded W. H. Anderson as The Choristers conductor, a position he held until his death.

As a teacher, Hubble taught on the faculty of the University of Manitoba in 1950-1951 and in 1956-1957. The UM later awarded him an honorary Legum Doctor in 1967. From 1958-1964 he taught at the Banff School of Fine Arts. He also taught privately and was a highly active adjudicator throughout western provinces of Canada. A kindly and giving teacher, he often waved lesson fees for needy students and was viewed by many of his students as a father-figure. One of his notable students was Lorne Betts. He died in Winnipeg in 1969 at the age of 65.
