= W. H. Anderson =

English composer and singer (1882–1955)

- Born: William Henry Anderson; 21 April 1882; London, England
- Died: 12 April 1955 (aged 72) Winnipeg, Manitoba, Canada
- Genres: Vocal music, carols
- Occupations: Composer; choir director; tenor; voice teacher
- Years active: 1903–1955

William Henry Anderson (21 April 1882 – 12 April 1955) was a composer, choir director, tenor, and voice teacher of English birth. He produced a large amount of vocal music, including more than 150 songs and 40 anthems as well as a significant amount of carols and other choral works. He also produced a large number of choral arrangements of Ukrainian, Czech, and Icelandic folksongs; mainly written for Winnipeg choir director Walter Bohonos and his choirs. He used the pseudonyms Hugh Garland and Michael Bilencko for some of his published ballads and folksong arrangements, however, most of his works were published under the name W.H. Anderson. 1982 Some of his more well known compositions include the anthem Come, I Pray Thee; the songs Hospitality and To Immortality; the trio for female voices Sea Blue Gardens; and the Christmas pieces Ane Song for the Birth of Christ, Lullaby of the Little Angels and The World's Desire.

== Life and career ==
Born in London, Anderson studied singing privately in his native city with Mattia Battistini and Manuel García and at the Guildhall School of Music and Drama. He served as a lay tenor at several notable churches in London, including St Paul's Cathedral, St Stephen Walbrook, and St. Paul's Church, Knightsbridge. In his early career he performed roles with the Moody-Manners Opera Company, sometimes using the name Wallace Anderson when performing. However, he mainly sang using his own name William. On 5 May 1903 he notably portrayed Monsieur Loustot in the London premiere of André Messager's Véronique with the composer conducting.

Anderson's abandoned his singing career after suffering from chronic bouts with bronchitis. He was advised by his doctor to leave London for a drier climate, and accordingly left England for Canada in 1910 where he ultimately settled in Winnipeg. He became a celebrated singing teacher in that city; notably teaching such musicians as Herbert Belyea, Lorne Betts, Lloyd Blackman, Ronald Dodds, James Duncan, Reginald Hugo, Wallace Lewis, Morley Meredith, Maxine Miller, Gladys Whitehead, and Phyllis Worth. He was also a much admired choir director in Winnipeg, notably founding and directing both CNR Choral Society and The Choristers. He conducted the latter choir from 1936 to 1955; notably leading the ensemble in an annual series of national broadcasts for CBC Radio from 1942 to 1955. The group continued to perform for nearly 20 years after Anderson's death. He also held several church posts in Winnipeg, including serving as music director of St Andrew's River Heights United from 1934 to 1954.

Anderson died in Winnipeg in 1955 at the age of 72. His son Jeffrey Anderson was a successful radio producer and music critic, and his daughter Evelyne Anderson was a successful actress and soprano.
