= Marie-Louise Valade =

Marie-Louise Valade (December 26, 1808 – May 13, 1861) was a Canadian Catholic nun. She founded the Sisters of Charity at the Red River Mission and served as superior.

The daughter of François Valade, a cattle farmer, and Marie-Charlotte Cadotte, she was born in Sainte-Anne-des-Plaines, Lower Canada. She entered the Hôpital Général of Montreal in 1826 and took her vows two years later. Valade was named an administrator for the hospital in 1838 and was elected depositary (financial manager) in 1843. Later that year, she was assigned the task of establishing a convent at the Red River Colony. She arrived at Saint-Boniface in June the following year. Valade returned to Montreal in 1849 to recruit more nuns. In 1851, a school in Saint-François-Xavier was opened. In the same year, the council of bishops of Quebec decided that groups of nuns in each diocese would form their own separate community. Because the nuns in the west were not able to recruit new members from the area, Valade lobbied successfully for the re-union of the Red River community with the Montreal community. New schools were established in St. Norbert and St. Vital. The nuns also set up an orphanage and provided nursing services.

She died in St. Boniface of cancer at the age of 52.
