= John Farlinger =

Canadian football player

Profile
- Position: Defensive back

Personal information
- Born: March 4, 1948 (age 78); Canada
- Listed height: 6 ft 0 in (1.83 m)
- Listed weight: 180 lb (82 kg)

Career history
- 1973–1978: Edmonton Eskimos

Awards and highlights
- 2× Grey Cup champion (1975, 1978)

John Farlinger (born March 4, 1948) is a Canadian former professional football player who played for the Edmonton Eskimos. He won the Grey Cup with Edmonton in 1975. He played college football at the University of Calgary.
