= Simon Blaszczak =

Canadian football player (born 1983)

No. 71
- Position: Slotback

Personal information
- Born: August 20, 1983 (age 43); Winnipeg, Manitoba, Canada
- Listed height: 6 ft 5 in (1.96 m)
- Listed weight: 225 lb (102 kg)

Career information
- University: Manitoba
- CFL draft: 2009: undrafted

Career history
- 2005: Winnipeg Blue Bombers*
- * Offseason or practice squad member only
- Stats at CFL.ca (archive)

Simon Blaszczak (born August 20, 1983) is a Canadian former football wide receiver. He went undrafted in the 2009 CFL draft. He played CIS football for the Manitoba Bisons.

Blaszczak was also a member of the Winnipeg Blue Bombers but was cut following training camp and returned to college.
