= James Bond (Canadian football) =

Canadian football player

No. 60
- Positions: Tackle, Defensive end

Personal information
- Born: April 24, 1949 (age 77); Winnipeg, Manitoba, Canada
- Listed height: 6 ft 3 in (1.91 m)
- Listed weight: 245 lb (111 kg)

Career information
- University: Simon Fraser

Career history
- 1971–1975: Calgary Stampeders

Awards and highlights
- Grey Cup champion (1971)

James (Jim) Bond (born April 24, 1949) was a Canadian professional football player who played for the Calgary Stampeders. He won the Grey Cup with them in 1971. He played college football at Simon Fraser University. After his playing career, Bond worked as a real estate agent based in North Vancouver, British Columbia.
