= Plett =

Plett is a surname of German origin that is common among Russian Mennonites and their descendants. Notable people with the surname include:

- Barbara Plett Usher, journalist
- Casey Plett, Canadian writer
- Danny Plett, musician
- Delbert Plett, Canadian lawyer and historian
- Don Plett, Canadian senator
- Peter Plett, German scientist
- Willi Plett, Paraguayan-Canadian hockey player
