= Queen City Kids =

Canadian hard rock band

- Origin: Regina, Saskatchewan, Canada, Winnipeg, Manitoba, Canada (reformed)
- Genres: Rock, hard rock
- Years active: 1968–1983, 1990
- Label: Columbia
- Past members: Alex Chuaqui; Kevin Fyhn; John L. Donnelly; Jeff Germain

Queen City Kids (QCK) was a Canadian hard rock band from Regina, Saskatchewan, and later based in Winnipeg, Manitoba, who scored a number of Canadian hits in the early 1980s including "Girls", "Dance", and "Black Box." The band was active from 1968 to 1983 and consisted of vocalist Alex Chuaqui, guitarist Kevin Fyhn, bass player John L. Donnelly, and drummer Jeff Germain.

Queen City Kids formed in Regina in 1969 under the name Cambridge, while members were still in high school. After 11 years together, the band relocated to Winnipeg and released their first self-titled album in 1981. The album reached the number one spot in Regina and Winnipeg and was later certified gold.

Queen City Kids then toured with April Wine, Ozzy Osbourne, Streetheart, Joan Jett, and Blue Öyster Cult.

Their second album, Black Box, was released in 1982 by CBS records (Columbia records at the time) and spawned a Canadian hit with "Dance." The same year, the band caused a stir in the small conservative Mennonite town of Steinbach, Manitoba, after a scheduled rock concert at the local high school was cancelled by the school board a day before the show. The cancellation of the concert was protested by hundreds of students, made national news, and was alluded to years later in the work of novelist Miriam Toews.

The album failed to chart in the United States and the band was dropped by the label. The band broke up in 1983, but continues to play reunion shows. In October 2007, QCK was inducted into the Western Canada Music Hall of Fame. In 2015, the band released a live album recorded in 1981 called 1981 Live.

== Members ==
- Alex Chuaqui (vocals, guitars, keys)
- Kevin Fyhn (guitars, vocals)
- John L. Donnelly (bass, vocals)
- Jeff Germain (drums)

== Discography ==
=== Singles ===
- "Down Again"/"Kids World" (1981, Columbia)
- "Dance"/"Black Box" (1982, Columbia)
- "Girls" (1982, Columbia)

=== Albums ===
- Queen City Kids (1981, Columbia)
- Black Box (1982, Columbia) (#27 Canada)
- 1981 Live (2015, self-released)
