= MaryLou Driedger =

Canadian Young Adult fiction author

- Born: 1953 (age 72–73)
- Occupation: Young Adult fiction author
- Writing career
- Period: 2020s–present
- Notable works: Lost on the Prairie, Sixties Girl

MaryLou Driedger (born 1953) is a Canadian journalist and Young Adult fiction novelist from Winnipeg, Manitoba.

== Career ==
Driedger has been a columnist for The Carillon since in the 1980s and was also a longtime columnist for the Winnipeg Free Press.

Her debut Young Adult fiction novel, Lost on the Prairie, was published by Heritage House Publishing in 2021. It was a finalist for the Eileen McTavish Sykes Award for Best First Book at the Manitoba Book Awards. Her second novel, Sixties Girl appeared in 2023.

== Personal ==
Driedger was born in a Mennonite family in Winnipeg and grew up in Steinbach, Manitoba. She is a retired teacher, who taught in Steinbach and Hong Kong and former Manitoba Teacher of the Year. Driedger also leads tours at the Winnipeg Art Gallery.
