= Steinbach Pride =

Annual pride march in Steinbach, Manitoba, Canada

Steinbach Pride (also known as the March for Equality) is an annual pride march and rally in Steinbach, Manitoba. The first event, which was attended by 3,000 people, was held on July 9, 2016. It garnered national attention in Canada after no elected officials of the area chose to attend.

== History ==
In spring 2013, the NDP provincial government tabled Bill 18, an anti-bullying bill, which required all publicly funded schools to support anti-bullying student groups, including those supporting students of "all sexual orientations and gender identities," such as Gay-Straight Alliances (GSAs).

Some socially conservative groups such as Southland Community Church and Steinbach Christian School opposed the bill on grounds that it violated their religious freedom, and Steinbach City Council passed a resolution asking the government to review the issue. A prayer meeting in Steinbach against Bill 18 drew 1,200 people. Bill 18 passed without amendments in September, and has not been rescinded even after the Progressive Conservatives came into power.

In 2016, Steinbach resident Michelle McHale petitioned Hanover School Division, asking for an inclusive curriculum, while the board responded by citing an internal policy not to discuss same-sex relationships in the classroom. It also denied a similar request from a lesbian student in one of their schools. McHale and her partner then filed a Human Rights Complaint against Hanover School Division.

McHale, who had been involved in Pride Winnipeg, organized the first ever Pride Parade in Steinbach.

Since 2019, the event has been organized by Chris Plett. The 2020 and 2021 events were postponed due the Covid 19 pandemic, with the event returning in August 2022.

In 2025, Pride in Steinbach had to be cancelled due to threats of violence posted online and a lack of security budget from the local pride organization. Organizers said they received serious threats against a performer that could have put attendees' safety at risk. In October of 2025, they hosted a Queer Country Fair, but with limited tickets and no promotional advertising to ensure safety. Local conservative politicians were also not told about the fair to prevent the word of the event from spreading; instead, supportive politicians from the city of Winnipeg, such as Logan Oxenham and Uzoma Asagwara, were invited.

=== First parade ===
The first Steinbach Pride event was held on July 9, 2016. Organizers were expecting about 200 people, but over 3,000 people came from the region and across the province and the parade received national attention.

Support for the parade grew when news and criticisms broke that neither the mayor of Steinbach, their provincial representative, Kelvin Goertzen, nor their federal representative would attend. Federal MP Ted Falk claimed a conflict in his schedule with Frog Follies festival in St-Pierre-Jolys, but when the Follies organizers publicly asked him to attend Steinbach Pride instead, Falk came out to say he would not attend because of “values of faith, family and community.”

At first, the RCMP denied the organizers' application for a permit to march on the street and asked the parade to stay on the sidewalk, but were able to negotiate a route with the city. The parade route went from E.A. Friesen Park to Steinbach City Hall, where speakers addressed a crowd that spilled out beyond the building's lawn.
