= Lynette Loeppky =

Canadian writer

Lynette Loeppky is a Canadian writer, who published the memoir Cease in 2015. The book, a memoir of her experience when her partner Cecile Kaysoe was diagnosed with terminal cancer at a time when Loeppky was dissatisfied with and considering leaving the relationship, was a shortlisted nominee for the Lambda Literary Award for Lesbian Memoir/Biography at the 27th Lambda Literary Awards, the Writers' Guild of Alberta's Wilfrid Eggleston Award for Nonfiction, and the Hilary Weston Writers' Trust Prize for Nonfiction.

Loeppky was born into a Mennonite family in Steinbach, Manitoba and grew up in Carman, Manitoba. She studied Russian literature at the University of Calgary, and later worked in corporate sales while residing with Kaysoe on a hobby farm in the rural outskirts of Calgary, Alberta. Following Kaysoe's death, Loeppky moved back to Calgary.
