= Eastman Raiders =

- Founded: 1991
- League: MMFA
- Based in: Steinbach, Manitoba, Canada
- Stadium: AD Penner Park
- Colours: Teal, Black, Silver
- President: Tim Malyk
- Championships: 2009 Midget Provincial Champions; 2024 MMFA U16 Bantam Championship
- Website: www.eastmanraiders.com

The Eastman Raiders Football Club are a Canadian Youth Football Club located in Steinbach, Manitoba. The team participates in leagues organized by the Manitoba Minor Football Association of which the club is a member. The Eastman Raiders Football Club was formed in 1991 by Paul Beauchamp, operates at four different ages levels, and play home games at A.D. Penner Park, with facilities including bleachers, canteens, team clubhouses and an electronic scoreboard. The most notable Raiders alumni is Canadian Football League star Andrew Harris.

The 2024 U16 Bantam MMFA (Manitoba Minor Football Association) season concluded with the Eastman Raiders emerging as the champions. The team achieved a perfect 10–0 record, showcasing their dominance throughout the season. In the championship game, held at Princess Auto Stadium in Winnipeg on October 27, 2024, they defeated the Falcons Football Club with a high-scoring victory of 94-70 under the leadership of head coach Steve Baxter.
