= Paul Dyck =

Canadian ice hockey player (born 1971)

- Born: April 15, 1971 (age 55) Steinbach, Manitoba, Canada
- Height: 6 ft 1 in (185 cm)
- Weight: 200 lb (91 kg; 14 st 4 lb)
- Position: Defence
- Shot: Right
- Played for: Muskegon/Cleveland Lumberjacks; Kansas City Blades; Detroit Vipers; Houston Aeros; Iserlohn Roosters; Krefeld Pinguine; Schwenninger Wild Wings
- NHL draft: 236th overall, 1991; Pittsburgh Penguins
- Playing career: 1991–2006

Paul Dyck (born April 15, 1971) is a Canadian former professional ice hockey defenceman and currently the head coach and general manager of the Manitoba Junior Hockey League's Steinbach Pistons.

== Playing career ==
Dyck played major junior hockey with the Moose Jaw Warriors of the Western Hockey League and was drafted 236th overall by the Pittsburgh Penguins in the 1991 NHL entry draft. He spent ten seasons in the International Hockey League, mostly with the Cleveland Lumberjacks and Houston Aeros, and was a member of the Aeros' 1999 Turner Cup championship team. Dyck moved to Germany in 2001 and played four seasons in the Deutsche Eishockey Liga with the Iserlohn Roosters and Krefeld Pinguine, and was a member of Krefeld's championship team in 2002-03. Dyck played one season with the Schwenninger Wild Wings of the 2nd Bundesliga and then retired from professional hockey in 2006.

== Coaching career ==
Dyck resides in his hometown of Steinbach, Manitoba and has worked for the Manitoba Junior Hockey League's Steinbach Pistons since 2010: as head coach since December 2011 and the dual role of general manager and head coach since July 2012. Dyck has led the Pistons to three league championships (2013, 2018, 2023) and one ANAVET Cup in 2018. He had been selected to coach at the Canadian Junior Hockey League Prospects Game (2015) and World Junior A Challenge (2015, 2020). Dyck was named winner of the Muzz McPherson Award as MJHL Coach of the Year in 2016-17 and ranks in the league's top ten list for total wins as a head coach.

== Career statistics ==
			Regular season					Playoffs
Season	Team	League	GP	G	A	Pts	PIM	GP	G	A	Pts	PIM
1989–90	Moose Jaw Warriors	WHL	72	5	10	15	86	—	—	—	—	—
1990–91	Moose Jaw Warriors	WHL	72	12	41	53	63	8	0	7	7	17
1991–92	Muskegon Lumberjacks	IHL	73	6	21	27	40	14	1	3	4	4
1992–93	Cleveland Lumberjacks	IHL	69	6	21	27	69	1	0	0	0	0
1993–94	Cleveland Lumberjacks	IHL	60	1	10	11	57	—	—	—	—	—
1994–95	Cleveland Lumberjacks	IHL	79	5	12	17	59	4	1	3	4	4
1995–96	Kansas City Blades	IHL	51	2	5	7	76	—	—	—	—	—
1995–96	Detroit Vipers	IHL	5	1	1	2	8	7	0	0	0	12
1996–97	Kansas City Blades	IHL	49	2	8	10	39	—	—	—	—	—
1996–97	Houston Aeros	IHL	30	1	4	5	32	13	0	1	1	12
1997–98	Houston Aeros	IHL	81	6	13	19	82	4	0	0	0	10
1998–99	Houston Aeros	IHL	76	4	18	22	62	19	2	3	5	18
1999–00	Houston Aeros	IHL	76	2	7	9	58	11	0	0	0	12
2000–01	Houston Aeros	IHL	65	4	5	9	34	6	0	0	0	2
2001–02	Iserlohn Roosters	DEL	56	3	11	14	48	—	—	—	—	—
2002–03	Krefeld Pinguine	DEL	45	3	5	8	24	14	0	2	2	12
2003–04	Krefeld Pinguine	DEL	26	2	3	5	20	—	—	—	—	—
2004–05	Krefeld Pinguine	DEL	52	2	7	9	36	—	—	—	—	—
2005–06	SERC Wild Wings	Germany2	48	6	17	23	77	11	1	2	3	12
DEL totals			179	10	26	36	128	14	0	2	2	12

== Awards ==
- 1998-99, Turner Cup Champion
- 2002-03, DEL Champion
- 2012-13, MJHL Champion (as coach)
- 2016-17, MJHL Coach of the Year
- 2017-18, MJHL Champion (as coach)
- 2017-18, ANAVET Cup Champion (as coach)
- 2017-18, MJHL Coach of the Year
- 2022-23, MJHL Champion (as coach)
