= Loewen Windows =

Canadian millwork manufacturer

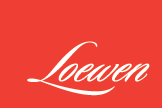
- Company type: Private
- Industry: Window & Door
- Founded: 1905; 121 years ago
- Founder: Cornelius Toews Loewen
- Headquarters: Steinbach, Manitoba, Canada
- Area served: United States, Canada, Mexico, Caribbean
- Number of employees: 700 (2025)
- Website: www.loewen.com

Loewen is a Canadian manufacturer of wood window and door systems for residential and light commercial applications. The company uses Douglas fir and mahogany in its products. As of 2025, it had a network of several hundred dealers across North America and employed approximately 700 people.

== History ==
Loewen was founded in 1905 by Cornelius Toews Loewen in Steinbach, Manitoba, as Loewen Millwork. Early products included church pews and beekeeping equipment. From the 1930s through the 1940s the company shifted to manufacturing pre-built windows and doors to supply the post-war boom in housing construction.

In the 1990s, Loewen expanded into the United States and became a supplier of custom wood windows and doors. Following the 2008 financial crisis, Loewen Windows lost 90% of its business and was forced to cut the employees from 1,700 down to 500. In 2010, the business was sold from the local Loewen family to VKR Holding A/S, an investment company based in Denmark. A few years later, the company was purchased back from VKR Holding A/S by brothers Clyde and Charles Loewen in 2013, with support from other investors. The window manufacturer continued to sustain itself despite additional economic troubles during the COVID-19 pandemic and the tariffs enacted by Donald Trump on Canada in 2025. As of 2025, Loewen Windows exports approximately 85% of its products to the United States, making it vulnerable to economic conditions there.
