= Lee Bartel =

Canadian music educator

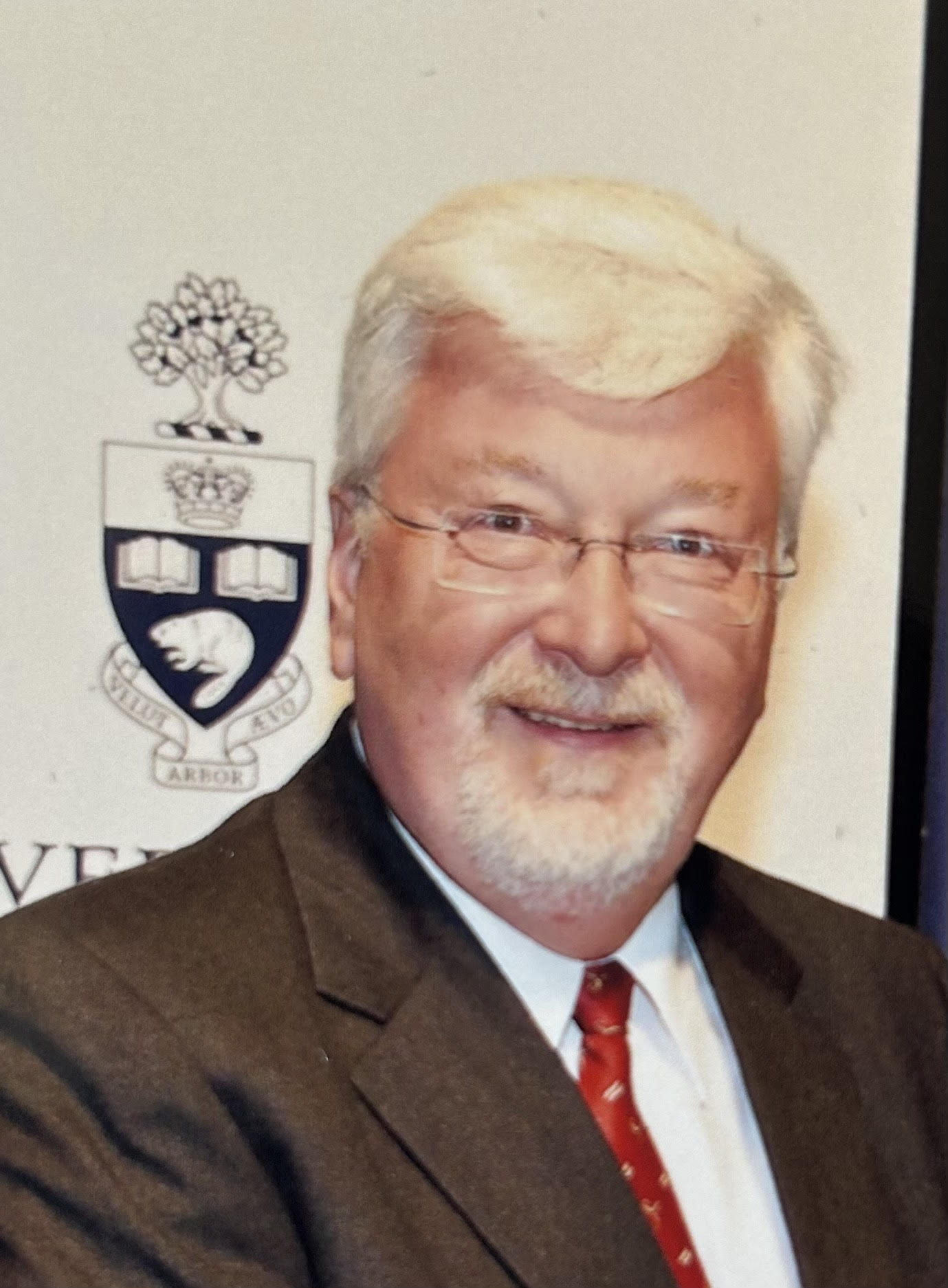
- Born: 1948 (age 77–78); Steinbach, Manitoba
- Citizenship: Canadian
- Education: University of Manitoba, Teachers' Certification 1969; University of Manitoba, BA 1973; Brandon University, (B.Mus, 1975) University of Manitoba, M.Ed 1984; University of Illinois at Urbana Champaign, Ph.D
- Known for: Clinical research on vibroacoustic stimulation as neuromodulation including first human study of 40hz gamma stimulation for Alzheimer's
- Scientific career
- Fields: Music cognition, Music Education, Music medicine, Neuroscience
- Workplaces: Brandon University; University of Manitoba, Steinbach Bible College; Providence University College; University of Toronto; University of South Florida
- Thesis: A Study of the Cognitive-Affective Response to Music

Lee R. Bartel is a Canadian music educator, researcher, and professor emeritus at the University of Toronto. He is known for his work in general education, music education, social psychology, and interdisciplinary work at the intersection of music, health, and neuroscience.

His career spans contributions to music performance, public education, church music, and academic leadership. He is the Founding Director of both the Music and Health Research Collaboratory (MaHRC) and the Canadian Music Education Research Centre at the University of Toronto. He also served as Associate Dean of Research at the university's Faculty of Music.

== Early life and education ==
He was born in 1948 in Steinbach, Manitoba. Bartel completed his Ph.D. in education and music at the University of Illinois at Urbana-Champaign (University of Illinois UC) in 1988, a Master of Education (1984) and a Bachelor of Arts in history (1973) at the University of Manitoba, and a Bachelor of Music (1975) from Brandon University. In parallel with his academic studies, Bartel pursued conservatory-based training in music performance earning the Associate in Music (A.Mus., 1981) and the Licentiate in Music (L.Mus., 1983) in vocal performance from the Western Board of Music. Having begun as a guitarist and violinist, he focused his advanced study on vocal training with renowned instructors Bernard Diamant at University of Toronto, Clifton Ware at University of Minnesota, and William Warfield at University of Illinois UC.

== Career ==
Bartel began his career as a middle school science teacher and music educator in 1969 and for the next decade contributed to the Manitoba public school system as a teacher, consultant, and teacher educator with appointments in the St. Boniface, St. Vital, and Morris-MacDonald school districts and concurrently held sessional appointments at Brandon University and the University of Manitoba.

His primary contribution was the development of guitar programs including creating a widely used program published by Yamaha called Get into Guitar, consulting on the Provincial curriculum guide for guitar in Junior and Senior High schools, running implementation workshops for teachers, and culminating in his Master thesis evaluating guitar programs. Between 1975 and 1985, he served as Chair of the Music Department at Steinbach Bible College, where he played a role in the development of a four-year music degree, the design of a new music department building, and the institutional accreditation processes. Concurrently he held sessional appointment at Providence University College and Theological Seminary focusing on church music. He also served as founding president of the Steinbach Arts Council.

In 1987, Bartel joined the University of Toronto as assistant professor of Music Education in the Faculty of Music. He was promoted to associate professor in 1993 and Full Professor in 2009.

He also held long-term appointments as a Continuing Member of the School of Graduate Studies from 1994, and served in cross-appointed roles with the Ontario Institute for Studies in Education (OISE), the Rehabilitation Sciences Institute, and the Institute for Life Course and Aging.

His teaching and supervisory activities spanned a range of subjects, including music education, social psychology of music, music and the brain, and research methodology.

Bartel served as Founding Director of the Canadian Music Education Research Centre and later as Founding Director of the Music and Health Research Collaboratory (MaHRC) at the University of Toronto. From 2003 to 2004, he was a Visiting Research Scholar and Professor at the University of South Florida.

His leadership extended to institutional accreditation and curriculum review, including service with the Canadian Association for Music Therapy and conducting an on-site review of a proposed Bachelor of Health Science and Music program at McMaster University in 2019.

Since his retirement from full-time academic duties in 2017, Bartel has remained actively engaged in research and advisory roles.

He has been on the Board of the Room 217 Foundation promoting the use of music in long-term-care contexts, is currently affiliated with the Music and Health Research Institute at the University of Ottawa, an advisory board member of the Ozmo Institute for Neuroaesthetics at the University of Tennessee Health Science Center, and sits on the International Advisory Board of VIBRAC – The Skille-Lehikoinen Centre for Vibroacoustic Therapy and Research at the University of Jyväskylä, Finland. Since 2019, he has served as Chair of the Scientific Advisory Board for Neuro Spinal Innovation, Inc.

== Research and scholarly work ==
Bartel's research has pursued multiple topical threads including church music, general education, music education, cognitive neuroscience, social psychology, research methodologies, and therapeutic sound applications. In church music he examined cultural practices including music of the Amish.

In general education, he focused on teacher and student self-efficacy, on conditions of learning to foster engagement, and most notably the issue of student homework.

Together with colleague Linda Cameron, a child psychology and play expert at the University of Toronto, Bartel co-developed over 60 educational music albums for Fisher-Price, designed to support early childhood development through music.

He and Cameron conducted controversial research on music teaching exposing emotional and physical abuse at all levels of instruction and resultant stress and anxiety among professional musicians.

In the later phase of his career, Bartel expanded his focus to include the therapeutic use of music and sound in clinical and rehabilitative contexts.

He became widely known for his work on sound as pulsed stimulation, particularly for its potential in neurology, hemodynamics, and musculoskeletal conditions. His interdisciplinary research has addressed applications of sound as a neuromodulatory stimulant for managing chronic pain such as fibromyalgia and neurodegenerative disease including Alzheimer's.

He has developed 24 albums aimed at supporting relaxation, sleep, and cognitive focus through scientifically calibrated acoustic frequencies. These works were produced under labels such as Solitudes and SonicAid, and are distinct from his educational recordings. His brain-based audio work has earned critical acclaim and commercial success, including multiple Juno Award nominations. Gold and Platinum Album certifications in Canada, and additional recognition in the United States.

== Selected publications ==
=== Books ===
- Williamon, A.; Edwards, D.; Bartel, L. (2011-08-24). "Proceedings of the International Symposium on Performance Science 2011". performancescience.org.
- Bartel, L, ed. (2004). Questioning the music education paradigm. Research to practice. Toronto: Canadian Music Educators' Association. ISBN 978-0-920630-90-7.

=== Book chapters ===
- Bartel, L; Clements-Cortes, A (January 2014). "Dying healthy: The place of music therapy in palliative care". In Andrews, G. J. (ed.). Medicinal melodies. pp. 145–157.
- Bartel, L; Radocy, Rudolf E (2004-04-18), "Trends in Data Acquisition and Knowledge Development", in Colwell, Richard; Richardson, Carol (eds.), The New Handbook Of Research On Music Teaching And Learning: A Project of the Music Educators National Conference, Oxford University Press, p. 0, doi:10.1093/oso/9780195138849.003.0069, ISBN 978-0-19-513884-9

=== Articles ===
- Bartel, L; Mosabbir, A (2021-05-18). "Possible Mechanisms for the Effects of Sound Vibration on Human Health". Healthcare. 9 (5): 597. doi:10.3390/healthcare9050597. ISSN 2227-9032. PMC 8157227. PMID 34069792.
- Bartel, L; Dyback, P; Khan, A (2024-08-17). "The Treatment of Chronic Complex Regional Pain Syndrome with Novel Neuromodulatory Sound Waves: A Case Report". Healthcare. 12 (16): 1640. doi:10.3390/healthcare12161640. ISSN 2227-9032. PMC 11353587. PMID 39201198.
- Black, S; Bartel, L; Rodin, G (2020-09-10). "Exit Music: The Experience of Music Therapy within Medical Assistance in Dying". Healthcare. 8 (3): 331. doi:10.3390/healthcare8030331. ISSN 2227-9032. PMC 7551927. PMID 32927626.
- Mackinnon, C; Fedorowycz, A; Bartel, L; Cara, J; Pearson, S; Foster, B (2022-07-19). "Using Music Care Initiatives to Target Isolation and Loneliness in Long-Term Care". Canadian Journal of Recreation Therapy. 1 (1). ISSN 2832-4382.
- Clements-Cortes, A; Ahonen, H; Evans, M; Freedman, M; Bartel, L (2016-05-10). "Short-Term Effects of Rhythmic Sensory Stimulation in Alzheimer's Disease: An Exploratory Pilot Study". Journal of Otolaryngology-Head & Neck. 52 (2): 651–60. doi:10.3233/JAD-160081. hdl:1807/72411. PMID 27031491.
- Bartel, Lee; Thompson, Edward (2022). "Coping With Performance Stress: A Study of Professional Orchestral Musicians in Canada". Visions of Research in Music Education. 16 (5).
- Bartel, L (1992). "The development of the Cognitive-Affective Response Test—Music". Psychomusicology: A Journal of Research in Music Cognition. 11 (1): 15–26. doi:10.1037/h0094135. ISSN 2162-1535.
- Bartel, L; Greenberg, S; Friesen, L; Ostroff, J; Bodmer, D; Shipp, D; Chen, J.M (2011). "Qualitative case studies of five cochlear implant recipients' experience with music". Cochlear Implants International. 12 (1): 27–33. doi:10.1179/146701010x486435. ISSN 1467-0100. PMID 21756456.
- Bartel, L; Chen, R; Alain, C; Ross, B (2017-07-28). "Vibroacoustic Stimulation and Brain Oscillation: From Basic Research to Clinical Application". Music and Medicine. 9 (3): 153. doi:10.47513/mmd.v9i3.542. ISSN 1943-863X.
- Cheetu, S; Medeiros, M; Winemaker, L; Li, M; Bartel, L; Foster, B; Mackinnon, C (2022-02-28). "Understanding the Effects of Music Care on the Lived Experience of Isolation and Loneliness in Long-Term Care: A Qualitative Study". Healthcare. 10 (3): 457. doi:10.3390/healthcare10030457. ISSN 2227-9032. PMC 8956006. PMID 35326935.
- Abu Omar, A.J; Al Baradie, M. S; Al Dera, H; Vannabouathong, C; Bartel, L (2022). "Management of pain due to cervical multilevel disk bulges and spinal stenosis with a focused vibro-percussion wave treatment: A case report". Clinical Case Reports. 10 (4) e05344. doi:10.1002/ccr3.5344. ISSN 2050-0904. PMC 8978778. PMID 35387283.
- Smith, L; Bartel, L; Joglekar, S; Chen, J (2017). "Musical Rehabilitation in Adult Cochlear Implant Recipients With a Self-administered Software". Otology & Neurotology. 38 (8): e262–e267. doi:10.1097/mao.0000000000001447. ISSN 1531-7129. PMID 28806336.
