= Lynnette D'anna =

Canadian writer (born 1955)

Lynnette D'anna (born 1955 as Lynnette Dueck) is a Canadian writer, and the author of five novels. Canadian literature

== Biography ==
D'anna was born in Steinbach, Manitoba, and currently resides in Winnipeg. She was a finalist for the John Hirsch Most Promising Manitoba Writer Award in 1992 following the publication of her first novel, sing me no more, published by Press Gang Publishers under her birth-name, Dueck. Her second novel, RagTimeBone, a coming-of-age story for young adults published by New Star Books, is also available in German, translated and published as Zeit der Blöße by Argument Verlag (Hamburg) in 2000.

Her first three books—sing me no more, RagTimeBone and fool's bells—form a thematic trilogy. Her fourth, Belly Fruit, is an erotic murder-mystery published by New Star Books in 2000. Her final novel, vixen, published in 2001 by Pedlar Press, an imprint of Insomniac Press, challenges sexual norms, and examines the themes of memory and thought censorship.

D'anna is a graduate of creative communications with a journalism major. She was a regular contributor to Zygote magazine, a feature columnist at Interchange, and has contributed to a large number of literary journals and newspapers during the course of her career. As managing editor of the Canadian Women's Health Network Magazine, she facilitated the production of two special issues on Diversity and Women's Health.

She is past-president of Prairie Fire Press board of directors, mentor to emerging writers both privately and in the Manitoba Writers Guild Mentor Program, and awards jurist for the Manitoba Arts Council. Over the course of her writing career, her work has been recognized with awards from the Canada Council for the Arts, the B.C. Arts Council and the Manitoba Arts Council.

D'anna is considered an important figure in Queer Mennonite literature and has been described by Daniel Shank Cruz as "the godmother of queer Mennonite literature."

== Bibliography ==
- sing me no more, Press Gang Publishers, 1992
- RagTimeBone, New Star Books, 1994
- fool's bells, Insomniac Press, 1999
- Belly Fruit, New Star Books, 2000
- Zeit der Blöße, Argument Verlag, Hamburg 2000
- vixen, Insomniac Press, 2001

== Awards ==
- Manitoba Community Newspapers Association Student Journalism Award, 1991–1992
- Winnipeg Press Club Student Journalism Award, 1991–1992
- Finalist, John Hirsch Most Promising Manitoba Writer Award, 1992
- Listed Who's Who of Canadian Women, 1997–1998.
