= Erich Vogt =

Canadian physicist

Erich Wolfgang Vogt
- Born: November 12, 1929; Steinbach, Manitoba, Canada
- Died: February 19, 2014 (aged 84); Vancouver, British Columbia, Canada
- Education: University of Manitoba; Princeton University
- Relatives: Roy Vogt (brother)
- Awards: Order of Canada; Order of British Columbia; Fellow of the Royal Society of Canada
- Scientific career
- Fields: Nuclear physics
- Workplaces: University of British Columbia

Erich Wolfgang Vogt, OC OBC FRSC (November 12, 1929 - February 19, 2014) was a Canadian physicist.

== Biography ==
Born into a pacifist Mennonite family in Steinbach, Manitoba, Vogt received a Bachelor of Science degree in 1951 and a Master of Science degree in 1952 from the University of Manitoba. He received a Ph.D. from Princeton University in 1955 under the direction of Eugene Wigner.

In 1965, he started teaching at the University of British Columbia. From 1975 to 1981, he was the Vice President (Faculty & Student Affairs). He retired in 1994, although he came back in 2000 to teach several 100 level physics courses. He is best known as one of the founders of TRIUMF, Canada's national laboratory of nuclear and particle physics, which utilizes a particle accelerator, located on the University of British Columbia. He was the director from 1981 to 1994. Vogt co-authored and edited 24 volumes of Advances of Nuclear Physics with John W. Neagle.

In 1976, he was made an Officer of the Order of Canada for his "role in the creation the new multi-million dollar cyclotron at the University of British Columbia, which is a major achievement in Physics in Canada". In 2006, he was awarded the Order of British Columbia. In 1970, he was made a Fellow of the Royal Society of Canada.

He has received honorary degrees from the University of Manitoba, Queen's University, University of Regina, Carleton University, Simon Fraser University, and University of British Columbia.

On December 4, 2009, he gave his final lecture at the UBC Hennings Building, room 201, to his class of Physics 107 students. This lecture was also attended by faculty members as well as former students. He continued to work at TRIUMF.

== Death ==
Vogt died on February 19, 2014 at Vancouver General Hospital.
