= Jon Barkman =

Canadian ice hockey player

- Born: October 2, 1979 (age 46) Steinbach, Manitoba, Canada
- Height: 5 ft 11 in (180 cm)
- Weight: 209 lb (95 kg; 14 st 13 lb)
- Position: Centre
- Shot: Right
- Played for: ECHL; Toledo Storm; WCHL; Idaho Steelheads; LNAH; Laval Chiefs; Europe; HC Gherdëina; TEV Miesbach; HC Eppan-Appiano
- NHL draft: Undrafted
- Playing career: 2000–2008

Jon Barkman (born October 2, 1979) is a Canadian former professional ice hockey player.

Prior to turning professional, Barkman played major junior ice hockey in the Western Hockey League with the Saskatoon Blades and Prince George Cougars.

== Awards and honours ==
Award	Year
Senator Joseph A. Sullivan Trophy - CIS Player of the year	2001–02
