= Roy Vogt =

Canadian economist, professor, literary critic and pastor

- Born: 1934; Steinbach, Manitoba, Canada
- Died: 1997
- Education: University of Manitoba
- Occupation: Economist
- Relatives: Erich Vogt (brother)
- Writing career
- Period: 1970s–1990s

Roy H. Vogt (1934–1997) was an economist, professor, literary critic and pastor from Steinbach, Manitoba and an important figure in Mennonite literature. Vogt was born in 1934 in Steinbach and pastored First Mennonite Church in Winnipeg where he died in 1997.

== Economics career ==
Vogt received a PhD. in 1970 and taught economics at the University of Manitoba for many years. He authored a number of textbooks on economics including Whose Property? The Deepening Conflict Between Private Property and Democracy in Canada and Economics: Understanding the Canadian Economy. In 1998, the University of Manitoba Faculty Association created an annual Roy Vogt Memorial Award named in his honour.

== Literary career ==
Vogt was also a significant contributor and literary critic of the first wave of Mennonite literature during the 1970s, founding the Mennonite Mirror and the Mennonite Literary Society in 1970, and was a contributor to the Journal of Mennonite Studies.
