= Danny Plett =

Canadian musician, songwriter and music producer of Contemporary Christian music

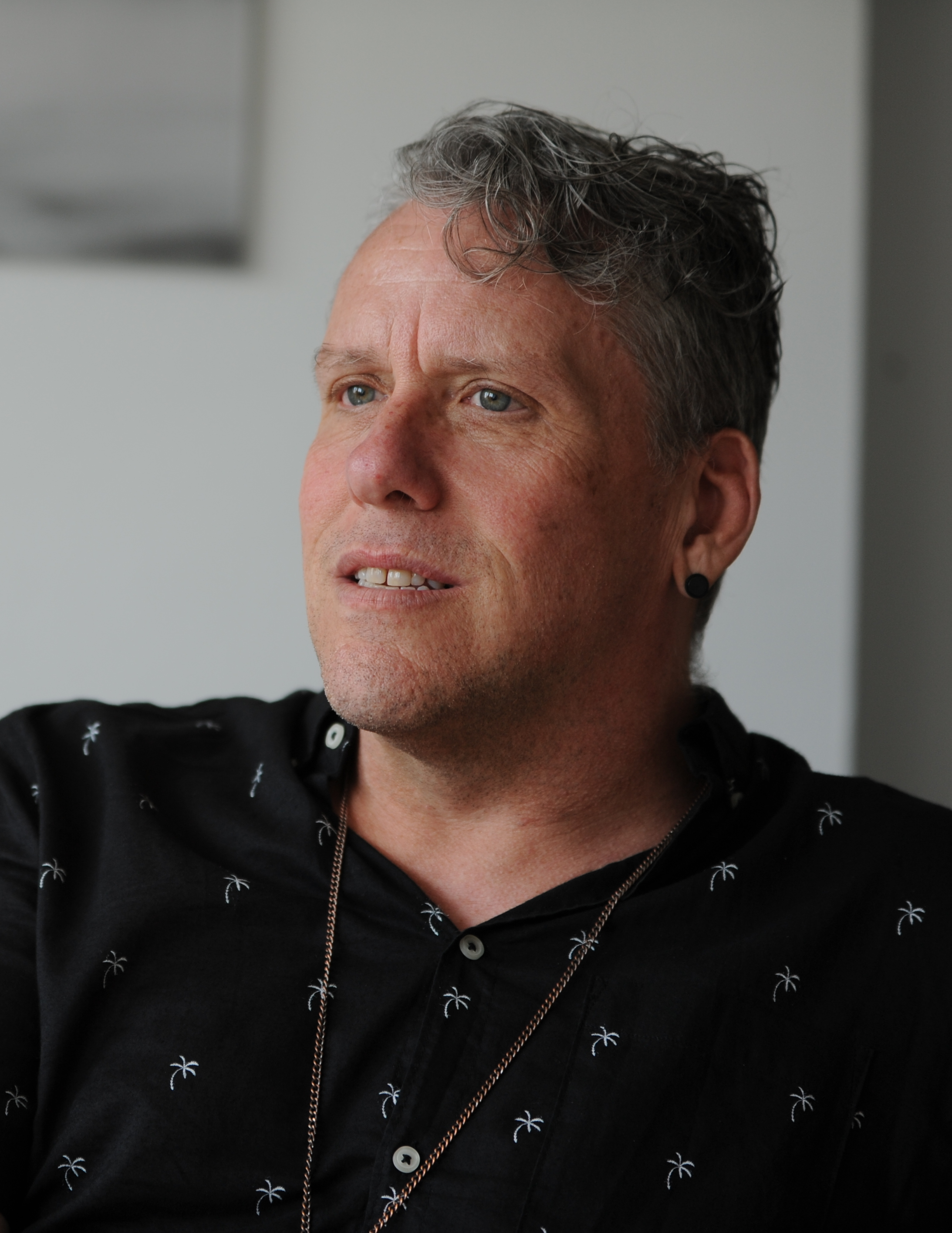
Danny Plett

Danny Plett (1963) is a Canadian musician, songwriter, and music producer of Contemporary Christian music, who has worked in Germany and Canada.

== Life and career ==
Danny Plett was born in Steinbach, Manitoba with three siblings in a musical family. He began writing his own songs at the age of twelve and, after years of performing, released his debut You're The One at the age of 21. Tours through Canada followed, including US and Europe with B. J. Thomas and Silverwind.

From 1992 to 2013 Danny Plett lived in Germany and worked in the Janz Team as a musician. In addition to his own solo productions, he led the youth program One Accord for many years and published concept albums for children in the series Bible Verses Singing Learning. With Brian Delamont and Heinrich Reisich he founded the band Danny Plett & Liberation (abbreviated to DP&L or DPL). In 2006 he performed at the ProChrist in Munich, which was broadcast throughout Europe. He wrote songs for German musicians, such as Cae Gauntt, Beate Ling, Anja Lehmann and Yasmina Hunzinger among others. His last CD was released by Gerth Medien with the title "Learn even more Bible verses by singing." He created this production with longtime colleague Hanjo Gäbler.

In 2013, Plett moved back to Canada with his family.

== Discography ==
Year	Title	Label	Remarks
1984	You're The One	New Born Records (Praise Industries Corp.); LP-Nr. NB7046	Debütalbum, Veröffentlichung in Kanada
1998	Where Angels Dance	Janz Team Music	
2004	Wie ein Strom	Janz Team Music	Englischsprachige Parallelausgabe erschienen unter dem Titel Like A River
2004	Wunder über Wunder	Janz Team Music	Weihnachtsalbum
2006	Komm zum Kreuz	Janz Team Music	Englischsprachige Parallelausgabe erschienen unter dem Titel Come to the Cross
2008	Dich will ich sehn	Janz Team Music	
2009	Thousand Days	Janz Team Music	
2011	Wenn du nicht wärst	Gerth Medien	Englischsprachige Parallelausgabe erschienen unter dem Titel If Not For You
2012	Licht dieser Welt	Gerth Medien	Weihnachtsalbum
2016	Tanz durch den Sturm	Gerth Medien	
