= Delbert Plett =

- Born: March 4, 1948
- Died: November 4, 2004 (aged 56)
- Occupation: Lawyer
- Known for: Writings on Russian Mennonite history

Delbert Plett (March 6, 1948 – November 4, 2004) was a Russian Mennonite lawyer, land developer and historian from Steinbach, Manitoba, most known for his writing on Russian Mennonite history, in particular the Kleine Gemeinde. Plett wrote fourteen books, including some historical fiction, and founded Preservings Magazine. When he died in 2004, funds from his estate were used to establish the D.F. Plett Historical Research Foundation.

== Works ==
- Plett, Delbert: Plett Picture Book, Steinbach, MB: D. F. Plett Farms Ltd., 1981.
- Plett, Delbert: History and Events, Steinbach, MB: D. F. Plett Farms Ltd., 1982.
- Plett, Delbert: The Golden Years: The Mennonite Kleine Gemeinde in Russia (1812-1849), Steinbach, MB: D. F. P. Publications, 1985.
- Plett, Delbert: Storm and Triumph: The Mennonite Kleine Gemeinde (1850-1875), Steinbach, MB: D. F. P. Publications, 1986.
- Plett, Delbert: Profile of the Mennonite Kleine Gemeinde 1874, Steinbach, MB: DFP Publications, 1987.
- Plett, Delbert: Pioneers and Pilgrims: The Mennonite Kleine Gemeinde in Manitoba, Nebraska and Kansas, 1874 to 1882, Steinbach, MB: D. F. P. Publications, 1990.
- Plett, Delbert: Leaders of the Mennonite Kleine Gemeinde in Russia, 1812 to 1874, Steinbach, MB: Crossway Publications, 1993.
- Plett, Delbert: Sarah's Prairie, Winnipeg: Windflower Communications, 1995.
- Plett, Delbert: Saints and Sinners: The Kleine Gemeinde in Imperial Russia 1812 to 1875, Steinbach, MB: Crossway Publications, 1999.
- Plett, Delbert: East Reserve 125: Hanover Steinbach 1874-1999, Steinbach, MB: Hanover Steinbach Historical Society in conjunction with the East Reserve 125 Steering Committee, 1999.
- Plett, Delbert: Dynasties of the Kleine Gemeinde in Imperial Russia and North America, Steinbach, MB: Crossway Publications, 2000.
- Plett, Delbert, ed.: Old Colony Mennonite in Canada 1875 to 2000, Steinbach, MB: Crossway Publications, 2001.
- Plett, Delbert and Reger, Adina: Diese Steine: Die Russlandmennoniten, Steinbach, MB: Crossway Publications, 2001.
- Plett, Delbert and Johann Plett: A Mennonite Family Saga, Steinbach, MB: Crossway Publications, 2003.
