= The Carillon (Steinbach) =

Canadian newspaper in Manitoba

- Front page of the April 16, 2020 edition
- Type: Weekly newspaper
- Owner: FP Canadian Newspapers Limited Partnership
- Founder(s): Eugene Derksen; Bruno Derksen
- Publisher: Derksen Printers
- Founded: February 21, 1946
- Headquarters: Steinbach, Manitoba
- City: Steinbach, Manitoba
- Country: Canada
- Website: www.thecarillon.com

The Carillon is a weekly newspaper based in Steinbach, Manitoba. It is published by Derksen Printers and focuses on local Southeastern Manitoba news.

== History ==
Prior to the establishment of the Carillon News, Steinbach was home to Arnold Dyck's German-language Steinbach Post. On February 21, 1946, the English-language Carillon News made its debut, under the guidance of Eugene Derksen as editor and Bruno Derksen as advertising manager. George Derksen and Peter Rosenfeld were the typesetters. Ernest Neufeld, a brother-in-law, also became a partner and worked as a typesetter and sports reporter while his wife Irene (Eugene's sister) was the office manager. Both George Derksen and Ernest Neufeld moved to Saskatchewan later and became weekly newspaper publishers, owning the Estevan Mercury and Weyburn Review respectively.

The Carillon went on to become the largest rural newspaper in the province, winning hundreds of awards both provincially and nationally.

In February 2011, the paper was purchased by the owner of the Winnipeg Free Press.

== See also ==
- List of newspapers in Canada
