= Hanover School Division =

School district in Manitoba, Canada

Location
- 5 Chrysler Gate, Steinbach, Manitoba Canada
- Coordinates: 49.491°N 96.748°W

District information
- Grades: N-12
- Established: 1877
- Chief Superintendent: Joe Thiessen
- School board: Board of Trustees
- Schools: 20
- Budget: $118 m CAD (2023/24)

Students and staff
- Students: 9,090 (2025)
- Staff: 1,100 (2025)

Other information
- Website: hsd.ca

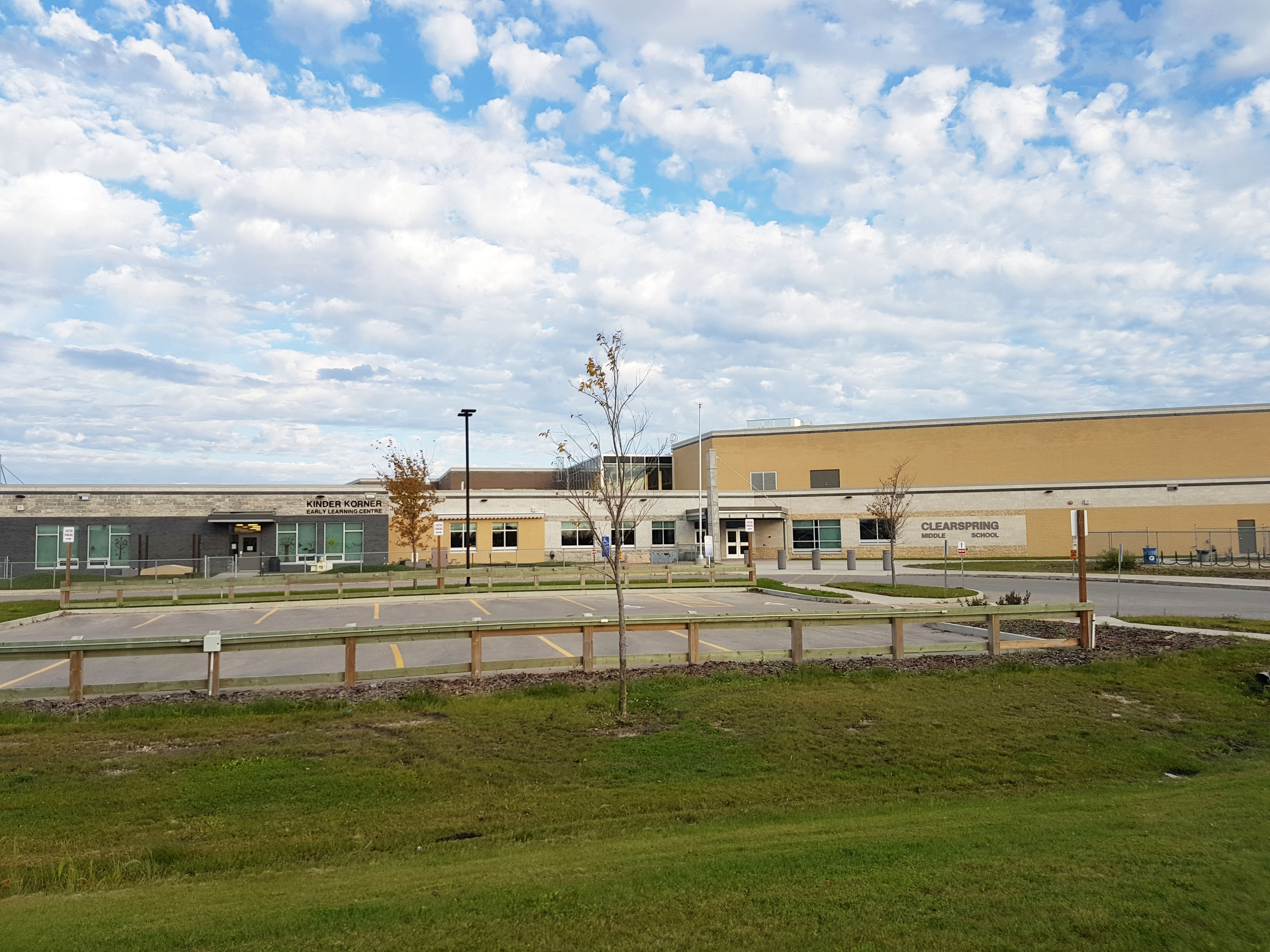
One of the new schools in Steinbach, Hanover's Clearspring Middle School completed in 2012.

Hanover School Division is a public administrative body located in southeastern Manitoba, Canada, responsible for the management of public schools in the Rural Municipality of Hanover, City of Steinbach, Town of Niverville, and the community of Landmark in the Rural Municipality of Taché. The division operates under the direction of a board of 10 elected trustees representing six wards. Its offices are located in Steinbach, the third largest city in Manitoba.

== History ==
The Hanover School Division was created by the provincial government as part of a major overhaul of Manitoba's public education system in the 1960s.

Two new schools were constructed in Steinbach and were completed in 2012 and 2013 respectively. One new middle school, Clearspring Middle School with a capacity for about 800 students that was built on the east side of Steinbach. A new high school was also built on the site of the Steinbach Regional Secondary School and adding it to the original building, effectively expanding the school's capacity. These two new schools were announced as part of the federal deficit spending in 2009 and as a response to the waves of new immigrants attending school. Many schools in the area are filled to capacity and are using temporary structures to house and educate students.

As of late 2016, the latest round of new schools include a new 400 seat 9-12 high school, a 650-seat k-4 elementary school (both for Niverville), a new school for New Bothwell, and a new 480 seat k-4 elementary school in Steinbach.

== Schools in the Hanover School Division ==
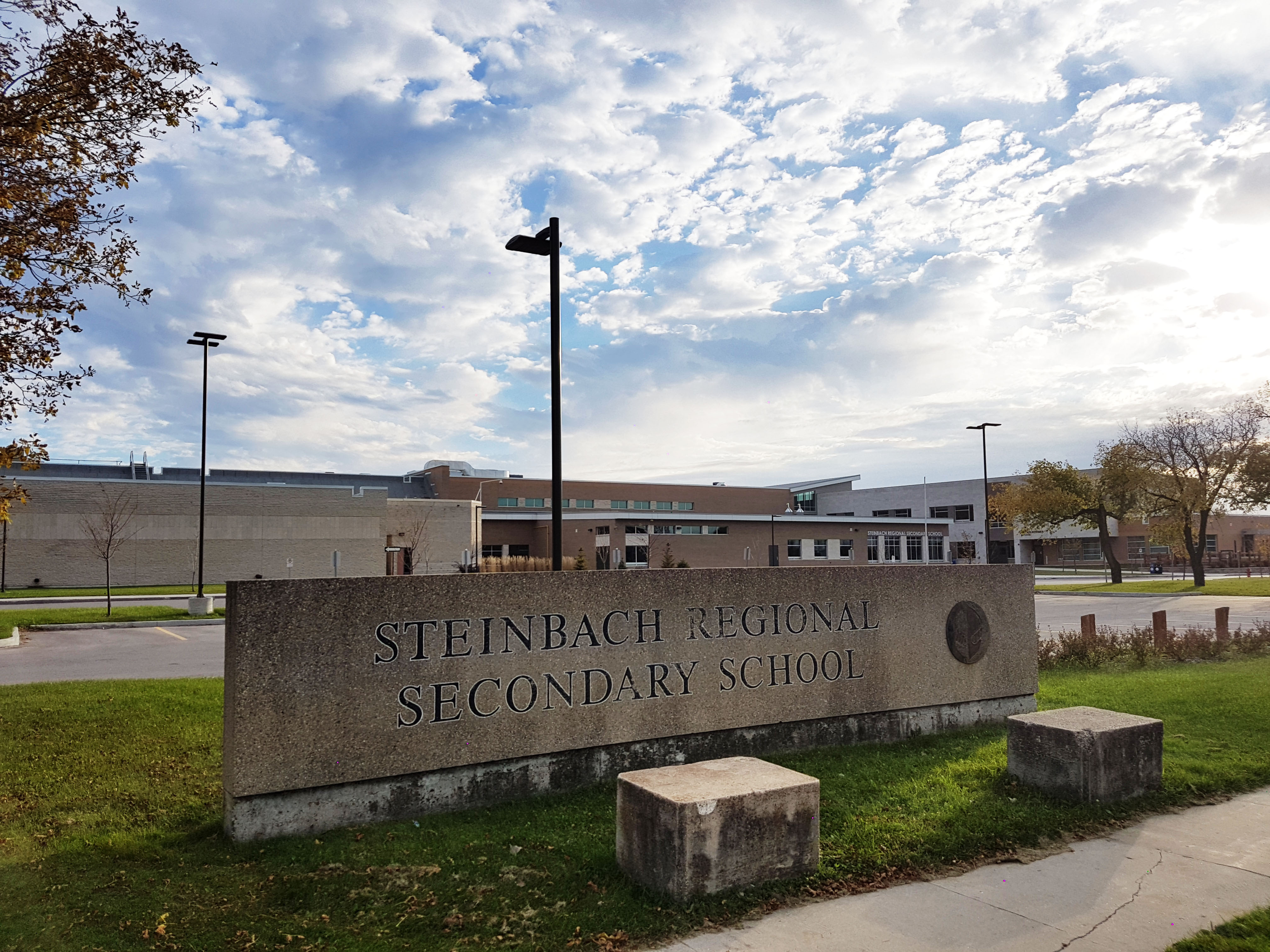
Steinbach Regional Secondary School in Steinbach, and Hanover's largest school.

School	Level	Location	Students
Blumenort School	Elementary (K-8)	Blumenort, Manitoba	400 (2022–23)
Bothwell School	Elementary (K-8)	New Bothwell, Manitoba	100 (2022–23)
Clearspring Middle School	Middle School (5–8)	Steinbach, Manitoba	618 (2022–23)
Crystal Spring	(K-12)	Ste. Agathe, Manitoba	39 (2009–10)
Elmdale Elementary School	Elementary (K-4)	Steinbach, Manitoba	515 (2022–23)
Green Valley School	High School (5–12)	Grunthal, Manitoba	470 (2022–23)
Kleefeld School	Elementary (K-8)	Kleefeld, Manitoba	395 (2022–23)
Landmark Collegiate	High School (7–12)	Landmark, Manitoba	220 (2022–23)
Landmark Elementary	Elementary (K-6)	Landmark, Manitoba	200 (2022–23)
Mitchell Elementary	Elementary (K-4)	Mitchell, Manitoba	425 (2022–23)
Mitchell Middle	Middle School (5–8)	Mitchell, Manitoba	279 (2022–23)
Niverville Elementary	Elementary (K-4)	Niverville, Manitoba	474 (2009–10) (2022–23)
Niverville High School	High School (9–12)	Niverville, Manitoba	350 (2022–23)
Niverville Middle School	Middle School (5–8)	Niverville, Manitoba	400 (2022–23)
Parkhill School	Elementary (K-4)	Steinbach, Manitoba	500 (capacity, new in 2025–26)
South Oaks School	Elementary (K-4)	Grunthal, Manitoba	270 (2022–23)
Southwood Elementary School	Elementary (K-4)	Steinbach, Manitoba	515 (2022–23)
Stonybrook Middle School	Middle School (5–8)	Steinbach, Manitoba	565 (2022–23)
Steinbach Regional Secondary School	High School (9–12)	Steinbach, Manitoba	1,900 (2022–23)
Woodlawn School	Elementary (K-4)	Steinbach, Manitoba	533 (2022–23)
Total enrollment (approximate)			9,090 (2025–26)

== See also ==
- List of school districts in Manitoba
