= Mennonite literature =

Mennonite literature emerged in the mid-to-late 20th century as both a literary movement and a distinct genre. Mennonite literature refers to literary works created by or about Mennonites.

== Definition ==
Mennonite literature, in the modern sense, usually refers to literary works by Mennonites about Mennonites, whether the author is Mennonite by ethnicity or religion. Although fiction was written about Mennonites by non-Mennonites since at least the 1800s, the term Mennonite literature, as a genre, usually refers to literary works written by people who self-identify as Mennonites. There is debate as to whether Mennonite literature constitutes a movement, genre, or an "accent". There is some debate as to whether literature written by Mennonites that is not expressly about Mennonites, such as the work of A. E. van Vogt and Paul Hiebert, should be classified as Mennonite literature.

Mennonite literature often deals with topics of identity and has been described as "transgressive" as it is often critical of Mennonite traditions. Magdalene Redekop posits a "Spielraum" or playspace of Mennonite writers and other artists. Some Mennonite writers have been characterized as overtly comedic such as Arnold Dyck, Armin Wiebe, and Andrew Unger, while others, such as Miriam Toews, have incorporated humour into otherwise more serious subject matter. The literature offers Mennonites a place to explore ideas and experiences that may not be accepted within sanctioned church publications. Maurice Mierau has described Mennonite literature as "making art out of one's own experience and history, even when that history is different from the official version of propaganda and pulpit." Robert Zacharias has pointed out that Canadian Mennonite literature has come to be primarily associated with Russian Mennonites.

Amish and Mennonite romance novels or "bonnet rippers" are generally not considered part of "Mennonite literature" as they are often not written by Mennonites, are considered of little literary value, and are usually classified as their own genre or sub-genre.

== History ==
=== Early history ===
Mennonite literature of some form has existed since the emergence of the Anabaptist movement in the 16th century, when many Mennonites would read the works of Menno Simons and owned a copy of Martyrs Mirror. Early works by non-Mennonites about Mennonites include the novels of Helen R. Martin, while Mabel Dunham's historical novel The Trail of the Conestoga and Gordon Friesen's critical Flamethrowers are examples of early 20th Mennonite writing from an insider's point-of-view. In 19th and early 20th century Europe, the most significant Mennonite literary voices were German-language poet Bernhard Harder and J.H. Janzen, a noted Mennonite short story writer. Other notable writers such as Hermann Sudermann had Mennonite backgrounds, though his work did not include any reference to this background. Early in the 20th century, Russian Mennonite writers Arnold Dyck and later Reuben Epp began to write fiction in Plautdietsch, which had been an unwritten language until then.

=== Peace Shall Destroy Many ===
In the modern sense, however, Mennonite literature as a significant literary movement really emerged in the later half of 20th century as assimilated Mennonites in North America began to write English-language works of fiction, rather than historical or theological treatises. At the time when Rudy Wiebe published the controversial Peace Shall Destroy Many in 1962, he was considered a lone voice of Mennonite writing in Canada.

=== 20th century ===
In the decades after the publication of Peace Shall Destroy Many, a wave of Mennonite literature emerged, particularly on the Canadian Prairies, with writers like Di Brandt, Lois Braun, Patrick Friesen, Dora Dueck, Sarah Klassen, Armin Wiebe, David Bergen, Sandra Birdsell, Audrey Poetker, Al Reimer, and Miriam Toews offering a critical eye to their Mennonite upbringing during the 1980s and 1990s. Winnipeg-based publisher Turnstone Press was at the forefront of championing and promoting Mennonite literature at this time. Roy Vogt's Mennonite Mirror was an important literary journal from the 1970s, while Victor Ens' Rhubarb Magazine was an important showcase of Mennonite writing from the late 1990s until its last issue in 2018.

In the late 20th century, there was a significant increase in Mennonite publications, and public awareness of Mennonite writers in Canada. Rudy Wiebe became the first Mennonite to win the Governor General's prize for The Temptations of Big Bear in 1973. He won the prize a second time for A Discovery of Strangers in 1994.

In the United States, authors such as Julia Kasdorf, Jeff Gundy, Warren Kliewer, and Merle Good have contributed to the movement. Good's novel Happy as the Grass Was Green was published in 1971 and was made into the film Hazel's People two years later. Ingrid Rimland's novel The Wanderers won the California Literary Award in 1977.

=== 21st century ===
In 2001, Sandra Birdsell's historical fiction novel The Russlander was shortlisted for the Governor General's Award and in 2004, Miriam Toews won the Governor General's award for her bestselling novel A Complicated Kindness. The next year, David Bergen won the Giller Prize for The Time in Between. Rhoda Janzen's 2009 memoir Mennonite in a Little Black Dress spent 13 weeks on the New York Times bestseller list. In 2016, Katherena Vermette, who is of Mennonite and Metis background, published the bestselling novel The Break. In 2021 Rachel Yoder's Nightbitch was a finalist for the PEN/Hemingway Award for Debut Fiction, among other awards. Sarah Polley's adaptation of Miriam Toews's novel Women Talking won the Academy Award for Best Adapted Screenplay in 2023.

In 1990 Katie Funk Wiebe observed that "satire as a comment on the human condition has not been used successfully in Mennonite periodicals, even if clearly labeled satire, indicating that the point of view expressed is likely to be the opposite of what is expressed." In 2016, Mennonite writer Andrew Unger started the Mennonite satire website The Daily Bonnet, now called The Unger Review, the success of which indicates a change in attitudes towards satire among Mennonites. Turnstone Press published Unger's satirical novel Once Removed in 2020 and a collection of The Daily Bonnet articles called The Best of the Bonnet in 2021.

Queer Mennonite literature has also emerged in recent years. Daniel Shank Cruz notes the work of Lynnette D'anna, Stephen Beachy, Jan Guenther Braun, and Casey Plett as important works of Queer Mennonite literature. Plett won the Amazon.ca First Novel Award and the Lambda Literary Award for Transgender Fiction for her novel Little Fish and was long-listed for the Giller Prize for her short story collection A Dream of a Woman.

While most works of Mennonite literature have been in the categories of literary fiction, poetry, and theatre, in recent years, Mennonite authors have explored genres such as fantasy and science fiction. Originating with A. E. van Vogt, more recent Mennonite sci-fi, fantasy and speculative fiction writers include Karl Schroeder, Sofia Samatar, Jessica Penner, and Robert Penner. Samatar published a memoir reflecting on her Swiss Mennonite and Somali Muslim background called The White Mosque in 2022. Rachel Yoder's 2021 novel Nightbitch is a notable example of magic realism by a Mennonite author.

According to historian Royden Loewen, the best-selling works of Mennonite literature include The Mennonite Treasury of Recipes, A Complicated Kindness by Miriam Toews, Mennonite Girls Can Cook and Martyrs Mirror.

Mennonite writers have won or been nominated for Governor General's Literary Awards seventeen times and the Giller Prize twelve times.

== Literary criticism ==
Organized by Conrad Grebel University College professor Hildi Froese Tiessen, the first Mennonite/s Writing academic conference was held in Waterloo, Ontario in 1990, while seven more conferences have been held since that time, establishing Mennonite literary criticism. Along with Peter Hinchcliffe, Froese Tiessen edited Acts of Concealment: Mennonite/s Writing in Canada in 1992.

The literary criticism of Ervin Beck and Ann Hostetler has been instrumental in codifying Mennonite literature. The English Department at Goshen College is home to the Center for Mennonite Writing and publishes the Center for Mennonite Writing Journal.

Significant works of Mennonite literary criticism include Rewriting the Break Event: Mennonites and Migration in Canadian Literature (2013) and Reading Mennonite Literature: A Study in Minor Transnationalism (2022) by Robert Zacharias of York University, Daniel Shenk Cruz's book on Queer Mennonite Literature called Queering Mennonite Literature: Archives, Activism, and the Search for Community (2019), University of Toronto scholar Magdalene Redekop's Making Believe: Questions About Mennonites and Art (2020) and Sabrina Reed's Lives Lived, Lives Imagined (2022), the first ever monograph on the work of Miriam Toews.
