= Jack Thiessen =

Canadian writer (1931–2022)

- Born: 14 April 1931; Grunthal, Manitoba, Canada
- Died: 9 October 2022 (aged 91); Steinbach, Manitoba, Canada
- Education: University of Winnipeg, University of Marburg
- Occupation: Lexicographer
- Spouse: Audrey Poetker (m. 1991)
- Writing career
- Period: 1970s–2020s
- Notable work: Mennonite Low German Dictionary

John Peter Thiessen (14 April 1931 – 9 October 2022) was a Canadian Russian Mennonite teacher, translator, and writer from Manitoba. Alongside Arnold Dyck and Reuben Epp, he was an important contributor to the development of Mennonite Low German literature, as well as one of the language's most prominent lexicographers.

== Early life and education ==
Thiessen was born in Gnadenfeld near Grunthal, Manitoba, Canada, on 14 April 1931. He grew up in Grunthal and attended high school at Mennonite Collegiate Institute in Gretna, Manitoba. Thiessen graduated from the University of Manitoba, and received his PhD at the University of Marburg.

== Career ==
In addition to Plautdietsch writing, Thiessen wrote about Yiddish and translated numerous works, including Antoine de Saint-Exupéry's The Little Prince into Plautdietsch. Thiessen is perhaps most well known for his influential Plautdietsch language dictionary. The 1977 edition of Thiessen's dictionary, published two years before Herman Rempel's dictionary, was the first published Plautdietsch dictionary, a language that had until then been primarily a spoken language. The dictionary has been expanded considerably in editions since then and been utilized by writers, such as Rudy Wiebe wishing to write, not just speak, in Plautdietsch. In 2020, he collaborated with writer Andrew Unger in translating a popular The Daily Bonnet post into Plautdietsch. He also wrote and published humorous Plautdietsch short stories about Mennonites, often collaborating with Al Reimer.

According to John Consadine, co-editor of Refractions of Germany in Canadian Literature and Culture, Thiessen's dedication to the study of Plautdietsch grew out of his desire to be a creative writer in the small language that was his mother tongue. Thiessen was a professor of German Studies at the University of Winnipeg for many years.

Thiessen was married to poet Audrey Poetker from 1991 until his death in 2022. Along with Poetker, he translated Bern G. Langin's The Russian Germans Under the Double Eagle and the Soviet Star into English. Since the 1990s, he lived in New Bothwell, Manitoba. Thiessen died in Steinbach, Manitoba, on 9 October 2022, at the age of 91.

== Publications ==
- Jack Thiessen: Yiddish in Canada: The death of a language. Schuster-Verlag, Leer 1973, ISBN 3796300405
- Al Reimer and Jack Thiessen (Hrsg.): A Sackful of Plautdietsch : A collection of Mennonite Low German stories and poems. Hyperion Press, Winnipeg 1983, ISBN 0-920534-25-2
- Jack Thiessen: Predicht fier haite. Buske-Verlag, Hamburg 1984, ISBN 3-87118-598-1
- Victor Peters and Jack Thiessen: Mennonitische Namen /Mennonite Names. Elwert-Verlag, Marburg 1987, ISBN 3-770808-52-5
- Victor Peters and Jack Thiessen: Plautdietsche Jeschichten: Gespräche – Interviews – Erzählungen. Elwert-Verlag, Marburg 1990 (in der Schriftenreihe der Kommission für Ostdeutsche Volkskunde in der Deutschen Gesellschaft für Volkskunde), ISBN 3-7708-0927-0
- Jack Thiessen: Tribute to Trucking. American Historical Press, Sun Valley 1990, ISBN 0897813464
- Antoine de Saint-Exupéry; Jack Thiessen (Übersetzer): Dee tjliena Prinz. Plautdietsch, hrsg. von Walter Sauer, Naumann-Verlag, Nidderau 2002 (Le petit prince in deutschen Mundarten, Band 15), ISBN 3-933575-85-0
- Wilhelm Busch; Jack Thiessen (Übersetzer): Max enn Moritz. Eene Jungesjeschijcht enn sewen Schowanacke, hrsg. von Walter Sauer, Edition Tintenfaß, Neckarsteinach 2003, ISBN 3-9808205-6-4
- Jack Thiessen: Mennonite Low German Dictionary = Mennonitisch-Plattdeutsches Wörterbuch. Max-Kade-Institute for German-American Studies, University of Wisconsin-Madison, Madison 2003, ISBN 0-924119-09-8
- Jack Thiessen: Dittsied. Plautdietsche Jeschichte, Tweeback-Verlag, Bonn 2011, ISBN 978-3-98119787-7
