= Al Reimer =

Canadian Mennonite writer (1927–2015)

Elmer E. 'Al' Reimer (1927–2015) was a Mennonite writer from Steinbach, Manitoba. Reimer was an important literary critic and writer in the emergence of southern Manitoba Mennonite literature during the 1970s and 80s. Born in Landmark, Manitoba, Reimer grew up in Steinbach and received his PhD at Yale University. He taught English literature at University of Winnipeg for many years.

Influenced by fellow Steinbach resident Arnold Dyck, when the new wave of Mennonite literature, such as Rudy Wiebe and Patrick Friesen, emerged in the 1970s, Reimer wrote and edited for publications such as the Mennonite Mirror and the Journal of Mennonite Studies, offering important literary analysis of Mennonite writing. He also wrote his own fiction, including the 1985 novel My Harp is Turned to Mourning, the short story collection When War Came To Kleindarp and other Kleindarp Stories in 2008, and Low German collaborations with Jack Thiessen. Reimer was also a noted translator of German and Plautdietsch language texts, including Dietrich Neufeld's A Russian Dance of Death and Hans Harder's No Strangers in Exile, both published by Hyperion Press. Reimer died in 2015.
