= Nightbitch (film) =

2024 film by Marielle Heller

- Theatrical release poster
- Directed by: Marielle Heller
- Screenplay by: Marielle Heller
- Based on: Nightbitch by Rachel Yoder
- Produced by: Anne Carey; Thiago Andreo Barbosa Nogueira; Marielle Heller; Sue Naegle; Christina Oh; Amy Adams; Stacy O'Neil
- Starring: Amy Adams; Scoot McNairy; Arleigh Snowden; Emmett Snowden; Zoë Chao; Mary Holland; Archana Rajan; Jessica Harper
- Cinematography: Brandon Trost
- Edited by: Anne McCabe
- Music by: Nate Heller
- Production companies: Annapurna Pictures; Archer Gray; Defiant by Nature; Bond Group Entertainment
- Distributed by: Searchlight Pictures
- Release dates: September 7, 2024 (TIFF); December 6, 2024 (United States)
- Running time: 99 minutes
- Country: United States
- Language: English
- Box office: $170,737

Nightbitch is a 2024 American black comedy body horror film written, produced and directed by Marielle Heller, based on the 2021 novel by Rachel Yoder. The film stars Amy Adams, Scoot McNairy, Arleigh Snowden, Emmett Snowden, Zoë Chao, Mary Holland, Archana Rajan, and Jessica Harper.

Nightbitch premiered at the Toronto International Film Festival on September 7, 2024, and was released theatrically in the United States by Searchlight Pictures on December 6, 2024. The film received mixed reviews from critics.

== Plot ==
Mother has paused her career as an artist to become a stay-at-home mom for her two-year-old son. Because her husband is away on work trips most of the time, she is responsible for the majority of the caregiving for the boy. Feeling isolated from her artistic identity and resentful of what she sees as the expectation to be friends with other mothers, she frequently fantasizes about lashing out at those around her. She begins to experience surreal physical changes, including patches of fur on her body, the growth of a tail and additional nipples, and heightened senses. Although she initially dismisses these developments as symptoms of emotional stress and perimenopause, she soon becomes convinced that she is turning into a dog.

She begins to dream about her childhood in a Mennonite society, including memories of her mother running on all fours and concocting stews with unusual ingredients. Seeking understanding, Mother visits the library to check out a book about mythical transformations, reinforcing her belief in her metamorphosis. Embracing her new identity, she adopts increasingly canine behaviors, finding liberation from societal expectations and a renewal of her artistic passions. She has her son play with dogs, eat from dog bowls and sleep in a dog bed, which calms him down and allows her to sleep through the night as she envisions herself transforming into a dog to run free. During these transformations, she kills small animals, including the family's pet cat.

When her husband questions these developments, Mother lashes out at him over his insensitivity to her needs; he tells her he is disappointed in her for shutting him out. They agree to a trial separation while she works on an art project. Mother realizes that her mother could also transform into a dog, and that her son's rebellious and willful nature indicates that she has passed the animal trait to her son.

The separation allows Mother to harmonize her animalistic and artistic identities. Eventually, Mother rekindles her relationship with her estranged husband as the two finally come to an understanding, reuniting the family. Some time later, Mother gives birth to her second child, a daughter.

== Cast ==
- Amy Adams as Mother
- Scoot McNairy as Husband
- Arleigh and Emmett Snowden as Son
- Jessica Harper as Norma
- Zoë Chao as Jen
- Mary Holland as Miriam
- Archana Rajan as Liz
- Darius De La Cruz as Lemuel
- Ella Thomas as Naya
- Stacey L. Swift as Frieda
- Adrienne Rose White as Sally
- Ros Gentle as Nana

== Production ==
In July 2020, Annapurna Pictures acquired the film rights to the then-unpublished Nightbitch, written by Rachel Yoder, with Amy Adams attached to star and produce. Stacy O'Neil of Adams' Bond Group Entertainment production company co-produced the film alongside Megan Ellison, Sue Naegle and Sammy Scher, while Yoder served as executive producer. Can You Ever Forgive Me? filmmaker Marielle Heller connected with Yoder's novel and began to develop the film alongside Adams during the COVID-19 pandemic.

In March 2022, filming was scheduled to begin in the fall of that year. In May, Searchlight Pictures acquired distribution rights from Annapurna for $25 million, winning out from five other bidders. At this time, Heller's involvement was officially confirmed. Christina Oh, Adam Paulsen, and Heller had boarded the film as producers, while Scher moved to executive producer with Havilah Brewster. In June 2022, Scoot McNairy joined the film. Production was intended to begin in September 2022 in Los Angeles. It began in October 2022, with the announcement that Ella Thomas had joined the cast. In October 2022, Mary Holland joined the cast. Zoë Chao was also confirmed to be in the cast.

== Release ==
Nightbitch was originally set to be released on Hulu, but was later announced for a theatrical release by Searchlight Pictures for December 6, 2024. It premiered at the Toronto International Film Festival on September 7, 2024. Nightbitch was released on the streaming service Hulu on December 27, 2024.

== Reception ==
=== Critical response ===
On the review aggregator website Rotten Tomatoes, 59% of 220 critics' reviews are positive, with an average rating of 6/10. The website's consensus reads: "As far as adaptations go, Nightbitch packs more bark than bite as the stellar Amy Adams takes on motherhood and the neighborhood in a rather conventional romp." Metacritic, which uses a weighted average, assigned the film a score of 56 out of 100, based on 53 critics, indicating "mixed or average" reviews.

=== Accolades ===
Award/Festival	Date of ceremony	Category	Recipient(s)	Result	Ref.
Toronto International Film Festival	September 8, 2024	Tribute Performer Award	Amy Adams	Won	
Sitges Film Festival	October 13, 2024	Best Motion Picture	Nightbitch	Nominated	
Mill Valley Film Festival	October 16, 2024	MVFF Acting Award	Amy Adams	Won	
La Roche-sur-Yon International Film Festival	October 20, 2024	Prix Variété MadMovies	Nightbitch	Won	
Montclair Film Festival	October 27, 2024	Director Award	Marielle Heller	Honored	
Chicago International Film Festival	October 27, 2024	Visionary Award	Marielle Heller	Honored	
Savannah Film Festival	November 2, 2024	Outstanding Achievement in Cinema Award	Amy Adams	Won	
Michigan Movie Critics Guild	December 6, 2024	Best Actress	Amy Adams	Nominated	
San Diego Film Critics Society Awards	December 9, 2024	Best Actress	Amy Adams	Runner-up	
Golden Globe Awards	January 5, 2025	Best Actress – Motion Picture Musical or Comedy	Amy Adams	Nominated	
Set Decorators Society of America	February 2, 2025	Best Achievement in Décor/Design of a Comedy or Musical Feature Film	Ryan Watson, Karen Murphy	Nominated	
Artios Awards	February 12, 2025	Outstanding Achievement in Casting – Big Budget Feature (Comedy)	Douglas Aibel, Matthew Glasner	Nominated	
Independent Spirit Awards	February 22, 2025	Best Lead Performance	Amy Adams	Nominated	
Independent Spirit Awards	February 22, 2025	Best Editing	Anne McCabe	Nominated	
