= The Salvation of Yasch Siemens =

1984 novel by Armin Wiebe

- Author: Armin Wiebe
- Language: English
- Published: 1984 (Turnstone Press)
- Publication place: Canada
- Media type: Print (paperback)
- Pages: 176 pp (first edition)

The Salvation of Yasch Siemens is the first novel by the Canadian author Armin Wiebe. The book tells the story of Yasch and his love interest Oata set in the fictional Mennonite community of Gutenthal. The book, published by Turnstone Press, was shortlisted for the Stephen Leacock Memorial Medal for Humour and was an important milestone in Mennonite literature, being one of the first Mennonite novels in English to incorporate humour. The book is also known for its Plautdietschisms. Wiebe followed up the book with five more novels set in Gutenthal. A thirty-fifth anniversary edition of The Salvation of Yasch Siemens was published by Turnstone in 2019 with an afterword by Nathan Dueck.
