= Once Removed =

Once Removed may refer to:

- Once removed, a cousin with one removal of generational separation
- Once Removed, a novel by Andrew Unger
- First Cousin Once Removed, a 2012 documentary
- Once Removed, an episode in series 4 of Inside No. 9
