= Audrey Poetker =

Canadian writer

- Born: 1962; Steinbach, Manitoba, Canada
- Occupation: Poet
- Spouse: Jack Thiessen (m. 1991; died 2022)
- Writing career
- Period: 1980s–present
- Notable work: standing all the night through

Audrey Poetker (born 1962) is a Canadian poet and translator from New Bothwell, Manitoba.

== Career ==
Born in Steinbach, Manitoba, Poetker grew up in a Mennonite home in rural Manitoba. She began publishing poetry in the 1980s and is the author of three volumes of poetry: i sing for my dead in german (1986), standing all the night through (1992) (writing as Audrey Poetker-Thiessen) and Making Strange to Yourself (1999), all published by Turnstone Press. standing all the night through was a finalist for the McNally Robinson Book of the Year Award. Along with Di Brandt her work is considered an important early example of secular Mennonite poetry and, along with Armin Wiebe, she is noted for the use of untranslated Plautdietsch (Mennonite Low German) words within her texts.

Poetker was married to lexicographer Jack Thiessen from 1991 until his death in 2022, with whom she has translated Bern G. Langin's The Russian Germans Under the Double Eagle and the Soviet Star into English.
