= Andrew Unger =

Canadian writer

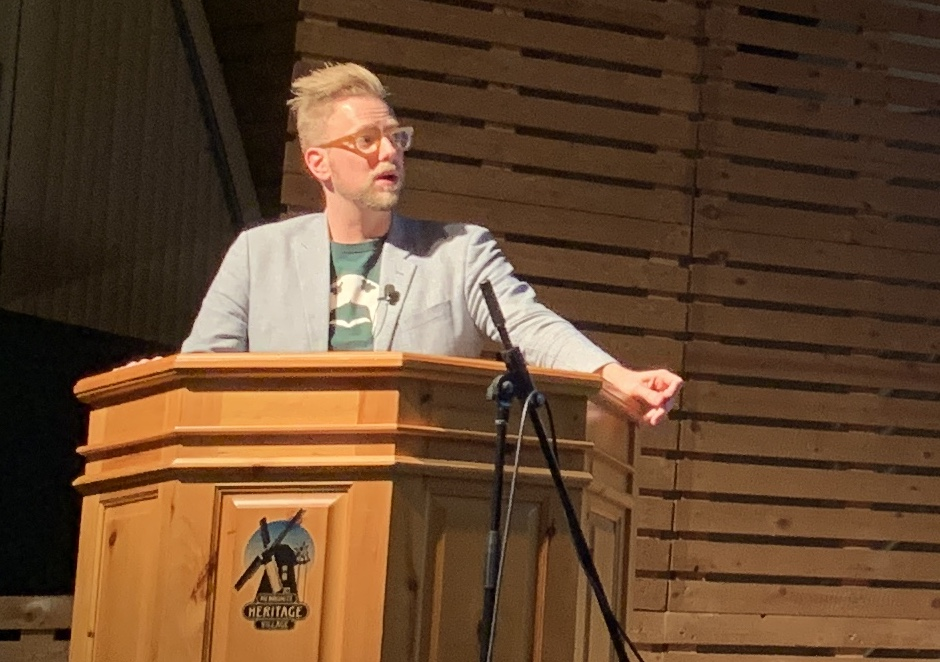
- Born: November 8, 1979 (age 47); Winnipeg, Manitoba, Canada
- Education: University of Manitoba
- Occupations: Novelist, satirist
- Spouse: Erin Koop Unger
- Writing career
- Period: 2010–present
- Genres: Satire, humour
- Notable works: Once Removed; The Best of the Bonnet; The Unger Review
- Notable awards: Eileen McTavish Sykes Award (2021)
- Website: andrewunger.com

Andrew Unger (born November 8, 1979) is a Canadian novelist and satirist. He is the author of the satirical news website The Unger Review (formerly The Daily Bonnet), as well as the novel Once Removed and the collection The Best of the Bonnet.

== Early life ==
The son of a Mennonite minister father and book-keeper mother, Unger was born in Winnipeg in 1979 and lived in Steinbach, Brandon and Calgary as a child before returning to Steinbach as an adult. From his father's side, he is a direct descendant of Kleine Gemeinde founder Klaas Reimer, while his maternal grandfather fled to Canada from the Soviet Union as a refugee in the 1920s.

As a child he turned to satire, drawing political cartoons, particularly of Canadian Prime Minister Brian Mulroney. Unger attended Providence University College in the late 1990s and holds degrees from the University of Manitoba.

== Writing Career ==
=== Writing ===
Since 2010, Unger has been a contributor to numerous publications including The Globe and Mail, Geist, Geez, CBC.ca, and Ballast. Early in his career, he also wrote and published fiction and poetry, sometimes publishing under the pen name Andrew J. Bergman, as well as working as a ghostwriter for New York-based Kevin Anderson & Associates.

Unger cites Jonathan Swift, Sinclair Lewis, Armin Wiebe, Billy Wilder, and Miriam Toews among his writing influences. His work has been described as Horatian satire by scholar Nathan Dueck and compared to Armin Wiebe and Arnold Dyck by scholar Robert Zacharias.

=== Website ===
In 2016, Unger founded the Mennonite satirical news website The Daily Bonnet and, along with his wife Erin Koop Unger, the non-satirical website Mennotoba in 2017. Since 2016, Unger has written more than two thousand Daily Bonnet articles. The website has been visited millions of times each year and has been cited in debate in the Manitoba Legislature and used as an example of Mennonite humour in the Canadian House of Commons.

In 2023, Unger changed the name of The Daily Bonnet to The Unger Review, while maintaining The Daily Bonnet as a section of the website.

== Personal ==
In 2021, during the COVID-19 pandemic, Unger successfully advocated for the Manitoba government to create vaccine stickers in the Mennonite dialect of Plautdietsch. In 2024, Unger initiated a fundraiser to place an historic plaque in front of author Miriam Toews's former home in Steinbach.He has taught English Language Arts, including satire and creative writing, at Steinbach Regional Secondary School since 2005. Unger and Neal Rohne coached the school's Reach for the Top team to a provincial championship in 2022.

Unger lives in Steinbach, Manitoba and is married to author Erin Koop Unger.

== Works ==
=== Novels ===
- Once Removed (2020), published by Turnstone Press.

=== Humour collections ===
- The Best of the Bonnet (2021), a collection of articles from The Daily Bonnet, published by Turnstone Press.

=== Websites ===
- The Daily Bonnet, a satirical news website founded in 2016 and renamed The Unger Review in 2023.
- Mennotoba, a website about Mennonite life and culture, founded in 2017 with Erin Koop Unger.

== Awards and honours ==
- 2020: Margaret McWilliams Award, finalist for Once Removed.
- 2021: Eileen McTavish Sykes Award for best first book, for Once Removed.
