= Once Removed (novel) =

2020 novel by Andrew Unger

- Author: Andrew Unger
- Language: English
- Published: 2020 (Turnstone Press)
- Publication place: Canada
- Media type: Print (paperback)
- Pages: 272 pp (first edition)

Once Removed is a novel by Canadian author Andrew Unger published in 2020. Published by Turnstone Press, the book is a satire set in the fictional town of Edenfeld, Manitoba, and tells the story of Timothy Heppner, a ghostwriter trying to preserve the history of his small Mennonite town.

== Plot summary ==
At the beginning of the novel, Timothy Heppner is working for the town's Parks and Recreation Department, removing trees and destroying historic buildings to make room for strip malls. He also sidelines as a ghostwriter writing family history and genealogy books for locals, but finds he is losing clients. Eventually, he is tasked with writing a thorough and true history of the town and, along with his wife Katie and the town's Preservation Society, he attempts to preserve the house of a famous local writer Elsie Dyck, who's been cast out of town for writing negatively about it. In the process, he comes into conflict with the town's mayor who is set on gentrification and boosterism.

== Main characters ==
Timothy Heppner – a struggling ghostwriter tasked with writing a history of Edenfeld. Also works for the town's Parks and Rec department. Married to Katie.
Katie Brandt-Heppner – a university student finishing her master's degree. Married to Timothy.
B.L.T. Wiens – the "progressive" mayor of Edenfeld, intent on gentrification and the destruction of the town's past.
Elsie Dyck – a famous writer from Edenfeld, who has not been seen in town in decades.
Randall Hiebert – Timothy's friend and fellow ghostwriter.
Brenda from Loans – a heavily tattooed member of the Preservation Society. Also works for the local credit union.
Mrs. Friesen – an assertive and knowledgeable member of the local Preservation Society.
Dietrich F. Harder – one of Timothy's ghostwriting clients.

== Reception and awards ==
Once Removed won the Eileen McTavish Sykes Awards for Best First Book at the Manitoba Book Awards in 2021 and was shortlisted for the 2020 Margaret McWilliams Award for best popular history book. It was also selected for the Winnipeg Free Press book club in May 2021. Due to its themes of heritage and historic preservation, the novel was listed as a Recommended Read by the National Trust for Canada in 2021.

In reference to the book's humour, Morley Walker, in a review for the Winnipeg Free Press called the book a "good-natured ribbing of Mennonite culture," while saying that "you don’t need to be a Menno to find (Unger) amusing, but it won’t hurt." Walker also suggests the town of Edenfeld is a "fill-in" for Steinbach, Manitoba, and that the fictional Elsie Dyck may have been inspired by the real-life author Miriam Toews, although Unger himself notes the reception of authors Rudy Wiebe, Di Brandt, Sinclair Lewis and Margaret Laurence within their communities as additional inspirations for the character.

Scholar Robert Zacharias has cited Once Removed, along with Casey Plett's work, as representative of a shift in Mennonite literature by depicting characters who have chosen to stay within their communities, rather than leaving them, and has also pointed out metafictional allusions to other Mennonite writers such as Miriam Toews, Di Brandt, and David Bergen within the book. Scholar Nathan Dueck has called the book a künstlerroman in its portrayal of Timothy Heppner's growth as a writer.
