= Margaret Stovel McWilliams =

Canadian historian

Margaret Stovel McWilliams (1875–1952) was a Canadian historian.

McWilliams was born in Toronto in 1875 where in 1898 she attended the University of Toronto. Later on she became a journalist in Detroit and emigrated to Winnipeg by 1910 where she joined the women's movement. During her life she was representing Canada during the foreign affairs. In 1913, she was elected at the University Women's Club and by 1922 became the first President of the Canadian Federation of University Women. In 1928, she wrote a book called Manitoba Milestones and three years later wrote another one called If I Were King of Canada. From 1933 to 1940, she served as the Winnipeg's second female Alderman and four years later served as a President of the Manitoba Historical Society for four years. In 1948, she wrote her third and last book called This New Canada after which she married Roland F. McWilliams. She died on April 12, 1952, at the Government House and was buried at the Old Kildonan Cemetery.

== Memory ==
In 1955, Manitoba Historical Society have commissioned an award in her honour called the Margaret McWilliams Award.
