= Ballast (website) =

Inactive Canadian news website

- Website type: Current events, culture
- Available in: English
- Website: ballastmag.com
- Launched: 2012
- Current status: inactive

Ballast was a Canadian website about current events and culture. The site was founded in 2012 by Paul Hiebert and Jonathan Hall. Ballast contributors include writers for The Globe and Mail, The Awl, The Walrus, The CBC, Maclean's, The New York Times, and others. The site is considered to be the first Canadian site of its kind, modelling itself after American websites such as Gawker and The Dish. In 2016, former Ballast writer Andrew Unger started The Daily Bonnet.
