= Merle Good =

American writer (born 1946)

- Born: 1946
- Education: Eastern Mennonite University
- Occupations: writer, publisher
- Writing career
- Period: 1970s–present
- Notable work: Happy as the Grass Was Green

Merle Good (born February 10, 1946) is an American author and publisher born in Lancaster County, Pennsylvania. He is best known for his 1971 novel Happy as the Grass was Green, an important work of American Mennonite literature, which was adapted into the film Hazel's People.

== Career ==
Good is the author of several books including Happy as the Grass was Green (1971), These People Mine (1973), Today Pop Goes Home (1993), Going Places (1994), Surviving Failure (and a Few Successes) (2018), and Christine’s Turn (2022). He has also written numerous children's books and some works of non-fiction.

Good is the also the founder of Good Enterprises, which publishes cookbooks, how-to books, and other books with Mennonite and Amish themes. In 2018, he started a new publishing company Walnut Street Books.

== Early life ==
Good grew up in Lancaster, Pennsylvania and earned a BA at Eastern Mennonite College, now Eastern Mennonite University in Harrisonburg, Virginia and a MDiv at Union Theological Seminary (New York City) in 1972.
