= Flanagan, Illinois =

- Village
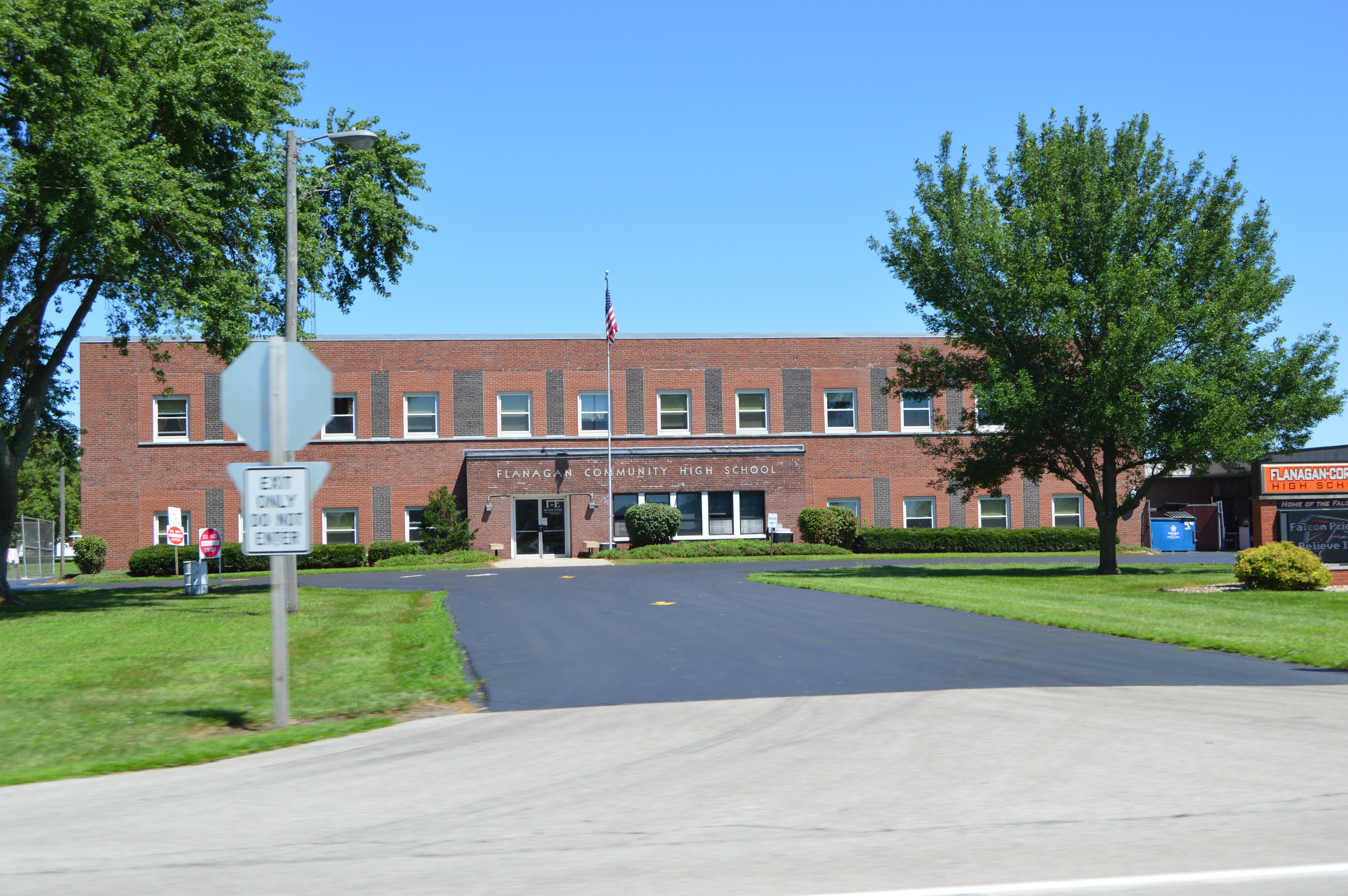
- Flanagan high school on Illinois Route 116

- Location in Livingston County, Illinois
- Coordinates: 40°52′30″N 88°51′35″W
- Country: United States
- State: Illinois
- County: Livingston
- Township: Nebraska

Area
  - Total: 0.58 sq mi (1.49 km^{2})
  - Land: 0.58 sq mi (1.49 km^{2})
  - Water: 0 sq mi (0.00 km^{2})
- Elevation: 673 ft (205 m)

Population (2020)
  - Total: 1,010
  - Density: 1,754.8/sq mi (677.54/km^{2})
- Time zone: UTC-6 (CST)
  - Summer (DST): UTC-5 (CDT)
- ZIP code: 61740
- Area code: 815
- FIPS code: 17-26311
- GNIS feature ID: 2398882
- Website: www.flanaganil.org

Flanagan is a village in Livingston County, Illinois, United States. As of the 2020 census, Flanagan had a population of 1,010.

== Geography ==
Flanagan is located in western Livingston County. Illinois Route 116 passes along the southern edge of the village, leading east 12 miles (19 km) to Pontiac, the county seat, and west 10 miles (16 km) to Woodford.

According to the 2021 census gazetteer files, Flanagan has a total area of 0.58 square miles (1.50 km^{2}), of which 0.57 square miles (1.48 km^{2}) (or 99.83%) is land and 0.00 square miles (0.00 km^{2}) (or 0.17%) is water. A small man-made lake (originally four separate lakes, some being filled in), called the Legion Lake, is located on the west side of the village. A walking trail surrounds it and a park shelter is located on the site. Artesian Park, another small park within the village boundaries, is located on the east side of town. It boasts two picnic shelters, a tennis court and playground equipment. A small business district of roughly one block in length is located in the center of town. Just north of this, the Flanagan Co-op can be found, a complex of several grain elevators and silos at Main and Lumber streets.

== Demographics ==
Historical population
Census	Pop.	Note	%±
1890	384		—
1900	509		32.6%
1910	590		15.9%
1920	637		8.0%
1930	631		−0.9%
1940	663		5.1%
1950	672		1.4%
1960	841		25.1%
1970	976		16.1%
1980	978		0.2%
1990	987		0.9%
2000	1,083		9.7%
2010	1,110		2.5%
2020	1,010		−9.0%
U.S. Decennial Census

As of the 2020 census there were 1,010 people, 381 households, and 252 families residing in the village. The population density was 1,756.52 inhabitants per square mile (678.20/km^{2}). There were 494 housing units at an average density of 859.13 per square mile (331.71/km^{2}). Of the 494 housing units, 14.8% were vacant. The homeowner vacancy rate was 2.8% and the rental vacancy rate was 15.2%.

The racial makeup of the village was 93.47% White, 0.69% African American, 0.10% Native American, 1.19% Asian, 0.00% Pacific Islander, 0.79% from other races, and 3.76% from two or more races. Hispanic or Latino of any race were 2.48% of the population.

There were 381 households, out of which 24.1% had children under the age of 18 living with them, 54.59% were married couples living together, 5.77% had a female householder with no husband present, and 33.86% were non-families. 32.02% of all households were made up of individuals, and 23.62% had someone living alone who was 65 years of age or older. The average household size was 2.74 and the average family size was 2.24.

The village's age distribution consisted of 18.0% under the age of 18, 8.6% from 18 to 24, 17% from 25 to 44, 21.3% from 45 to 64, and 35.1% who were 65 years of age or older. The median age was 52.1 years. For every 100 females, there were 81.8 males. For every 100 females age 18 and over, there were 83.5 males.

The median income for a household in the village was $62,841, and the median income for a family was $78,750. Males had a median income of $50,625 versus $31,667 for females. The per capita income for the village was $38,163. About 0.8% of families and 5.4% of the population were below the poverty line, including 1.2% of those under age 18 and 8.3% of those age 65 or over.

Racial composition as of the 2020 census
Race	Number	Percent
White	944	93.5%
Black or African American	7	0.7%
American Indian and Alaska Native	1	0.1%
Asian	12	1.2%
Native Hawaiian and Other Pacific Islander	0	0.0%
Some other race	8	0.8%
Two or more races	38	3.8%
Hispanic or Latino (of any race)	25	2.5%

== Notable people ==
- Lois Gunden, recipient of the title Righteous Among the Nations by Yad Vashem
- Jeff Gundy, poet
