= Reuben Epp =

Canadian Plautdietsch author

Reuben Epp (March 1, 1920 – June 20, 2009) was an author of works in Plautdietsch (Mennonite Low German).

== Early life ==
Epp's parents were Russian Mennonites who emigrated from Russia to Canada, where Epp was born in Saskatoon, Saskatchewan in 1920.

== Career ==
Among Russian Mennonites, Epp is one of the best known poets and story tellers working in Plautdietsch, alongside Arnold Dyck and Jack Thiessen. His accomplishments include publications on the history of Plautdietsch and on its orthography. Epp's name is rendered "Ruben Ap" in Plautdietsch.

Epp was educated as a mechanic and became an instructor at a vocational school for mechanics. Later he became the director of a vocational school in Dawson Creek, British Columbia. Epp died in Kelowna, British Columbia, Canada in 2009.

== Works ==
- Biem Aunsiedle: When the settlers came; plautdietsche Jechichte een Resse ut'e Vergangenheit (Winnipeg, Canada 1972)
- Plautdietsche Schreftsteckja: Jedichta, Jeschichte, Leeda, Spelkjes (Steinbach, Manitoba 1972)
- Onse Lied Vetahle [Audio Archive]: Stories our people tell; plautdietsche Jeschichte enn Riemsels (Winnipeg, Manitoba 1973)
- The Story of Low German and Plautdietsch: Tracing a Language Across the Globe (Hillsboro, USA 1993) ISBN 0-9638494-0-9
- The Spelling of Low German & Plautdietsch: Towards An Official Plautdietsch Orthography (Hillsboro, USA 1996) ISBN 0-9638494-1-7
- Dit un jant opp Plautdietsch: This and that in Mennonite Low German (Hillsboro, USA 1997) ISBN 0-9638494-2-5
- Dit un Jant opp Plautdietsch [CD, 17 pieces by Reuben Epp, live recording, lecture on October 7, 2000 in Lage/Lippe, Germany], published by Plautdietsch-Freunde e. V. (Detmold 2006)
