= H. Clare Pentland =

Canadian economic historian

Harry Clare Pentland (17 October 1914 – 1978) was a Canadian economic historian. Pentland studied labour and economic history. He served as president of the Manitoba Historical Society from 1963 to 1965. In 1970, the MHS awarded him a Manitoba Centennial Medal. His papers are held at the University of Manitoba Archives.

== Career ==
Pentland was born on a farm near Justice, Manitoba on 17 October 1914. He was raised in Brandon, Manitoba. He graduated from Brandon Collegiate (1931) and Brandon Normal School (1933) and Brandon College (1940) before leaving Manitoba to attend the University of Oregon from 1940 to 1942, where he earned an M.A. Thereafter, he served in the Canadian Army during World War II. He earned his PhD in History at the University of Toronto in 1961.

From 1949 until his death in 1978, he taught at the University of Manitoba.

== Work ==
Pentland argued against the "staples thesis", which posited that Canada developed as it did because of the nature of its staple commodities: raw materials, such as fish, fur, lumber, agricultural products and minerals, that were exported to Britain and the West Indies. This trading link cemented Canada's cultural links to Britain. The search for and exploitation of these staples led to the creation of institutions that defined the political culture of the nation and its regions. This thesis, which was most prominently argued by Pentland's former academic supervisor at the University of Toronto Harold Innis as well as W. A. Mackintosh, was widely accepted during the middle portion of the 20th century. Pentland, in contrast, has been praised as being "among the first to attempt to bring labour and class issues to the fore of development issues in Canada." Historian of the Canadian working-class Gregory Kealey argues that "the value of Pentland’s work is located in its break with other existing North American schools of labour studies. Not only did his work depart significantly from the predominant staples interpretation of Canadian economic history by focusing on the development of industrial capitalism in Canada, but it also showed no affiliation with the predominant modes of labour studies." Kealey also notes that "if Pentland’s Manitoba loyalties were evident in his writings on western labour, his Canadian nationalism also emerges strongly in his last essays."

== Published works ==
- The Development of a Capitalistic Labour Market in Canada The Canadian Journal of Economics and Political Science, Vol. 25, No. 4 (Nov., 1959), pp. 450–461
- A Study of the Changing Social, Economic, and Political Background of the Canadian System of Industrial Relations (1968) Task Force on Labour Relations.
- Labour and Capital in Canada 1650-1860 (1981), James Lorimer & Co. (published posthumously)
