= Peace Shall Destroy Many =

1962 novel by Rudy Wiebe

- Author: Rudy Wiebe
- Language: English
- Published: 1962 (McClelland & Stewart)
- Publication place: Canada
- Media type: Print (hardback & paperback)
- Pages: 239 pp (first edition, hardcover)

Peace Shall Destroy Many is the first novel by Canadian author Rudy Wiebe. The novel surrounds the lives of pacifist Mennonites in Saskatchewan during World War II. The book generated considerable controversy in the Canadian Mennonite community when it was first published, forcing Wiebe to resign his position as editor of the Mennonite Brethren Herald. The book is considered the first novel about Canadian Mennonites written in English and spurred on a wave of Mennonite literature in the decades after its publication.
