= Jeff Gundy =

American poet (born 1952)

- Born: Jeffrey Gene Gundy; 1952 (age 73–74); Flanagan, Illinois, U.S.
- Occupation: Poet

Jeffrey Gene Gundy (born 1952 Flanagan, Illinois) is an American poet of Mennonite descent based in Ohio. Gundy has written eight books of poetry and four books of creative nonfiction and literary criticism, and was awarded the Ohio Poet of the Year in 2015. He teaches at Bluffton University. He debuted with Inquiries in 1992, followed by Flatlands in 1995. His subsequent books of poems include Without a Plea, Somewhere Near Defiance, Abandoned Homeland, Spoken among the Trees, Rhapsody with Dark Matter and Deerflies. His prose books include Songs from an Empty Cage: Poetry, Mystery, Anabaptism, and Peace, and A Community of Memory: My Days with George and Clara. He is also known as an important contributor to Mennonite literary criticism.
