= Sarah Klassen =

Canadian writer

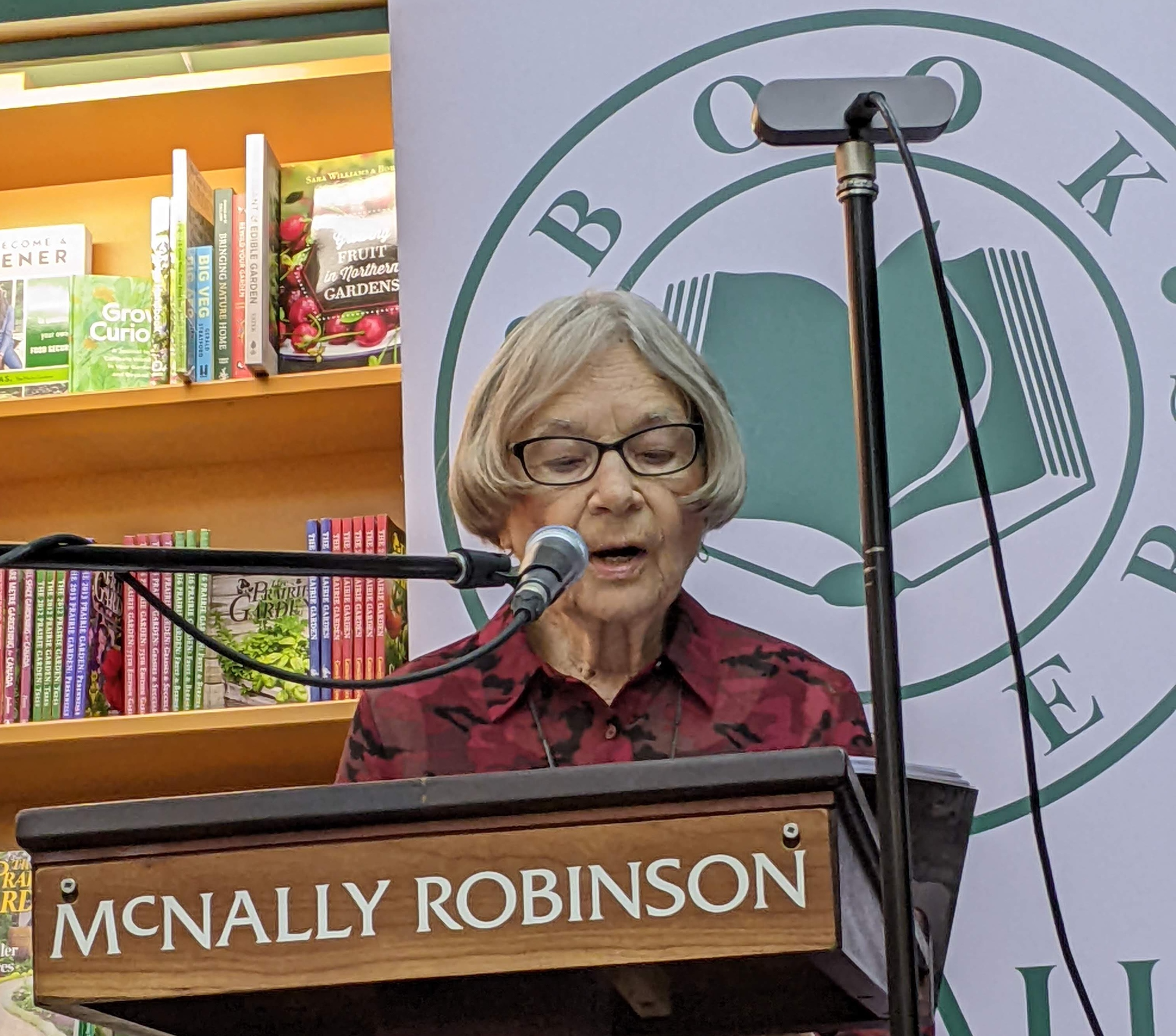
Sarah Klassen reading at the launch of The Russian Daughter at McNally Robinson Bookstore Winnipeg, 19 January 2023.

Sarah Klassen (born 6 October 1932) is a Canadian writer and retired educator living in Winnipeg, Manitoba. Klassen's first volume of poetry, Journey to Yalta, was awarded the Gerald Lampert Memorial Award in 1989. Klassen is the recipient of Canadian Authors Association Award for Poetry and Klassen's novel, The Wittenbergs, was awarded the Margaret McWilliams Award for popular history.

== Career ==
Sarah Klassen was born in Winnipeg, Manitoba, and currently resides there. She holds a Bachelor of Arts degree and a Bachelor of Education degree from the University of Winnipeg. Sarah Klassen taught English in the public school system in Winnipeg, and at summer institutes in Lithuania and Ukraine. Klassen has been recognized as part of a flourishing of Mennonite novelists and poets emerging in the 1980s. A subject of Klassen's writing (in Journey to Yalta, The Wittenbergs and The Russian Daughter) is the experiences and locations of Russian Mennonite settlements in the early part of the twentieth century, a topic relayed to her in stories by her own mother.

Sarah Klassen has served as poetry editor for Prairie Fire and editor of Sophia magazine.

== Bibliography ==
=== Novels ===
- The Wittenbergs, Winnipeg: Turnstone Press (2013)
- The Russian Daughter, Winnipeg: CMU Press (2022)

=== Poetry ===
- Journey to Yalta, Winnipeg: Turnstone Press (1988)
- Violence and Mercy, Windsor: Netherlandic Press (1991)
- Borderwatch, Windsor: Netherlandic Press (1993)
- Dangerous Elements, Kingston: Quarry Press (1998)
- Simone Weil: Songs of Hunger and Love, Hamilton: Wolsak and Wynn (1999)
- A Curious Beatitude, Winnipeg: The Muses' Company (2006)
- Monstrance, Winnipeg: Turnstone Press (2012)
- Tree of Life, Winnipeg: Turnstone Press (2020)
- Sarah Klassen: New & Selected Poems, Edited by Nathan Dueck, Lyrik Poetry Series, Winnipeg: CMU Press (2024)

=== Short stories ===
- The Peony Season, Winnipeg: Turnstone Press (2000)
- A Feast of Longing, Regina, SK: Coteau Books (2007)

=== Translation ===
- Wonder-Work: Selected Sonnets of Catharina Regina von Greiffenberg, Translated by Joanne Epp, Sally Ito, and Sarah Klassen, Winnipeg: CMU Press (2023)

=== Edited works ===
- Poets in the Classroom, edited by Betsy Struthers and Sarah Klassen, Markham, ON: Pembrook Publishers (1995)
- Lithuania Christian College: A Work in Progress, edited by Sarah Klassen, Winnipeg: Leona DeFehr, Publisher (2001).

=== Anthologies ===
- A Century of Poetry: 100 Poems for Searching the Heart, by Rowen Williams, London, UK: SPCK (2022)
- The Turning Aside: The Kingdom Poets Book of Contemporary Christian Poetry, edited by D.S. Martin (2016)
- Pith & Wry: Canadian Poetry, edited by Susan McMaster, Scrivener Press (2010)
- Northern Lights: An Anthology of Contemporary Christian Writing in Canada, edited by Byron Rempel-Burkholder and Dora Dueck, Mississauga, ON: John Wiley & Sons Canada (2008)
- Poetry as Liturgy: An Anthology of Canadian Poets, edited by Margo Swiss, St. Thomas Press (2007)
- Imagine a World: Poetry for Peacemakers, edited by Peggy Rosenthal, Pax Christi USA (2005)
- A Capella, edited by Ann Hostetler, University of Iowa Press (2003)
- Waging Peace, edited by Susan McMaster, Penumbra Press (2002)
- Smaller Than God, edited by Brother Paul Quenon and John B. Lee (2002)
- Line By Line, edited by Heather Spears, Ekstasis Editions (2002)
- Snapshots: The New Canadian Fiction, edited by Kristina Russelo, Wiley (2008), Black Moss Press (1992)
- All are Witnesses: A Collection of Sermons by Mennonite Brethren Women, edited by Delores Friesen, Winnipeg: Kindred Productions (1996)
- Out of Place: Stories and Poems, edited by Judith Krause and Ven Begamudré, Coteau Books (1991)
- Buffaloberries and Saskatoons, edited by Hendrika Ruger, Netherlandic Press (1991)
- Liars and Rascals: Mennonite Short Stories, edited by Hildi Froese Tiessen, University of Waterloo Press, (1989)
- Tongue Screws and Testimonies: Poems, stories, and essays inspired by the Martyrs Mirror, edited by Kirsten Eve Beachy, Herald Press (2010)

=== Limited editions (chapbooks and artist books) ===
- Winter is Past: Two Poems by Catharina Regina von Greiffenberg, translation by Joanne Epp, Sally Ito, and Sarah Klassen; designed and produced by Joanne Epp at Spy Tower Press, Winnipeg (2020)
- Train Country Emigrant, edited by Lois Klassen (Reading the Migration Library), Vancouver: Light Factory Publications (2017)

== Awards ==
- Winner, Gerald Lampert Memorial Award, 1989 (Journey to Yalta)
- Winner, Margaret McWilliams Award for Popular History, 2013 (The Wittenbergs)
- Winner, High Plains Book Award, 2008 (A Feast of Longing)
- Winner, Poetry, Word Guild, 2013 (Monstrance)
- Short-listed, Margaret Laurence Award, 2001 (The Peony Season), 2008 (A Feast of Longing), 2014 (The Wittenbergs), 2023 (The Russian Daughter)
- Winner, Canadian Authors Association Poetry Prize, 2007 (A Curious Beatitude)
- Gold, The National Magazine Award for Poetry, 1991
- Silver, The National Magazine Award for Poetry, 2017
- Shortlisted, McNally Robinson Book of the Year Award (Violence and Mercy, Dangerous Elements, Simone Weil: Songs of Hunger and Love, and Monstrance)
- Nominated, Aqua Lansdowne Prize for Poetry
