= Plautdietsch-Freunde =

Plautdietsch-Freunde is a Detmold-based non-profit organization with the goal of documenting, nurturing, and promoting the Plautdietsch language. Mennonite speakers of Plautdietsch who emigrated from West Prussia through Southern Russia (present-day Ukraine), and who now live in Germany, Canada, Paraguay, and other parts of the world, are also known as Russian Mennonites and have been united by religious practices. Through its web resources and its journal Plautdietsch FRIND, Plautdietsch-Freunde offers an international forum for all those who speak, read, write, or simply have an interest in the language. The organization was founded by Peter Wiens in 1999, acting president is Heinrich Siemens.
