= Betsy Struthers =

Canadian poet and novelist (born 1951)

- Born: 1951 (age 74–75); Toronto, Ontario, Canada
- Occupations: poet, novelist

Betsy Struthers (born 1951) is a Canadian poet and novelist who lives in Peterborough, Ontario. She was co-editor (with Sarah Klassen) and contributor to Poets in the Classroom, an anthology of essays about teaching poetry workshops written by members of the League of Canadian Poets. She was president of the League from 1995 to 1997 and has served as chair of its Education Committee and Feminist Caucus. She works as a freelance editor of academic non-fiction texts. Her book Still won the 2004 Pat Lowther Award for the best book of poetry by a Canadian woman.

== Works ==
- Censored Letters (Mosaic Press, 1984), ISBN 0-88962-250-7
- Saying So out Loud (Mosaic Press, 1988), ISBN 0-88962-398-8
- Found: A Body (fiction) (Simon & Pierre, 1992), ISBN 0-88924-237-2
- Running out of Time (Wolsak and Wynn, 1993), ISBN 0-919897-35-5
- Grave Deeds (fiction) (Simon & Pierre, 1994), ISBN 0-88924-257-7
- Poets in the Classroom (ed.) (Pembroke, 1995), ISBN 1-55138-055-2
- A Studied Death (fiction) (Simon & Pierre, 1995), ISBN 0-88924-266-6
- Virgin Territory (Wolsak and Wynn, 1996), ISBN 0-919897-51-7
- Driven (Black Moss Press, 2000), ISBN 0-88753-345-0
- Still (Black Moss Press, 2003), ISBN 0-88753-378-7
- In Her Fifties (Black Moss Press, 2005), ISBN 0-88753-402-3

== See also ==
List of Canadian poets
