= Charles Davis (actor) =

Irish actor (1925–2009)

- Publicity Photo of Charles Davis
- Born: 31 August 1925
- Died: 12 December 2009 (aged 84)

Charles Davis (31 August 1925 – 12 December 2009) was an Irish character actor, writer and director. He was born in Dublin, Ireland.

== Career ==
Davis started his acting career at the Abbey Theatre in Dublin and had over 1,000 performances on Broadway.

Davis appeared in over 20 movies and over 100 TV shows. Among his movies were The Desert Rats, The King's Thief, The Young Stranger and The Wreck of the Mary Deare. The TV shows he appeared in included Dynasty, Lock-Up, Alfred Hitchcock Presents, The Cara Williams Show, Night Gallery,The Wild Wild West and Leave It to Beaver.

Davis was also a writer, director and film producer. He wrote, directed and produced feature films including Kennedy’s Ireland, Thunder Run, Happy as the Grass Was Green (also released under the title Hazel’s People) and The Violent Ones.

== Death ==
Davis died from a heart attack on 12 December 2009, aged 84, in Thousand Oaks, California.

== Filmography ==
Year	Title	Role	Notes
1951	The Man from Planet X	Geordie, Man at Dock	Uncredited
1951	The Desert Fox: The Story of Rommel	Signal Man	Uncredited
1953	Rogue's March	Corporal Biggs	
1953	The Desert Rats	Pete	
1954	The Student Prince	Hubert	
1955	Soldier of Fortune	Hotel Desk Clerk	Uncredited
1955	Moonfleet	Sentry	Uncredited
1955	The King's Thief	Apothecary	
1957	Alfred Hitchcock Presents	Detective Raines	Season 2 Episode 25: "I Killed the Count Part 1"
1957	Alfred Hitchcock Presents	Detective Raines	Season 2 Episode 26: "I Killed the Count Part 2"
1957	Alfred Hitchcock Presents	Detective Raines	Season 2 Episode 27: "I Killed the Count Part 3"
1957	Alfred Hitchcock Presents	Reporter	Season 2 Episode 32: "The Hands of Mr. Ottermole"
1957	Alfred Hitchcock Presents	Sam Saunders	Season 2 Episode 36: "Father and Son"
1957	5 Steps to Danger	Kirk	
1957	The Young Stranger	Detective	
1957	Oh, Men! Oh, Women!	Steward	Uncredited
1957	Public Pigeon No. 1	Brady	Uncredited
1959	Alfred Hitchcock Presents	Museum Guard	Season 4 Episode 27: "The Waxwork"
1959	The Wreck of the Mary Deare	Yules, Quartermaster on Mary Deare	
1960	Alfred Hitchcock Presents	x	Season 6 Episode 5: "The Five-Forty-Eight"
1966	The Wild Wild West	West's butler/valet	3 Episodes"
1968	Star!	Writ Server	Uncredited
