= Manitoba Historical Society =

History journal

The Manitoba Historical Society is a historical society in the province of Manitoba, Canada. It was created in 1879 by an Act of the Legislature of Manitoba, and describes itself as "the oldest organization in western Canada devoted to the promotion of public interest in, and preservation of, the region’s historical resources". The society publishes a journal called Prairie History and presents an annual literary award called the Margaret McWilliams Award. The current Board Chair of the society is Lawrence Prout The Acting Executive Director is Dr. Gordon Goldsborough.

== Notable people ==
- William Kennedy, a founder
- H. Clare Pentland (President from 1963-65)
