= Maurice Mierau =

American-Canadian writer

- Born: Maurice Mierau; Bloomington, Indiana, USA
- Citizenship: American, Canadian
- Education: MA in English from U of M
- Occupations: poet, writer, editor
- Spouse: Married
- Writing career
- Period: 2002 to present
- Genres: Poetry, Non-Fiction
- Notable works: Ending With Music, Memoir of a Living Disease, Fear Not
- Notable awards: The John Hirsch Award for Most Promising Manitoba Writer, Margaret McWilliams Award, ReLit Award

Maurice Mierau (born January 22, 1962) is an American-Canadian writer of non-fiction and poetry. Born in Bloomington, Indiana, Mierau grew up in Nigeria, Manitoba, Jamaica, Kansas and Saskatchewan and has a Mennonite background. Mierau currently lives with his family in Winnipeg, Manitoba, and was president of the League of Canadian Poets from 2006 to 2008. Mierau holds an MA in English Literature from the University of Manitoba.

== Literary career ==
Mierau began writing informally at the age of nine as a way to express himself. With inspiration from the Bible and music, he has published two poetry books: Fear Not in 2008 and Ending with Music in 2002. In 2005 he was asked by The Manitoba Lung Association to write Memoir of a Living Disease for their tuberculosis treatment program. In 1988-90 Maurice was review editor for Prairie Fire Magazine and in 1990 was the founding editor of Prairie Book World, currently known as, Prairie Books Now. From 2002 to 2006 Mierau taught technical writing in the Business Computing Department at the University of Winnipeg. From the years 2005-2008 he worked as a poet and teacher in "The Artists in the Schools" program and had residencies in four Winnipeg high schools. He was a poetry editor for Geez (magazine) from 2007 to 2010 and also co-editor for Contemporary Verse 2 through the same years. In 2008 Maurice served as a mentor for an emerging poet in the "Manitoba Writer's Guild" mentor-ship program and again in 2011. From 2009 to 2010 he was a writer in residence at the Winnipeg Public Library. He presently works as a poetry co-editor for CV2 magazine, as the editor of the online literary magazine The Winnipeg Review, and as an associate editor for Enfield & Wizenty.

== Writing style ==
In Mierau's first book of poetry, Ending with Music, he uses a conventional poetic form which is not unique other than in content and style. The poems in Ending with Music tell the stories of events and people. The poetry, though dealing with generally conventional subject matter, has a slight stylistic twist to it. The poems have a unique perspective which at first might not be recognized and which alter the reader's perceptions of the stories in subtle ways. These poems are at times darkly humorous, heart wrenching, or illuminating and fulfilling. Mierau's most radical work is Fear Not, his second book of poetry. This book takes the form of many poems which are all connected by form. The book is written as if it is a collection of biblical psalms; however the subject matter and literary style could not be less biblical. Mierau uses techniques such as irony and juxtaposition to intensify the messages and experience of his writing. The juxtaposition is one of form and style against content. Mierau's poems are well crafted and lyrical and unfailingly mirror the ancient biblical form of the psalm, yet they are dealing with the harsh realities of a modern world and are unrelentingly accurate in describing the human experience.

== Works ==
=== Poetry ===
==== Ending With Music (2002) ====
Ending With Music, Maurice Mierau's first book, was published by Brick Books in 2002. The book is a collection of poems that deal with themes of violence, suicide, martyrdom, music, and pop culture. These themes are explored through the lens of Anabaptist and Mennonite history, as framed by the book Martyr's Mirror. In other poems he looks at the plight of Mennonite farmers in Saskatchewan during the 1930s and his own family's experience of fleeing from Ukraine near the end of World War 2.

Other poems in the book examine historical figures like Louis Armstrong and Lenny Breau, highlighting the immortalizing effect of artistic expression.

The style is influenced by some writers, particularly Patrick Friesen and Robert Kroetsch. In Ending With Music the poetic style tends to be unadorned, while there is some use of sonnets and rhyming schemes.

==== Fear Not (2008) ====
Fear Not, published by Turnstone Press in 2008, is a collection of poems that parody the self-help topics in the Gideon Bible. The poems intermingle biblical passages with contemporary self-help and advertising language. Poems are based upon the directory at the end of the Gideon Bible that suggests readings based on the readers state of mind, such as "Tempted to Lie". Although based on the Gideon Bible the subject matter of the poems often diverge to reference pop culture, the holocaust and his family. Formally, this book represents a significant stylistic departure from his first book,Ending with Music. The poems are set up in two columns, like the King James Bible but use traditional formal shapes of English poetry (sonnet, sestina, nonce form).

=== Non-fiction ===
==== Memoir of a Living Disease (2005) ====
Memoir of a Living Disease, published by Great Plains Publication in 2005, is a non-fiction history of the treatment and current impact of tuberculosis in the world, focusing on Manitoba. The book deals with a First Nations community that had one of the highest rates of tuberculosis infection in Canada, a result of poverty and sub-standard housing. The book includes interviews with about 60 front-line tuberculosis researchers and medical practitioners.

The book was commissioned by the Manitoban chapter of the Canadian Lung Association for their tuberculosis treatment program.

== Awards and nominations ==
- 2003: Ending With Music is nominated for the Eileen McTavish Sykes Award for Best First Book
- 2003: The John Hirsch Award for Most Promising Manitoba Writer
- 2006: Winner of a Margaret McWilliams Award from the Manitoba Historical Society for Memoir of a Living Disease
- 2009: Winner of the ReLit Award for Poetry for Fear Not
- 2009: Nominated for the McNally Robinson Book of the Year Award for Fear Not.
- 2009: Nominated for the Aqua Books Lansdowne Prize for Poetry.
