= Happy as the Grass Was Green =

- Directed by: Charles Davis
- Screenplay by: Charles Davis
- Story by: Charles Davis, based on a story of Merle Good
- Starring: Graham Beckel; Pat Hingle; Geraldine Page
- Production company: Burt Martin Associates Production
- Release date: December 1973
- Running time: 105 minutes
- Country: United States
- Language: English

Happy as the Grass Was Green, later renamed Hazel's People, is a 1973 American drama film directed by Charles Davis and starring Geraldine Page, Pat Hingle and Graham Beckel. The film is one of the few Mennonite related films ever made.

Most of the cast other than the aforementioned consists of genuine Pennsylvanian Mennonites. The film is based on a novel by Merle Good. For many years, the film was presented nightly at the "People's Place" in Intercourse, Pennsylvania. The Global Anabaptist Mennonite Encyclopedia Online states: "The two films Amish Grace and Happy as the Grass was Green have significant insider Mennonite contributions and come closest to presenting a valid image of Amish and Mennonites".

The original title of the film is taken from the poem Fern Hill of Dylan Thomas.

== Plot ==
A Mennonite family's son is shot to death by police at an unnamed New York university while protesting the Vietnam War. His brother and another college student, Eric Mills, portrayed by Graham Beckel, go to Lancaster County, Pennsylvania, stay on the family farm and attend his funeral. Once Mills arrives in the small town, he connects with the simple lifestyle there and discovers the Christian faith of the Mennonites. In the end, he decides to go back to the "world" instead of joining the small, religious community, in order to work on improving injustice, that now he could approach in a new way.
