= Armin Wiebe =

Canadian writer

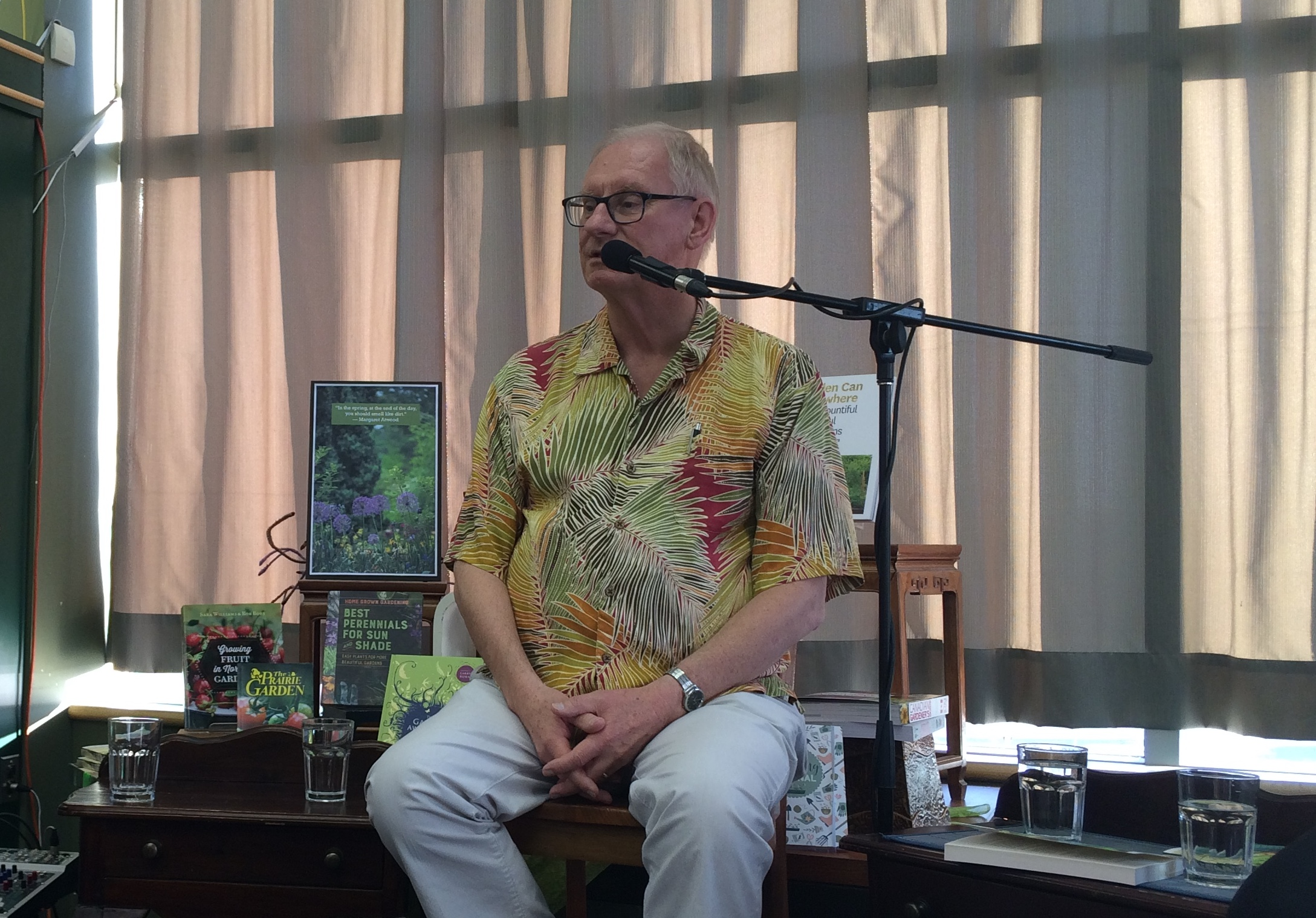
- Born: June 17, 1948 (age 78); Altona, Manitoba
- Education: University of Manitoba; University of Winnipeg
- Occupations: novelist, playwright
- Writing career
- Period: 1980s–present
- Notable works: The Salvation of Yasch Siemens, Tatsea
- Website: arminwiebe.ca

Armin Wiebe (born 17 June 1948) is a Canadian writer from Winnipeg, Manitoba, best known for his humorous novels about Mennonites. Wiebe is regarded as one of the pioneers of humorous Mennonite writing in English and is known for his incorporation of Plautdietsch words within his English texts.

== Career ==
Beginning with The Salvation of Yasch Siemens, which was shortlisted for the Stephen Leacock Award for Humour in 1984, Wiebe has published several humorous novels about Mennonites. He followed up this book with Murder in Gutenthal and The Second Coming of Yeeat Shpanst, all published by Turnstone Press.

His novel Tatsea is a work of historic fiction, which diverges significantly from his Mennonite writing, and depicts the Dogrib people of the Canadian Subarctic in the 1700s.

Wiebe has also written plays and short stories about Mennonites and has published a collection of short stories entitled "Armin's Shorts'. His stage play The Moonlight Sonata of Beethoven Blatz premiered to sold-out houses at Theatre Projects Manitoba in April 2011. In 2024, his play The Recipe debuted at the Manitoba Theatre Centre.

== Personal ==
Wiebe is of Russian Mennonite descent and was born Altona, Manitoba in 1948. He lives in Winnipeg and holds degrees from the University of Manitoba and the University of Winnipeg and taught creative writing at Red River College in Winnipeg for twelve years.

== Awards and honours ==
=== Literary awards ===
- 2004: McNally Robinson Book of the Year Award and Margaret Laurence Award for Fiction for Tatsea.

=== Shortlists and other recognition ===
- 1985: Shortlisted for the Stephen Leacock Memorial Medal for Humour for The Salvation of Yasch Siemens.
- 2019: Honourable mention in the Herman Voaden National Playwriting Competition for Wine and Little Breads.

== Works ==
=== Novels ===
- 1984: The Salvation of Yasch Siemens.
- 1991: Murder in Gutenthal.
- 1995: The Second Coming of Yeeat Shpanst.
- 2003: Tatsea.
- 2017: Grandmother, Laughing.

=== Short story collections ===
- 2015: Armin's Shorts.

=== Plays ===
- 2011: The Moonlight Sonata of Beethoven Blatz.
- 2025: The Recipe; first performed in 2024.

=== Special editions ===
- 2019: The Salvation of Yasch Siemens, 35th-anniversary Turnstone Selects edition.
