= Sally Ito =

Canadian writer

- Born: 1964 (age 61–62); Taber, Alberta, Canada
- Occupations: writer, professor
- Writing career
- Period: 1990s–present

Sally Ito (born 1964) is a Canadian writer, translator, and artist from Winnipeg, Manitoba.

== Career ==
Ito was born in 1964 in Taber, Alberta. She grew up in Edmonton and began writing poetry as a teenager. She currently teaches creative writing at Canadian Mennonite University in Winnipeg. Ito is the author of four books of poetry, Frogs in the Rain Barrel (1996), Season of Mercy (1999), Alert to Glory (2011), and Heart's Hydrography (2022). She has also published a collection of short stories called Floating Shore in 1998. She is perhaps best known for her 2018 memoir The Emperor's Orphans about the 4,000 Japanese Canadians who were repatriated to Japan during World War II.
