= Margaret McWilliams Award =

The Margaret McWilliams Awards are an annual literary award in Manitoba, Canada presented by the Manitoba Historical Society. The society awards prizes in the categories of Scholarly History Book, Popular History Book, and Local History Book. Inaugurated in 1955, the award is among the oldest literary prizes in Canada and named after historian and author Margaret Stovel McWilliams. Past winners include Sarah Klassen, James Urry, Royden Loewen, Maurice Mierau, Roland Penner, Carol Matas and many others.
