= Rachel Yoder =

American writer

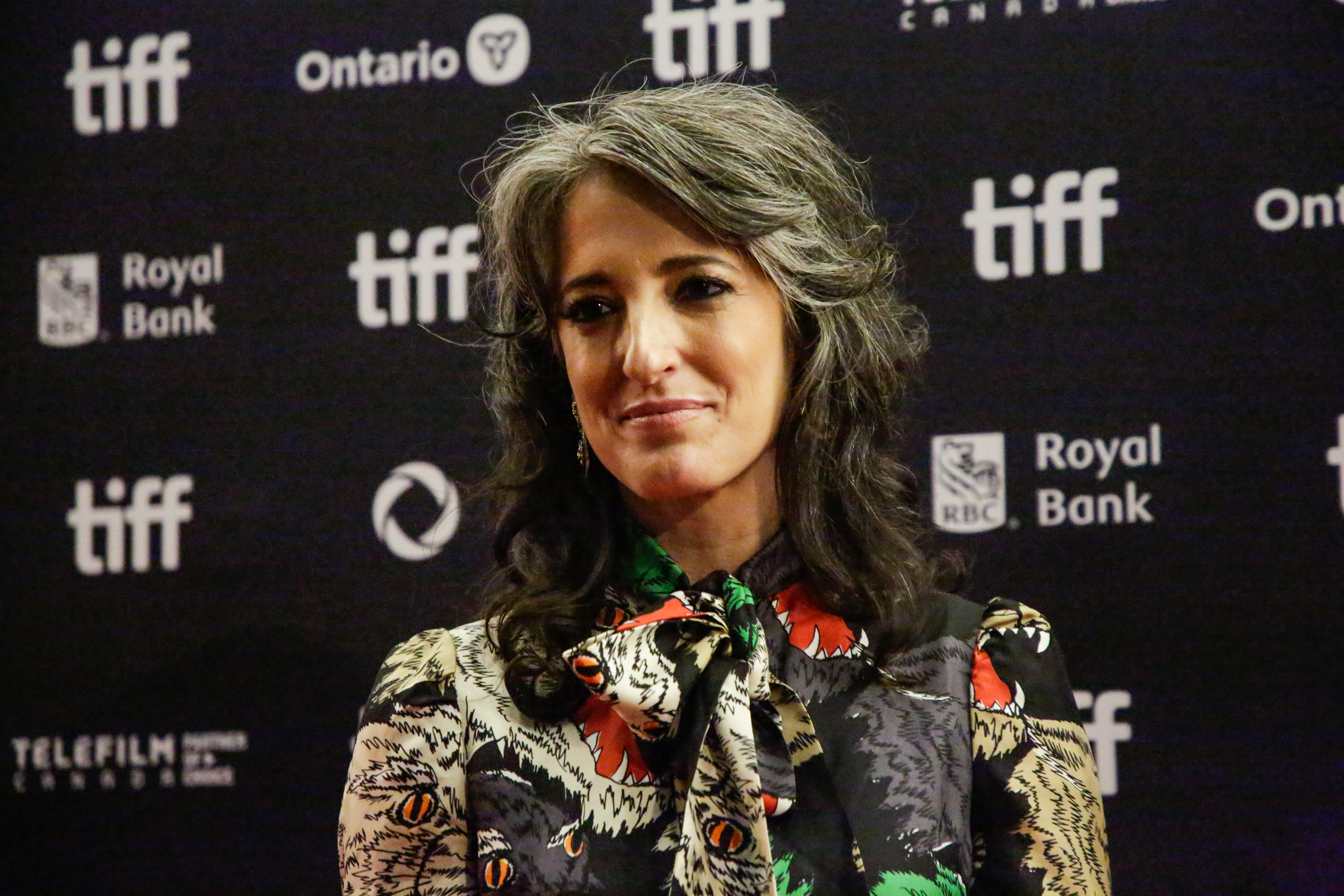
- Education: University of Arizona (MFA); University of Iowa (MFA)
- Occupation: Novelist
- Writing career
- Period: 2020s–present
- Notable work: Nightbitch
- Website: www.racheljyoder.com

Rachel Yoder is an American writer from Iowa City, Iowa, best known for her novel Nightbitch.

== Life and career ==
Yoder grew up in an intentional Mennonite community in the Appalachian foothills of eastern Ohio, before attending the University of Iowa Nonfiction Writing Program and earning an MFA from the University of Arizona. She earned an undergraduate degree from Georgetown University. She is the founder of draft: the journal of process.

In 2021, she released her debut novel Nightbitch, which was a "best book of the year" in Esquire and Vulture and a finalist for the PEN/Hemingway Award for Debut Novel, among other awards. A 2024 film based on the book starred Amy Adams, whose performance received a Golden Globe nomination for "Best Performance by a Female Actor in a Motion Picture, Musical or Comedy".

Yoder is currently Assistant Professor of Screenwriting and Cinema Arts at the University of Iowa.

Yoder suffers from chronic pain due to an immune disorder and has published a number of essays about her experience with this pain and the psychological ramifications it has had on her life.
