= The Daily Bonnet =

Mennonite satire website

The Unger Review
- Website type: Satirical website
- Available in: English
- Headquarters: Steinbach, Manitoba
- Website: ungerreview.com
- Launched: 2016
- Current status: Online

The Daily Bonnet is a satirical Mennonite website, known as The Unger Review as of 2023. It was created by Andrew Unger and launched in May 2016. It features news stories and editorials, with the structure of conventional newspapers, but whose content is contorted to make humorous commentary on Mennonite and Anabaptist issues.

The Daily Bonnet has been cited in the Manitoba Legislature and used as an example of Mennonite humour in the Canadian House of Commons in support of a bill to create a Mennonite Heritage Week. A number of viral posts including "Mennonite Biker Gangs Clash with Hells Angels at Sturgis" and "Canada Pays Off Entire Federal Debt One Day After Marijuana Legalization" were fact-checked and listed as "satire" by Snopes and Politifact. The site has been visited by millions of people every year since its inception.

In 2021, a collection of Unger's Daily Bonnet articles called The Best of the Bonnet was released by Turnstone Press.

In 2023, Unger renamed the website The Unger Review, with The Daily Bonnet becoming a section of that website.

== See also ==
- List of satirical news websites
- Mennonite literature
