= Rudy Wiebe =

Canadian author and academic

Rudy Wiebe OC
- Born: 4 October 1934 (age 92); Fairholme, Saskatchewan, Canada
- Education: University of Alberta; University of Tübingen; Canadian Mennonite University
- Occupations: Author, professor
- Spouse: Tena Isaak (m. 1958)
- Writing career
- Genres: fiction, non-fiction

Signature
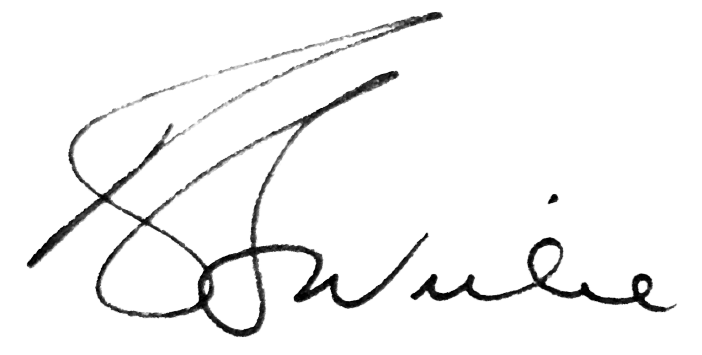

Rudy Henry Wiebe OC (born 4 October 1934) is a Canadian author and professor emeritus in the department of English at the University of Alberta since 1992. Rudy Wiebe was made an Officer of the Order of Canada in the year 2000.

== Early life ==
Wiebe was born at Speedwell, near Fairholme, Saskatchewan, in what would later become his family's chicken barn. For thirteen years he lived in an isolated community of about 250 people, as part of the last generation of homesteaders to settle the Canadian west. He did not speak English until age six since Mennonites at that time customarily spoke Low German at home and standard German in church. He attended the small school three miles from his farm and the Speedwell Mennonite Brethren Church. In 1947, he moved with his family to Coaldale, Alberta.

Wiebe earned a Bachelor of Arts from the University of Alberta in 1956. In 1957–1958, he studied literature and theology at the University of Tübingen in West Germany with support from a Rotary International fellowship.

He returned to the University of Alberta and completed a Master of Arts in creative writing in 1960. His master's thesis developed into his first novel, Peace Shall Destroy Many (1962).

Wiebe also earned a Bachelor of Theology from Mennonite Brethren Bible College in Winnipeg, one of the institutions that later formed Canadian Mennonite University. He later studied creative writing at the University of Iowa.

== Career ==
While in Winnipeg, he worked as the editor of the Mennonite Brethren Herald, a position he was asked to leave after the publication of his controversial debut novel Peace Shall Destroy Many (1962), the book that heralded a wave of Mennonite literature in the decades that followed.

Wiebe taught at Goshen College in Goshen, Indiana from 1963 to 1967, and taught at the University of Alberta in Edmonton for many decades after that.

In addition to Peace Shall Destroy Many, Wiebe's novels include First and Vital Candle (1966), The Blue Mountains of China (1970), The Temptations of Big Bear (1973), The Scorched-wood People (1977), The Mad Trapper (1980), My Lovely Enemy (1983), A Discovery of Strangers (1994), Sweeter Than All the World (2001), and Come Back (2014). He has also published collections of short stories, essays, and children's books. In 2006 he published a volume of memoirs about his childhood, entitled Of This Earth: A Mennonite Boyhood in the Boreal Forest. His work has explored the traditions and struggles of people in the Prairie provinces, both settlers, often Mennonite, and First Nations people.

Wiebe won the Governor General's Award for Fiction twice, for The Temptations of Big Bear (1973) and A Discovery of Strangers (1994). Thomas King says of The Temptations of Big Bear that "Wiebe captures the pathos and the emotion of Native people at a certain point in their history and he does it well ... Wiebe points out to us that Canada has not come to terms with Native peoples, that there is unfinished business to attend to." Wiebe was awarded the Royal Society of Canada's Lorne Pierce Medal in 1986. In 2000 he was made an Officer of the Order of Canada. In 2003 Wiebe was a member of the jury for the Giller Prize. In 2023 Guernica Editions published, Rudy Wiebe: Essays on His Works edited by Bianca Lakoseljac which includes 20 articles devoted to Wiebe.

== Personal life ==
In 1958, he married Tena Isaak, with whom he had three children.

== Awards ==
- 1973 Governor General's Award for Fiction for The Temptations of Big Bear
- 1994 Governor General's Award for Fiction for A Discovery of Strangers
- 2007 Charles Taylor Prize for Of This Earth: A Mennonite Boyhood in the Boreal Forest
- 2009 Honorary Doctor of Letters from the University of Alberta

== Works ==
=== Novels ===
- Peace Shall Destroy Many (1962).
- First and Vital Candle (1966).
- The Blue Mountains of China (1970).
- The Temptations of Big Bear (1973).
- The Scorched-Wood People (1977).
- The Mad Trapper (1980).
- My Lovely Enemy (1983).
- A Discovery of Strangers (1994).
- Sweeter Than All the World (2001).
- Come Back (2014).

=== Short story collections ===
- Where Is the Voice Coming From? (1974).
- Alberta: A Celebration (1979), with photographs by Harry Savage, edited by Tom Radford.
- The Angel of the Tar Sands and Other Stories (1982).
- River of Stone: Fictions and Memories (1995).
- Rudy Wiebe: Collected Stories, 1955–2010 (2010).

=== Non-fiction ===
- War in the West: Voices of the 1885 Rebellion (1985), compiled with Bob Beal.
- Playing Dead: A Contemplation Concerning the Arctic (1989), a collection of essays.
- Stolen Life: The Journey of a Cree Woman (1998), co-written with Yvonne Johnson.
- Of This Earth: A Mennonite Boyhood in the Boreal Forest (2006), a memoir.
- Extraordinary Canadians: Big Bear (2008), a biography.

=== Plays ===
- Far as the Eye Can See (1977), with Theatre Passe Muraille.

=== Children's books ===
- Chinook Christmas (1993), illustrated by David Moore.
- Hidden Buffalo (2003), illustrated by Michael Lonechild.
