= Nightbitch =

2021 novel by Rachel Yoder

- First edition cover
- Author: Rachel Yoder
- Language: English
- Publisher: Doubleday
- Publication date: July 20, 2021
- Publication place: United States
- Pages: 256
- ISBN: 9780385546812

Nightbitch is a 2021 novel by American writer Rachel Yoder. The book is a magical realism-style story of a stay-at-home mom who sometimes transforms into a dog.

== Premise ==
A woman gives up her career and dreams as a budding artist to become a stay-at-home mother. Her husband travels on all weekdays, leaving her as the sole caretaker of her child. Approximately 18 months into her time as a stay-at-home mother, she begins to undergo strange phenomena, such as craving meat and finding black fur on her body. She soon starts to transform into a dog at night.

== Writing and composition ==
Yoder had not written for two years when she began writing Nightbitch. She wrote it in part due to the anger she felt after becoming a mother and the resultant changes to her personal and professional life. She was further inspired by a passage in Jenny Offill's novel Dept. of Speculation. Yoder wrote the novel free of concerns about its strangeness, as she wrote it "for herself", though she did have concerns that the book's premise would not provide enough substance for a book of the length she wanted to write.

== Critical reception ==
In a review for The Seattle Times, Jordan Snowden praised the novel as "[...] a stunning modern feminist fable that shouldn’t be missed". In her review of the book for The Guardian, Lara Feigel referred it as "an important contribution to the engagement with motherhood that rightly dominates contemporary feminism". Writing for The Washington Post, Bethanne Patrick describes how "Rachel Yoder’s debut novel, 'Nightbitch,' may feel as if the author stuck her hand into your brain and rummaged around. Yoder has a powerful understanding of the alienation that can set in for stay-at-home mothers and others." In her review for The New Yorker, Hillary Kelly wrote, "The two predominant strains of maternal commentary in the twenty-first century can be summarized as 'Mothers cannot possibly do all that is asked of them' and 'Mothers are capable of anything.' Each affirms the other: mothers simultaneously cannot live up to both maxims, and they have little choice but to try...Yoder believes both, and neither, and her novel happily occupies a floating realm between them." Slate's Rebecca Onion had mixed feelings about the novel, noting "There are parts of the book that seem to be trying too hard—I could do without the subplot where the narrator reads a mysterious book about magical women and sends long letters to its author. But as a meditation on the radical evolution parenthood demands, it’s perfect."

== Film adaptation ==
A film adaptation starring Amy Adams premiered at the 2024 Toronto International Film Festival. Annapurna Pictures and Searchlight Pictures produced with Marielle Heller as writer-director.
