= Arnold Dyck =

Russian-Canadian Mennonite writer

Arnold (Abram Bernhard) Dyck (January 19, 1889 – July 10, 1970) was a Russian Mennonite writer born in Hochfeld, Ukraine. He immigrated to Canada in 1923, residing in Steinbach, Manitoba, where he purchased and edited the Steinbach Post. He is best known for his humorous 'Koop enn Bua' books, and his autobiographical novel 'Verloren in der Steppe (Lost in the Steppe)'. He also wrote Low German plays, history, and short stories.

Dyck's books are among the first publications in the Mennonite dialect of Plautdietsch. He is an important figure in Mennonite literature, as his works are regarded as influential not only in establishing and recording Mennonite humour, but as establishing Plautdietsch as a written language.

In later years Dyck lived in Winnipeg, before moving to Germany, where he died in Darlaten in 1970.

Plautdietsche-Freunde (Low German Friends), an organization in Germany, named a prize in his honour called the Arnold Dyck Prize awarded to people who have contributed to the Plautdietsch language.
