= Plautdietsch =

Dialect of Low German

- Plautdiitsch; Mennonite Low German
- Plautdietsch
- Native to: Vistula delta region, Poland
- Region: Argentina, Belize, Bolivia, Brazil, Canada, Germany, Kazakhstan, Mexico, Paraguay, Peru, United States, Uruguay
- Native speakers: 450,000 (2007)
- Language family: Indo-European: Germanic; West Germanic; North Sea Germanic; Low German; Northern or Eastern?; Low Prussian?; Plautdietsch
- Early forms: Old Saxon: Middle Low German; Modern Low German

Official status
- Recognised minority language in: Mexico (100,000+)

Language codes
- ISO 639-3: pdt
- Glottolog: plau1238
- Plautdietsch is classified as Definitely Endangered by the UNESCO Atlas of the World's Languages in Danger (2010)

Plautdietsch (pronounced [ˈplaʊt.ditʃ]) or Mennonite Low German is a Low Prussian dialect of East Low German with Dutch influence that developed in the 16th and 17th centuries in the Vistula delta area of Royal Prussia. The word Plautdietsch translates to "flat (or low) German" (referring to the plains of northern Germany). In other Low German dialects, the word for Low German is usually realised as Plattdütsch/Plattdüütsch [ˈplatdyːtʃ] or Plattdüütsk [ˈplatdyːtsk], – very often also as Plattdeutsch – but the spelling Plautdietsch is used to refer specifically to the Vistula variant of the language.

Plautdietsch was a Low German dialect like others until it was taken by Mennonite settlers to the southwest of the Russian Empire starting in 1789. From there it evolved and subsequent waves of migration brought it to North America, starting in 1873.

Plautdietsch is spoken by about 400,000 Russian Mennonites, most notably in the Americas: Canada (notably Manitoba, Saskatchewan, and Ontario), Mexico, Bolivia, Paraguay, Belize, Brazil, Argentina (notably La Pampa and Santiago del Estero), Peru, Uruguay and the United States (notably Kansas, Oklahoma, and Texas).

Today, Plautdietsch is spoken in two major dialects that trace their division to what is now Ukraine. These two dialects are split between Chortitza Colony and Molotschna. Today, many younger Russian Mennonites in Canada and the United States speak only English.

In 2007, Mexican filmmaker Carlos Reygadas directed the film Stellet Licht (Silent Light), set in a Mennonite community in Chihuahua, Mexico. Most of the film's dialogue is in Plautdietsch, which some of the actors had to learn phonetically. Other parts were played by people of the local community.

== Migration history ==
Plautdietsch speakers today are mostly the descendants of Mennonites who fled in the 16th century to escape persecution and resettled in the Vistula delta in present-day Poland. These refugees were Frisians, Saxons from East Frisia, people from Flanders, and Central Europeans. They settled in West Prussia mostly in the three local areas of Nehrung (on the Baltic Sea), Werder (islands in the Vistula delta) and Niederung (south of the Werder), where they adopted the respective local Low German dialect as their everyday language. As Mennonites they kept their own (primarily Dutch and Low German) identity, using Standard Dutch as the language of the church well into the 18th century. As a written language, they took up High German.

At the time of their migration to the Russian Empire, their spoken language resembled the dialects of the region with only a few Dutch elements. Their East Low German dialect is still classified as Low Prussian. Most Russian Mennonites trace their genealogical roots mostly to the Low Countries.

Beginning in the late 18th century, the expanding Russian Empire invited Germans and many from the Kingdom of Prussia, including many Mennonites, to create new colonies north of the Black Sea in an area that Russia had recently acquired in one of the Russo-Turkish Wars. This is now part of Ukraine as well as other countries. Beginning in 1873, many Plautdietsch-speaking Mennonites migrated from the Russian Empire to the United States and Canada.

In 1922, Plautdietsch-speaking Mennonites from Canada started to settle in Mexico, and in 1927 in Paraguay. In the 1930s, Mennonites emigrated mainly from Soviet Ukraine directly to Brazil. The first Mennonite settlement in Bolivia was founded in 1957 by Plautdietsch-speaking Mennonites from Paraguay. Soon, conservative Plautdietsch-speaking Mennonites from Canada, Mexico, and Belize also relocated to Bolivia, settling together. In 1986/7, a settlement was founded in Argentina by Plautdietsch-speaking Mennonites from other Latin American countries. Plautdietsch-speaking Mennonites have also recently begun colonies in the jungle of Peru.

== Speaker population and language maintenance ==
Approximate distribution of native speakers of German or a German variety outside Europe (according to Ethnologue 2016 unless referenced otherwise) Numbers of speakers should not be summed up per country, as they most likely overlap considerably. Table includes varieties with disputed statuses as separate language.
	Standard German	Hunsrik/Hunsrückisch	Low German & Plautdietsch	Pennsylvania Dutch	Hutterite
Argentina	400,000	—N/a	4,000	—N/a	—N/a
Australia	79,000	—N/a	—N/a	—N/a	—N/a
Belize	—N/a	—N/a	9,360	—N/a	—N/a
Bolivia	160,000	—N/a	60,000	—N/a	—N/a
Brazil	1,500,000	3,000,000	8,000	—N/a	—N/a
Canada	430,000	—N/a	80,000	15,000	23,200
Chile	35,000	—N/a	—N/a	—N/a	—N/a
Ireland	40,000	—N/a	—N/a	—N/a	—N/a
Israel	200,000	—N/a	—N/a	—N/a	—N/a
Kazakhstan	30,400	—N/a	100,000	—N/a	—N/a
Mexico	—N/a	—N/a	40,000	—N/a	—N/a
Namibia	22,500	—N/a	—N/a	—N/a	—N/a
New Zealand	36,000	—N/a	—N/a	—N/a	—N/a
Paraguay	166,000	—N/a	40,000	—N/a	—N/a
Peru	2,000	—N/a	5,000	—N/a	—N/a
Russia	—N/a	—N/a	—N/a	—N/a	—N/a
South Africa	12,000	—N/a	—N/a	—N/a	—N/a
Uruguay	28,000	—N/a	2,000	—N/a	—N/a
United Kingdom	55,000	—N/a	—N/a	—N/a	—N/a
United States	1,104,354	—N/a	12,000	118,000	10,800
Sum	4,599,392	3,000,000	362,360	133,000	34,000

Plautdietsch-speaking communities in Latin America have mostly maintained their language, while also learning Standard German and local languages. In North America, many Mennonites have adopted English as their common language. In Germany, many Mennonites have shifted to Standard German, with only the most conservative fraction maintaining use of the Plautdietsch dialect.

== Status ==
Plautdietsch is primarily a spoken language and does not have an official orthography. But there have been attempts to create a written form of the language. One of the main difficulties facing is the variation in pronunciation among speech communities. Another hindrance to the unification of the language is that Plautdietsch-speaking people are not found in one geographical region, being spread across North America (Canada, the United States, Mexico), Central America, and South America. Noteworthy attempts at an orthography include those by Fast (1982), Reimer (1982), Reimer et al. (1983), Epp (1996), Loewen (1996, 1998), and Heinrichs et al. (2001). Despite the absence of an official orthography, there are quite a few written texts in the Plautdietsch language. A significant example is the Bible, whose New Testament was published in 1987 and complete version in 2005. It shares grammatical and lexical similarities with other varieties of Low German, and is largely intelligible to other Low German speakers after some acquaintance. On the other hand, it has several developments and sound shifts not found in any other Low German dialect.

== Varieties ==
Regional differences of the language have developed. This is common in spoken languages that have historically lacked a consistent writing system, and have been carried to territories where other languages prevail. Major differences seem to have originated in the beginning of the 19th century in the two major Mennonite settlements in Ekaterinoslav, also known as Novorossiya, or New Russia, which lies in modern-day Ukraine. The colonies were Chortitza (Old Colony) and Molotschna (New Colony), as noted above.

There was a third variety spoken by Groningen Old Flemish Mennonites in Waldheim, Gnadenfeld, and Alexanderwohl, which traced its origin from Przechovka. From Przechovka some moved to Brenkenhoffswalde and Franztal, in what is today Poland, where they used to live until 1945. Alexanderwohl Mennonite Church is a Low German Mennonite Church, in Goessel, Kansas, US.

Some of the major differences between the two (major) varieties are:

	Old or Chortitza Colony dialect	New or Molotschna Colony dialect	Contemporary other Northern Low German	Standard High German	Meaning of word
verbs and other -en endings	räden	räde	reden	reden	to speak, to talk
oa diphthong	Froag [freaɣ]	Froag [froaɣ]	Fraag	Frage	question
u/y sound	Hus/Hüs [hys]	Hus [hus]	Huus	Haus	house
s/ts sound	Zol (Ssol) [sol]	Zol (Tsol) [tsol]	Tahl/Tall	Zahl	number (compare "tale")

A few other differences sometimes related to this issue are the exact pronunciation of the IPA c sound and words as jenau/jeneiw. According to some studies, those might be due to the level of education of the speaker, as well as the influence of Russian and standard German.

The distinctive features of Chortitza-Plautdietsch as opposed to Molotschna-Plautdietsch include:

Feature	Chortitza-Plautdietsch	Molotschna-Plautdietsch
high rounded vowel - long /u/ realised as	<ü> [y]	<u> [ʉ]
lexical allophones	<eiw> [ɛɪv]	<au> [au]
low opening diphthong - <oa> diphthong	[ɛɐ]	[ɔɐ]
palatal plosives	<kj>/<gj>	<tj>/<dj>
syllabic nasal - verbal infinitives and plural suffixes ending in	<–en> [n̩]	<–e> [ə]

Some Plautdietsch speakers might speak a mixture of both dialects. For instance, those who trace their origin to the Bergthal Colony in New Russia—a daughter colony of the Old Colony—show all the phonetic distinction of the Old Colony version, but drop the final -n as the Molotschna speakers do.

== Comparison with related languages ==
Plautdietsch has a Low German base, and as such, it does not show the effects of the High German consonant shift. This distinguished the High German dialects from the Low German dialects and all other Germanic languages. The basic distinctions between High German and Low German are:

=== Effects of the High German consonant shift ===
	Standard High German	Northern Low German	Plautdietsch	Pennsylvania German	Yiddish	Dutch	English
High German pf, f = Low German p	Pfeife	Piep	Piep	Peif	פֿערד ferd, רער rer, ליולקע lyulke	pijp	pipe
High German pf, f = Low German p	Apfel	Appel	Aupel	Appel	עפּל epl	appel	apple
High German z, s, ss, ß = Low German t	Zunge	Tung	Tung	Zung	צונג tsung	tong	tongue
High German z, s, ss, ß = Low German t	was	wat	waut	was	וואָס vos	wat	what
High German z, s, ss, ß = Low German t	essen	eten	äte(n)	esse	עסן esn	eten	to eat
High German z, s, ss, ß = Low German t	Fuß	Foot	Foot	Fuus	פֿוס fus	voet	foot
High German ch = Low German k	machen	maken	moake(n)	mache	מאַכן makhn	maken	to make
High German t = Low German d	tun	doon	doone(n)	duh	טון tun	doen	to do
High German t = Low German d	Teil	Deel	Deel	Deel	טײל teyl	deel	part (compare "dole", "deal")
High German b = Low German w, v, f	Leben	Leven	Läwe(n)	Leewe	לעבן lebn, חיים khaym	leven	life
High German b = Low German w, v, f	Korb	Korf	Korf	Karb	קאָרב korb, קויש koysh	korf	basket (compare "corf")
English ⟨th⟩ = other Germanic languages d	danken	danken	danke(n)	danke	דאַנקען danken	danken	to thank

Like Dutch, Frisian and Low German, Plautdietsch only shows the mutation of ⟨th⟩ into ⟨d⟩.

=== Vowel shifts in various Germanic languages ===
Original vowel sound	Standard High German	Northern Low German	Plautdietsch	Pennsylvania German	Yiddish	Dutch	English
iː	Wein [vaɪn]	Wien [viːn]	Wien [viːn]	Wei [vaɪ]	װײַן vayn [vaɪn]	wijn [ʋɛin]	wine [waɪn]
yː	Feuer [fɔʏɐ]	Füür [fyːɐ]	Fia [fiːɐ]	Feier [faɪɐ]	פֿײַער fayer [fajɜr]	vuur [vyːr]	fire [faɪɚ]
uː	Haus [haʊ̯s]	Huus [huːs]	Hus [huːs] (Mol), [hyːs] (OCol)	Haus [haʊs]	הויז hoyz/hauz [hɔɪz]/[haʊz]	huis [ɦœʏ̯s]	house [haʊs]

As shown, while Dutch, English and German have experienced similar vowel shifts, Plautdietsch has only merged the old Germanic /yː/ sound with /iː/, while long /uː/ is retained in the Molotschna dialect. The Old Colony variety has fronted it to the now vacant /yː/.

=== Unique developments ===
Not only has Plautdietsch undergone vowel shift, various dialects of Plautdietsch have also had their own shifts.

==== Vowel lowering ====
	Standard High German	Northern Low German	Plautdietsch	Pennsylvania German	Yiddish	Dutch	English
/ɪ/ to /ɛ/	Fisch, dünn	Fisch, dünn	Fesch, denn	Fisch, dinn	פֿיש, דין fish, din	vis, dun	fish, thin
/ɛ/ to /a/	helfen, rennen	hölpen, rennen	halpe(n), rane(n)	helfe, schpringe (from springen)	העלפֿן, לױפֿן helfn, loyfn (from laufen)	helpen, rennen	to help, to run
/ʊ/ to /ɔ/^{1}	Luft, Brust	Luft, Borst	Loft, Brost	Luft, Bruscht	לופֿט, ברוסט luft, brust	lucht, borst	air (Latinate root)/archaic loft, breast
/aː/ to /au/	Mann, Hand	Mann, Hand	Maun, Haunt	Mann, Hand	מאַן, האַנט man, hant	man, hand	man, hand

1. This shift is still active, as some speakers {including a few from Hague} still retain the older pronunciation.

==== Vowel unrounding ====
	Standard High German	Northern Low German	Plautdietsch	Pennsylvania German	Yiddish	Dutch	English
	grün, schön	gröön, schöön	jreen, scheen	grie, schee	גרין, שײן grin, sheyn	groen, mooi/schoon	green, beautiful {compare archaic sheen}
to ei [ɛ]	Heu, rein	Hau, rein	Hei, rein	Hoi, rei	הײ, רײן hey, reyn	hooi, schoon/rein	hay, clean
/œ/ to e, a	Götter	Gödder	Jetta	Gedder	געטער geter	goden	gods

==== Diphthongization before g, k, ch [IPA x] and r, with possible loss of r ====
Standard High German	Northern Low German	Plautdietsch	Pennsylvania German	Yiddish	Dutch	English
Herz	Hart	Hoat	Hatz	האַרץ harts	hart	heart
machen	maken	moake(n)	mache	מאַכן makhn	maken	make
fragen	fragen	froage(n)	frooge	פֿרעגן fregn	vragen	ask (compare Old English frægn)
hoch	hooch	huach	hoch	הױך hoykh	hoog	high
Horn, Hörner	Hoorn, Höörn	Huarn, Hieena	Hann, Hanner	האָרן, הערנער horn, herner	hoorn, hoorns	horn, horns

The deletion of r has been completed in most final positions, after front vowels and before alveolar consonants, but is still retained in the infinitive of verbs, after short vowels, and sometimes after back vowels as seen in the example Huarn, Hieena.

==== Various other vowel equivalences ====
	Proto-Germanic	Standard High German	Northern Low German	Plautdietsch	Pennsylvania German	Yiddish	Dutch	English
/a/ = /o/	*watraz, *fadar, *namōn	Wasser, Vater, Name	Water, Vader, Naam	Wota, Voda, Nomen	Wasser, Vadder, Naame	װאַסער, פֿאָטער, נאָמען vaser, foter, nomen	water, vader, naam	water, father, name
/ai/ = ee [ɔɪ]	*saiwalō, *ainaz, *twai	Seele, eins, zwei	Seel, een, twee	Seel, eent, twee	Seel, eens, zwee	נשמה (זײל), אײן, צװײ neshome (possibly zeyl), eyn, tsvey	ziel, één, twee	soul, one, two
/æ/, /ō/ = oo [ɔʊ]^{1}	*raudas, *hōdaz	rot, Hut	root, Hoot	root, Hoot	rot, Hut	רױט, הוט royt, hut	rood, hoed	red, hood

1. /æ/ shifted to /au/ before voiced consonants.

==== Palatalization ====
All words with a /ɡ/ or /k/ preceding or following a front vowel (/e/ or /i/, not counting schwa) have been shifted to /j/ and /c/ (the latter has been written as kj or tj), even if there is another consonant between the vowel and the consonant. An intervocalic /ɡ/ is palatalized as the voiced palatal stop /ɟ/, written gj or dj. (A similar event occurred with English, but not as generalized). Where an /e/ or /i/ has been sunken to /a/, the palatalized sound is retained. Also where German has a palatalization (of the shifted /ç/ consonant), Plautdietsch retains the palatalization (of /k/) even after lowering a front vowel.

Standard High German	Northern Low German	Plautdietsch	Pennsylvania German	Yiddish	Dutch	English
gestern	gistern/güstern	jistren	geschder	נעכטן nekhtn	gisteren	yesterday
geben	gäven/geven	jäwen	gewwe	געבן gebn	geven	give
Kirche	Kark	Kjoakj	Kaerrich	קירך kirkh	kerk	church
Brücke	Brügg, Brügge	Brigj	Brick	בריק brik	brug	bridge
Milch	Melk	Malkj	Millich	מילך milkh	melk	milk
recht	recht	rajcht	recht	רעכט rekht	recht	right

== Influences and borrowings ==
=== German ===
Most Anabaptists that settled in the Vistula Delta were of Dutch or northern German origins, and were joined by refugees from different parts of Germany and Switzerland, who influenced their developing language. After almost two centuries in West Prussia, German replaced Dutch as church, school and written language and has become a source from where words are borrowed extensively, especially for religious terms. Many of these words show the effects of the High German consonant shift, even though they are otherwise adapted into Plautdietsch phonetics. Compare:

Plautdietsch	Standard High German	Low German	Pennsylvania German	Dutch	English
Zol	Zahl	Tahl/Tall	Zaahl	tal	number (compare "(to) tally")
jreessen	grüßen	gröten (but Westphalian: gruißen)	griesse	groeten	greet
kjamfen	kämpfen	fechten; kempen	fechde	vechten	fight

This is the case particularly on nouns made out of verbs. The verb normally shows the unshifted consonant, whereas the noun has a shifted Germanized consonant: schluten, Schluss; bräakjen, Bruch (to close, closure; to break, a break)

=== Dutch ===
The first half of the 16th century was the onset of the rule of terror by the Duke of Alba in the Spanish Low Countries during the Dutch Revolt (a.k.a. Eighty Years' War), that was centered on religious freedom for the Protestants. As a result, many Mennonites and Reformed left the country. This continued in the 17th century, when the Dutch Reformed Church became the official religion, being less than indulgent to other types of Protestantism, let alone the types perceived as radical (non-violent, no bearing of arms, no recognition of worldly authorities). In Low German area, they left their language traces in particular at the lower Vistula, around Danzig and Elbing, and up the river towards Toruń.

=== Old Prussian and Baltic languages ===
Plautdietsch	Origin	English
Mejal	Margell	girl
Kujel	Kuigel	male pig

=== Russian or Ukrainian ===
Wherever Mennonites settled, they found new foods and other items with which they were not familiar with. When that happened, they took the name that local people used for those items. The following words are of Russian or Ukrainian origin:

Plautdietsch	Standard High German	English	Russian	Ukrainian
Bockelzhonn	Aubergine	aubergine	баклажан (baklazhan, "eggplant")	баклажан (baklazhan, "eggplant")
Arbus/Erbus/Rebus	Wassermelone	watermelon	арбуз (arbuz)	кавун (kavun, "squash, melon")
Schisnikj	Knoblauch	garlic	чеснок (chesnok)	часник (chasnyk)

=== English ===
As Mennonites came into contact with new technology, they often adopted and adapted the names for those technologies. For Mennonites who had settled in North America in the 1870s, all new words were borrowed from English. Even though many of those settlers left for South America only 50 years after their arrival, they kept and sometimes adapted these words into the Mennonite Low German Phonetics:

English word	Adapted PD word	IPA	alternate word
bicycle	Beissikjel	bɛsɪcl	Foaraut
highway	Heiwä	hɛve	Huachwajch
truck	Trock	trɔk	-

In particular, words for auto parts are taken from English: hood, fender, brakes (along with the more Low German form Brams), spark plugs (pluralized Ploggen), but also words like peanuts, belt, tax.

=== Spanish ===
Plautdietsch speakers living in Spanish-speaking countries use many Spanish words in daily speech, especially in business and communication (telephone, for instance) vocabulary. Two examples of words that are completely adapted into Mennonite Low German are Burra (Spanish burro, donkey) and Wratsch (Mexican Spanish huarache, sandal). Both have a Low German plural: Burrasch, Wratschen. The pure Low German words Äsel and Schlorr are seldom used in Mexico.

== Spelling ==
The spelling of Plautdietsch has also been controversial. The main criteria for spelling systems have been:

1. Spelling should be as phonetic as possible.
2. German spelling rules should be applied whenever possible.

One problem has been what letters to use for sounds that do not exist in German, such as the palatal /c/ and /ʝ/ sounds, which are both pronounced and spelled differently in various dialects of Plautdietsch. Old Colony speakers pronounce these sounds by striking the middle of the tongue against the palate. Others, especially speakers of the Molotschna dialect, instead strike the tongue against the alveolar ridge and spell them ⟨tj⟩ and ⟨dj⟩. Most Plautdietsch speakers' ears are not accustomed to realize these subtle, if not trivial, differences, and will often confuse one with the other.

Other problematic areas: use or non-use of ⟨v⟩ for some words with /f/ sound, use or non-use of Dehnungs-h, when to double consonants and when not to.

When comparing different writers, one must take into account the dialect of that writer. The most famous Plautdietsch writer, Arnold Dyck, wrote in the Molotschna dialect, though his origins were from the Old Colony. During his life, he made many changes in his spelling system. His developments are a basis for the various spellings used today. In the following table, only his final system is taken into account, as used in his famous Koop enn Bua series, along with Herman Rempel (Kjenn Jie noch Plautdietsch?), Reuben Epp (Plautdietsche Schreftsteckja), Jack Thiessen (Mennonite Low German Dictionary), J. J. Neufeld (Daut niehe Tastament) and Ed Zacharias (De Bibel). The latter two claim to write in the Old Colony dialect, as seen in their verb endings, while the other three use the Plautdietsch as spoken by the descendants of the Bergthal Colony, i. e. the Old Colony dialect with a loss of -n endings.

	A. Dyck	H. Rempel	R. Epp	J. Thiessen	J. J. Neufeld	Ed Zacharias	word meaning
	Molotschna	Bergthal			Old Colony		
verb endings	saje	saje	saje	saje	sajen	sajen	say
c sound	Tjoatj	Kjoakj	Kjoakj	Tjoatj	Kjoakj	Kjoakj	church
Dehnungs-h	ahm	am	ahm	ahm	am	am	him
oa diphthong	Froag	Froag	Froag	Froag	Fruog	Froag	question
ia/iə diphthong	Lea, learen, jeleat	Lea, learen, jeleat	Lea, learen, jeleat	Lea, learen, jeleat	Lea, learen, jeleat	Lia, lieren, jelieet	teaching, learn, learned
u/ü	du	dü	du	du	du	du	you
consonant doubling	rollen, jerollt, Golt	rollen, jerollt, Golt	rollen, jerollt, Golt	rollen, jerollt, Golt	rollen, jerollt, Gollt	rollen, jerolt, Golt	roll, rolled, gold
ua/ya diphthong	Wuat, Buak	Wuat, Büak	Wuat, Büak	Wuat, Büak	Wuut, Buuk	Wuat, Buak	word, book
[s/ts] sound	Zocka	Ssocka	Zocka	Zocka	Tsocka	Zocka	sugar
[f] sound	von	fonn	von	von	fonn	von	from

== Phonetics ==
Mennonite Low German has many sounds, including a few not found in other varieties of Low German.

=== Consonants ===
IPA chart of Mennonite Low German consonants
	Bilabial	Labiodental	Alveolar	Postalveolar	Palatal	Velar	Glottal
Nasal	m		n		ɲ ^{1}	ŋ ^{2}	
Stop	p b		t d		c ɟ^{3}	k ɡ	ʔ ^{4}
Fricative		f v ^{5}	s z ^{6}	ʃ ʒ ^{7}	ç j ^{8}	x (ɣ) ^{9}	h
Flap			ɾ ^{10}				
Approximant			ɹ ^{10}				
Lateral			l (ɫ) ^{11}				

Where symbols for consonants occur in pairs, the left represents the voiceless consonant and the right represents the voiced consonant. Observations: According to the spelling system of De Bibel these sounds are spelled as follows:

1. /ɲ/ – ⟨nj⟩ as in Kjinja ("children")
2. /ŋ/ – ⟨ng⟩ as in Hunga ("hunger")
3. /c ɟ/ – ⟨kj⟩ and ⟨gj⟩ as in Kjoakj ("church") and Brigj ("bridge")
4. /ʔ/ – no letter, but has to be used if a word that begins with a vowel or a prefix is added to a word which by itself starts with a vowel: ve'achten (to despise)
5. /f v/ – /f/ can be written as ⟨f⟩ or ⟨v⟩: Fada ("male cousin"), Voda ("father"). The only criterion is the spelling of these words in German. /v/ is spelled ⟨w⟩ as in German: Wota ("water")
6. /s z/ – at the beginning of a word and between vowels /z/ is written ⟨s⟩: sajen ("to say"), läsen ("to read"). The /s/ sound is written ⟨z⟩ at the beginning of a word (where some speakers pronounce it [ts]), ⟨ss⟩ between vowels and final after a short vowel: Zocka ("sugar"), waussen ("to grow"), Oss ("ox"). At the end of a word after a long vowel or consonant both are written ⟨s⟩, the reader has to know the word to pronounce the correct sound: Hos /hoz/ ("rabbit"), Os /os/ ("carrion").
7. /ʃ ʒ/ – ⟨sch⟩ and ⟨zh⟩ as in School ("school") and ruzhen ("rush"). ⟨sp⟩ and ⟨st⟩ represent /ʃp/ and /ʃt/ at the beginning of a word and if a prefix is attached to a word starting with ⟨sp⟩ or ⟨st⟩: spälen ("to play") bestalen ("to order").
8. /ç j/ – ⟨j⟩ as in Joa ("year"). The /ç/ sound is written ⟨ch⟩ after consonants, ⟨e⟩, ⟨i⟩ and ⟨äa⟩: Erfolch ("success"), Jesecht ("face"), Jewicht ("weight"), läach ("low"). After ⟨a⟩, it is written ⟨jch⟩ to differentiate it from /x/: rajcht ("right")
9. /x ɣ/ – /x/ is written ⟨ch⟩, only occurs after back vowels: Dach ("day"), Loch ("hole"). [ɣ] (an allophone of /ɡ/) is rendered ⟨g⟩ between vowels and final: froagen ("to ask"), vondoag ("today"). At the beginning of a word and before consonants, g has the [ɡ] sound.
10. /ɾ ɹ/ – ⟨r⟩ is a flap (like the Spanish r), or depending on the person, even a trill (like Spanish ⟨rr⟩), before vowels: root ("red"), groot ("big"), Liera ("teacher"); /ɹ/ pronounced as an approximant (English r) before a consonant, at the end and in the -ren endings of Old Colony speakers: kort ("short"), ar ("her"), hieren ("to hear"). The uvular German r [ʀ] is not heard in Plautdietsch.
11. /l ɫ/ – [ɫ] is an allophone of [l] that occurs after vowels in words like Baul and well.

=== Vowels ===
Vowels of the Canadian Old Colony dialect, from Cox, Driedger & Tucker (2013:224)

The vowel inventory of Plautdietsch is large, with 13 simple vowels, 10 diphthongs and one triphthong.

Vowels in Plautdietsch
Class	Front	Central	Back
Close	i y		u
Near-close	ɪ		ʊ
Close-mid	e	ə	o
Open-mid	ɛ	ə	ɔ
Open		a	ɑ

- /y/ is rounded and is heard only in the Old Colonyand Bergthal groups. It corresponds to /u/ in other dialects.
- This table gives only a very general idea of Plautdietsch vowels, as their exact phonetic realizations vary considerably from dialect to dialect, although these differences are poorly documented. For instance, in the Canadian Old Colony dialect, /ɪ, ɛ/ are strongly lowered to [ɛ, æ], /ʊ/ is mid-centralized to [ɵ̞], whereas there is hardly any difference between /a/ and /ɔ/ (there is no /ɑ/ in that variety), with both being pronounced [ɐ] or [ɑ], although they are probably still distinguished by length and F3 values. Traditionally, Plautdietsch has been said to not have phonemic vowel length.

Plautdietsch vowels with example words
Symbol		Example		
IPA	orthography	IPA	orthography	English translation
ɪ	i	bɪt	bitt	"(he) bites"
i	ie	bit	Biet	"piece"
ʉ	u	bʉt	but	"(he) builds"
ɛ	e	ʃɛp	Schepp	"ship"
e̝	ä	be̝t	bät	"bit"
e	ei	lev	Leiw	"lion"
ə	e	də	de	"the"
ɔ	au	bɔl	Baul	"ball"
a	a	bad	Bad	"bed"
ɑ~ʌ	o	bʌl	Boll	"bull"
oː	o	rot	Rot	"advice"
u	u	rua	Rua	"tube, pipe"
ʊ	u	bʊk	Buck	"stomach"
ɔɪ	ee	bɔɪt	Beet	"beet"
ʌɪ	ee	ʌɪnt	Eent	"one"
œ~ø	oo	bøt	Boot	"boat"
ia	ia	via	wia	"(he) was"
iə	iee	viət	wieet	"worth"
ea	äa	vea	wäa	"who"
oa	oa	boa	Boa	"drill"
ua	ua	vua	wua	"where"
uə	ua	vuət	Wuat	"word"
ʉa	ua	bʉa	Bua	"farmer"
ɪu	ua	bɪuk	Buak	"book"
ɔɪa	ea	bɔɪa	Bea	"beer"

The /u/ sound has been shifted to /y/ in the Old Colony dialect, leaving the sound only as part of the ua diphthong. However, in certain areas and age groups, there is a heavy tendency to shift /o/ sound up to [u].

Pronunciation of certain vowels and diphthongs varies from some speakers to others; the diphthong represented by ee for instances is pronounced [oi] or even [ei] by some. Likewise the long vowels represented by au and ei might have a diphthong glide into [ʊ] and [ɪ], respectively.

- English sound equivalents are approximate. Long vowels ä and o do not have a diphthong glide.

== Grammar ==
Low German grammar resembles High German, as the syntax and morphology is nearly the same as High German's. Over the years, Plautdietsch has lost some inflection. It is, however, still moderately inflectional, having two numbers, three genders, two cases, two tenses, three persons, two moods, two voices, and two degrees of comparison.

=== Articles ===
Even though Plautdietsch has three genders, in the nominative case it has only two definite articles (like Dutch and Low German); masculine and feminine articles are homophonous. However, masculine and feminine indefinite articles are still different (like German) and thus, the three genders can still be perfectly established. In the oblique case, the masculine has a special definite article, making it once more different from the feminine, which, like the neuter, does not change. In the plural number, all gender identification is lost (as in German, Dutch and Low German); all plural determiners and adjective endings are homophonous with the feminine singular.

Plautdietsch articles
Article class	Definite				Indefinite		
Number	Singular			Plural	Singular		
Gender	masc.	fem.	neuter	all	masc.	fem.	neuter
Nominative	de	de	daut	de	een	eene	een
Oblique	dän	de	daut	de	eenen*	eene	een

- In colloquial speech the indefinite article is reduced practically to a "n", or "ne" if feminine. If used so, there is no case distinction. However, when used as a numeral, meaning "one", the diphthong "ee" is heavily stressed and the oblique form of the masculine gender is used. There is no indefinite plural article; een has no plural.

Some Plautdietsch writers try to use a three case system with the definite articles, without much consistency. The system looks somewhat like this, some might use the dative neuter articles, others might not:

Number	Singular			Plural
Gender	masc.	fem.	neut.	all
Nominative	de	de	daut	de
Accusative	dän	de	daut	de
Dative	däm	de	däm	de

==== Determiners ====
	Masc. Nom.	Masc. Obj.	Feminine	Neuter	Plural all
this	dis	disen	dise	dit	dise
that, proximal	dee	dän	dee	daut	dee
that, distal	jan	janen	jane	jan	jane
which	woon	woonen	woone	woon	woone
such a	soon	soonen	soone	soon	soone
my	mien	mienen	miene	mien	miene

All possessives (see under pronouns) are declined like in this way. With the form äa (her/their) an r has to be reinserted before adding endings (äaren, äare).

=== Nouns ===
Mennonite Low German nouns inflect into two numbers: singular and plural, three genders: masculine, feminine, and neuter, but only two cases, nominative and oblique. The historical dative and accusative have merged, even though some writers try to maintain a three cases distinction, which has been lost for most speakers, perhaps centuries ago. The oblique case is distinct from the nominative only in 1) personal pronouns: ekj froag am, hee auntwuat mie (I ask him, he answers me) 2) articles and demonstrative and possessive adjectives in the singular masculine gender: de Voda halpt dän Sän (the father helps the son) (observe: nouns are not inflected themselves) and 3) proper names, i. e. traditional Mennonite names: Peeta frajcht Marie-en, Marie auntwuat Peetren (Peter asks Mary, Mary answers Peter)

	Singular			Plural		
	Masculine	Feminine	Neuter	Masculine	Feminine	Neuter
Nominative	de Mensch	de Sonn	daut Hüs	de Menschen	de Sonnen	de Hiesa
Oblique	dän Mensch	de Sonn	daut Hüs	de Menschen	de Sonnen	de Hiesa

==== Plurals ====
Plural formation is comparatively complex. Three major procedures can be established: 1) through an ending, -a, -en, -s, -sch or none at all; 2) voicing the final devoiced consonant and 3) fronting (and maybe lowering) a back vowel, which might require palatalization of a velar consonant. A given word could have one or two, all or none of these characteristics.

===== Examples =====
No ending, no voicing, no vowel fronting: de Fesch de Fesch, daut Schop, de Schop, daut Been, de Been (fish, fishes; sheep, sheep; leg, legs)

Voicing, no ending, no vowel fronting: Frint, Friend; Boajch, Boaj (friend/s, mountain/s)

No ending, no voicing, vowel fronting: Foot, Feet (foot, feet)

Voicing and vowel fronting, no ending: Hoot, Heed (hat/s)

-a ending:

only: Licht, Lichta (light/s)

with voicing: Bilt, Bilda (picture/s)

with vowel fronting: Maun, Mana (man, men)

with voicing, vowel fronting and palatalization: Kaulf, Kjalwa (calf, calves)

-en ending (the -en, -s and -sch endings have no vowel fronting)

only: Näs Näsen, (nose/s)

with voicing: de Tiet, de Tieden, de Erfoarunk, de Erfoarungen (time/s, experience/s)

Words where a historical r is dropped require it to be reinserted: Däa, Däaren (door/s) Polysyllabic words with a vocalized r drop the final a: Sesta, Sestren (sister/s)

An unstressed schwa also is dropped: Gaufel, Gauflen (fork/s)

-s ending

This class consists mainly of 1) short masculine and neuter nouns: Baul -s, Oarm -s (ball/s, arm/s)

2) words related with family members: Sän -s, Fru -es, (son/s, woman, women)

and 3) masculine and neuter nouns ending in -el and -en (the latter may drop the n): Läpel, Läpels; Goaden, Goades (spoon/s; garden/s)

-sch ending

This class consists of masculine and neuter polysyllabic nouns ending with -a: de Voda, de Vodasch; daut Massa, de Massasch (father/s, knife, knives)

For someone knowing (High) German, pluralizing is a fairly predictable process, with some exceptions: the -en ending covers pretty much the same words in both languages; the -a ending is the equivalent for the German -er plural, where German has Umlaut, Plautdietsch will have vowel fronting in most cases. The -s and -sch groups are made almost entirely of polysyllabic nouns which in German have no plural ending.

The most problematic words are those with an -e plural ending in German. Although the entire class with no ending is made out of them, many other words are treated differently. For example, the plurals for Stool and Stock (chair and stick) are Steela and Stakja (compare German Stuhl, Stühle; Stock, Stöcke). Since they have their vowels fronted there seems to be no reason for the -a ending. Many others have been moved into the -en class: Jeboot, Jebooten (commandment/s, German: Gebot, Gebote). With some not so common words, there is no certainty about the correct plural, different speakers create them in different ways: the plural of Jesaz (law) could be Jesaza or Jesazen (German: Gesetz, Gesetze).

==== Possession ====
The classical genitive is no longer used except in a few relic expressions. Instead, possession is expressed as in many German dialects with the his genitive, i.e. naming the possessor in the oblique case with the possessive adjective and the possessed object: Dän Maun sien Hus (the man's house). With proper nouns, and when the possessor is determined by a possessive adjective, the possessor is in the nominative case instead: Peeta sien Hus (Peter's house); mien Voda sien Hus (my father's house). Very long possessive clauses can be created: Mien Voda seine Mutta äare Mutta es miene Uagrootmutta (my father's mother's mother is my great grandmother).

For inanimate or generalized constructions, the preposition von or a composition are used instead: De Lichta von de Staut/ de Stautslichta (the lights of the city).

==== Diminutive ====
The diminutive is formed adding by -kje to the noun: de Jung, daut Jungkje; de Mejal, daut Mejalkje (the boy, the little boy; the girl, the little girl). All diminutive nouns take the neuter gender, with two exceptions: de Oomkje, de Mumkje, two forms used very commonly for mister/man/husband and mistress/woman/wife. These seem to have been created originally as diminutive forms of, respectively, Oom and Mumm (uncle and aunt; cf. German: Oheim/Ohm, Öhmchen/Öhmlein and Muhme, Mühmchen/Mühmlein). Today, they are no longer seen as diminutives and therefore retain their respective masculine and feminine genders.

With nouns ending in t or k, only -je is added; a few nouns ending in kj, an additional s is inserted: de Staut, daut Stautje, daut Buak, daut Buakje; daut Stekj, daut Stekjsje (the (little) city, the (little) book, the (little) piece).

Plural diminished nouns take -s ending: Jungkjes, Mejalkjes; however, if the original plural requires fronting of a back vowel or has an -a ending, these features are retained before adding the diminutive suffix: de Stool, de Steela → daut Stoolkje, de Steelakjes (chair/s, little chair/s)

=== Adjectives ===
Mennonite Low German also shows a varied inflectional system in its adjectives. There are three genders: feminine, masculine and neuter, and two comparison degrees: Comparative and Superlative.

	Predicate	Masculine	Fem/Pl/Weak Neuter	Strong Neuter**	Oblique***
Positive	woam	woama	woame	woamet	woamen
Comparative	woama	woamra	woamre	woamret	woamren
Superlative	woamst-	woamsta	woamste	woamstet	woamsten

The plural of all genders is identical to the feminine singular.

Strong and weak neuter declension: after the definite article daut or the demonstratives daut and dit (neuter form of that, this) the t is dropped and a form identical to the feminine and plural is used. In other situations, as with indefinite articles, possessive adjectives or without article, the strong form is used.

The oblique is used only in the masculine singular. However, if a preposition-article compound is used with a neuter noun, then the oblique would be used. Example: em grooten Hus, but: en daut groote Hus, en een grootet Hus.

There is no predicate form for the superlative, a preposition-article compound with the oblique or weak neuter is used: aum woamsten, or: oppet woamste, or newly just the neuter form without preposition: daut woamste: Zemorjes es et woam, opp Meddach woat et woama, no Meddach es et aum woamsten/ oppet woamste/ daut woamste (in the morning it is warm, at noon it is getting warmer, after noon it is the warmest).

The predicate form is used in predicate sentences for all genders: De Maun es oolt, de Fru es oolt, daut Hus es oolt (the man is old, the woman is old, the house is old).

=== Numerals ===
0-9	0 null	1 eent	2 twee	3 dree	4 vea	5 fief/fiew	6 sas	7 säwen	8 acht	9 näajen
10-19	10 tieen	11 alf/alw	12 twalf/twalw	13 drettieen	14 vieetieen	15 feftieen	16 sastieen	17 säwentieen	18 achttieen	19 näajentieen
20-1000	20 twintich	30 dartich	40 vieetich	50 feftich	60 zastich	70 zäwentich	80 tachentich	90 näajentich	100 hundat	1000 dusend
0-99			22 twee un twintich	33 dree un dartich	44 vea un vieetich	55 fiew un feftich	66 sas un zastich	77 säwen un zäwentich	88 acht un tachentich	99 näajen un näajentich
ordinal		1st ieeschta	2d tweeda	3d dredda	4th vieeda	5th fefta	6th sasta	7th säwenda	8th achta	9th näajenda
partitive			1/2 haulf, de Halft	1/3 een Dreddel	1/4 een Vieedel	1/5 een Feftel	1/6 een Sastel	1/7 een Säwendel	1/8 een Achtel	1/9 een Näajendel

Observation: the numeral eent (one) is declined like the indefinite article (masculine een [oblique eenen], feminine eene, neuter een) or a demonstrative or possessive pronoun (eena [oblique eenen], eene, eent for the respective genders); when counting, the neuter form eent is used.

The ordinal for 11th and 12th are: alfta, twalfta; from 13 to 19 use the ordinal + da: drettieenda (13th); from 20 to 99 use the ordinal + sta: fiew un twintichsta (25th). All ordinal numbers are declined like an adjective, the forms given here are masculine nominative.

The partitive numbers for 1/10, 1/11, 1/12 are een Tieedel, een Alftel, een Twalftel, for 13–19 add -del to the ordinal number, for 20–99 add -stel.

=== Pronouns ===
==== Personal pronouns ====
	Singular					Plural		
Person	1st	2d	3d masc	3d fem	3d nt	1st	2d	3d
Nominative	ekj	du	hee	see	daut (et)	wie	jie	dee, see
Oblique	mie	die	am	ar (äa)	daut (et)	ons	junt (ju)	an (äant)
Reflexive	mie	die	sikj			ons	junt (ju)	sikj
Possessive Adjectives	mien	dien	sien	äa	sien	ons	jun	äa

Some pronouns have two forms, different persons may use one or other form, or even alternate between them. Daut is used at the beginning of a sentence, but may be replaced by et in other positions.

Possessive adjectives are of the masculine (nominative case) or neuter gender. Otherwise, they are declined like the indefinite article and determiners (see under article section).

==== Demonstrative pronouns ====
	masc	fem	nt	plural
Nominative	dee	dee	daut	dee
Oblique	dän	dee/däa	daut	dee/dän

Demonstrative pronouns are frequently used instead of the personal pronouns. When used so, some people use special oblique forms for feminine and plural. When used strictly demonstrative, only the singular masculine has a special oblique form.

=== Verbs ===
Mennonite Low German verbs have six tenses. The present and first past tenses are inflected, while the second and third past and both future tenses are different words marked by auxiliary verbs. Verbs can have two moods: Declarative and Imperative, two voices: active and passive, and three persons:1st pers. sing., 2nd pers. sing., 3rd pers. sing., and plural.

==== Weak verbs ====
The basic conjugation pattern is as follows:

-	1st sing	2nd sing	3rd sing	plural
present	stem	stem + st	stem + t	infinitive*
past	stem + d	stem + sd	stem + d	stem + den
imperative	-	stem	-	stem + t

To determine the stem, take the infinitive and drop the -en ending. There are a few modifications to this basic pattern: 1) If the stem ends with a plosive or fricative voiced consonant (d, g, j, soft s, w, zh), that consonant is devoiced in the 2nd and 3d persons of the present, since voiceless t and st automatically force the preceding consonant (compare the sound of the letter d in English lived and liked). 2) If the stem ends with a voiceless consonant (ch, f, jch, k, kj, p, hard s, sch, t) that consonant devoices the d, sd, d, den endings of the past tense (into t, st, t, ten) for the same reason. 3) If the stem ends with two consonants, the second one being a nasal or lateral, a schwa e is inserted to ease pronunciation. 4) Verbs with a diphthong and r have a special treatment; the r is dropped before endings are attached, and the st/sd of the second person is replaced by scht/zhd.

Examples of a regular verbs: spälen (to play), lachen (to laugh), läwen (to live), odmen (to breathe) and roaren (to cry). The first one follows strictly the basic pattern, the others show the various adjustments needed as described above.

If the inverted word order is used, the -en ending of the plural wie, jie (but not see) form is dropped, and a root-only form, identical to the 1st person singular, is used.

	ekj	du	hee, see, daut	wie, jie, see	____ wie, jie
spälen, to play
present	späl	spälst	spält	spälen	späl
past	späld	spälsd	späld	spälden	späld
imperative	-	späl (du)	-	spält (jie)	
lachen, to laugh
present	lach	lachst	lacht	lachen	lach
past	lacht	lachst	lacht	lachten	lacht
imperative	-	lach (du)	-	lacht (jie)	
läwen, to live
present	läw	läfst	läft	läwen	läw
past	läwd	läwsd	läwd	läwden	läwd
imperative	-	läw (du)	-	läft (jie)	
odmen, to breathe
present	odem	odemst	odemt	odmen	odem
past	odemd	odemsd	odemd	odemden	odemd
imperative	-	odem (du)	-	odemt (jie)	
roaren, to cry
present	roa	roascht	roat	roaren	roa
past	road	roazhd	road	roaden	road
imperative	-	roa (du)	-	roat (jie)	

==== Strong verbs ====
As in English and Dutch, some verbs have a vowel change in past tense and past participle. As in German, some verbs might have a vowel change in second and third person of the singular in present tense as well. A few verbs that are strong in German are weak in Plautdietsch, but many German weak verbs are strong in Plautdietsch. However, when compared with Dutch and English, those are strong, too.

	ekj	du	hee, see, daut	wie, jie, see	____ wie, jie
finjen, to find
present	finj	finjst	finjt	finjen	finj
past	funk	fungst	funk	fungen	fung
Imperative		finj (du)		finjt (jie)	
sieekjen, to seek
present	sieekj	sieekjst	sieekjt	sieekjen	sieekj
past	socht	sochst	socht	sochten	socht
Imperative		sieekj (du)		sieekjt (jie)	
sajen, to say
present	saj	sajchst	sajcht	sajen	saj
past	säd	sätst	säd	säden	säd
Imperative		saj (du)		sajcht (jie)	
jäwen, to give
present	jäw	jefst	jeft	jäwen	jäw
past	jeef	jeefst	jeef	jeewen	jeew
Imperative		jeff (du)		jäft (jie)	
schriewen, to write
present	schriew	schrifst	schrift	schriewen	schriew
past	schreef	schreefst	schreef	schreewen	schreew
Imperative		schriew (du)		schrieft (jie)	
moaken, to make
present	moak	moakst	moakt	moaken	
past	müak	müakst	müak	müaken	
Imperative		moak{dü}		moakt{jie}	

GENERALITIES: Vowel changes in present tense are somewhat predictable: long ie and u change into short i; long ä/o change into e or a; diphthongs äa and oa are simplified to a.

The first and third person of the past tense are identical (as in weak verbs).

With only a few exceptions (like the verb sajen), all voiced consonants are devoiced in the three persons of the singular past, the nasal ng and nj are retained in second person, but devoiced in first and third person.

The past tense has the same vowel through all persons.

If there is a vowel change from ä to e or a in the present tense, that feature is retained in the singular imperative.

The plural form for wie/jie in the inverted word order keep the final consonant voiced.

==== Auxiliary, modal and anomalous verbs ====
A small groups of verbs are more irregular: the auxiliaries sennen and haben, the modal verbs, and a few verbs that originally were monosyllabic and with time have evolved a -nen ending:

	ekj	du	hee, see, daut	wie, jie, see	____ wie, jie
sennen, to be
present	sie (senn)	best	es	sent	sent
past	wia	wieescht	wia	wieren	wia
Imperative		sie (du)		siet (jie)	
haben, to have
present	hab	hast	haft	haben	hab
past	haud	hautst	haud	hauden	haud
Imperative		hab (du)		habt (jie)	
kjennen, can, to be able
present	kaun	kau(n)st	kaun	kjennen	kjenn
past	kunn	ku(n)st	kunn	kunnen	kunn
Imperative		-		-	
stonen, to stand
present	sto	steist	steit	stonen	sto
past	stunt	stuntst	stunt	stunden	stund
Imperative		sto (du)		stot (jie)	

==== Participles ====
The present participle, formed of the infinitive plus a -t ending, is not often used. It appears in idiomatic expressions like aunhoolent bliewen (to persist), and in a few adjective forms, which have to be inflected for number, gender and case, the -t is voiced into -d: koaken, koakendet Wota (to boil, boiling water).

The past participle of weak verbs is formed with je- plus the stem of the verb plus -t. A voiced consonant is devoiced to go along with t, the inserted e between double consonant is retained, the r after a long vowel is dropped. For the weak verbs given above the past participles are: jespält, jelacht, jejäft, jeodemt, jeroat.

The past participle for strong and anomalous verbs is hard to predict, they could be formed in five or six different ways:

1. some are like the weak verbs: jejäft, jesajcht (given, said);
2. others are formed of je- plus infinitive: jestonen (stood);
3. some, including modal verbs, of je- plus first person past tense: jehaut; jesocht, jekunt (had, sought, been able);
4. others of je- plus plural past: jefungen (found);
5. Those with an ee or oo in past tense are simplified to ä/o: jeschräwen, jedonen (written, done)
6. the past participle of sennen is jewast (been)

Adjectives are frequently made from the past participle by attaching an adjective inflection ending and voicing the final t; if the preceding consonant is voiced, with -en participles the e is dropped:

molen, jemolt, een jemoldet Bilt (to draw, drawn, a drawn picture)

koaken, jekoakt, eene jekoakte Ieedschock (to boil, boiled, a boiled potato)

stälen, jestolen, een jestolna Hunt (to steal, stolen, a stolen dog)

==== Compound tenses ====
Except for the present and simple past, all other tenses are constructed with the aid of the auxiliary verbs sennen, haben, woaren:

	ekj	du	hee, see, daut	wie, jie, see	____ wie, jie
Perfect	hab jespält	hast jespält	haft jespält	haben jespält	hab wie jespält
Plusquamperfect	haud jespält	haudst jespält	haud jespält	hauden jespält	haud wie jespält
Future	woa spälen	woascht spälen	woat spälen	woaren spälen	woa wie spälen
Conditional	wudd spälen	wurscht spälen	wudd spälen	wudden spälen	wudd wie spälen
Future II	woa jespält haben	woascht jespält haben	woat jespält haben	woaren jespält haben	woa wie jespält haben

Some intransitive verbs take sennen instead of haben as auxiliary verbs if they: 1) indicate a motion from one place to another, or 2) indicate a change of condition, or 3) the verbs sennen (to be) and bliewen (to keep being, to remain). Example: ekj sie jekomen, ekj sie oolt jeworden, ekj sie jewast (I have come, I have become old, I was).

=== Expressions relating to future plans ===
In some communities of Plautdietsch speakers, the religious prohibition of James 4:13-14 is interpreted to proscribe the simple use of the first person in talking about future plans or efforts. In such communities it is considered proper to use a softening introductory phrase such as "Ekj proove," (I try, or will try, or alternately I will want to) to avoid giving offense.

=== Prepositions ===
Plautdietsch preposition inventory is rich. Some of the most common:

- aun, on, in: de Klock henjt aun de Waunt (the clock is hanging on the wall)
- äwa, over, about
- besied, beside, next to
- bie, by, at
- bowa, over
- buta, except, besides
- derch, through
- en, in
- fa, for
- hinja, behind
- hinjaraun, following something else
- jäajen, against
- mank, among
- met, with
- no, to, after
- onen, without
- opp, on
- to, to
- tweschen, between (twixt)
- unja, under
- ver, in front of
- von, of (relative to)

=== Syntax ===
Mennonite Low German shows similarity with High German in the word order. The basic word order is subject–verb–object as in English. Indirect objects precede direct objects as in English John gives Mary a present, but that is where similarities end. A dependent verb, i.e. an infinitive or past participle, comes at the end of the sentence where in English it would be placed immediately after the main verb, as shown in the following examples:

Mennonite Low German word order: Jehaun haft dän Desch jemoakt (John has the table made). English word order: John has made the table.

Mennonite Low German, like High German, has been referred to as verb-second (V2) word order. In embedded clauses, words relating to time or space can be placed at the beginning of the sentence, but then the subject has to move after the main verb to keep that verb in second position. This pattern is demonstrated here:

Mennonite Low German word order: Nu sie ekj schaftich. More Examples: Dan jeef de Kjennich seine Deena eenen Befäl. (Then the king gave his servants an order)

Also, effects tend to be placed last in the sentence. Example: En daut Kuffel wia soo väl Wota, daut et äwarand (In the cup, there was so much water, that it overflowed).

Mennonite Low German has syntactic patterns not found in High German, or at least not as often, such as the repetition of a subject, by a pronoun. Example: Mien Hoot dee haft dree Akjen. My hat it has three corners.

Questions, orders and exclamations have a verb first word order: Hast du daut oole Hus aun de fefte Gauss jeseenen? (Have you seen the old house on fifth street?). All questions are arranged like this. There is no auxiliary verb to form questions. If there is a question word, that word precedes the verb: Wua es dien Voda jebuaren (Where is your father born?). As in English, when using verbs in the imperative mood, it is not necessary to specify the person addressed, but it can be added for emphasis: Brinj (du) mie emol dän Homa (Please, (you,) bring the hammer to me). The word emol is frequently asked to soften the order as a word for please. Example of an exclamation: Es daut vondoag oba kolt! (Is it cold today!).

Dependent clauses

As in High German, in dependent clauses, the verb goes at the end:

Ekj well morjen miene Mutta besieekjen, wan ekj Tiet hab. (I want to visit my mother tomorrow if I have time). Observe the construction of: if I have time.

However, when a dependent clause has an infinitive or past participle, this rule is no longer strictly applied; there is a strong tendency to move the finite (main) verb before the infinitive or participle, the direct object (or even a long circumstantial complement):

Example: German word order requires a sentence structure like: Hee fruach mie, auf ekj miene Mutta jistren daut Jelt jejäft haud. (Translation: He asked me if I had given the money yesterday to my mother.) Even though this sounds right and perfectly understandable, most speakers would rearrange these same words as follows: Hee fruach mie, auf ekj miene Mutta jistren haud daut Jelt jejäft. Another example: Hee sajcht, daut sien Brooda jrod no de Staut jefoaren es/ Hee sajcht, daut sien Brooda jrod es no de Staut jefoaren (He says that his brother has just gone to the city). Observe: the verb precedes a prepositional phrase, but an adverb is still placed before it.

== Text sample ==
The Lord's Prayer in Plautdietsch, another form of Low German and Dutch.

Plautdietsch	Low German	Dutch
Ons Voda em Himmel,	Uns Vadder in'n Heven,	Onze Vader, die in de hemel zijt,
lot dien Nome jeheilicht woare;	laat hilligt warrn dien Naam.	Uw naam worde geheiligd.
lot dien Kjennichrikj kome;	Laat kamen dien Königriek,	Uw (konink)rijk kome.
lot dien Welle jedone woare,	laat warrn dien Will,	Uw wil geschiede,
uck hia oppe Ead, soo aus em Himmel;	so as in'n Heven, so ok op de Eer.	op aarde zoals in de hemel.
jeff ons Dach fe Dach daut Broot, daut ons fehlt;	Uns dääglich Brood giff uns vundaag	Geef ons heden ons dagelijks brood,
en vejeff ons onse Schult,	un vergiff uns unse Schuld,	en vergeef ons onze schuld,
soo aus wie den vejewe, dee sich jeajen ons veschuldicht ha;	as wi de vergeven hebbt, de an uns schüllig worrn sünd.	zoals ook wij vergeven onze schuldenaars / zoals ook wij aan anderen hun schuld vergeven;
en brinj ons nich en Vesekjunk nenn,	Un laat uns nich versöcht warrn,	En leid ons niet in verzoeking / in bekoring,
oba rad ons von Beeset.	man maak uns frie vun dat Böös.	maar verlos ons van de boze / het kwade.
wiels die jehet daut Kjennichrikj,	Denn dien is dat Königriek	Want van U is het koninkrijk,
en dee Krauft en dee Harlichtjeit en Eewichtjeit.	un de Kraft un de Herrlichkeid in Ewigkeid.	en de kracht en de heerlijkheid in eeuwigheid.

== See also ==
- Russian Mennonite (speakers of Plautdietsch all around the globe)
- East Low German
- Gronings dialect
- Low Prussian dialect
- Plautdietsch-Freunde (German NGO, worldwide documentation and promotion of Plautdietsch)
- Silent Light, film by Carlos Reygadas
- Pennsylvania German language
- Hutterite German (not closely related linguistically, but also used primarily by an Anabaptist group)

== Literature ==
=== Dictionaries ===
- Neufeld, Eldo: Plautdietsch-English, English-Plaudietsch, Munich 2005.
- Rempel, Herman: Kjenn Jie Noch Plautdietsch? A Mennonite Low German Dictionary, PrairieView Press, 1995. ISBN 1-896199-13-5.
- Thiessen, Jack: Mennonite Low German Dictionary / Mennonitisch-Plattdeutsches Wörterbuch, University of Wisconsin, 2003. ISBN 0-924119-09-8.
- Zacharias, Ed Ons Ieeschtet Wieedabuak, 2009. ISBN 978-1-55383-223-2.

=== Grammars ===
- Neufeld, Eldo: Plautdietsch Grammar, 72 pages, Munich 2010.
- Siemens, Heinrich: Plautdietsch — Grammatik, Geschichte, Perspektiven, Bonn 2012.
