= Mennonites =

Anabaptist groups originating in Western Europe

- Emblem of the Mennonite World Conference

Total population
- ▲2.13 million (2018)

Regions with significant populations
- Ethiopia: 514,691
- United States: 458,418
- Dem. Republic of the Congo: 225,581
- Bolivia: 150,000
- Canada: 149,422
- India: 136,774
- Mexico: 110,000
- Indonesia: 102,761
- Tanzania: 92,350
- Thailand: 63,998
- Zimbabwe: 50,287
- Germany: 47,492
- Paraguay: 36,009
- Kenya: 35,575
- Angola: 30,555

Religions
- Anabaptist

Scriptures
- Bible

Mennonites are a group of Anabaptist Christian communities tracing their roots to the epoch of the Radical Reformation. The name Mennonites is derived from the Frisian cleric Menno Simons (1496–1561). Simons became a prominent leader within the wider Anabaptist movement and was a contemporary of Martin Luther (1483–1546) and Philip Melanchthon (1497–1560). Through his writings about the Reformation, Simons articulated and formalized the teachings of earlier Swiss Anabaptist founders as well as early teachings of the Mennonites founded on the belief in both the mission and ministry of Jesus. Formal Mennonite beliefs were codified in the Dordrecht Confession of Faith (1632), which affirmed "the baptism of believers only, the washing of the feet as a symbol of servanthood, church discipline, the shunning of the excommunicated, the non-swearing of oaths, marriage within the same church", nonresistance, and in general, more emphasis on "true Christianity" involving "being Christian and obeying Christ" as they interpret it from the Holy Bible.

The majority of the early Mennonite followers, rather than armed resistance, survived by fleeing to neighboring states where ruling families were tolerant of their belief in believer's baptism. Over the years, Mennonites have become known as one of the historic peace churches, due to their commitment to pacifism. Mennonites seek to emphasize the teachings of early Christianity in their beliefs, worship and lifestyle.

Congregations worldwide embody various approaches to Mennonite practice, ranging from Old Order Mennonites (who practice a lifestyle without certain elements of modern technology) to Conservative Mennonites (who hold to traditional theological distinctives, wear plain dress and use modern conveniences) to mainline Mennonites (those who are indistinguishable in dress and appearance from the general population). Mennonites can be found in communities in 87 countries on six continents. Seven ordinances have been taught in many traditional Mennonite churches, which include "baptism, communion, footwashing, marriage, anointing with oil, the holy kiss, and the prayer covering." The largest populations of Mennonites are found in Canada, the Democratic Republic of the Congo, Ethiopia, India, and the United States. There are Mennonite settlements in Argentina, Belize, Bolivia, Brazil, Mexico, Peru, Uruguay, Paraguay, and Colombia. The Mennonite Church in the Netherlands still continues where Simons was born.

Though Mennonites are a global denomination with church membership from Europe, Asia, Africa and the Americas, certain Mennonite communities with ethno-cultural origins in Switzerland and the Netherlands bear the designation of ethnic Mennonites.

== History ==
The early history of the Mennonites starts with the Anabaptists in the German and Dutch-speaking regions of central Europe. The German term is Täufer (Baptist) or Wiedertäufer ("re-Baptizers" or "Anabaptists" using the Greek ana ["again"]), as their persecutors called them. These forerunners of modern Mennonites were part of the Protestant Reformation, a broad reaction against the practices and theology of the Roman Catholic Church. Its most distinguishing feature is the rejection of infant baptism, an act that had both religious and political meaning since almost every infant born in western Europe was baptized in the Roman Catholic Church. Other significant theological views of the Mennonites developed in opposition to Roman Catholic views or to the views of Protestant reformers such as Martin Luther and Huldrych Zwingli.

Some of the followers of Zwingli's Reformed church thought that requiring church membership beginning at birth was inconsistent with the New Testament example. They believed that the church should be completely removed from government (the proto–free church tradition), and that individuals should join only when willing to publicly acknowledge belief in Jesus and the desire to live in accordance with his teachings. At a small meeting in Zurich on 21 January 1525, Conrad Grebel, Felix Manz, and George Blaurock, along with twelve others, baptized each other. This meeting marks the beginning of the Anabaptist movement. In the spirit of the times, other groups came to preach about reducing hierarchy, relations with the state, eschatology, and sexual license, running from utter abandon to extreme chastity. These movements are together referred to as the "Radical Reformation".

Many government and religious leaders, both Protestant and Roman Catholic, considered voluntary church membership to be dangerous—the concern of some deepened by reports of the Münster Rebellion, led by a violent sect of Anabaptists. They joined forces to fight the movement, using methods such as banishment, torture, burning, drowning or beheading.

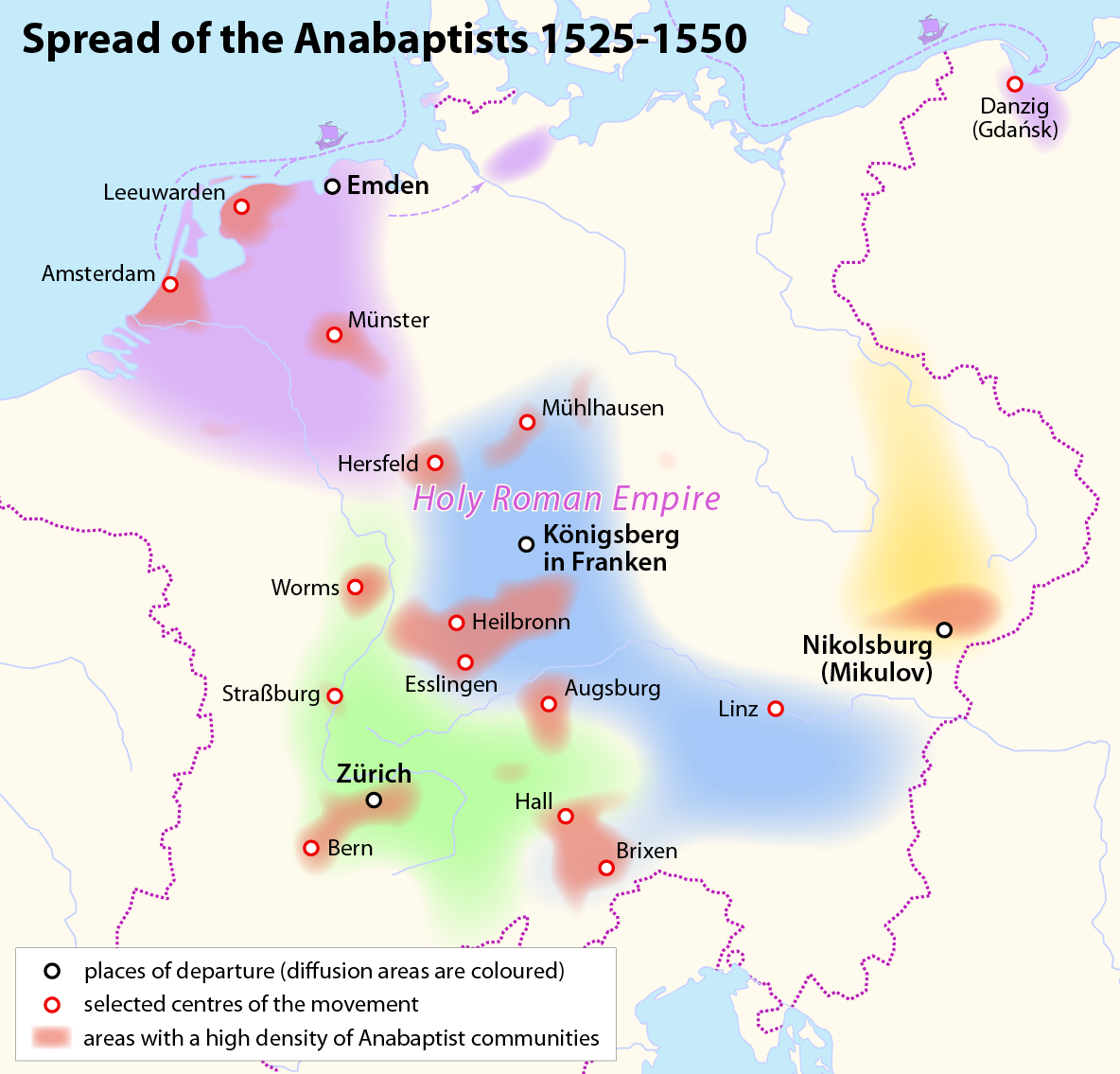
Spread of the early Anabaptists, 1525–1550

Despite strong repressive efforts of the state churches, the movement spread slowly around western Europe, primarily along the Rhine. Officials killed many of the earliest Anabaptist leaders in an attempt to purge Europe of the new sect. By 1530, most of the founding leaders had been killed for refusing to renounce their beliefs. Many believed that God did not condone killing or the use of force for any reason and were, therefore, unwilling to fight for their lives. The non-resistant branches often survived by seeking refuge in neutral cities or nations, such as Strasbourg. Their safety was often tenuous, as a shift in alliances or an invasion could mean resumed persecution. Other groups of Anabaptists, such as the Batenburgers, were eventually destroyed by their unwillingness to fight. This played a large part in the evolution of Anabaptist theology. They believed that Jesus taught that any use of force to get back at anyone was wrong, and taught to forgive.

Menno Simons

In the early days of the Anabaptist movement, Menno Simons, a Catholic priest in the Low Countries, heard of the movement and started to rethink his Catholic faith. He questioned the doctrine of transubstantiation but was reluctant to leave the Roman Catholic Church. His brother, a member of an Anabaptist group, was killed when he and his companions were attacked and refused to defend themselves. In 1536, at the age of 40, Simons left the Roman Catholic Church. He soon became a leader within the Anabaptist movement and was wanted by authorities for the rest of his life. His name became associated with scattered groups of nonviolent Anabaptists whom he helped to organize and consolidate.

=== Fragmentation and variation ===
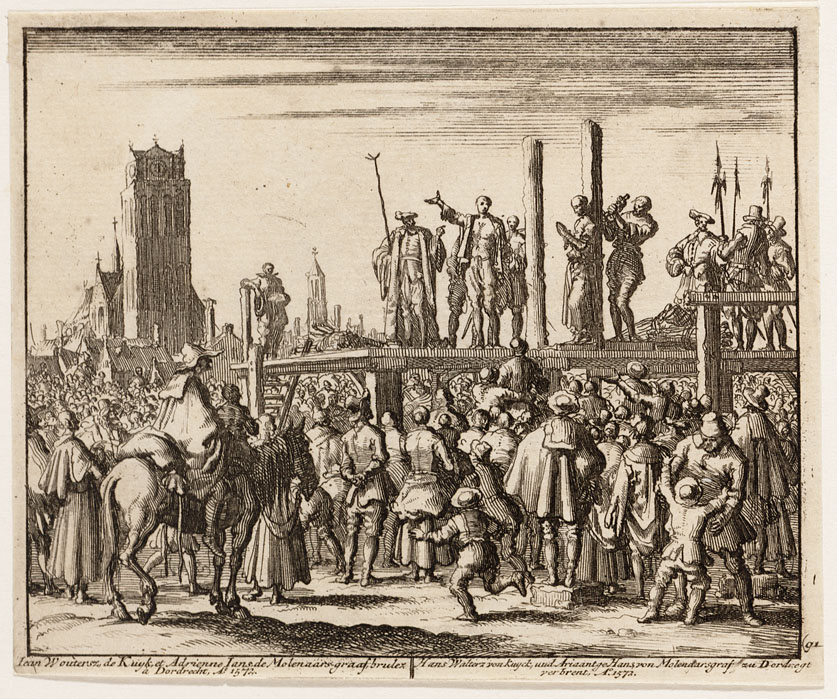
Execution of the Mennonites Jan Woutersz van Cuyck and Adriaanken Jans in Dordrecht in 1572 (Engraving by Jan Luyken for the 1685 edition of the Martyrs Mirror)

During the 16th century, the Mennonites and other Anabaptists were relentlessly persecuted. This period of persecution has had a significant impact on Mennonite identity. Martyrs Mirror, published in 1660, documents much of the persecution of Anabaptists and their predecessors, including accounts of over 4,000 burnings of individuals, and numerous stonings, imprisonments, and live burials. Today, the book is still the most important book besides the Bible for many Mennonites and Amish, in particular for the Swiss-South German branch of the Mennonites. Persecution was still going on until 1710 in various parts of Switzerland.

In 1693, Jakob Ammann led an effort to reform the Mennonite church in Switzerland and South Germany to include shunning, to hold communion more often, and other differences. When the discussions fell through, Ammann and his followers split from the other Mennonite congregations. Ammann's followers became known as the Amish Mennonites or just Amish. In later years, other schisms among Amish resulted in such groups as the Old Order Amish, New Order Amish, Kauffman Amish Mennonite, Swartzentruber Amish, Conservative Mennonite Conference and Biblical Mennonite Alliance. For instance, near the beginning of the 20th century, some members in the Amish church wanted to begin having Sunday schools and participate in progressive Protestant-style para-church evangelism. Unable to persuade the rest of the Amish, they separated and formed a number of separate groups including the Conservative Mennonite Conference. Mennonites in Canada and other countries typically have independent denominations because of the practical considerations of distance and, in some cases, language. Many times these divisions took place along family lines, with each extended family supporting its own branch.

Political rulers often admitted the Menists or Mennonites into their states because they were honest, hardworking and peaceful. When their practices upset the powerful state churches, princes would renege on exemptions for military service, or a new monarch would take power, and the Mennonites would be forced to flee again, usually leaving everything but their families behind. Often, another monarch in another state would grant them welcome, at least for a while.

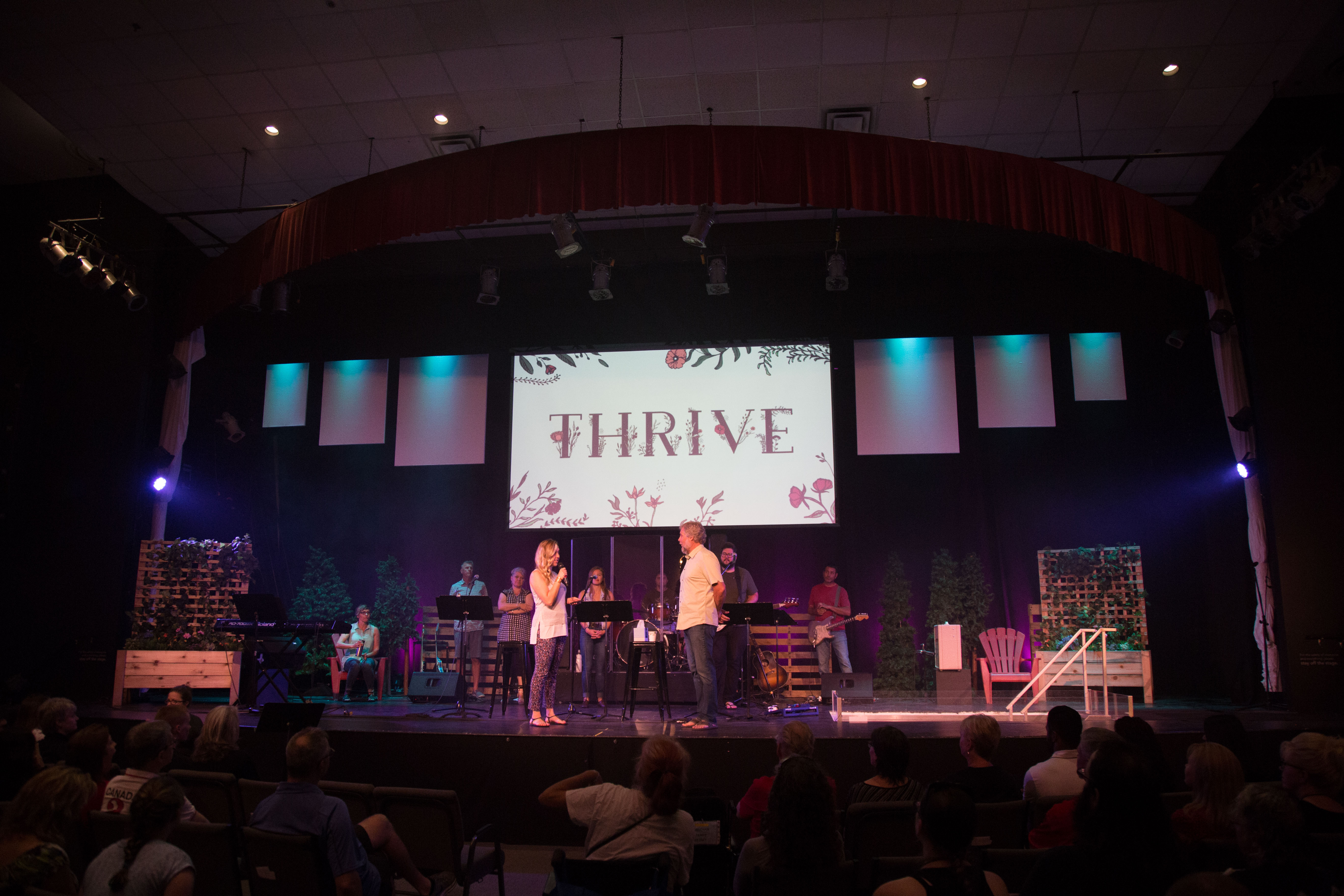
Worship service at The Meeting Place in Winnipeg, Canadian Conference of Mennonite Brethren Churches

While Mennonites in Colonial America were enjoying considerable religious freedom, their counterparts in Europe continued to struggle with persecution and temporary refuge under certain ruling monarchs. They were sometimes invited to settle in areas of poor soil that no one else could farm. By contrast, in the Netherlands, the Mennonites enjoyed a relatively high degree of tolerance. Because the land still needed to be tended, the ruler would not drive out the Mennonites but would pass laws to force them to stay, while at the same time severely limiting their freedom. Mennonites had to build their churches facing onto back streets or alleys, and they were forbidden from announcing the beginning of services with the sound of a bell.

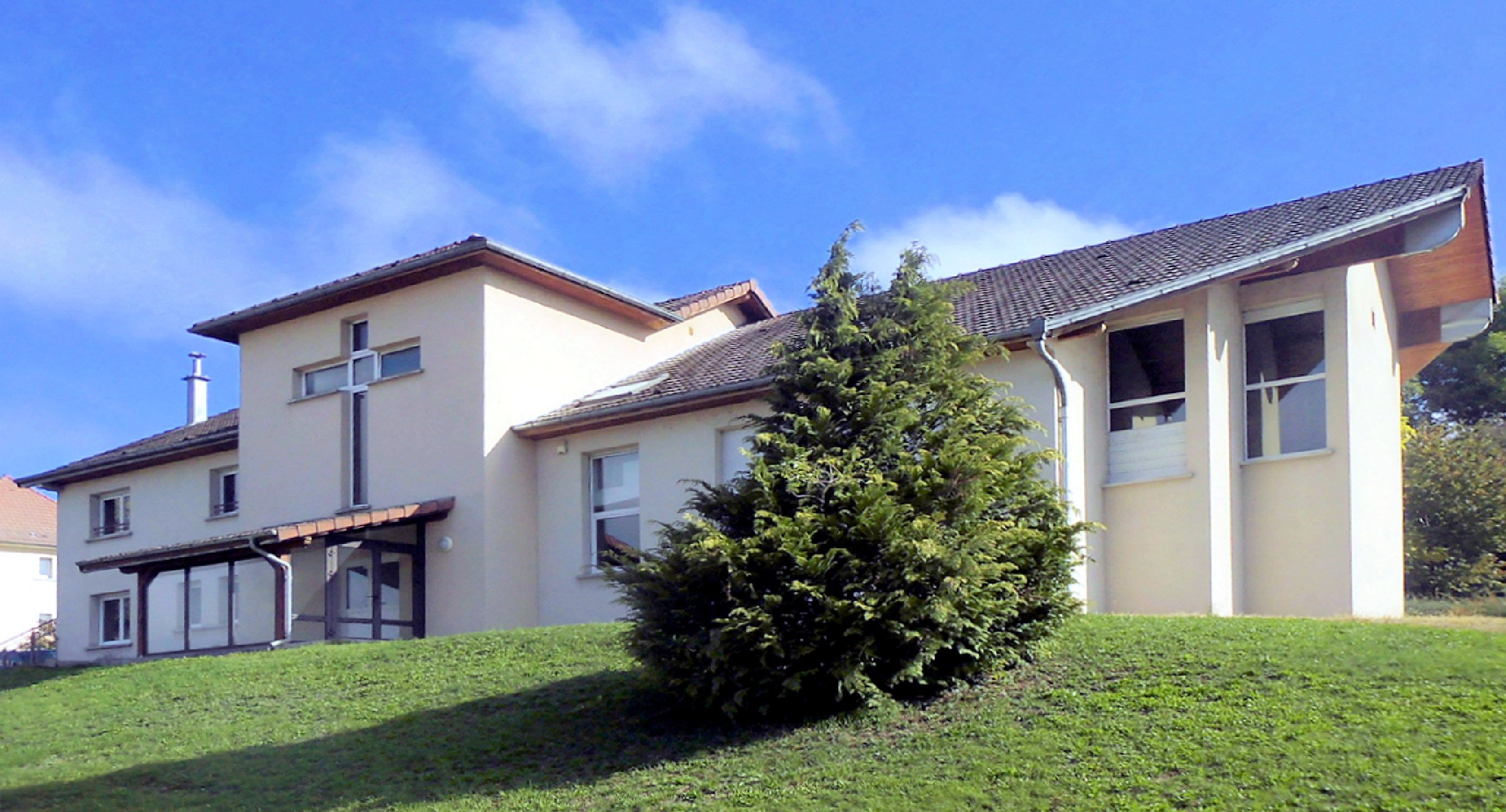
An Evangelical Mennonite Church in Altkirch

A strong emphasis on "community" was developed under these circumstances. It continues to be typical of Mennonite churches. As a result of frequently being required to give up possessions in order to retain individual freedoms, Mennonites learned to live very simply. This was reflected both in the home and at church, where their dress and their buildings were plain. The music at church, usually simple German chorales, was performed a cappella. This style of music serves as a reminder to many Mennonites of their simple lives, as well as their history as a persecuted people. Some branches of Mennonites have retained this "plain" lifestyle into modern times.

=== Statistics ===
The Mennonite World Conference was founded at the first conference in Basel, Switzerland, in 1925 to celebrate the 400th anniversary of Anabaptism. In 2025, the organization had 111 member denominations in 61 countries, and 1,45 million baptized members in 10,180 churches.

== Beliefs and practices ==
The beliefs of the movement are those of the Believers' Church.

One of the earliest expressions of Mennonite Anabaptist faith was the Schleitheim Confession, adopted on 24 February 1527. Its seven articles covered:

- The Ban (excommunication)
- Breaking of bread (Communion)
- Separation from and shunning of the abomination (the Roman Catholic Church and other "worldly" groups and practices)
- Believer's baptism
- Pastors in the church
- Renunciation of the sword (Christian pacifism)
- Renunciation of the oath (swearing as proof of truth)

The Dordrecht Confession of Faith was adopted on 21 April 1632, by Dutch Mennonites, by Alsatian Mennonites in 1660, and by North American Mennonites in 1725. It has been followed by many Mennonite groups over the centuries. With regard to salvation, Mennonites believe:

When we hear the good news of the love of God, the Holy Spirit moves us to accept the gift of salvation. God brings us into right relationship without coercion. Our response includes yielding to God's grace, placing full trust in God alone, repenting of sin, turning from evil, joining the fellowship of the redeemed, and showing forth the obedience of faith in word and deed. When we who once were God's enemies are reconciled with God through Christ, we also experience reconciliation with others, especially within the church. In baptism we publicly testify to our salvation and pledge allegiance to the one true God and to the people of God, the church. As we experience grace and the new birth, we are adopted into the family of God and become more and more transformed into the image of Christ. We thus respond in faith to Christ and seek to walk faithfully in the way of Christ.

Traditionally, Mennonites sought to continue the beliefs of early Christianity and thus practice the lovefeast (which includes footwashing, the holy kiss and communion), headcovering, nonresistance, the sharing of possessions and nonconformity to the world; these things are heavily emphasized in Old Order Mennonite and Conservative Mennonite denominations.

Seven ordinances have been taught in many traditional Mennonite churches, which include "baptism, communion, footwashing, marriage, anointing with oil, the holy kiss, and the prayer covering."

In 1911, the Mennonite church in the Netherlands (Doopsgezinde Kerk) was the first Dutch church to have a female pastor authorized; she was Anne Zernike.

There is a wide scope of worship, doctrine and traditions among Mennonites today. This section shows the main types of Mennonites as seen from North America. It is far from a specific study of all Mennonite classifications worldwide but it does show a somewhat representative sample of the complicated classifications within the Mennonite faith worldwide.

Moderate Mennonites include the largest denominations, the Mennonite Brethren and the Mennonite Church. In most forms of worship and practice, they differ very little from many Protestant congregations. There is no special form of dress and no restrictions on use of technology. Worship styles vary greatly between different congregations. There is no formal liturgy; services typically consist of singing, scripture reading, prayer and a sermon. Some churches prefer hymns and choirs; others make use of contemporary Christian music with electronic instruments. Mennonite congregations are self-supporting and appoint their own ministers. There is no requirement for ministers to be approved by the denomination, and sometimes ministers from other denominations will be appointed. A small sum, based on membership numbers, is paid to the denomination, which is used to support central functions such as the publication of newsletters and interactions with other denominations and other countries.

The distinguishing characteristics of moderate Mennonite churches tend to be ones of emphasis rather than rule. There is an emphasis on peace, community and service. However, members do not live in a separate community—they participate in the general community as "salt and light" to the world (Matthew 5:13,14). The main elements of Menno Simons's doctrine are retained but in a moderated form. Banning is rarely practiced and would, in any event, have much less effect than in those denominations where the community is more tightly knit. Excommunication can occur and was notably applied by the Mennonite Brethren to members who joined the military during the Second World War. Service in the military is generally not permitted, but service in the legal profession or law enforcement is acceptable. Outreach and help to the wider community at home and abroad is encouraged. The Mennonite Central Committee (MCC) is a leader in foreign aid provision.

Traditionally, very modest dress was expected, particularly in Conservative Mennonite circles. As the Mennonite population has become urbanized and more integrated into the wider culture, this visible difference has disappeared outside of Conservative Mennonite groups.

The Reformed Mennonite Church, with members in the United States and Canada, represents the first division in the original North American Mennonite body. Called the "First Keepers of the Old Way" by author Stephen Scott, the Reformed Mennonite Church formed in the very early 19th century. Reformed Mennonites see themselves as true followers of Menno Simons's teachings and of the teachings of the New Testament. They have no church rules, but they rely solely on the Bible as their guide. They insist on strict separation from all other forms of worship and dress in conservative plain garb that preserves 18th century Mennonite details. However, they refrain from forcing their Mennonite faith on their children, allow their children to attend public schools, and have permitted the use of automobiles. They are notable for being the church of Milton S. Hershey's mother and famous for the long and bitter ban of Robert Bear, a Pennsylvania farmer who rebelled against what he saw as dishonesty and disunity in the leadership.

The Church of God in Christ, Mennonite, a group often called Holdeman Mennonites after their founder John Holdeman, was founded from a schism in 1859. They emphasize Evangelical conversion and strict church discipline. They stay separate from other Mennonite groups because of their emphasis on the one-true-church doctrine and their use of avoidance toward their own excommunicated members. The Holdeman Mennonites do not believe that the use of modern technology is a sin in itself, but they discourage too intensive a use of the Internet and avoid television, cameras and radio. The group had 24,400 baptized members in 2013.

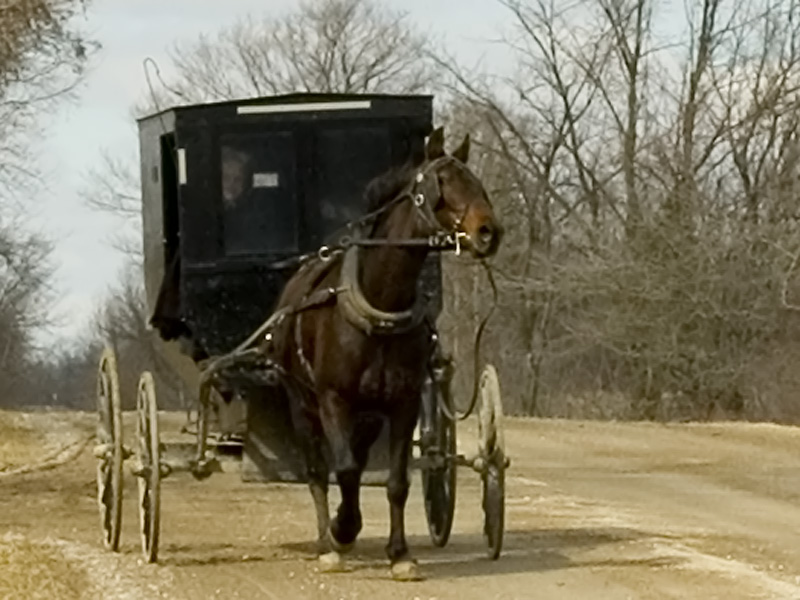
Old Order Mennonite horse and carriage

Old Order Mennonites cover several distinct groups. Some groups use horse and buggy for transportation and speak German while others drive cars and speak English. What most Old Orders share in common is conservative doctrine, dress, and traditions, common roots in 19th-century and early 20th-century schisms, and a refusal to participate in politics and other so-called "sins of the world". Most Old Order groups also school their children in Mennonite-operated schools.

- Horse and Buggy Old Order Mennonites came from the main series of Old Order schisms that began in 1872 and ended in 1901 in Ontario, Pennsylvania, and the U.S. Midwest, as conservative Mennonites fought the radical changes that the influence of 19th century American Revivalism had on Mennonite worship. Most Horse and Buggy Old Order Mennonites allow the use of tractors for farming, although some groups insist on steel-wheeled tractors to prevent tractors from being used for road transportation. Like the Stauffer or Pike Mennonites (origin 1845 in Lancaster, Pennsylvania), the Groffdale Conference, and the Old Order Mennonite Conference of Ontario, they stress separation from the world, excommunication, and the wearing of plain clothes. Some Old Order Mennonite groups are unlike the Stauffer or Pike Mennonites in that their form of the ban is less severe because the ex-communicant is not shunned, and is therefore not excluded from the family table, shunned by their spouse, or cut off from business dealings.
- Automobile Old Order Mennonites, also known as Weaverland Conference Mennonites (having their origins in the Weaverland District of the Lancaster Conference—also calling "Horning"), or Wisler Mennonites in the U.S. Midwest, or the Markham-Waterloo Mennonite Conference having its origins from the Old Order Mennonites of Ontario, Canada, also evolved from the main series of Old Order schisms from 1872 to 1901. They often share the same meeting houses with, and adhere to almost identical forms of Old Order worship as their Horse and Buggy Old Order brethren with whom they parted ways in the early 20th century. Although this group began using cars in 1927, the cars were required to be plain and painted black. The largest group of Automobile Old Orders are still known today as "Black Bumper" Mennonites because some members still paint their chrome bumpers black.

Stauffer Mennonites, or Pike Mennonites, represent one of the first and most conservative forms of North American Horse and Buggy Mennonites. They were founded in 1845, following conflicts about how to discipline children and spousal abuse by a few Mennonite Church members. They almost immediately began to split into separate churches themselves. Today these groups are among the most conservative of all Swiss Mennonites outside the Amish. They stress strict separation from "the world", adhere to "strict withdrawal from and shunning of apostate and separated members", forbid and limit cars and technology and wear plain clothing.

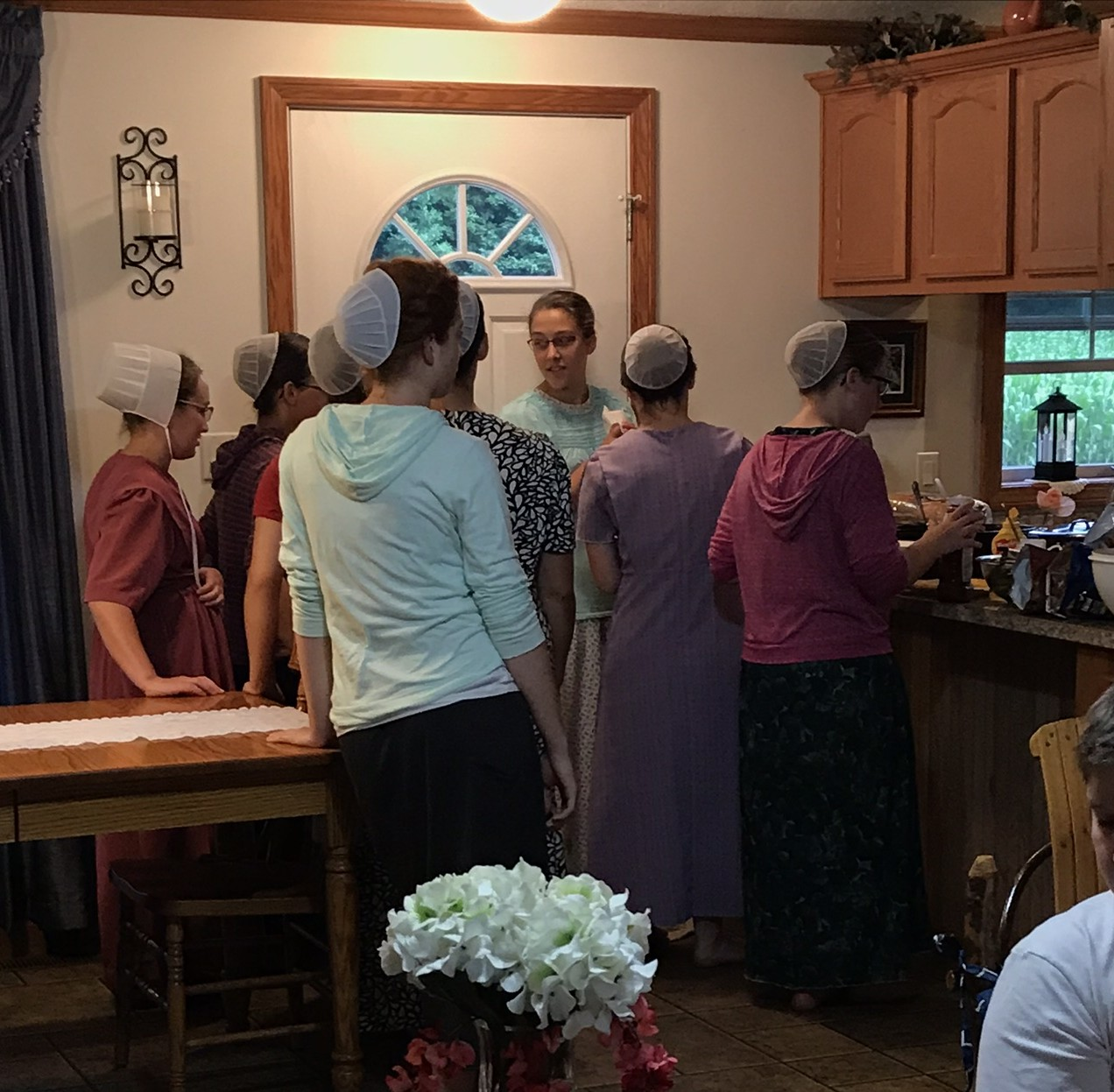
Conservative Mennonite ladies who belong to the Midwest Mennonite Fellowship at a youth group function

Conservative Mennonites are generally considered those Mennonites who maintain somewhat conservative dress, although accepting the judicious use of technology. They are not a unified group and are divided into various independent conferences and fellowships such as the Eastern Pennsylvania Mennonite Church Conference. Despite the rapid changes that precipitated the Old Order schisms in the last quarter of the 19th century, most Mennonites in the United States and Canada retained a core of traditional beliefs based on a literal interpretation of the New Testament scriptures as well as more external "plain" practices into the beginning of the 20th century. However, disagreements in the United States and Canada between conservative and progressive (i.e. less emphasis on literal interpretation of scriptures) leaders began in the first half of the 20th century and continue to some extent today.

Following World War II, a conservative movement emerged from scattered separatist groups as a reaction to the Mennonite churches drifting away from their historical traditions. "Plain" became passé as open criticisms of traditional beliefs and practices broke out in the 1950s and 1960s. The first conservative withdrawals from the progressive group began in the 1950s. These withdrawals continue to the present day in what is now the growing Conservative Movement formed from Mennonite schisms and from combinations with progressive Amish groups. While moderate and progressive Mennonite congregations have dwindled in size, the Conservative Movement congregations continue to exhibit considerable growth. Other conservative Mennonite groups descended from the former Amish-Mennonite churches which split, like the Wisler Mennonites, from the Old Order Amish in the latter part of the 19th century. (The Wisler Mennonites are a grouping descended from the Old Mennonite Church.) Other Conservative Mennonite churches descended from more recent groups that have left the Amish, like the Beachy Amish or the Tennessee Brotherhood Churches.

In North America, there are structures and traditions taught as in the Confession of Faith in a Mennonite Perspective of Mennonite Church Canada and Mennonite Church USA.

Many Progressive Mennonite churches allow LGBTQ+ members to worship as church members. In some more conservative congregations and conferences, people who identify as LGBTQ+ have been banned from membership, and leading worship. The Germantown Mennonite Church in Germantown, Pennsylvania is one example of such a progressive Mennonite church.

Most progressive Mennonite Churches place a great emphasis on the Mennonite tradition's teachings on pacifism and non-violence. Some progressive Mennonite Churches are part of moderate Mennonite denominations (such as the Mennonite Church USA) while others are independent congregations.

=== Sexuality ===
Most Mennonite denominations hold a conservative position on homosexuality.

The Brethren Mennonite Council for LGBT Interests was founded in 1976 in the United States and has member churches of different denominations in the United States and Canada.

=== Marriage ===
Most Mennonite associations in the world, such as the Biblical Mennonite Alliance and the Mennonite Christian Fellowship, only support marriage between a man and a woman.

Some Mennonite associations, such as the Mennonite Church in the Netherlands, the Mennonite Church Canada and the Mennonite Church USA allow local churches to decide about blessings of same-sex marriage.

== Russian Mennonites ==
The "Russian Mennonites" (German: "Russlandmennoniten") today are descended from Dutch Anabaptists, who came from the Netherlands and started around 1530 to settle around Danzig and in West Prussia, where they lived for about 250 years. Starting in 1791 they established colonies in the south-west of the Russian Empire and beginning in 1854 also in Volga region and Orenburg Governorate. Their ethno-language is Plautdietsch, a Germanic dialect of the East Low German group, with some Dutch admixture. Today, many traditional Russian Mennonites use Standard German in church and for reading and writing.

In the 1770s Catherine the Great of the Russian Empire acquired a great deal of land north of the Black Sea (in present-day Ukraine) following the Russo-Turkish War and the takeover of the Ottoman vassal, the Crimean Khanate. Russian government officials invited Mennonites living in the Kingdom of Prussia to farm the Ukrainian steppes depopulated by Tatar raids in exchange for religious freedom and military exemption. Over the years Mennonite farmers and businesses were very successful.

In 1854, according to the new Russian government official invitation, Mennonites from Prussia established colonies in Russia's Volga region (Am Trakt Colony), and later in Orenburg Governorate (Neu Samara Colony).

Between 1874 and 1880 some 16,000 Mennonites of approximately 45,000 left Russia. About nine thousand departed for the United States (mainly Kansas and Nebraska) and seven thousand for Canada (mainly Manitoba). In the 1920s, Russian Mennonites from Canada started to migrate to Latin America (Mexico and Paraguay), soon followed by Mennonite refugees from the Union of Soviet Socialist Republics. Further migrations of these Mennonites led to settlements in Peru, Brazil, Uruguay, Belize, Bolivia and Argentina.

By the beginning of the 20th century, the Mennonites in Russia owned large agricultural estates and some had become successful as industrial entrepreneurs in the cities, employing wage labor. After the Russian Revolution of 1917 and the Russian Civil War (1917–1921), all of these farms (whose owners were called Kulaks) and enterprises were expropriated by local peasants or the Soviet government. Beyond expropriation, Mennonites suffered severe persecution during the course of the Civil War, at the hands of workers, the Bolsheviks and, particularly, the anarchist Makhnovshchina of Nestor Makhno, who considered the Mennonites to be privileged foreigners of the upper class and targeted them. During expropriation, hundreds of Mennonite men, women and children were murdered in these attacks. After the Ukrainian–Soviet War and the takeover of Ukraine by the Soviet Bolsheviks, people who openly practiced religion were in many cases imprisoned by the Soviet government. This led to a wave of Mennonite emigration to the Americas (U.S., Canada and Paraguay).

When the German army invaded the Soviet Union in the summer of 1941 during World War II, many in the Mennonite community perceived them as liberators from the communist regime under which they had suffered. Many Russian Mennonites actively collaborated with the Nazis, including in the rounding up and extermination of their Jewish neighbors, although some also resisted them. When the tide of war turned, many of the Mennonites fled with the German army back to Germany where they were accepted as Volksdeutsche. The Soviet government believed that the Mennonites had "collectively collaborated" with the Germans. After the war, many Mennonites in the Soviet Union were forcibly relocated to Siberia and Kazakhstan. Many were sent to gulags as part of the Soviet program of mass internal deportations of various ethnic groups whose loyalty was seen as questionable. Many German-Russian Mennonites who lived to the east (not in Ukraine) were deported to Siberia before the German army's invasion and were also often placed in labor camps. In the decades that followed, as the Soviet regime became less brutal, a number of Mennonites returned to Ukraine and Western Russia where they had formerly lived. In the 1990s the governments of Kazakhstan, Russia and Ukraine gave them the opportunity to emigrate, and the vast majority emigrated to Germany. The Russian Mennonite immigrants in Germany from the 1990s outnumber the pre-1989 community of Mennonites by three to one.

By 2015, the majority of Russian Mennonites and their descendants live in Latin America, Germany and Canada.

The world's most conservative Mennonites (in terms of culture and technology) are the Mennonites affiliated with the Lower and Upper Barton Creek Colonies in Belize. Lower Barton is inhabited by Plautdietsch speaking Russian Mennonites, whereas Upper Barton Creek is mainly inhabited by Pennsylvania Dutch language-speaking Mennonites from North America. Neither group uses motors or paint.

== North America ==
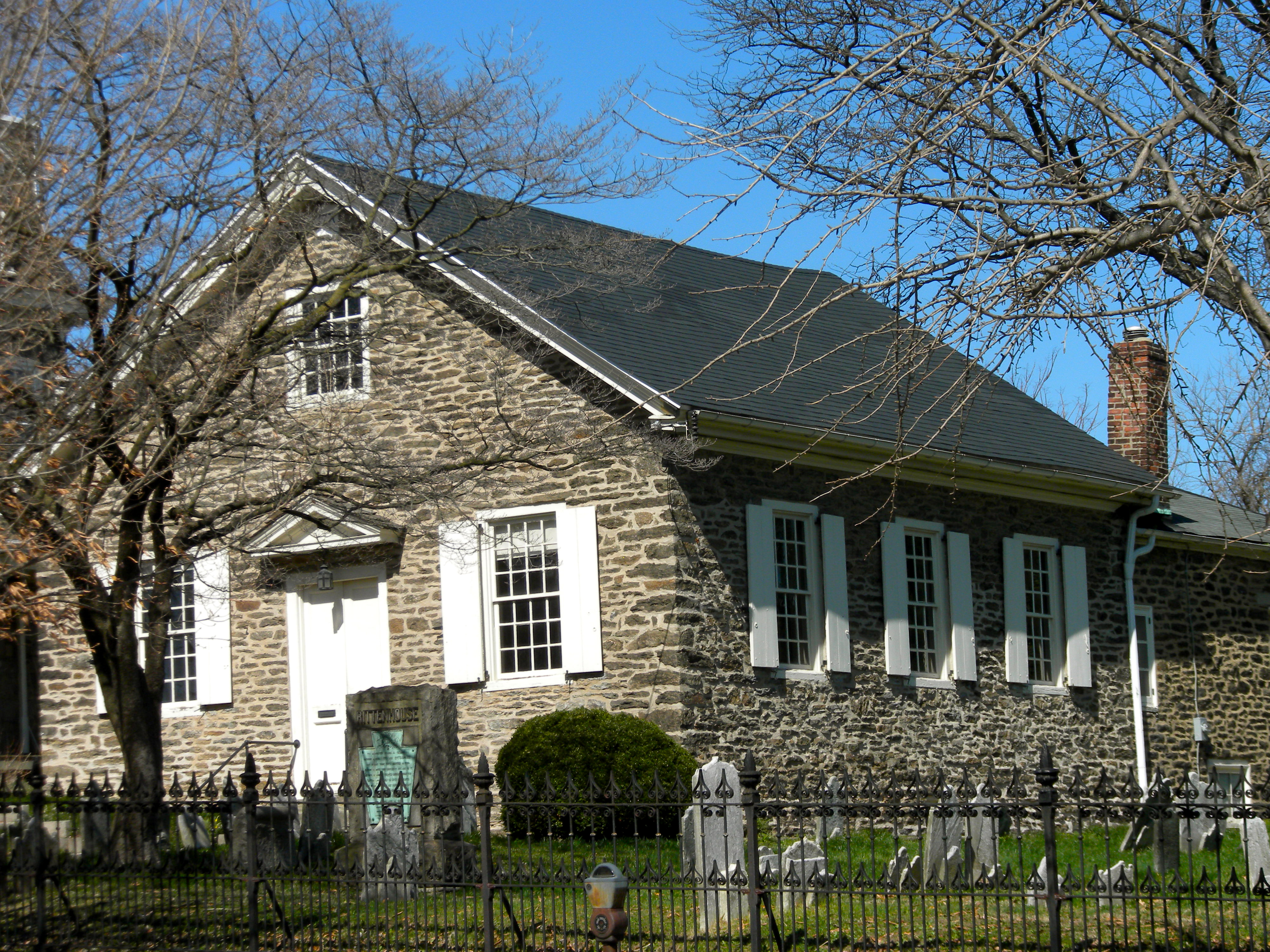
Germantown Mennonite Meetinghouse, built 1770

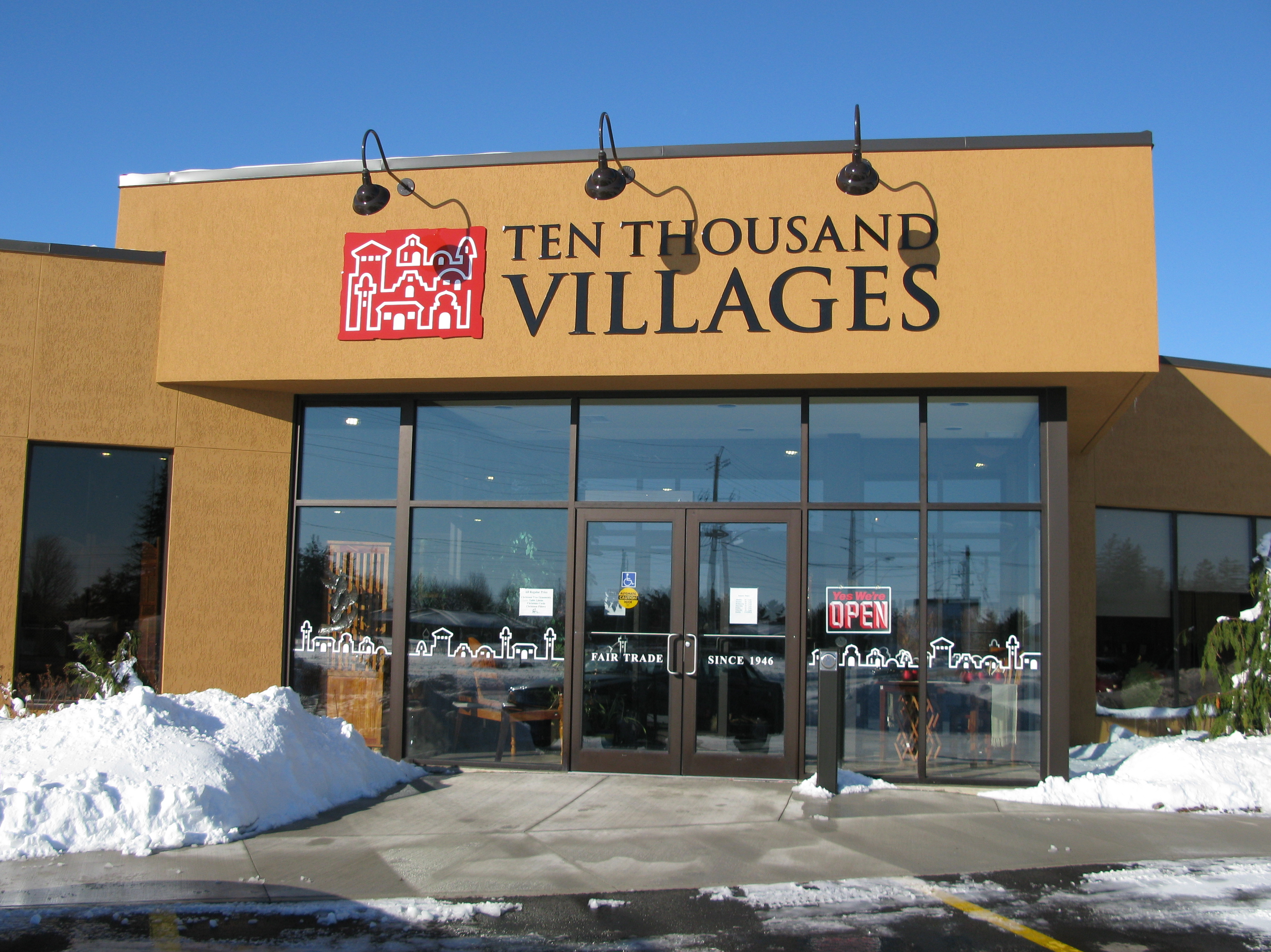
Ten Thousand Villages Store in New Hamburg, Ontario

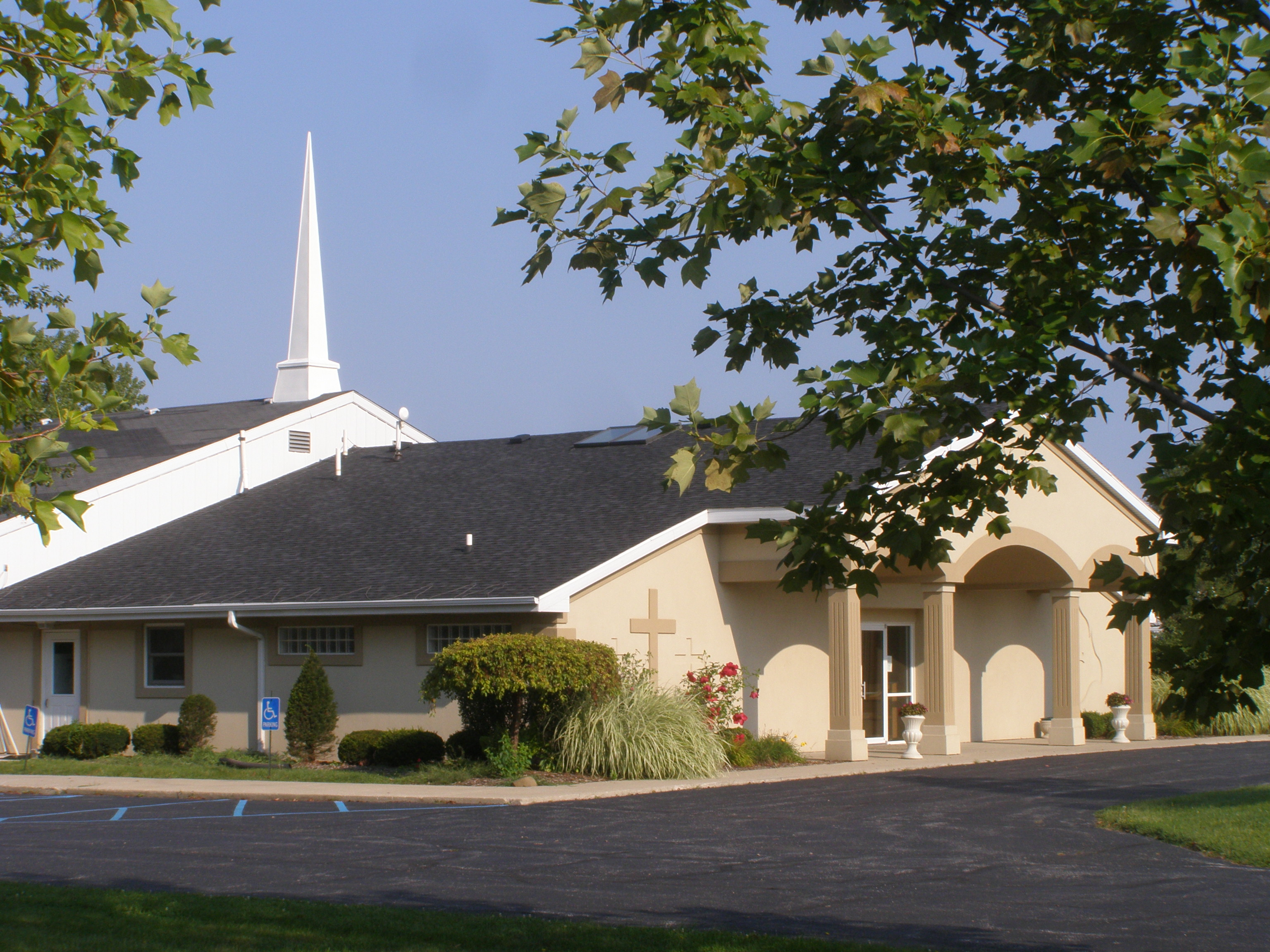
Valparaiso Mennonite Church, in Valparaiso, Indiana in the United States.

Persecution and the search for employment forced Mennonites out of the Netherlands eastward to Germany in the 17th century. As Quaker Evangelists moved into Germany they received a sympathetic audience among the larger of these German-Mennonite congregations around Krefeld, Altona, Hamburg, Gronau and Emden. It was among this group of Quakers and Mennonites, living under ongoing discrimination, that William Penn solicited settlers for his new colony. The first permanent settlement of Mennonites in the American colonies consisted of one Mennonite family and twelve Mennonite-Quaker families of German extraction who arrived from Krefeld, Germany, in 1683 and settled in Germantown, Pennsylvania. Among these early settlers was William Rittenhouse, a lay minister and owner of the first American paper mill. Jacob Gottschalk was the first bishop of this Germantown congregation. Four members of that early group of Mennonites and Mennonite-Quaker, Francis Daniel Pastorius, Abraham op den Graeff, Derick op den Graeff (both cousins to William Penn) and Garret Hendericks signed the first formal protest against slavery in the United States in 1688. The treatise was addressed to slave-holding Quakers in an effort to persuade them to change their ways.

In the early 18th century, 100,000 Germans from the Palatinate emigrated to Pennsylvania, where they became known collectively as the Pennsylvania Dutch (from the Anglicization of Deutsch, which now means German but used to mean West Germanic). The Palatinate region had been repeatedly overrun by the French in religious wars, and Queen Anne had invited the Germans to go to the British colonies. Of these immigrants, around 2,500 were Mennonites and 500 were Amish. This group settled farther west than the first group, choosing less expensive land in the Lancaster area. The oldest Mennonite meetinghouse in the United States is the Hans Herr House in West Lampeter Township. A member of this second group, Christopher Dock, authored Pedagogy, the first American monograph on education. Today, Mennonites also reside in Kishacoquillas Valley (also known as Big Valley), a valley in Huntingdon and Mifflin counties in Pennsylvania.

During Colonial America, Mennonites were distinguished from other Pennsylvania Germans in three ways: their opposition to the American Revolutionary War in which other German settlers participated on both sides; their resistance to public education; and their disapproval of religious revivalism. Contributions of Mennonites during their period include the idea of separation of church and state and opposition to slavery.

From 1812 to 1860, another wave of Mennonite immigrants settled farther west in Ohio, Indiana, Illinois and Missouri. These Swiss-German speaking Mennonites, along with Amish, came from Switzerland and Alsace-Lorraine, along with the Amish of northern New York State, formed the nucleus of the Apostolic Christian Church in the United States.

There were also Mennonite settlements in Canada from those who emigrated there chiefly from the United States (Upstate New York, Maryland, and Pennsylvania):

- Niagara region (Bertie, Willoughby, and Humberstone townships), Ontario c. 1780s – c. 1790s
- St. Jacobs, Ontario c. 1819
- Kitchener, Ontario/Waterloo, Ontario c. 1800s
- Cambridge, Ontario c. 1830s
- Markham, Ontario, c. 1800 – c. 1820s
- Stouffville, Ontario c. 1803 – c. 1805

According to a 2017 report,

"there are two basic strains of Mennonites in Canada: the Swiss-South German Mennonites came via Pennsylvania, and the Dutch-North German Mennonites came via Russia (Ukraine). In the late 1700s and early 1800s "Swiss" Mennonites from Pennsylvania settled in southern Ontario. In the 1870s, a large group of "Russian" Mennonites from Ukraine moved to southern Manitoba. Further waves of "Russian" Mennonites came to Canada in the 1920s and 1940s". In the last 50 years, Mennonites have been coming to Canada from Mexico.

During the 1880s, smaller Mennonite groups settled as far west as California, especially around the Paso Robles area.

Old Order Mennonites and Amish are often grouped together in the popular press. That is incorrect, according to a 2017 report by Canadian Mennonite magazine:

The customs of Old Order Mennonites, the Amish communities and Old Colony Mennonites have a number of similarities, but the cultural differences are significant enough so that members of one group would not feel comfortable moving to another group. The Old Order Mennonites and Amish have the same European roots and the language spoken in their homes is the same German dialect. Old Colony Mennonites use Low German, a different German dialect.

=== Moderate to progressive Mennonites ===
==== "Old" Mennonite Church (MC) ====
The Swiss-German Mennonites who immigrated to North America in the 18th and 19th centuries and settled first in Pennsylvania, then across the midwestern states (initially Ohio, Indiana, and Kansas), are the root of the former Mennonite Church denomination (MC), colloquially called the "Old Mennonite Church". This denomination had offices in Elkhart, Indiana, and was the most populous progressive Mennonite denomination before merging with the General Conference Mennonite Church (GCMC) in 2002.

==== Mennonite Brethren Church ====
The Mennonite Brethren Church was established among Plautdietsch-speaking Russian Mennonites in 1860, and has congregations in more than 20 countries, representing about 500,000 members as of 2019.

==== Mennonite Church USA ====
The Mennonite Church USA (MCUSA) and the Mennonite Church Canada are the resulting denominations of the 2002 merger of the (General Assembly) Mennonite Church and the General Conference Mennonite Church. Total membership in Mennonite Church USA denominations decreased from about 133,000, before the merger in 1998, to a total membership of 120,381 in the Mennonite Church USA in 2001. In 2013, membership had fallen to 97,737 members in 839 congregations. In 2016, it had fallen to 78,892 members after the withdrawal of the Lancaster Mennonite Conference. In May 2021 the main page of their website stated a membership of about 62,000.

Pennsylvania remains the hub of the denomination but there are also large numbers of members in Ohio, Indiana, Kansas, and Illinois.

In 1983, the General Assembly of the Mennonite Church met jointly with the General Conference Mennonite Church in Bethlehem, Pennsylvania, in celebration of 300 years in the Americas. Beginning in 1989, a series of consultations, discussions, proposals, and sessions (and a vote in 1995 in favor of merger) led to the unification of these two major North American Mennonite bodies into one denomination organized on two fronts – the Mennonite Church USA and the Mennonite Church Canada. The merger was "finalized" at a joint session in St. Louis, Missouri in 1999, and the Canadian branch moved quickly ahead. The United States branch did not complete their organization until the meeting in Nashville, Tennessee in 2001, which became effective 1 February 2002.

The merger of 1999–2002 at least partially fulfilled the desire of the founders of the General Conference Mennonite Church to create an organization under which all Mennonites could unite. Yet not all Mennonites favored the merger. The Alliance of Mennonite Evangelical Congregations represents one expression of the disappointment with the merger and the events that led up to it.

==== Mennonite Church Canada ====
Mennonite Church Canada is a conference of Mennonites in Canada, with head offices in Winnipeg, Manitoba. As of 2003, the body had about 35,000 members in 235 churches. Beginning in 1989, a series of consultations, discussions, proposals, and sessions led to the unification of two North American bodies (the Mennonite Church & General Conference Mennonite Church) and the related Canadian Conference of Mennonites in Canada into the Mennonite Church USA and the Mennonite Church Canada in 2000.

The organizational structure is divided into five regional conferences. Denominational work is administered through a board elected by the delegates to the annual assembly. MC Canada participates in the Canadian Council of Churches, the Evangelical Fellowship of Canada, and the Mennonite World Conference.

=== Conservative Mennonites ===
Conservative Mennonites include numerous groups that identify with the more conservative or traditional element among Mennonite or Anabaptist groups but not necessarily Old Order groups. The majority of Conservative Mennonite churches historically has an Amish and not a Mennonite background. They emerged mostly from the middle group between the Old Order Amish and Amish Mennonites. For more, see Amish Mennonite: Division 1850–1878.

Those identifying with this group drive automobiles, have telephones and use electricity, and some may have personal computers. They also have Sunday school, hold revival meetings, and operate their own Christian schools/parochial schools.

According to a University of Waterloo report, "of the estimated 59,000 Mennonites in Ontario, only about twenty percent are members of conservative groups". The same report estimated that "there are about 175,000 Mennonites in Canada".

=== Old Colony Mennonites ===
Old Colony Mennonites are conservative Mennonite groups who are the majority of German speaking so-called Russian Mennonites that originated in the Chortitza Colony in Russia, including the Chortitza, Reinlander, and Sommerfelder groups, which are now most common in Latin America and Canada. There are some 400,000 Russian Mennonites in the world, including children and not yet baptized young people. They should not be confused with Old Order Mennonites with whom they have some similarities.

=== Old Order Mennonites ===
The Old Order Mennonite are living a lifestyle similar to or a bit more liberal than the Old Order Amish. There were more than 27,000 adult, baptized members of Old Order Mennonites in North America and Belize in 2008/9. The total population of Old Order Mennonites groups including children and adults not yet baptized normally is two to three times larger than the number of baptized, adult members, which indicates that the population of Old Order Mennonites was roughly between 60,000 and 80,000 in 2008/9.

=== Alternative service ===
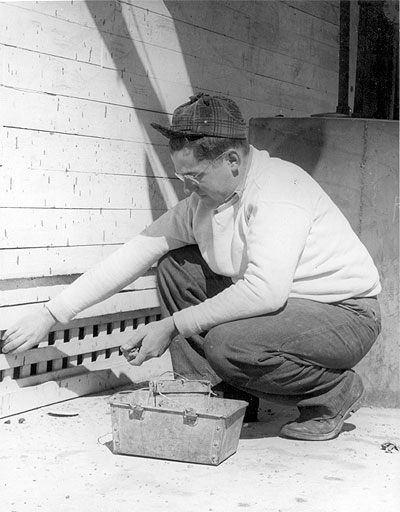
Mennonite conscientious objector Harry Lantz distributes rat poison for typhus control in Gulfport, Mississippi (1946).

During World War II, Mennonite conscientious objectors were given the options of noncombatant military service, serving in the medical or dental corps under military control, or working in parks and on roads under civilian supervision. Over 95% chose the latter and were placed in Alternative Service camps. Initially the men worked on road building, forestry and firefighting projects. After May 1943, as a labor shortage developed within the nation, men were shifted into agriculture, education and industry. The 10,700 Canadian objectors were mostly Mennonites (63%) and Doukhobors (20%).

In the United States, Civilian Public Service (CPS) provided an alternative to military service during World War II. From 1941 to 1947, 4,665 Mennonites, Amish and Brethren in Christ were among nearly 12,000 conscientious objectors who performed work of national importance in 152 CPS camps throughout the United States and Puerto Rico. The draftees worked in areas such as soil conservation, forestry, fire fighting, agriculture, social services and mental health.

The CPS men served without wages and with minimal support from the federal government. The cost of maintaining the CPS camps and providing for the needs of the men was the responsibility of their congregations and families. Mennonite Central Committee coordinated the operation of the Mennonite camps. CPS men served longer than regular draftees, not being released until well past the end of the war. Initially skeptical of the program, government agencies learned to appreciate the men's service and requested more workers from the program. CPS made significant contributions to forest fire prevention, erosion and flood control, medical science and reform of the mental health system.

=== Schisms ===
Prior to emigration to America, Anabaptists in Europe were divided between those of Dutch/North German and Swiss/South German background. At first, the Dutch/North German group took their name from Menno Simons, who led them in their early years. Later the Swiss/South German group also adopted the name "Mennonites". A third group of early Anabaptists, mainly from south-east Germany and Austria were organized by Jakob Hutter and became the Hutterites. The vast majority of Anabaptists of Swiss/South German ancestry today lives in the US and Canada, while the largest group of Dutch/North German Anabaptists are the Russian Mennonites, who live today mostly in Latin America.

A trickle of North German Mennonites began the migration to America in 1683, followed by a much larger migration of Swiss/South German Mennonites beginning in 1707. The Amish are an early split from the Swiss/South German, that occurred in 1693. Over the centuries many Amish individuals and whole churches left the Amish and became Mennonites again.

After immigration to America, many of the early Mennonites split from the main body of North American Mennonites and formed their own separate and distinct churches. The first schism in America occurred in 1778 when Bishop Christian Funk's support of the American Revolution led to his excommunication and the formation of a separate Mennonite group known as Funkites. In 1785 the Orthodox Reformed Mennonite Church was formed, and other schisms occurred into the 21st century. Many of these churches were formed as a response to deep disagreements about theology, doctrine, and church discipline as evolution both inside and outside the Mennonite faith occurred. Many of the modern churches are descended from those groups that abandoned traditional Mennonite practices.

Larger groups of Dutch/North German Mennonites came to North America from the Russian Empire after 1873, especially to Kansas and Manitoba. While the more progressive element of these Mennonites assimilated into mainstream society, the more conservative element emigrated to Latin America. Since then there has been a steady flow of Mennonite emigrants from Latin America to North America.

These historical schisms have had an influence on creating the distinct Mennonite denominations, sometimes using mild or severe shunning to show its disapproval of other Mennonite groups.

Some expelled congregations were affiliated both with the Mennonite Church and the General Conference Mennonite Church. The latter did not expel the same congregations. When these two Mennonite denominations formally completed their merger in 2002 to become the new Mennonite Church USA and Mennonite Church Canada denominations, it was still not clear, whether the congregations that were expelled from one denomination, yet included in the other, are considered to be "inside" or "outside" of the new merged denomination. Some Mennonite conferences have chosen to maintain such "disciplined" congregations as "associate" or "affiliate" congregations in the conferences, rather than to expel such congregations. In virtually every case, a dialogue continues between the disciplined congregations and the denomination, as well as their current or former conferences.

== Schools ==
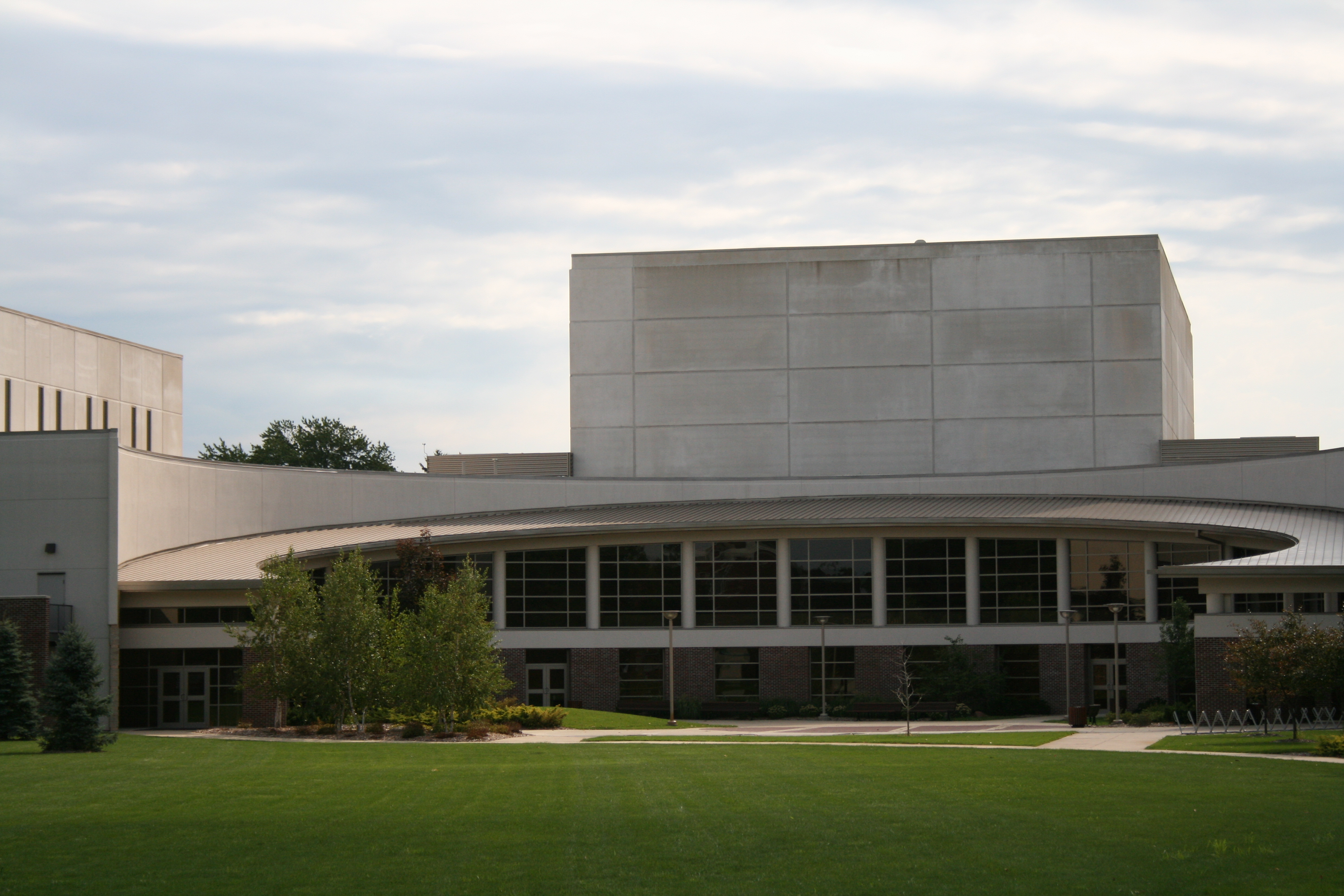
The Goshen College Music Center in Goshen, Indiana, Mennonite Church USA.

Several Mennonite groups established schools, universities and seminaries. Conservative groups, like the Holdeman, have not only their own schools, but their own curriculum and teaching staff (usually, but not exclusively, young unmarried women).

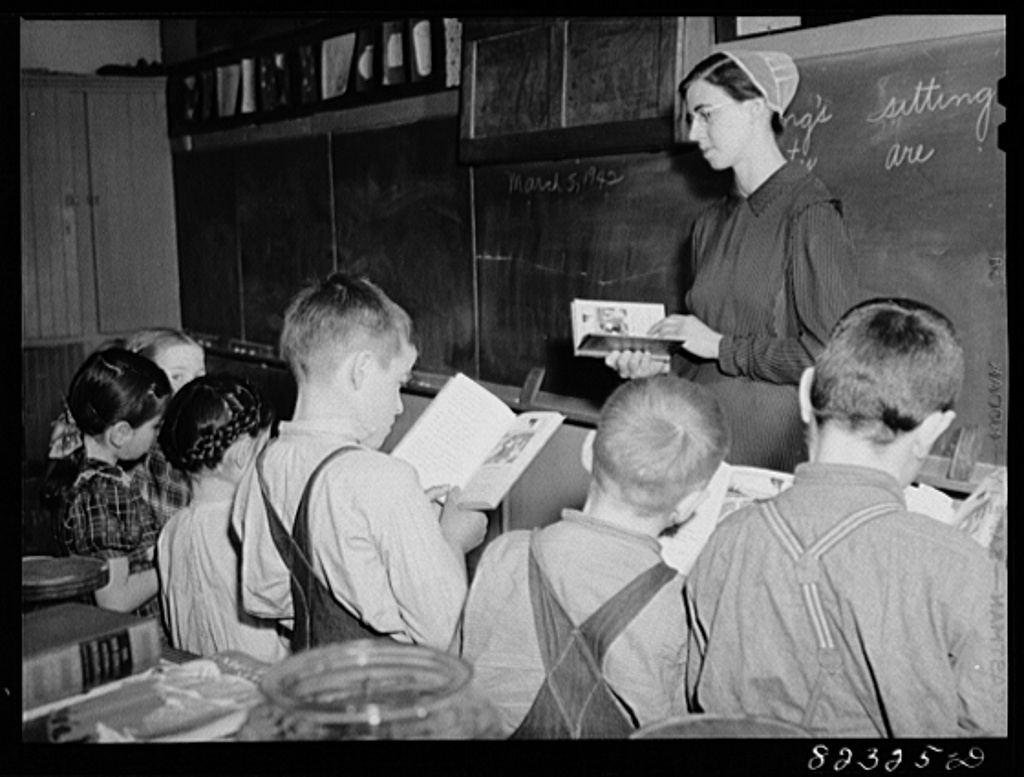
Mennonite teacher holding class in a one-room, eight-grade school house, Hinkletown, Pennsylvania, March 1942

== Ethnic Mennonites ==
Though Mennonites are a global denomination with church membership from Europe, Asia, Africa and the Americas, certain Mennonite communities that are descended from émigrés from Switzerland and Russia bear the designation of ethnic Mennonites.

In contemporary society, Mennonites are described either as a religious denomination with members of different ethnic origins, or as both an ethnic group and a religious denomination. There is controversy among Mennonites about this issue, with some insisting that they are simply a religious group, while others argue that they form a distinct ethnic group. Historians and sociologists have increasingly started to treat Mennonites as an ethno-religious group, while others have begun to challenge that perception. Discussion also exists as to the term "ethnic Mennonite"; conservative Mennonite groups, who speak Pennsylvania Dutch, Plautdietsch (Low German), or Bernese German fit well into the definition of an ethnic group, while more liberal groups and converts in developing countries do not.

== List of Mennonites surnames ==
This is a list of surnames common among Mennonites in Canada originating (indirectly) from Russia, in descending frequency. The number in brackets indicates the number of places they are higher than on a 20-entry list of surnames of Mennonites in Canada originating (indirectly) from Russia. This list only includes surnames higher on the list concerning West Prussian Mennonites than on the list of surnames of Mennonites in Canada.

- Penner (4)
- Wiens*
- Janzen (12)
- Enns (6)
- Janz*
- Froese*
- Regehr*
- Harder (8)
- Ewert*
- Pauls*
- Fast*
- Franz*
- Epp*
- Fieguth*
- Albrecht*

* name not on the 20-entry list

Surnames of Frisians include Abrahams, Arens, Behrends, Cornelius, Daniels, Dirksen, Doercksen, Frantzen, Goertzen, Gossen, Harms, Lowen, Thiessen, Petkau, Heinrichs, Jantzen, Pauls, Peters, Siemens, and Woelms. Surnames that mostly occur in Frisian congregations include Adrian, Brandt, Buller, Caspar, Flaming, Hamm, Harms, Isaak, Kettler, Kliewer, Knels, Stobbe, Teus, Töws, and Toews, additionally, Pauls, Peters, Unruh, and Fransen and Schmidt. Nickel also is a name mainly of Frisian Mennonites denomination. Unger is a name in congregation of Frisian Mennonites denomination. Foth/Vodt and Arentsen are most likely of Frisian congregations.

== Environmental impacts ==
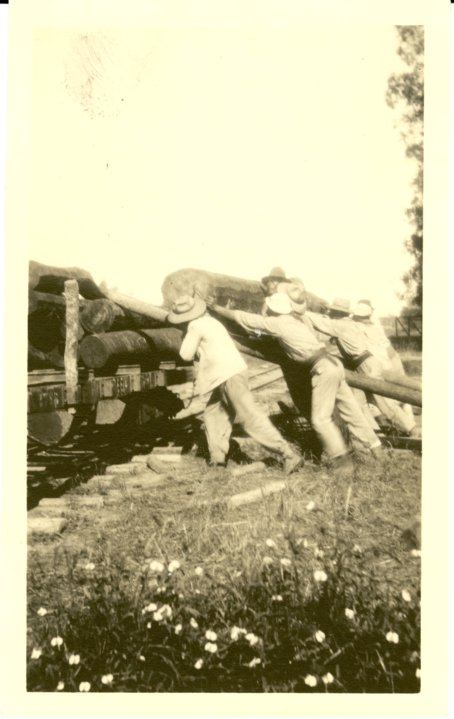
Loading logs at Puerto Casado in the Paraguayan Chaco (photograph from the H. S. Bender collection). There is a long history of American countries facilitating remote settlements of skilled and determined Mennonite farmers as a convenient way of clearing land for agriculture.

Across Latin America, Mennonite colonization has been seen as a driver of environmental damage associated with land clearance in countries including Belize, Bolivia, Colombia, Mexico, Paraguay, and Peru, while indigenous peoples in Suriname have expressed similar concerns. Since the early- to mid-twentieth century, Mennonite colonization has brought a characteristic, religious approach to cultivation (not generally found in either peasant or corporate farming) and the potential to impact a range of different biomes. Mennonite farmers have cleared large areas of wilderness (greater than the size of the Netherlands) across major transnational regions of Latin America such as the Gran Chaco, the Chiquitano, and the Amazon rainforest. In the process, they have devastated many precious natural habitats, often leading to conflict with indigenous peoples. Their commercial success in transforming previously wild lands to make way for soybean production and cattle ranching appears to have provided inspiration for others, including some conglomerates that have reproduced the model on a massive scale. While habitat destruction by Mennonite colonies has been on a smaller scale overall than that recently inflicted by a few very large corporations, the environmental damage is increasingly being contested, sometimes in the form of legal challenges.

The Monitoring of the Andean Amazon Project (MAAP), conducted by the Amazon Conservation Association, has identified Mennonite colonization as a new driver of deforestation in Bolivia and Peru. In Peru, MAAP has identified over 7,000 hectares (27 square miles) of rainforest lost to deforestation between 2017 and 2023 following the arrival of Mennonite settlers, and their colonies have been charged with illegal deforestation.

On the Yucatán Peninsula in Mexico, agricultural expansion following Mennonite settlement has been a driver of deforestation of the native tropical rainforest. In July 2018, Mexican Mennonites were fined $500,000 for unauthorized logging on 1,445 hectares (5½ square miles) of forested ejidos (shared ownership lands) in Quintana Roo.

== Controversies ==
As of 2007, the Quebec government imposed a standard curriculum on all schools (public and private). While private schools may add optional material to the compulsory curriculum, they may not replace it. The Quebec curriculum was unacceptable to the parents of the only Mennonite school in the province, as it, among other requirements, mandated the inclusion of evolution. They said they would leave Quebec after the Education Ministry threatened legal actions. The province threatened to invoke youth protection services if the Mennonite children were not registered with the Education Ministry; they either had to be home-schooled using the government-approved material, or attend a "sanctioned" school. The local population and its mayor supported the local Mennonites. The Evangelical Fellowship of Canada wrote that year to the Quebec government to express its concerns about this situation. By September 2007, some Mennonite families had already left Quebec.

Between 2005 and 2009, more than 100 girls and women in the Manitoba Colony of Bolivia were raped at night in their homes by a group of colony men who sedated them with animal anesthetic. Girls and women, including elderly women and relatives to the perpetrators, reported these attacks, but were at first dismissed as "wild female imagination", or else attributed to ghosts or demons. Eventually a group of colony men were caught in the act. The colony elders, deciding that the case was too difficult to handle themselves, called local police to take the perpetrators into custody in 2011. The youngest victim was three years old, and the oldest was 65. The offenders used a type of gas used by veterinarians to sedate animals during medical procedures. Despite long custodial sentences for the convicted men, an investigation in 2013 reported continuing cases of similar assaults and other sexual abuses. Canadian author Miriam Toews has made these crimes the center of her 2018 novel Women Talking. Connections between farmers and Mexican drug cartels in the state of Chihuahua have seen their parallels across Mexico throughout the Mexican drug war.

=== Management of sexual violence ===
In 2015, an article in the American journal Mennonite Quarterly Review stated that the rate of sexual abuse among Mennonites was at least equal to that of the general population and criticized the churches for not responding effectively to reports of sexual abuse by leaders and for not providing sufficient support to victims. Also in 2015, Mennonite Church USA adopted and published a policy on sexual misconduct to prevent abuse.

== Service projects ==
The Mennonite Disaster Service, based in North America, is a volunteer network of Anabaptist churches which provide both immediate and long-term responses to hurricanes, floods, and other disasters in the U.S. and Canada.

Mennonite Central Committee (MCC), founded on 27 September 1920, in Chicago, Illinois, provides disaster relief around the world alongside their long-term international development programs. In 1972, Mennonites in Altona, Manitoba, established the MCC Thrift Shops which has grown to become a worldwide source of assistance to the needy.

Since the latter part of the 20th century, some Mennonite groups have become more actively involved with peace and social justice issues, helping to found Christian Peacemaker Teams and Mennonite Conciliation Service.

== Membership ==
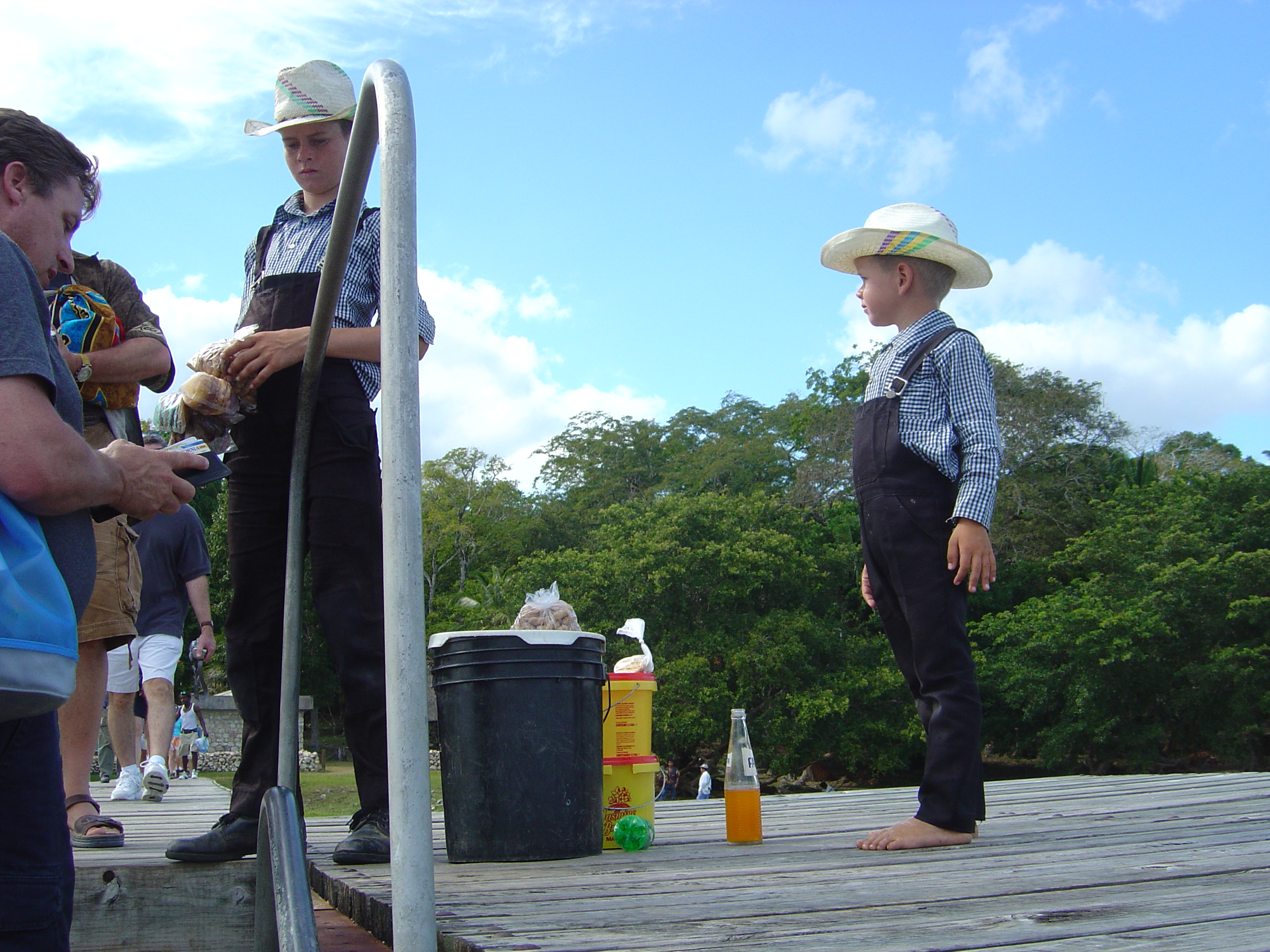
Children in an Old Order Mennonite community selling peanuts near Lamanai in Belize

According to a 2018 census by the Mennonite World Conference (MWC), it has 107 member denominations in 58 countries, and 1.47 million baptized members. Their membership in 2023 included 108 denominations from 60 countries, and around 1.45 million baptized members in over 10,180 congregations. As of 2023, 84% of baptized members in MWC member churches were African, Asian or Latin American, and 16% were located in Europe and North America.

Africa has the highest membership growth rate by far, with an increase of 10% to 12% every year, particularly in Ethiopia due to new conversions. African Mennonite churches underwent a dramatic 228% increase in membership during the 1980s and 1990s, attracting thousands of new converts in Tanzania, Kenya, and the Congo. Programs were also founded in Botswana and Swaziland during the 1960s. Mennonite organizations in South Africa, initially stifled under apartheid due to the Afrikaner government's distrust of foreign pacifist churches, have expanded substantially since 1994. In recognition of the dramatic increase in the proportion of African adherents, the Mennonite World Conference held its assembly in Bulawayo, Zimbabwe, in 2003.

In Latin America growth is not as high as in Africa, but strong because of the high birth rates of traditional Mennonites of German ancestry. Growth in Mennonite membership is steady and has outpaced total population growth in North America, the Asia/Pacific region and Caribbean region. Europe has seen a slow and accelerating decline in Mennonite membership since about 1980.

=== Organization worldwide ===
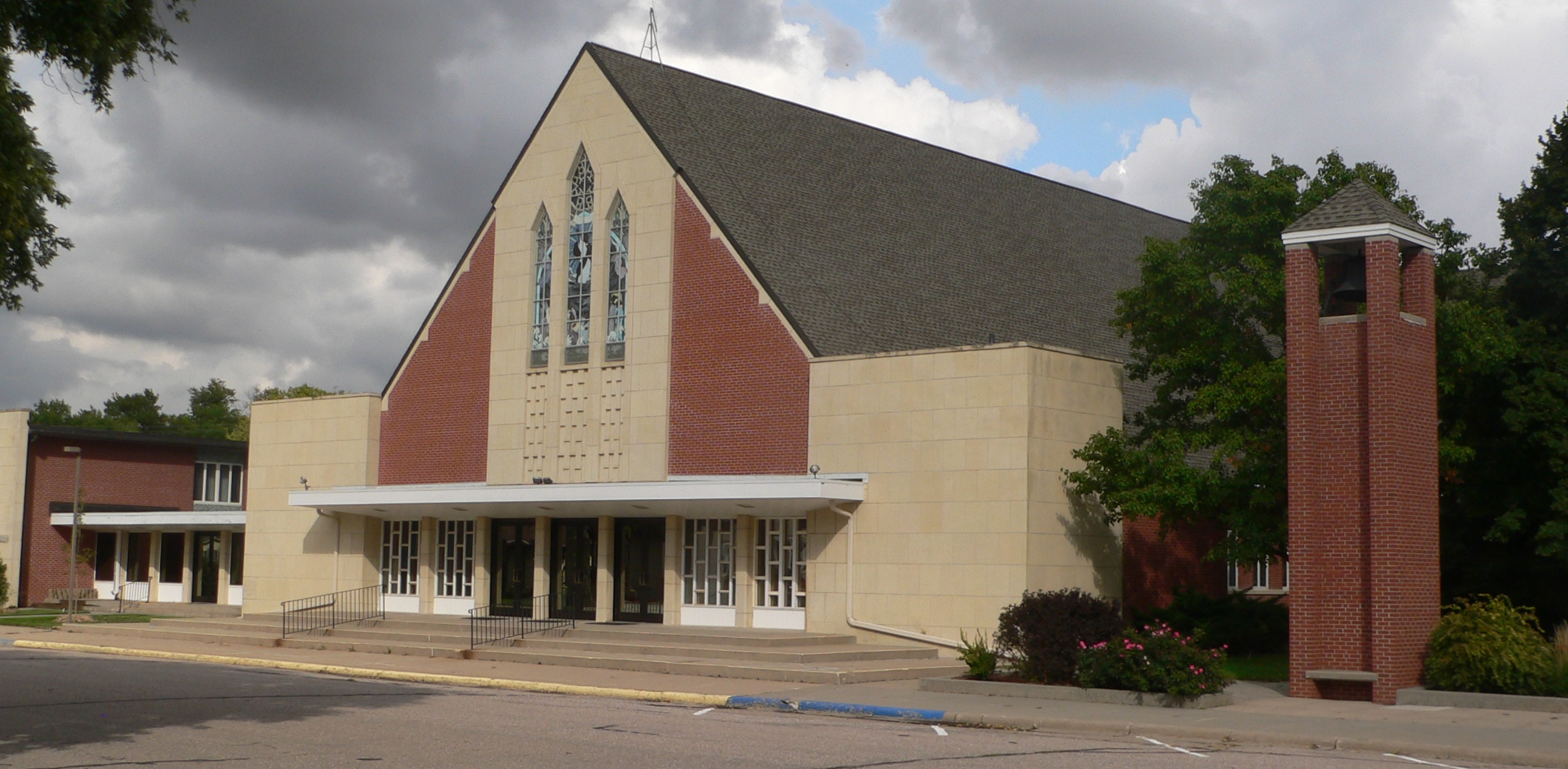
Bethesda Mennonite Church in Henderson, Nebraska, U.S.

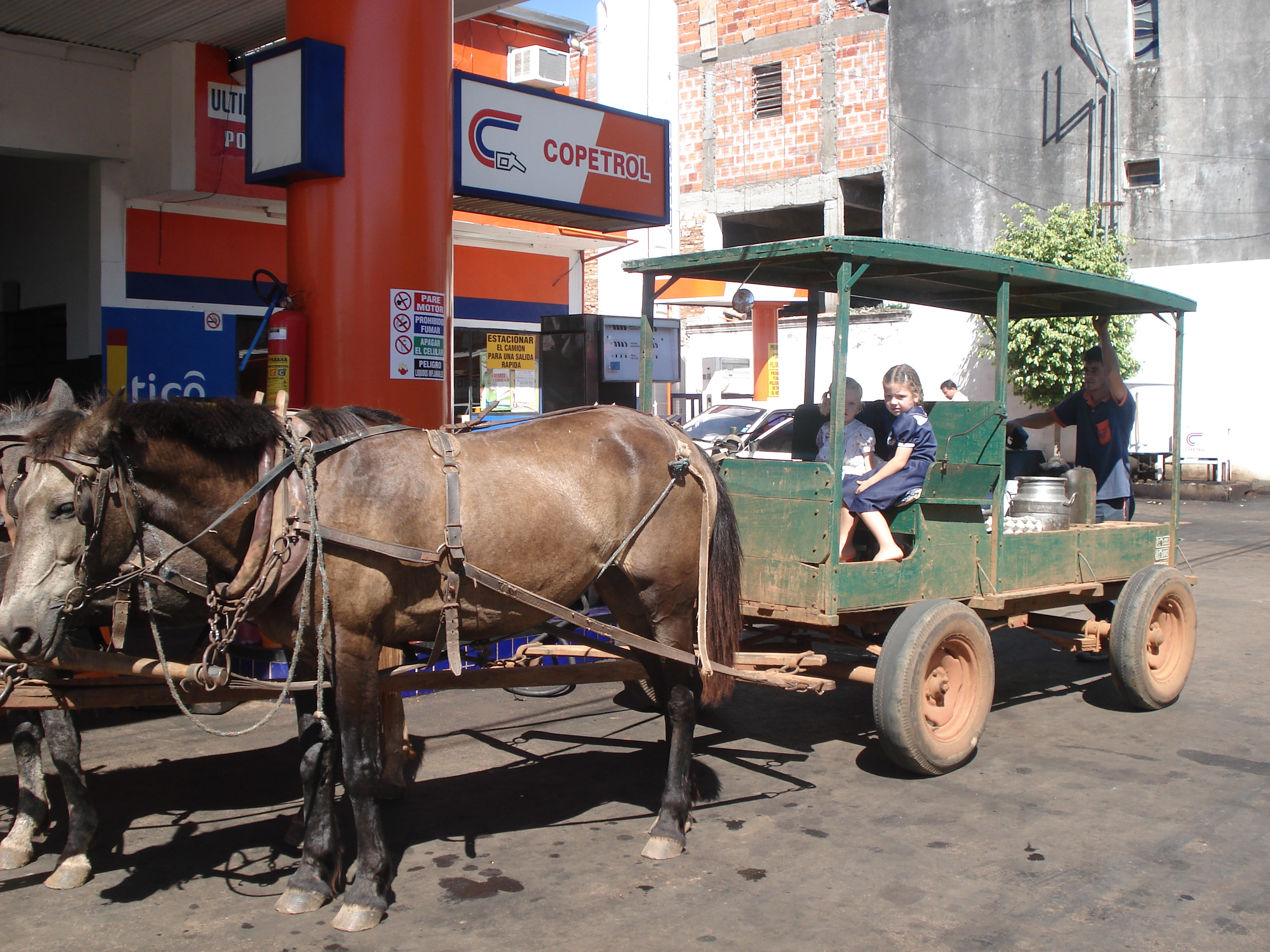
Old Order Mennonite children from San Ignacio, Paraguay.

The most basic unit of organization among Mennonites is the church. There are hundreds or thousands of Mennonite churches and groups, many of which are separate from all others. Some churches are members of regional or area conferences. And some regional or area conferences are affiliated with larger national or international conferences. There is no single world authority on among Mennonites, however there is a Mennonite World Committee (MWC) includes Mennonites from 60 countries. The MWC does not make binding decisions on behalf of members but coordinates Mennonite causes aligning with the MWC's shared convictions.

For the most part, there is a host of independent Mennonite churches along with a myriad of separate conferences with no particular responsibility to any other group. Independent churches can contain as few as fifty members or as many as 20,000 members. Similar size differences occur among separate conferences. Worship, church discipline and lifestyles vary widely between progressive, moderate, conservative, Old Order and orthodox Mennonites in a vast panoply of distinct, independent, and widely dispersed classifications. There is no central authority that claims to speak for all Mennonites, as the 20th century passed, cultural distinctiveness between Mennonite groups has decreased.

The largest Mennonite/Anabaptist groups are:

1. Mennonite Brethren (426,581 members in 2010 worldwide)
2. Old Order Amish (383,565 members in 2023 worldwide)
3. Meserete Kristos Church in Ethiopia (295,500 members in 2017; over 500,000 attendance)
4. Old Colony Mennonite Church (120,000 in the U.S., Canada, Mexico, Bolivia, Paraguay, Belize and Argentina)
5. Communauté Mennonite au Congo (86,600 members)
6. Old Order Mennonites (60,000 to 80,000 members in the U.S., Canada and Belize)
7. Mennonite Church USA (about 62,000 members in the United States)
8. Kanisa La Mennonite Tanzania (50,000 members in 240 congregations)
9. Conservative Mennonites (30,000 members in over 500 U.S. churches)
10. Mennonite Church Canada (26,000 members in 2018)
11. Church of God in Christ, Mennonite (24,400 members, of whom 14,804 (2013 data) were in U.S., 5,081 in Canada, and the remainder in Africa, Asia, Central and South America, the Caribbean, and Europe)

=== Organization: North America ===
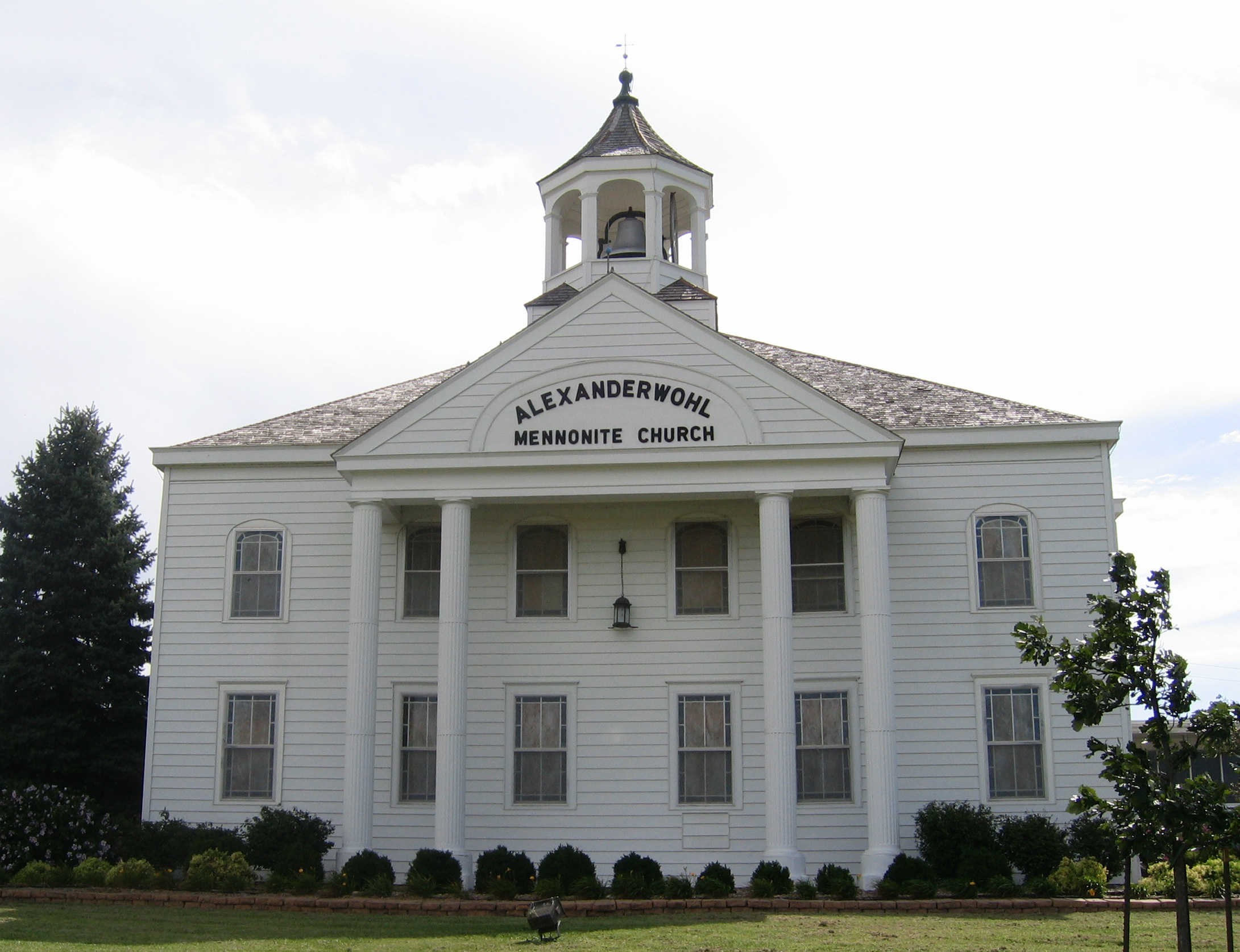
Alexanderwohl Mennonite Church in rural Goessel, Kansas

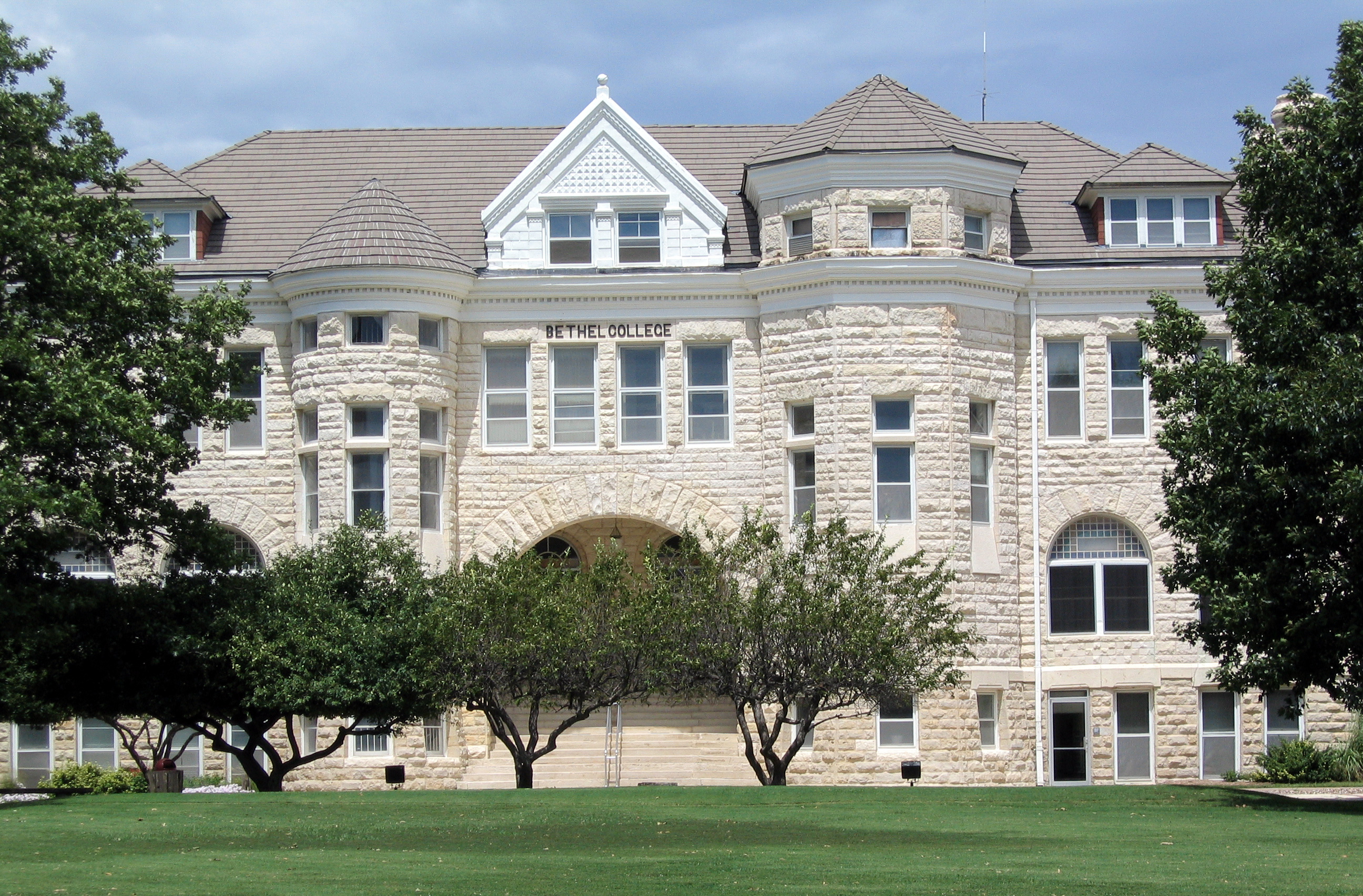
Bethel College, North Newton, Kansas

In 2015, there were 538,839 baptized members organized into 41 bodies in the United States, according to the Mennonite World Conference. The largest group of that number is the Old Order Amish. According to the Association of Religion Data Archives, in 2001 there were 80,820 Old Order Amish church members living in the United States. The U.S. Conference of Mennonite Brethren Churches comprises 34,500 members. 27,000 are part of a larger group known collectively as Old Order Mennonites. Another 78,892 of that number are from the Mennonite Church USA.

Total membership in Mennonite Church USA denominations decreased from about 133,000, before the MC-GC merger in 1998, to about 114,000 after the merger in 2003. In 2016 it had fallen to under 79,000. Membership of the Mennonite Church USA is on the decline.

Canada had 143,720 Mennonites in 16 organized bodies as of 2015. Of that number, the Canadian Conference of Mennonite Brethren Churches had 37,508 baptized members and the Mennonite Church Canada had 31,000 members.

As of 2012, there were an estimated 100,000 Old Colony Mennonites in Mexico. These Mennonites descend from a mass migration in the 1920s of roughly 6,000 Old Colony Mennonites from the Canadian provinces of Manitoba and Saskatchewan. In 1921, a Canadian Mennonite delegation arriving in Mexico received a privilegium, a promise of non-interference, from the Mexican government. This guarantee of many freedoms was the impetus that created the two original Old Colony settlements near Patos Nuevo Ideal, Durango, Cuauhtémoc, Chihuahua and La Honda, Zacatecas.

On the other hand, the Mennonite World Conference cites only 33,881 Mennonites organized into 14 bodies in Mexico.

=== Organization: Europe ===
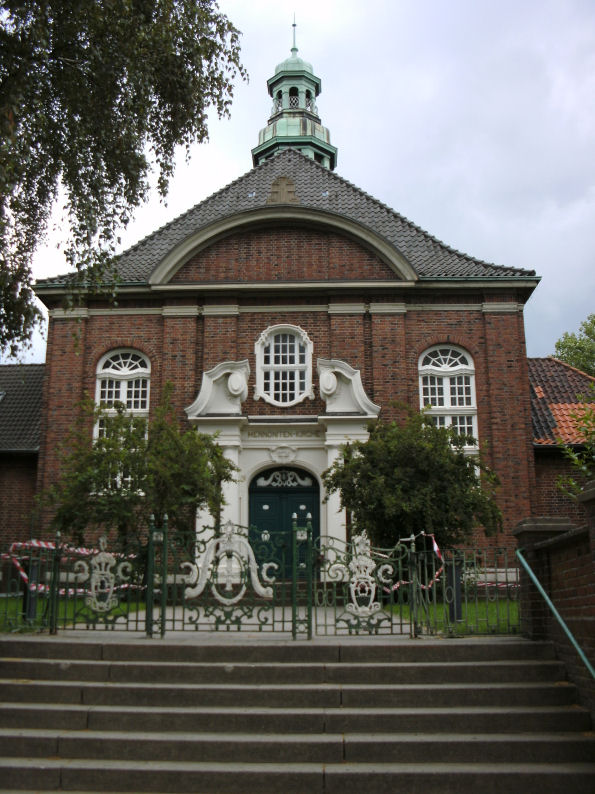
Mennonite Church in Hamburg-Altona, Germany

Germany has the largest contingent of Mennonites in Europe. The Mennonite World Conference counts 47,202 baptized members within 7 organized bodies in 2015. The largest group is the Bruderschaft der Christengemeinde in Deutschland (Mennonite Brethren), which had 20,000 members in 2010. Another such body is the Union of German Mennonite Congregations or Vereinigung der Deutschen Mennonitengemeinden. Founded in 1886, it has 27 Congregations with 5,724 members and is part of the larger "Arbeitsgemeinschaft Mennonitischer Gemeinden in Deutschland" or AMG (Assembly/Council of Mennonite Churches in Germany), which claims 40,000 overall members from various groups. Other AMG member groups include: Rußland-Deutschen Mennoniten, Mennoniten-Brüdergemeinden(Independent Mennonite Brethren congregations), WEBB-Gemeinden, and the Mennonitischen Heimatmission. However, not all German Mennonites belong to this larger AMG body. Upwards of 40,000 Mennonites emigrated from Russia to Germany starting in the 1970s.

The Mennonite presence remaining in the Netherlands, Algemene Doopsgezinde Societeit or ADS (translated as General Mennonite Society), maintains a seminary, as well as organizing relief, peace, and mission work, the latter primarily in Central Java and New Guinea. They have 121 congregations with 10,200 members according to the World Council of Churches, although the Mennonite World Conference cites only 7680 members.

Switzerland had 1800 Mennonites belonging to 14 Congregations which are part of the Konferenz der Mennoniten der Schweiz (Alttäufer), Conférence mennonite suisse (Anabaptiste) (Swiss Mennonite Conference).

In 2015, there were 2078 Mennonites in France. The country's 32 autonomous Mennonite congregations have formed the Association des Églises Évangéliques Mennonites de France.

While Ukraine was once home to tens of thousands of Mennonites, in 2015 the number totalled just 499. They are organized among three denominations: Association of Mennonite Brethren Churches of Ukraine, Church of God in Christ, Mennonite (Ukraine), and Evangelical Mennonite Churches of Ukraine (Beachy Amish Church – Ukraine).

The U.K. had but 326 members within two organized bodies as of 2015. There is the Nationwide Fellowship Churches (UK) and the larger Brethren in Christ Church United Kingdom. Additionally, there is the registered charity, The Mennonite Trust (formerly known as "London Mennonite Centre"), which seeks to promote understanding of Mennonite and Anabaptist practices and values.

== Proselytism ==
There is an organisation called Gospel Tract and Bible Society (GTBS), affiliated to Church of God in Christ, Mennonite which prints religious tracts in the US and distributes them worldwide, claiming to publish and distribut tracts in 59 languages in 149 countries. The Canadian branch spent C$745,772 on foreign activities in 2022. In some cases unwanted leaflets are distributed in, for example, a predominantly Muslim country, causing alarm.

== In popular culture ==
Mennonites have been portrayed in many areas of popular culture, especially literature, film, and television. Notable novels about or written by Mennonites include A Complicated Kindness by Miriam Toews, Peace Shall Destroy Many by Rudy Wiebe, The Salvation of Yasch Siemens by Armin Wiebe, The Russlander by Sandra Birdsell, A Year of Lesser by David Bergen, A Dream of a Woman by Casey Plett, and Once Removed by Andrew Unger. Rhoda Janzen's memoir Mennonite in a Little Black Dress was a best-seller. In 1975 Victor Davies composed the Mennonite Piano Concerto and in 1977 composer Glenn Gould featured Manitoba Mennonites in his experimental radio documentary The Quiet in the Land, part three of his Solitude Trilogy. In the 1990s, photographer Larry Towell documented the lives of Canadian and Mexican Mennonites, subsequently published in a volume by Phaidon Press. In 2007, Mexican director Carlos Reygadas directed Silent Light, the first ever feature film in the Russian Mennonite dialect of Plautdietsch. Other films depicting Mennonites include I Propose We Never See Each Other Again After Tonight, as well as All My Puny Sorrows and the Oscar-winning Women Talking, both based on Miriam Toews novels. Mennonites have also been depicted on television, including the show Pure. Mennonites have also appeared in episodes of Schitt's Creek, Letterkenny and The Simpsons; the latter of which was created by Matt Groening, himself of Russian Mennonite descent. Andrew Unger's satirical news website The Unger Review (formerly called The Daily Bonnet) pokes fun at Mennonite culture and traditions.

== See also ==
- Bible Mennonite Fellowship
- Bruderhof Communities
- Church of God in Christ, Mennonite
- Eastern Mennonite Missions
- Vincent Harding
- Guy Hershberger
- List of Mennonites
- Mennonite Church USA Archives
- Mennonite cuisine
- Mennonite denominations
- Mennonites in Argentina
- Mennonites in Belize
- Mennonites in Bolivia
- Mennonites in Mexico
- Mennonites in Paraguay
- Mennonites in Russia
- Mennonites in Uruguay
- Mennonite literature
- Mennonite settlements of Altai
- More-with-Less Cookbook
- Portrait of a Man in a Wide-Brimmed Hat
- Rot-Front, Kazakhstan
- Simple living
- Virginia Mennonite Missions

== Bibliography ==
- Penner, Nikolai (2009). The High German of Russian Mennonites in Ontario (PDF) (Thesis). Waterloo, Ontario, Canada: University of Waterloo. Archived (PDF) from the original on 31 August 2021.
- Unruh, Benjamin Heinrich, ed. (1955). Die niederländisch-niederdeutschen Hintergründe der mennonitischen Ostwanderungen im 16., 18. und 19. Jahrhundert (in German).
