= Janz =

Janz is a given name and a surname. It may refer to:

== People ==
=== Given name ===
- Janž Tulščak (? – c. 1594), Slovene Protestant preacher and writer
- Jan Janz Slop, or Jan Slob (1643–1727), Dutch Golden Age painter
- Geoff Jansz or Jeff Janz (born 1958), Sri Lankan-born Australian chef and television presenter

=== Surname ===
- Alicia Janz (born 1990), Australian rules footballer
- B. B. Janz (1877–1964), minister of the Mennonite Brethren Church
- Helmut Janz (1934-2000), German track and field athlete
- Josie Janz-Dawson (born 1988), Australian netball player
- Karin Büttner-Janz (born 1952), East German medical doctor and athlete
- Paul Janz (born 1951), Canadian musician
- Robert Janz (1932-2021), American artist
- Thiele Janz (born 1957) Mathematician

== Places ==
- Šentjanž (disambiguation), a number of municipalities in Slovenia

== Other ==
- Janz, a German firearms manufacturer

== See also ==
- Jansz or Janszoon, a number of persons
