= Pene =

Pene may refer to:

- Pene (gastropod)
- William Pène du Bois
- Raoul Pene Du Bois
- Omar Pene
- Guy Pène du Bois
- Arran Pene
- Marie-Léontine Bordes-Pène
- El Kabir Pene

== See also ==
- Penne (disambiguation)
