= Association of Mennonite Evangelical Churches in France =

Association of Mennonite Evangelical Churches in France (French: Association des églises évangéliques mennonites de France) is a Mennonite Christian association of churches in France. It is a member of the Mennonite World Conference.

== History ==
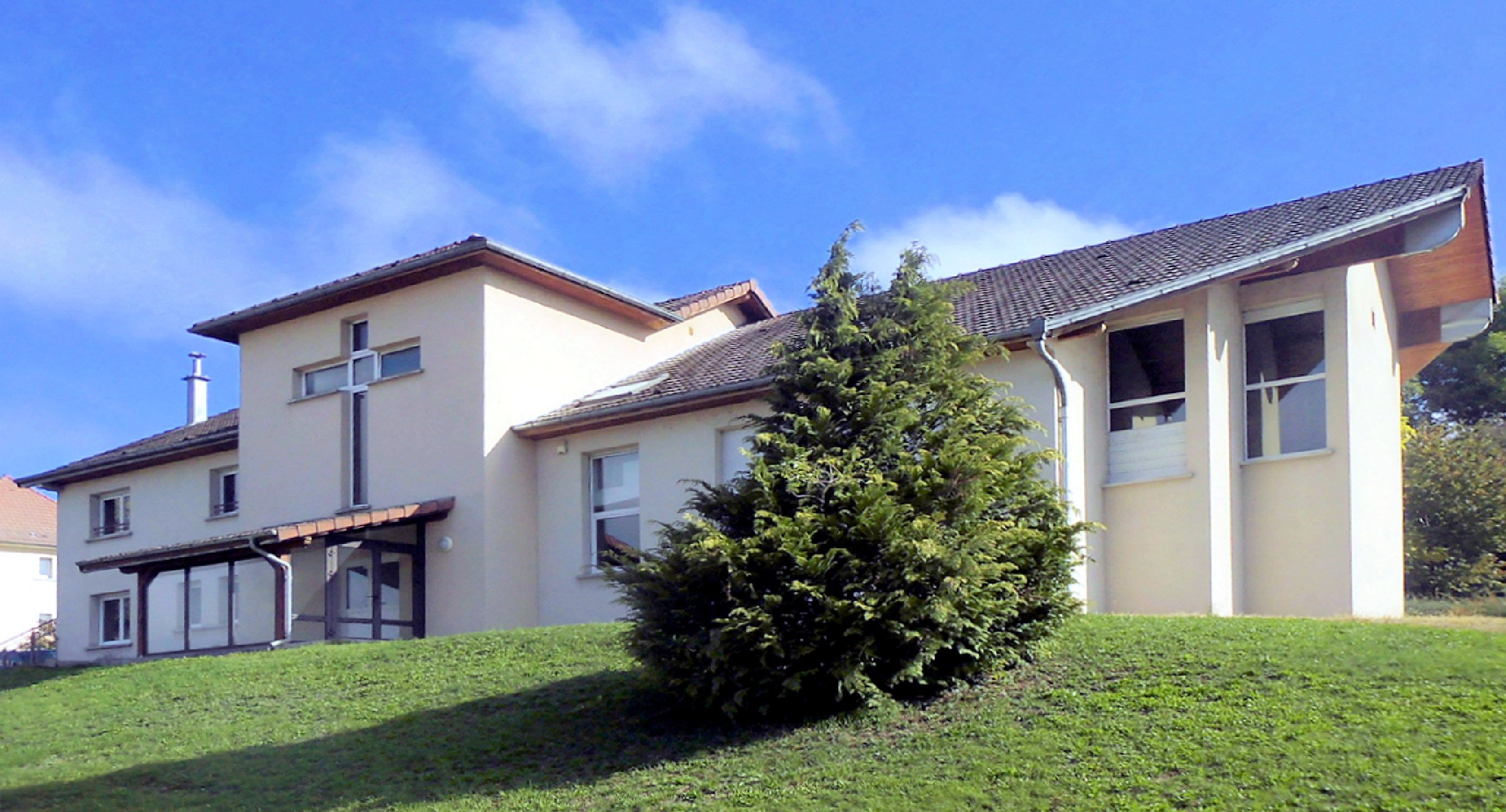
Evangelical Mennonite Church in Altkirch.

The AEEMF has its origins in two organizations, the Association of Mennonite Churches of France, founded in 1925 and the French-speaking Mennonite Churches, founded in 1928. The two organizations merged in 1980 to form the Association of Evangelical Mennonite Churches of France.

== Statistics ==
According to a census published by the association in 2022, it would have 31 churches and 2,100 members.
