= Janzen =

Janzen is a German and Dutch surname, and may refer to:

- Chantal Janzen (born 1979), Dutch actress
- Daniel H. Janzen (born 1939), American ecologist
  - Janzen–Connell hypothesis
- Femi Hollinger-Janzen (born 1993), Beninese footballer
- Hawona Sullivan Janzen, American writer, poet, and performance artist
- Henry Janzen (1940–2022), Canadian football player
- Henry L. Janzen (1845–1927), German-born nurseryman and politician in Ontario, Canada
- Jacqueline Janzen (born 1993), German ice hockey player
- Johannes Janzen (1886–1945), German WWI flying ace
- John M. Janzen (born 1937), American anthropologist
- Lee Janzen (born 1964), American golfer
- Marty Janzen (born 1973), American baseball player
- Mathilde Janzen (born 2005), German footballer
- Rhoda Janzen, American poet, academic and memoirist
- Ron Janzen (born 1994), Dutch footballer
- Russell Janzen, New York City Ballet principal dancer
- Taylor Janzen, Canadian musician

== See also ==
- Hotel Janzen, Marquette, Michigan, United States
- Janzen Jackson (born 1990), American football player
- Janzen Madsen (born 1994), New Zealand Game Developer
- Janzen–Rayleigh expansion
- Janzen v Platy Enterprises Ltd, Supreme Court of Canada decision on discrimination
- Jantzen (disambiguation)
