= Penner =

Penner may refer to:

== People ==
- Major Penner (fl. 1718), pirate captain active in the Caribbean
- A.D. Penner (1910–2008), Canadian businessman and politician
- Alden Penner (born 1983), Canadian musical artist
- Alia Penner (born c. 1985), American artist
- Andrew Penner (born 1982), Canadian ice hockey player
- Andrew Penner (musician), Canadian musician and composer
- Barbara Penner (born 1970), architectural historian
- Barry Penner (born 1966), Canadian politician
- Carrie Walton Penner (born 1970), American charter school activist and granddaughter of Walmart founder Sam Walton
- David Penner (1958–2020), Canadian architect
- Dick Penner (born 1936), English professor and songwriter
- Dustin Penner (born 1982), Canadian professional ice hockey player
- Elvin Penner (fl. 2008–2015), Belizean politician
- Fred Penner (born 1946), Canadian children's entertainer
- Gerry Penner (1934–2023), Canadian ice hockey player
- Glen Howard Penner (1940–2023), Canadian politician
- Greg Penner (born 1969), American businessman
- Hayley Gene Penner (born 1985), Canadian singer/songwriter
- Keith Penner (born 1933), Canadian public official and former politician
- Ken Penner (1896–1959), Major League Baseball player
- Jack Penner, Canadian politician
- Jacob Penner (1880–1965), Canadian socialist politician
- Jeff Penner (born 1987), Canadian ice hockey player
- Jim Penner (1939–2004), Canadian businessman and politician
- Joe Penner (1904–1941), American vaudeville comedian
- John Penner (1931–2003), Canadian politician
- Jonathan Penner (born 1962), American actor
- Jonathan Penner (writer) (born 1941), American fiction writer
- Josh Penner (born 1982), American politician
- Julie Penner (born 1976), Canadian violinist
- Michael D. Penner, Canadian lawyer and businessman
- Mike Penner (1957–2009), American sportswriter
- Miloslav Penner (1972–2020), Czech football player
- Norman Penner (1921–2009), Canadian politician
- Robert Penner, American mathematician
- Roland Penner (1924–2018), Canadian academic and politician
- Rudolph G. Penner (born 1936), Canadian-American economist
- Sarah Penner, American author
- Stanford S. Penner (1921–2016), German-American scientist and engineer
- Vernon Dubois Penner Jr. (born 1939), United States diplomat
- James Penner-Hahn (born 1957), American chemist

== Other uses ==
- Penner River, Andhra Pradesh, India
- Penner School, Winnipeg, Manitoba, Canada
- South Penner River, Tamil Nadu, India

== See also ==
- Penner v. United States, a 1970 United States Supreme Court case
- Penne (disambiguation)
