= Bible Mennonite Fellowship =

The Bible Mennonite Fellowship (BMF) is a Mennonite confederation of churches founded in 1958. There are three churches in the conference; one in Brownsville, Oregon, one in Sheridan, Oregon, and one in Woodside, Montana. The large Fairview Mennonite Church in Albany, Oregon is unofficially affiliated with the group. A small congregation in Winston, Oregon is also affiliated with, but not formally a member of the group.

BMF established missions in the Mexican states of Sonora and Zacatecas. This missionary work has been since been handed over to the Hopewell Mennonite Church.

The BMF is officially incorporated in Oregon as a tax-exempt organization.
