= Coaldale, Alberta =

Town in Alberta, Canada

Coaldale
- Town
- Town of Coaldale
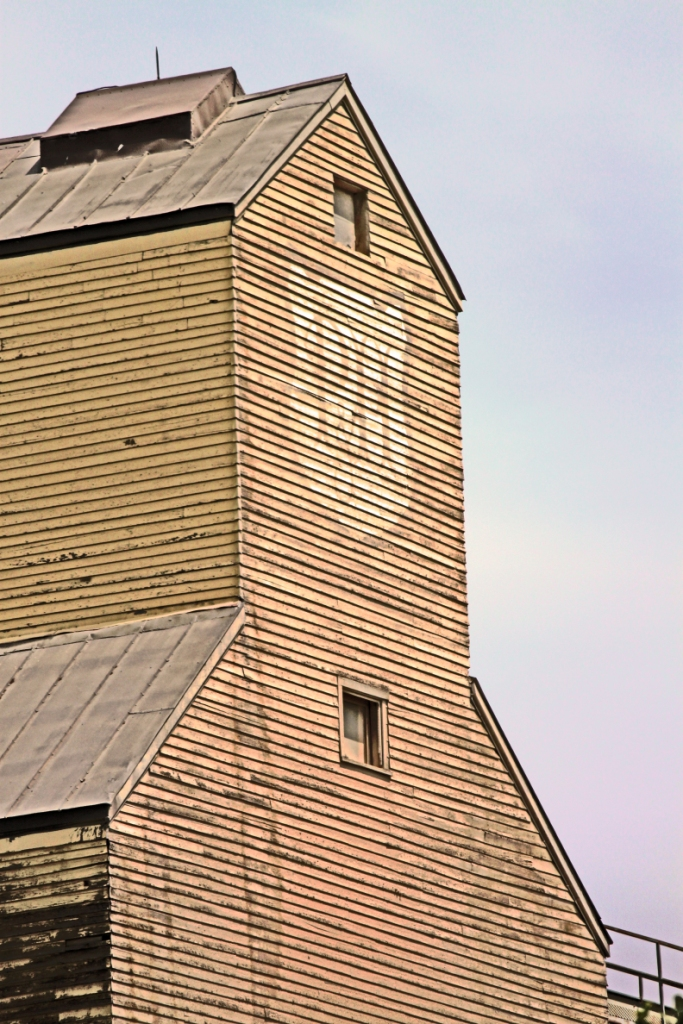
- Parrish & Heimbecker elevator along the CPR tracks.

- Flag

- Location of Coaldale in Alberta
- Coordinates: 49°43′40″N 112°37′06″W
- Country: Canada
- Province: Alberta
- Region: Southern Alberta
- Census division: 2
- Municipal district: Lethbridge County
- Incorporated
  - Village: December 27, 1919
  - Town: January 7, 1952

Government
  - Mayor: Jack Van Rijn
  - Governing body: Coaldale Town Council

Area (2021)
  - Land: 13.58 km^{2} (5.24 sq mi)
- Elevation: 863 m (2,831 ft)

Population (2021)
  - Total: 8,771
  - Density: 645.9/km^{2} (1,673/sq mi)
- Time zone: UTC−06:00 (Alberta Time)
- Forward sortation area: T1M
- Highways: Highway 3 Highway 845
- Website: www.coaldale.ca

Coaldale is a town in southern Alberta, Canada, located 11 km (6.8 mi) east of Lethbridge, along the Crowsnest Highway. Coaldale became a village in 1919 and then became incorporated as a town in 1952.

== Demographics ==
Historical population
Year	Pop.	±%
1926 (est.)	200	—
1931 (est.)	300	+50.0%
1936	255	−15.0%
1941	285	+11.8%
1946	410	+43.9%
1951	806	+96.6%
1956	2,327	+188.7%
1961	2,592	+11.4%
1966	2,541	−2.0%
1971	2,798	+10.1%
1976	3,667	+31.1%
1981	4,651	+26.8%
1986	4,796	+3.1%
1991	5,310	+10.7%
1996	5,731	+7.9%
2001	6,008	+4.8%
2006	6,177	+2.8%
2011	7,493	+21.3%
2016	8,215	+9.6%
2021	8,771	+6.8%

In the 2021 Census of Population conducted by Statistics Canada, the Town of Coaldale had a population of 8,771 living in 3,245 of its 3,343 total private dwellings, a change of 5.3% from its 2016 population of 8,331. With a land area of 13.58 km^{2} (5.24 sq mi), it had a population density of 645.9/km^{2} (1,672.8/sq mi) in 2021.

The population of the Town of Coaldale according to its 2019 municipal census is 8,691, a change of 15.5% from its 2013 municipal census population of 7,526.

In the 2016 Census of Population conducted by Statistics Canada, the Town of Coaldale recorded a population of 8,215 living in 3,007 of its 3,070 total private dwellings, a 9.6% change from its 2011 population of 7,493. With a land area of 7.99 km^{2} (3.08 sq mi), it had a population density of 1,028.2/km^{2} (2,662.9/sq mi) in 2016.

== Attractions ==
The main attractions are the Alberta Birds of Prey Centre, the Land o' Lakes Golf Course, and the Gem of the West Museum.

Chin Lakes are located 20 minutes east of Coaldale and offer such recreational services as waterskiing and campfire pits. The Indian Hills Golf Course is nine-hole golf course and is approximately 15 minutes south-west of Coaldale. Across the road is a small campground and a lake, which is commonly regarded as an ideal place for fishing.

McCain Foods has a processing plant in Coaldale, opened in 2000.

Stafford Lake is located approximately 10 minutes east of the town.

The Coaldale Copperheads, playing in the Heritage Junior Hockey League, call the Sportsplex ('The SnakePit') home and supposedly have one of the best attending home crowds in the HJHL. They relocated from Lethbridge in 2007.

The Coaldale Cobras (CMHA) are the minor hockey association in Coaldale.

Coaldale is home to six schools: R. I. Baker Middle School, Kate Andrews High School (winners of the Reach for the Top national championship in 1985), John Davidson School, St. Joseph's School, Jennie Emery Elementary School, and Coaldale Christian School. Coaldale is also expecting a new school on the northwestern part of town.

== Notable people ==
- B. B. Janz, Mennonite minister
- Joy Kogawa, Canadian author
- Kyle McLaren, NHL hockey player
- Theo Tams, Canadian Idol winner
- John E. Toews, historian
- Rudy Wiebe, Canadian author

== Politics ==
The Coaldale Town Council consists of a mayor and six councillors. The current council was elected on October 18, 2021, during the 2021 Alberta municipal elections.

Mayor

- Jack Van Rijn

Councillors

- Jacen Abrey
- Jason Beekman
- Bill Chapman
- Dale Pickering
- Lisa Reis
- Jordan Sailer

Provincially, Coaldale is within Taber-Warner and represented by United Conservative MLA Grant Hunter.

Federally, the town is represented by Conservative Rachael Thomas, MP for Lethbridge.

== See also ==
- List of communities in Alberta
- List of towns in Alberta
