= Wiens =

Wiens is a surname. Notable people with the surname include:

- Berny Wiens (born 1945), Canadian politician
- Dallas Wiens (1985-2024), American recipient of a full face transplant
- David Wiens, American cross-country mountain bike racer
- Douglas Wiens, Canadian mathematician
- Douglas A. Wiens, American geophysicist
- Edith Wiens (born 1950), Canadian opera, recital and concert singer
- Gloria Wiens, American mechanical engineer
- John Wiens, American ornithologist
- Mark Wiens (born 1986), American travel and food blogger and television host
- Nathan Wiens, Canadian naturalistic designer and woodworker
- Paul Wiens (1922–1982), German poet, translator and author
- Robert Wiens (born 1953), Canadian visual artist
- Rudolph H. Wiens, an aurora scientist
  - Wiens Peak, a peak in Antarctica named after Rudolph H. Wiens
- Rylan Wiens (born 2002), Canadian sports diver

== Fictional characters ==
- B.L.T. Wiens, fictional character in Andrew Unger's novel Once Removed

== See also ==
- Wien (Vienna)
- Wein
