= Jan Woutersz van Cuyck =

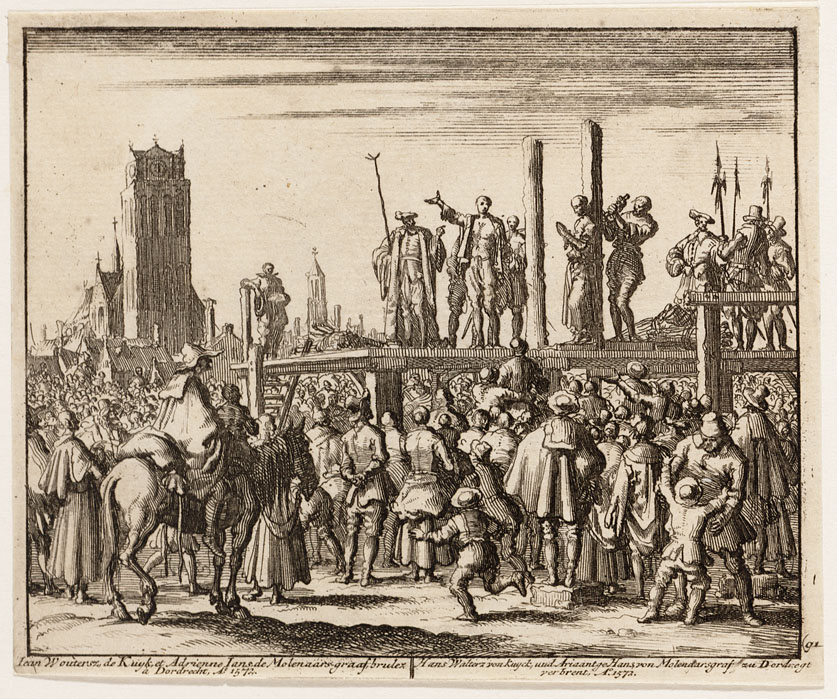
Jan Woutersz van Cuyck baring his chest to show the marks of his torture and proclaiming he speaks no evil, just before he was bound to the stake. On the right Adriaentgen Jans van Molenaarsgraaf is being strangled at the stake (strangulation before being burned was considered a more lenient punishment, and this was done to her because she was a woman). Engraving by Jan Luyken from the 1685 Martyrs Mirror.

Jan Woutersz van Cuyck (or Kuik) (ca. 1540–1572) was a Dutch Renaissance painter from Dordrecht. He became famous as a Mennonite martyr of the Protestant Reformation who was executed in 1572. His heart-rending letters from prison were published in the Martyrs Mirror.

== Biography ==
According to Houbraken he was imprisoned for his Mennonite beliefs. During his short imprisonment, he was persuaded to paint the local sheriff in the role of Solomon in an allegorical painting for the vierschaar in the city hall of Dordrecht. This painting and the story of its creation was a Dordrecht public attraction in 1712, when Houbraken was writing. Though he was the painter of the piece, this story was proved wrong a century later when archival evidence showed that the painting had already been paid for two decades earlier in 1552. It remains highly ironic however, to think that he was tried for religious crimes in the same room for which he created the main decoration.

Cuyck was burned together with another Mennonite martyr, Adriaentgen Jans van Molenaarsgraaf. He left a wife, a daughter of 7 years, and "a great rumour". His story and letters he wrote in prison were published in the Martyrs Mirror, also known as 't Bloedig Tooneel der Doopsgezinden, by Tieleman Jansz van Bracht. Houbraken quoted both Mathias Balen's Beschryvinge van Dordrecht and the Martyrs Mirror, pag. 590. and p. 628.

== Paintings ==
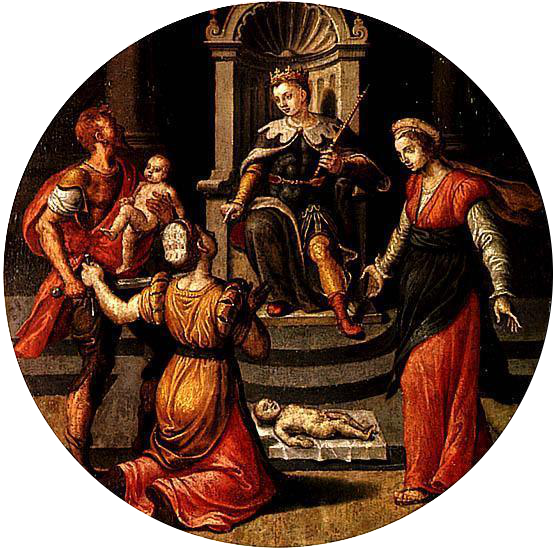
Judgment of Solomon from City Hall, Dordrecht.

His paintings have been lost for the most part, but Solomon's Judgment still remains in Dordrecht.
