= Regehr =

Regehr can be both a middle name and a surname. Notable people with the name include:

- Hulda Regehr Clark (1928–2009), Canadian naturopath and author
- Bob Regehr (1940–2019), American inventor
- Duncan Regehr (born 1952), Canadian stage, film and television actor
- Ernie Regehr, Canadian peace researcher
- John Regehr, American computer science professor
- Kaitlyn Regehr, Canadian ethnographer and broadcaster
- Richie Regehr (born 1983), Canadian ice hockey defenceman
- Robyn Regehr (born 1980), Canadian ice hockey defenceman
- Wade Regehr, Canadian neurobiology professor

== See also ==
- Reger, surname
