= Mennonite World Conference =

Anabaptist Christian denomination

- Classification: Mainline
- Orientation: Anabaptist, Mennonites
- Region: 61 countries
- Headquarters: Kitchener, Ontario, Canada
- Origin: 1925
- Congregations: 10,180
- Members: 1,45 million
- Missionary organization: Global Mission Fellowship
- Aid organization: Global Anabaptist Service Network (GASN)
- Official website: mwc-cmm.org

The Mennonite World Conference (MWC) is an international Mennonite Anabaptist Christian denomination. Its headquarters are in Kitchener, Ontario, Canada.

== History ==
The first Mennonite World Conference was held in Basel in 1925. Its main purpose was to celebrate the 400th anniversary of Anabaptism. An assembly is convened approximately every six or seven years.

Christian Neff (1863–1946), a Mennonite minister in Germany, is often called the "father" of the Mennonite World Conference. Neff, through the Conference of Mennonites in South Germany, issued the call for the first gathering in 1925, and was president of the following meetings in 1930 and 1936.

The MWC prints a quarterly news publication in three languages—Spanish (as Correo), English (Courier), and French (Courrier.) This project began in 1986. The Mennonite World Conference considers that its mission is to (1) be a global community of faith in the Anabaptist-tradition, (2) facilitate relationships between Anabaptist-related churches worldwide, and (3) relate to other Christian world communions and organizations.

The official repository of Mennonite World Conference is the Mennonite Church USA Archives.

According to a census published by the association in 2025, it would have 111 member denominations in 61 countries, and 1,45 million baptized members in 10,180 churches.

== Beliefs ==
The Conference has an Anabaptist confession of faith.

== Affiliated organizations ==
=== GMF ===
The Global Mission Fellowship (GMF) has 71 mission member organizations.

=== GASN ===
The Global Anabaptist Service Network (GASN) supports humanitarian aid projects.

== Conferences ==
| Year | Location | Conference Focus |
|---|---|---|
| 1925 | Basel, Switzerland | 400th anniversary of Anabaptism |
| 1930 | Free City of Danzig | Mennonite Relief Efforts |
| 1936 | Amsterdam and Elspeet, Netherlands | 400th anniversary of Menno Simons' conversion |
| 1948 | Goshen, Indiana, and North Newton, Kansas, United States | Relief, Nonconformity to the World, Faith and Life, Missions, Young People's Work, A Young People's Program, the Peace Testimony, Colonization, Institutions and Mennonite Life, and Christian Education |
| 1952 | Bettingen, Switzerland | The Church of Christ and Her Commission |
| 1957 | Karlsruhe, West Germany | The Gospel of Jesus Christ in the World |
| 1962 | Kitchener, Ontario, Canada | The Lordship of Christ |
| 1967 | Amsterdam, Netherlands | The Witness of the Holy Spirit |
| 1972 | Curitiba, Brazil | Jesus Christ Reconciles |
| 1978 | Wichita, Kansas, United States | The Kingdom of God in a Changing World |
| 1984 | Strasbourg, France | God's People Serve in Hope |
| 1990 | Winnipeg, Manitoba, Canada | Witnessing to Christ in Today's World |
| 1997 | Calcutta, India | Hear what the Spirit is Saying to the Churches |
| 2003 | Bulawayo, Zimbabwe | Sharing Gifts in Suffering and in Joy |
| 2009 | Asunción, Paraguay | Come together in the way of Jesus Christ |
| 2015 | Harrisburg, Pennsylvania, United States | Walking with God |
| 2022 | Salatiga, Jepara, Surakarta, Margokerto, Ungaran, Semarang, Indonesia | Following Jesus together across barriers |
