= Gloria Wiens =

American mechanical engineer

Gloria Jean Wiens is an American mechanical engineer whose varied research topics have included human–robot collaboration, parallel manipulators, foldable mechanism design for aerospace applications, MEMS sensors, and the autonomous guidance of space vehicles. She is an associate professor emerita in the Department of Mechanical and Aerospace Engineering at the University of Florida.

== Education and career ==
Wiens studied mechanical engineering at Kansas State University, receiving bachelor's and master's degrees there. She completed her Ph.D. in mechanical engineering at the University of Michigan in 1986. Her dissertation, Influence of the Kinematic Parameters on Manipulator Performance, was jointly supervised by Mohamed Zarrugh and Richard A. Scott.

She was a faculty member at Binghamton University and Auburn University before joining the University of Florida faculty in 1994. She retired as an associate professor emerita in 2023.

From 2013 to 2015, Wiens was on leave from the University of Florida, working with the support of the ASME and AAAS as a Swanson Fellow in and as assistant director for research partnerships of the US Advanced Manufacturing National Program Office. From 2016 to 2017, she was FloridaMakes director of advanced manufacturing for BRIDG, a collaboration of the University of Florida with the International Consortium for Advanced Manufacturing Research.

In addition to leading or organizing more than 40 committees and conferences, Professor Wiens has served on a number of panels, U.S.A delegations, and boards for NSF, SME, etc. to help provide guidance and review outside of the University of Florida. Her research projects have involved working with industry (Fanuc Robotics Nort America, Ford, and Lockheed Martin Corporation) and National Laboratories (AFRL, SNL, NIST, NASA/JSC, NASA/LaRc, and NASA/MSFC).

== Research and Contributions ==
Wiens' research has had a wide range of focuses. Those focuses being in robotics, intelligent systems, aerospace, and advanced manufacturing. More specifically her work has included studies in human-robot collaboration parallel manipulators, MEMS sensors, autonomous guidance systems for aerospace applications, and more.

Wiens has conducted research on human-robot collaboration in manufacturing environments, focusing on improving efficiency and safety in shared workspaces between humans and industrial robotic systems. Her work on parallel manipulators has contributed to the development and control of robotic mechanisms capable of high stiffness and precision which is helpful for advanced manufacturing and aerospace applications. Some of her other studies include the integration of microelectromechanical systems (MEMS) sensors into robotic and aerospace platforms. Additionally, Wiens has contributed to the development of intelligent control systems for space vehicle navigation by working on autonomous guidance systems for spacecraft. She has also researched foldable mechanisms designed for aerospace systems, including work on intelligent grasping for the NASA Robonaut and the development of folding mechanisms the enhance the functionality and mission capabilities of small satellites used in robotic on-orbit servicing.

== Recognition ==
Wiens was named as an ASME Fellow in 2012.
