= Pauls (surname) =

Pauls is a surname, and may refer to:

- Alan Pauls (born 1959), Argentine writer
- Ants Pauls (born 1940), Estonian politician
- Brad Pauls (born 1993), English professional boxer
- Gastón Pauls (born 1972), Argentine actor
- Johann Pauls (1908–1946), German SS concentration camp officer executed for war crimes
- Nicolás Pauls (born 1975), Argentine film and television actor
- Raimonds Pauls (born 1936), Latvian composer and piano player
