= Rhoda Janzen =

American poet, academic and memoirist

Rhoda Burton
- Born: Rhoda Marie Janzen; 1963–1964; Harvey, North Dakota
- Occupation: Poet · Author · professor

Academic background
- Education: Fresno Pacific University (B.A.); University of Florida (M.F.A.); University of California, Los Angeles (M.A.); (PhD)
- Thesis: Fair Deceivers: The Art of the Lie in Henry James (2002)
- Doctoral advisor: Stephen Yenser
- Influences: Henry James

Rhoda Marie Janzen Burton née Rhoda Marie Janzen is an American poet, academic and memoirist, best known for her memoir Mennonite in a Little Black Dress which was a finalist for a Thurber Prize for American Humor in 2010.

== Early life and education ==
Janzen grew up in a Mennonite household in North Dakota as the daughter of a Mennonite pastor. In 1984 she graduated from Fresno Pacific University with a bachelors in English literature. Following this she earned a Masters of Fine Arts in creative writing from the University of Florida in Gainesville, Florida. She went on to earn an MA and a PhD from UCLA where she wrote her dissertation on American-British author Henry James. She currently teaches at Hope College in Holland, Michigan.

== Memoirs ==
In 2006, Janzen's husband of 15 years left her and a few days later she suffered serious injuries in a car accident. While on sabbatical from her teaching position, she went home to her Mennonite family in Fresno, California, to heal from these crises. These experiences are recounted in her memoir Mennonite in a Little Black Dress.

Her second memoir, Mennonite Meets Mr. Right, tells the story of her experiences surviving breast cancer, becoming a stepmom, and attending her new husband's Pentecostal church.

In addition to her memoir, Janzen is the author of Babel's Stair, a collection of poetry.

=== Critical reception ===
Janzen's first memoir, Mennonite in a Little Black Dress, has received acclaim for its comedic elements and was a finalist for the Thurber Prize for American Humor. The response from the Mennonite community, which it satirizes, has been mixed.

Mennonite poet and scholar Di Brandt found the memoir enjoyable and humorous but criticized the tone as "consistently flippant, breezy, and almost relentlessly 'upbeat,'" for a book about what in Brandt's opinions is about the very serious topics of self-identity and midlife crisis.

In 2015, Goshen College professor, Ervin Beck, described Mennonite in a Little Black Dress and Peace Shall Destroy Many as two of the "canon of seven literary works by Mennonite authors writing about Mennonites" that "have been regarded by many Mennonite readers as offensive." Beck claimed that these works were dismissed by some critics as "transgressive" or purposefully shocking to gain popularity, but that this "transgressive canon" still serves as important work within the wider Mennonite literature movement.

== Bibliography ==
- Babel's Stair, Word Press, 2006
- Mennonite in a Little Black Dress, Henry Holt and Co., 2009
- Mennonite Meets Mr. Right, 2012
