= Šentjanž =

Šentjanž, Šent Janž, or Št. Janž, after the Slovene name for St. John, is the name of several settlements in Slovenia:

- Šent Janž pri Radljah, Municipality of Radlje
- Šentjanž nad Dravčami, Municipality of Vuzenica
- Šentjanž nad Štorami, Municipality of Štore
- Šentjanž pri Dravogradu, Municipality of Dravograd
- Šentjanž, Rečica ob Savinji, Municipality of Rečica ob Savinji
- Šentjanž, Sevnica, Municipality of Sevnica
- Orehovec, Šmarje pri Jelšah, Municipality of Šmarje pri Jelšah, known as Šent Janž pri Podčetrtku until 1955
- Vinska Gora, Municipality of Velenje, known as Šent Janž na Vinski Gori until 1955
