= Goertzen =

Goertzen is a surname. Notable people with the surname include:

- Glenda Goertzen (born 1967), Canadian writer
- Kathi Goertzen (1958–2012), American television journalist
- Kelvin Goertzen (born 1969), Canadian politician
- Mary Lou Goertzen (1929–2020), American artist
- Steven Goertzen (born 1984), Canadian ice hockey player
