= B. B. Janz =

Mennonite church minister

Benjamin B. Janz (25 September 1877 – 16 October 1964) was a minister of the Mennonite Brethren Church who was instrumental in assisting thousands of Mennonites in emigrating from the Soviet Union to Canada.

Janz was born in Konteniusfeld, Molotschna, Russian Empire, in current-day Ukraine. He was baptized into the Mennonite Brethren Church on 10 August 1897. In 1905 he married Maria Rogalsky.

Janz became a school teacher in the village of Tiege in current-day Ukraine. He became an ordained Mennonite minister in the Mennonite Brethren Church 1909. In 1920, Janz became the chair of the Union of Descendants of Dutch Lineage, the most prominent Mennonite political organization in the Soviet Union. During the famine of 1921, Janz helped negotiate permission for the entry of relief supplies from American Mennonite relief agencies. Janz was also asked by the Mennonite Brethren Church to negotiate the release of men who had been conscripted into the Red Army.

Beginning in 1922, Janz began negotiations with the Soviet government to allow emigration of Mennonites to Canada. In 1923, 3000 Mennonites emigrants left the Soviet Union largely as a result of Janz's efforts. In 1924, 5048 more emigrated. Janz remained as spokesman for the Mennonites in the Soviet Union until March 1926.

Janz and his family emigrated to Canada in 1926 when he learned from one of his Communist friends that the authorities had targeted him for arrest or assassination. Initially, Janz settled in Winnipeg, Manitoba, but in 1927 he purchased farmland in Coaldale, Alberta, where Janz became the leading Mennonite minister. Janz worked as a member of the Canadian Mennonite Board of Colonization and helped some additional Mennonites emigrate from the Soviet Union to Canada. While in Coaldale, Janz also helped found the Coaldale Bible School and the Coaldale Mennonite High School.

After World War II, Janz spent time in South America ministering to Mennonites and others who were displaced from Europe due to the war.

Janz died in Abbotsford, British Columbia, and was buried in Coaldale, Alberta. He was the father of six children.
