= Froese =

Froese is a German surname. Notable people with the surname include:

- Adam Froese (born 1991), Canadian field hockey player
- Allen Froese (born 1976), Canadian Singer and Musician; 2021 Junos nominee
- Bianca Froese-Acquaye (born 1964), German artist, author, painter, and widow of the late Edgar Froese
- Bob Froese (born 1958), Canadian ice hockey player
- Byron Froese (born 1991), Canadian ice hockey player
- Charlotte Froese Fischer (1929-2024), Canadian academic
- Deborah Froese, Canadian Mennonite writer
- Edgar Froese (1944–2015), German musician
- Elise Froese (born 2006), Canadian wheelchair basketball player
- Gayleen Froese (born 1972), Canadian writer and singer-songwriter
- Grover Froese (1916–1982), American baseball umpire
- Jacob Froese (1917–2003), Canadian politician
- Jake Froese (1925–2013), Canadian politician
- Jerome Froese (born 1970), German musician and son of the late Edgar Froese
- Kianz Froese (born 1996), Canadian soccer player
- Rainer Froese (born 1950), German scientist
- Tom Froese (born 1952), Canadian politician
