= Bob Regehr =

American inventor (1940–2019)

Bob Eugene Regehr (February 19, 1940- September 18, 2019), also known as Robert Regehr, is the inventor of the moon-walk bounce-house inflatable party attraction.

== Biography ==
Regehr was born and raised in Hutchinson, Kansas. He and his wife, Judy, patented the bounce-house castle. They formed the Bob Regehr Enterprises company and developed the amusement device as an air-inflated cushion and structure that is strong enough to support children and adults. He also owned Texaco gas and service stations.

He collected vintage cars since he was 14 years old and accumulated more than 260 in his lifetime. His car collection was featured in Hot Rod magazine in April 2009.
