= Penne (disambiguation) =

Penne is a type of pasta.

Penne or Pennes may also refer to:

== People ==
- Penne Hackforth-Jones (born 1949), Australian actress and writer
- Penne Percy Korth (born 1942), American diplomat
- Lucas de Penna or Penne (c. 1325 – c. 1390), Neapolitan jurist
- Luigi Durand de la Penne (1914–1992), Italian navy diver during World War II, later vice-admiral and politician
- María Luisa Penne (1913–2005), Puerto Rican painter, artist, printer and educator
- Matilda Penne (died 1393), English businessperson of the fourteenth century
- Harry H. Pennes (died 1963), American physician and clinical researcher

== Places ==
- Penne, Tarn, a commune in the Tarn département, France
- La Penne, a commune in the Alpes-Maritimes department, France
- Penne, Abruzzo, a town and comune in the province of Pescara in central Italy
- Penser Joch, known as Passo di Pénnes in Italian, a mountain pass in northern Italy

== Other ==
- Penne, a form of student cap in Belgium
