= Peter J. Dyck =

Canadian Mennonite relief worker and pastor

Peter J. Dyck (December 4, 1914 – January 4, 2010) was a Canadian Mennonite relief worker and pastor best known for his work resettling Russian Mennonite refugees after World War II.

== Personal history ==
Peter Dyck was born on December 4, 1914, in the Am Trakt Colony in Russia. He married Elfrieda Klassen on October 14, 1944, and they had two daughters, Ruth and Rebecca.

He emigrated from the Soviet Union in 1927 with his family. They eventually settled in Tiefengrund, Saskatchewan. He was baptized in the Tiefengrund Rosenort Mennonite Church in 1934. He graduated from Rosthern Junior College and attended the University of Saskatchewan, but dropped out to pastor several struggling local churches. In 1949 he finished his education, studying at Goshen College, Bethel College, Associated Mennonite Biblical Seminaries, and Bethel Theological Seminary in Chicago, where he earned a Master of Divinity degree in 1968.

He was called by Mennonite Central Committee (MCC) in 1941 to serve in England. There he assisted victims of World War II and met his future wife, who was serving as a nurse. Together they were asked to begin an MCC relief program for Mennonites fleeing the Soviet Union. The program was based in the Netherlands and escorted most of the refugees to Paraguay. In 1947, he was ordained as a minister of the Gospel, to give him authority in his spiritual guidance of Russian Refugees.

Upon returning to the United States, Elfrieda and Peter embarked on a speaking tour, where they presented their story and films they had made to over 100,000 people. For many Mennonites it was the first time they viewed a film in a religious setting. Audiences were thrilled by their modern-day exodus of Mennonite refugees from Berlin to the American zone of Germany, through the Soviet Occupied Zone.

He served as a pastor, alongside his wife, at Eden Mennonite Church in Kansas and Kingview Mennonite Church in Pennsylvania. He held dual membership with the Mennonite church and the General Conference Mennonite Church.

Peter served as MCC Director of Europe and North Africa from 1957 to 1967. Upon returning to the United States, Peter was the administrator of the MCC headquarters until 1981.

== Awards and honors ==
Peter was knighted by Queen Juliana of the Netherlands in 1950 for his relief work with refugees. He was awarded an Honorary Doctorate by the University of Waterloo in Ontario in 1974. He received Goshen College's Culture for Service Alumni Award in 1993.

Peter Dyck's personal papers are kept at the Mennonite Church USA Archives in Goshen, IN.
