= El Sabinal =

El Sabinal is a colony of Plautdietsch-speaking Mennonites in the Mexican state of Chihuahua founded in the 1990s. It is the most traditional colony of the so-called "Russian" Mennonites in northern Mexico, indicated by the horse and buggy transportation that is still in use there. The community speaks Low German.
