= Mennonites in Colombia =

Total population
- 3,402 members in 2020

Regions with significant populations
- Meta Department

Religions
- Anabaptist

Scriptures
- The Bible

Languages
- Spanish · Plautdietsch · Standard German · Wounaan language

Mennonites in Colombia were, until 2016, almost solely converts from the general and indigenous Colombian population to the Mennonite faith. Since then, conservative Plautdietsch-speaking ethnic Mennonites, who belong to the so-called Russian Mennonites, started to immigrate to Colombia.

Converts to the Mennonite faith are both people who speak Spanish and groups with an indigenous background, notably Embera-Wounaan. These converts do not differ much from other Protestants in Colombia.

Ethnic Mennonites have their own customs and language (Plautdietsch) and live in colonies. Conservative ethnic Mennonites normally look for a quiet and remote place where they can live according to their tradition.

== History ==
=== From Europe to America ===
Mennonites as a religious group can trace back their roots to the time of the Protestant Reformation. They belonged to the radical wing of the Reformation who tried to base its faith only on the Bible as God's word and live according to it.

Starting in 1683 (Germantown, Pennsylvania), Mennonites from Europe migrated to North America, but most came in the 18th and 19th centuries. Mainly since the second half of the 19th century they split into different groups ranging from extremely conservative to very liberal.

=== Colombia ===
Liberal and moderately conservative Mennonites engaged in worldwide missionary work like other North American Protestant denominations. In 1945 the Mennonite Brethren started missionary work among the Amerindian and general population in La Cumbre in Valle del Cauca and the corregimiento Noanama in Istmina, Chocó Department. In 1949 there were 50 believers and a missionary staff of 16 members.

The missionaries learned the indigenous language und started to write religious texts in this language. Linguistic work on the Choco languages was done by Mennonite missionary Jacob Loewen.

Mission and social work was also done by the General Conference Mennonite Church near Cachipay, Anolaima and La Mesa, all in the department of Cundinamarca and in La Esperanza in the department Norte de Santander. In 1954 there were nine missionary workers and 81 baptized converts.

In 1990 there were four Anabaptist groups working in Colombia: the Iglesia Evangélica Menonita de Colombia, that resulted from the mission work of the General Conference Mennonites, the Asociación de Iglesias de los Hermanos Menonitas, stemming from the Mennonite Brethren mission work, the Iglesia Colombiana de los Hermanos, stemming from the mission work of the Brethren Church, Ashland, Ohio, starting in 1973, and the Comunidad Cristiana Hermandad de Cristo, stemming from the Brethren in Christ, starting in 1982. The membership of these four groups in 1986 was about 2,300.

== Mennonite colonies ==
Mennonite colonies
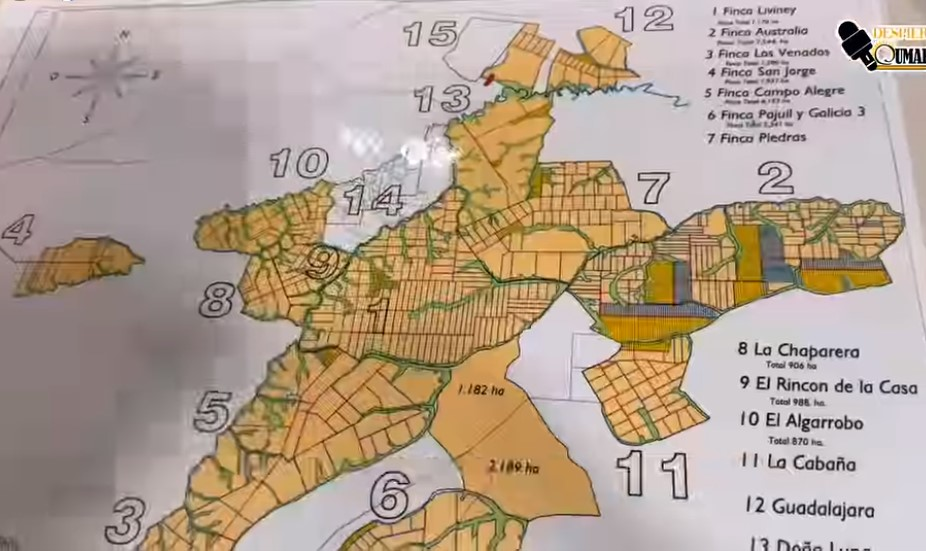
- Mennonite colonies established in Meta in 2023

Moderately conservative Mennonites of German origin started to settle in Colombia in February 2016, with immigrants coming mainly from the region around Cuauhtémoc, Chihuahua, in northern Mexico, immigrants to Liveney colony mainly from Manitoba Colony and immigrants to Australia colony mainly from Ojo de la Yegua Colony (Nordkolonie), some 50 km north of Cuauhtémoc, Mexico, but others came from the United States, Canada and Bolivia. Liviney and Australia were established fincas and the Mennonites did not change their names.

In 2018 there were three Mennonite colonies some 90 km from Puerto Gaitán, Meta Department, Liviney (also known as Los Venados) with about 7,200 hectares, Australia with about 7,000 hectares and La Florida (also known as San Jorge) with about 2,000. In 2019, there was a new Mennonite colony named Buenos Aires (also known as Pajuil). These four Mennonite colonies comprise some 28,000 ha.

These Mennonites are mostly so-called "Russian" Mennonites who formed as an ethnic group in the 19th century in what is today Ukraine. They forbid television and radio, but allow cars and many other modern technologies they need for work. They speak Plautdietsch and women dress plain. A 2020 survey found that there are more than 200 Mennonite colonies in nine Latin American countries, with four in Colombia.

== Members and congregations ==
In 2012 there were 2,825 members in 67 congregations and in 2020 there were 3,402 members in 73 congregations of Mennonites of the general Colombian population. There are no exact numbers for the Mennonites of German origin, but an estmation of the number of families was given as around 150 as of 2016 which corresponds to roughly 700 to 1000 people.
