= More-with-Less Cookbook =

Mennonite cookbook

- First edition
- Author: Doris Janzen Longacre
- Language: English
- Genre: Cookbook
- Publisher: Herald Press
- Publication date: 1976
- ISBN: 0-8361-9103-X (spiral edition), 0-8361-9263-X (paperback edition)

The More-with-Less Cookbook is a cookbook commissioned by Mennonite Central Committee in 1976 with the goal of "helping Christians respond in a caring-sharing way in a world with limited food resources" and "to challenge North Americans to consume less so others could eat enough". The first edition of the book has received forty-seven printings, with over 847,000 copies sold worldwide, including Bantam Press, British English and German editions.

The book advocates the consumption of more whole grains, legumes, fruits, vegetables, nuts and seeds, the moderation of meat and dairy products and the avoidance of processed and convenience foods. The recipes, collected from Mennonite and other Christian families around the world, are intended to be affordable, nutritious and socially and ecologically responsible.

A new 40th-anniversary edition of the book was published in 2016.

== See also ==
- Simple living
- Mennonite cuisine
