= Ewuare Osayande =

American poet, political activist, author, and lecturer

Ewuare Xola Osayande is an American poet, political activist, author, and lecturer. He currently lives in Philadelphia, PA, US.

== Overview ==
Osayande is the founder of Talking Drum Communications, co-founder and director of POWER (People Organized Working to Eradicate Racism), and creator of Project ONUS: Redefining Black Manhood. He has written 16 books and given more than 500 lectures in locations ranging from prisons to Harvard University. He was the Anti-Oppression Coordinator with Mennonite Central Committee from 2012 to 2016, as well as being the Chief Diversity Officer at the American Friends Service Committee.

== Biography ==
Ewuare X. Osayande was born in Camden, New Jersey. He became a committed social justice activist and organizer while a student at Fairleigh Dickinson University. Following the 1990 fatal shooting of Phillip Pannell Jr., a 14-year-old African American shot by a white policeman in Teaneck, New Jersey, Osayande organized protests and raised awareness about racially motivated police brutality. For more than a decade, he continued to analyze American culture and educate people of all races about the history and current reality of racism and other forms of oppression.

His work continues with POWER, an organization he co-founded with Jacqui Simmons. POWER runs workshops on racism, empowerment and politics. These programs are modeled upon the theories of anti-racist activist Wanda Lofton (1950-2002).

Early in Osayande's career he met Gwendolyn Brooks, who read his poetry and encouraged him to continue writing, self-promote, and publish his works. As a result, Osayande founded Talking Drum Communications publishing company and wrote 14 books in 16 years. Amiri Baraka wrote the introduction to Blood Luxury.

== Achievements, awards and honors ==
- (2006) Walt Whitman Arts Center's Vanguard Writer's Award
- (2005) Keynote Speaker, The Damascus Road Anti-Racism Conference
- (2005) Keynote Speaker, The Men Stopping Violence National Conference
- (2004) Keynote Speaker, The Global Climate Control Conference at Harvard University
- (2002-04) First Poet-in-Residence, African American Studies Program, Rutgers University
- (2000-03) National Coordinator, Black Radical Congress "Education Not Incarceration" campaign

== Publications ==
- (2020). Black Phoenix Uprising
- (2011). Whose America?
- (2008). Misogyny & the Emcee: Sex, Race & Hip Hop
- (2006). Art at War: Revolutionary Art Against Cultural Imperialism
- (2005). Blood Luxury
- (2005). Free the Land: Revisioning Environmentalism
- (2004). Are White Christians Anti-Racist, or do They Just Want to be Forgiven
- (2003). Black Anti-Ballistic Missives: Resisting War/Resisting Racism
- (2001). 9/11: Riots in the Sky
- (2001). Caught at the Crossroads Without a Map
- (2000). Crucifixions in the Street: Race, Rap & Religion
- (1999). So the Spoken Word Won't Be Broken: The Politics of the New Black Poetry
- (1997). Gangsta Rap is Dead
- (1996). Akoben: A Call to Action, Responding to the Ramifications of Racism in Black America
- (1993). Kwanzaa: A Biblical Perspective (co-authored with J. E. Price)
- (1992). Malcolm X: The Man or the Image

=== Poems and essays in other publications ===
- (2024). "Fahrenheit 1492" in Encounters with James Baldwin: Celebrating 100 Years.
- (2007). Men Speak Out: Profeminist Views on Gender, Sex and Power
- (2007). The Revolution Will Not Be Funded: Beyond the Non-Profit Industrial Complex
- (2007). This Poem is Sponsored By: A Collection of Critical Poetry by Corporate Watch
- (2007). What Lies Beneath: Katrina, Race and the State of the Nation
- (2003). "War Is the Enemy of the Poor: King Spoke the Truth About War. We Must Do the Same Today." The Other Side January 1, 2003. Vol 39; Issue 1, p. 36 (3).
