= Neu Samara =

Coordinates: 52°50′59.43″N 53°28′56.34″E

Neu Samara was a colony of Plautdietsch-speaking Mennonites in the Orenburg region of Russia.

== History ==
=== Founding and early history ===
Neu Samara was founded by Mennonite settlers of Plautdietsch language, culture and ancestry in 1891-92 who came from the Molotschna mother colony on the Sea of Azov in Russian Empire. Initially twelve villages were founded: Kamenetz, Pleschanowo, Krassikowo, Kaltan, Lugowsk, Podolsk, Donskoj, Dolinsk, Jugowka, Klinok, Kuterlja, Bogomasowo. About 500 families totaling 2,600 individuals made up the initial settlement. Later three additional villages were formed: Annenskoje, Wladimirowka and Ischalka. In the 1950s Annenskoje, Kamenetz and Wladimirowka were dissolved.

=== Soviet era ===
All aspects of life in Neu Samara were "disrupted and bedevilled by war and the revolution, famine, collectivization, and terror" when it was part of the Soviet Union.
