= Mennonite cuisine =

Foods of Mennonite communities

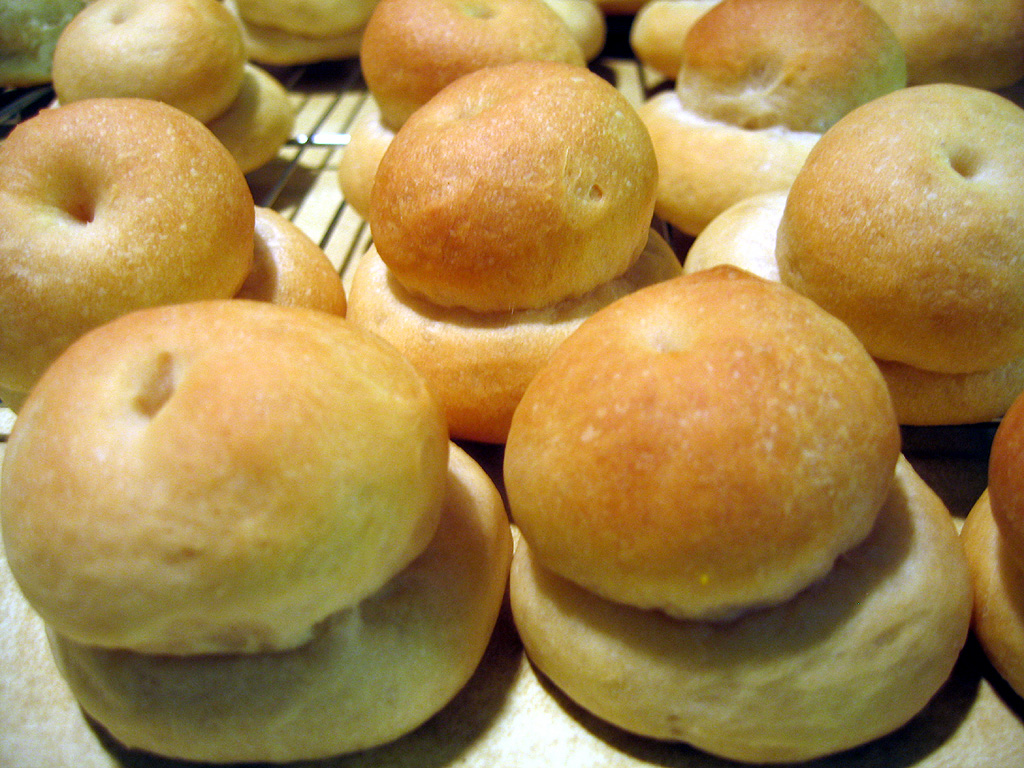
Russian Mennonite zwieback

Mennonite cuisine is food associated with Mennonites, members of Christian denominations that came out of the Anabaptist movement in sixteenth-century Switzerland and Netherlands. Because of persecution and discrimination against their close-knit communities, they migrated to Prussia, Russia, Poland and the Americas. Groups like the Russian Mennonites developed a sense of ethnicity, which included cuisine adapted from the countries where they lived. Thus, the term Mennonite cuisine does not apply to all, or even most, Mennonites today, especially those outside of the traditional ethnic Mennonite groups. Nor is the food necessarily unique to Mennonites, most of the dishes being variations on recipes common to the countries (Netherlands, Poland, Ukraine, Russia, Latin America) where they reside or resided in the past.

Mennonites do not have any customary dietary restrictions as exist in some other religious groups. Some conservative Mennonites abstain from alcohol, but other Mennonites do not, with Mennonite distilleries existing as early as the late 16th century.

== Russian Mennonite foods ==
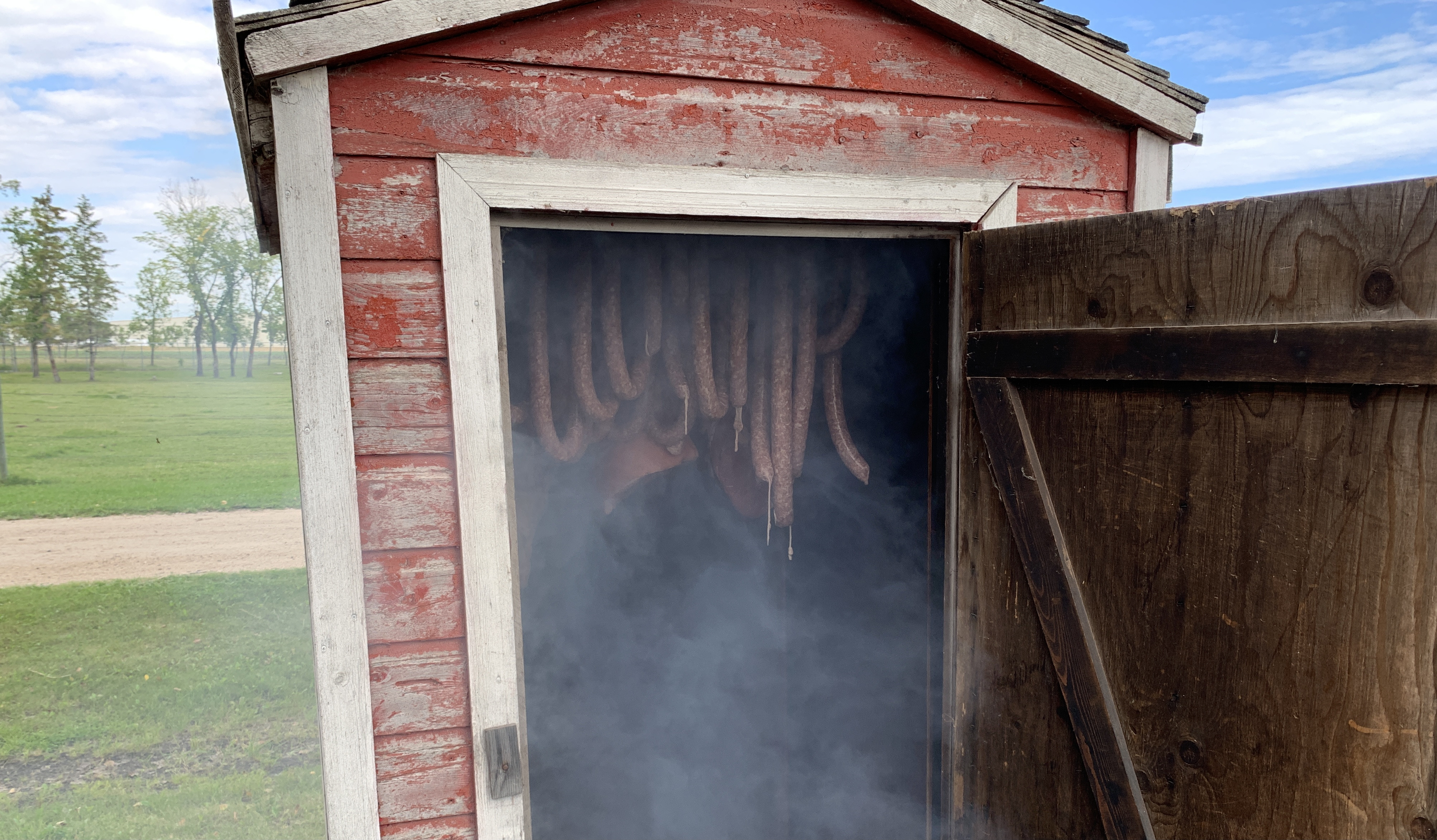
Mennonite farmer sausages in a smoke shack

Russian Mennonite cuisine combines features of various countries due to the history of migrations and most dishes would generally fall under the umbrella of Dutch, Polish, Ukrainian and Russian cuisine. Mennonites in Latin America also adopted local dishes to their cuisine. The result of all these influences is a particular cuisine unique to Russian Mennonites and not synonymous to cuisines of any of their host countries. Common ingredients in Russian Mennonite dishes include cabbage, potatoes, sausage, and a range of dairy products.

=== Common dishes ===
Common dishes for Russian Mennonites include:

- bubbat, a raisin quick bread that is either baked inside a chicken while the chicken is being roasted or baked alone as a side dish
- chicken soup made with star anise
- dill pickles
- disco/discada, a dish cooked in plow disk similar to a wok, used in Latin American Mennonite colonies, particularly Mexico
- fleisch perishki/perisky/perishky, a meat bun
- formavorscht, a smoked pork sausage, commonly called Mennonite farmer sausage
- green bean soup
- jreewe, pork cracklings
- kjiekle/kielke, pronounced cheel-chya, noodles
- knackzoat, sunflower seeds
- komst borscht (cabbage soup)
- perishki/perisky/perishky, a fruit hand pie
- plumemoos, a cold plum soup
- rice pudding
- roll kuchen, a sweet fried pastry often eaten with watermelon and syrup
- schmaundt fat, a white cream gravy
- summa borscht (summer borscht) a light cream and potato soup flavoured with formvorscht and dill
- vereniki, a cottage cheese pierogi
- waffles with a sweet white vanilla sauce
- yerba mate, brought by Mennonites from Paraguay to Canada.
- zwieback, a two-layered white bun, traditionally roasted and dried, which can be stored for several months and was the main food eaten during Mennonite migrations.

==== Seasonal specialties ====
Dishes typically served once per year are:

- paska, a sweet Easter bread
- porzelke/portzelky or New Year's Cookies, a deep-fried sweet dumpling similar to oliebol

=== Cheese ===
Mennonite-style cheese is also famous worldwide. Queso Chihuahua or queso Chester are produced by Mennonites in northern Mexico and Bothwell Cheese is created by Mennonites in Manitoba, Canada.

=== Faspa ===
Russian Mennonites also commonly participate in a late-afternoon lunch called faspa, which usually consists of zwieback, deli meat, raisin buns, pickles, and cheese (especially cheese curds). This meal is easy to prepare and intended to give farmers a mid-afternoon lunch and Mennonite women a rest on Sunday.

== Swiss Mennonite foods ==
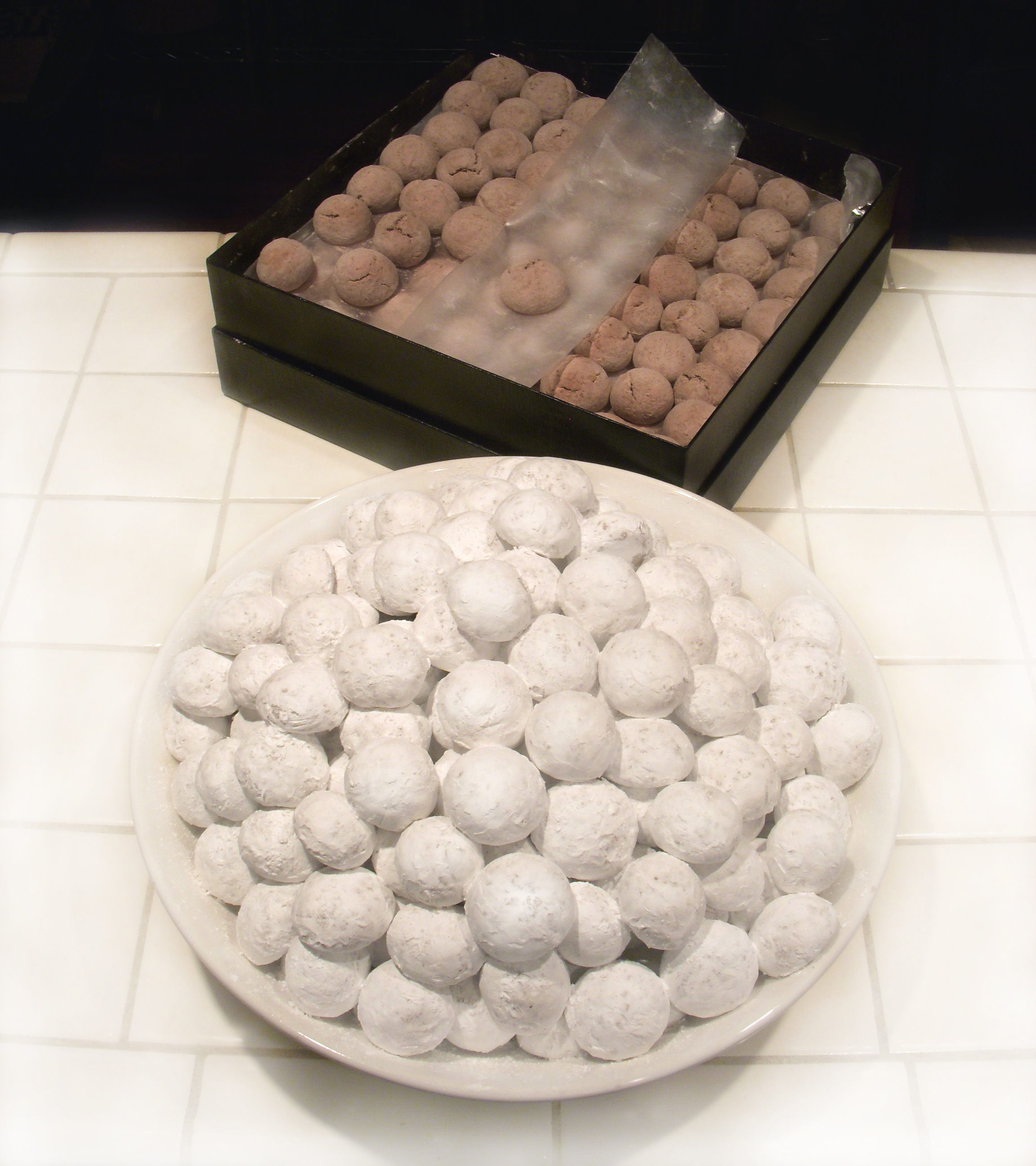
Pfeffernüsse, small spice cookies popular among ethnic Mennonites

Swiss German and south German Mennonites experienced cultural exchange with other German-speaking immigrant communities in North America. Many dishes of these communities are coidentified with Pennsylvania Dutch and Amish cuisines. Examples of these include:

- German beer sausage
- Shoofly pie
- Apple fritters
- Amish glazed donuts

Swiss Volhynian Mennonite cuisine draws on the Polish and Ukrainian cuisines associated with the Volhynia region. Some examples are:

- Bohne beroggi, a soft roll filled with sweetened bean paste, often served with a cream sauce
- Cheese beroggi, a thick noodle filled with cheese and sometimes kraut
- Kurivi, a sweet yeast bread topped with icing and candy corn
- Poppy seed roll, a sweet yeast bread rolled with a thick layer of ground poppy seed paste
- Nalesniki, a thin pancake filled with farmer’s cheese, often served with fruit

== Cookbooks ==
The Mennonite Community Cookbook by Mary Emma Showalter was originally published in 1950 and features recipes from U.S. and Canadian Mennonite communities of various backgrounds. First published in 1960 by Steinbach, Manitoba's Derksen Printers, The Mennonite Treasury of Recipes (commonly called The Mennonite Treasury) popularized Russian Mennonite cuisine and is the third-best-selling Mennonite book of all time, surpassed only recently by the writings of best-selling novelist Miriam Toews. The Mennonite Girls Can Cook series also popularized Russian Mennonite dishes, and the More-with-Less Cookbook is found in many Mennonite kitchens.
