= Mennonite settlements of Altai =

Mennonite settlements of Altai arose after the 19 September 1906 act of the Duma and State Council of Imperial Russia, which provided for a resettlement bureau to distribute free land in Altai Krai. During 1907–1908 an area of over 6,660,000 ha (26,000 mi^{2}) of the Kulunda Steppe was set aside for settlers.

== Incentives ==
The resettlers were granted certain privileges such as reduced rail rates (25% of the normal rate) and children up to ten years of age traveled free. A kopeck was levied for the shipping a pood of goods a distance of 100 verst. Settlers were exempt from municipal and state taxes in the first five years (in the subsequent five years only 50% of all taxes were appraised, and then full taxation), exempt from military service in the first three years and provided interest-free credit in the amount of 160 Russian rubles for the purchase of farm machinery, seed and other necessities. As the report of this act and its incentives reached the Russian Mennonite colonies of Crimea, southern Russia and the area of Orenburg, a strong interest arose among the landless and land-poor colonists. The price of land in the mother colonies was already so high that most of the landless farmers could no longer improve their situation. These landless workers were willing to try their luck in distant Siberia.

Jacob Reimer, head of the Sagradovka district in Kherson, informed the Mennonite colonies of Samara and Orenburg about the plans for the settlement of Siberia. Because of this, applications from settlers of these areas were received practically at the same time by the resettlement bureau in Barnaul, which explains why their villages were founded in the immediate neighborhood of one another.

At the end of April 1907 representatives of different Mennonite settlements met in Barnaul and presented an application for around 670 km^{2} (260 mi^{2}) of Kulunda Steppe land to be placed at their disposal. Their request for exclusive use of this land was granted.

== Villages ==
The resettlement of Mennonites was intensive from 1907 to 1909 and continued until the outbreak of World War I. Mennonites founded 31 villages in 19 settlements:

Villages	Districts	Population
Friedensfeld, Orloff, Rosenhof	Besymjannyj Log	4170
Ebenfeld, Hochstadt	Wysokaja Griva	2717
Landskrone	Golenkij	1450
Alexanderfeld	Griškovka	1880
Schönwiese	Degtjarka	1895
Nikolaidorf, Schönsee	Djagilevskij Nr.2	1871
Nikolaipol, Rosenfeld, Schöntal	Ivanov Log	4631
Karatal	Karatal	1535
Schönau	Karlovka Nr.8	1230
Alexanderkron, Halbstadt	Kussak	3132
Markovka	Markovka	2138
Chortitza	Perekrjostnyj	1700
Lichtenfeld	Petrovka	1645
Alexeifeld, Protassovo, Reinfeld	Protassov Log	3304
Blumenort, Gnadenheim, Kleefeld	Redkaja Dubrava	4069
Wiesenfeld	Stepnoj	1857
Gnadenfeld, Tiege	Stupin Log	3145
Alexandrovskij	Skljarovka	1688
Grünfeld	Čertjož	2605

The Orlovo district was formed on 1 January 1910 from these villages together with nine villages founded by German Roman Catholic settlers. In the following years the Roman Catholic villagers were incorporated into the Novo–Romanovka district.

By 1916 the Orlovo district consisted of 34 settlements, including those listed above as well as Schumanovka, Berjosovka and Černovka.

The settlers who founded these villages on the Kulunda Steppes originated from Molotschna, Chortitza and their daughter colonies. The number of settlers was around 1200 families, of which about 200 families were from Chortitza. The remaining Mennonite colonies in Crimea, Orenburg and Samara as far as Bashkortostan accounted for only a few percent of the settlers.

The organization for the resettlement of Mennonites in the Kulunda Steppe played an extraordinarily important role in the settlement of Sagradovka, establishing 17 villages in the first half of the 1870s with settlers from the Molotschna Colony. During 1906–1912, a total of 1847 people from this settlement resettled in Siberia, including 1726 to the Tomsk region.

== Farming methods ==
The settlers brought crop rotation to the Kulunda Steppe. In the first two years the field was planted with their main crop, wheat, and the third year with oats or rarely with barley. The fourth year the field lay fallow, allowing cattle to graze on it during the summer. In fall it was worked with a one-share plow. The cycle was complete and the earth renewed for the next planting of wheat.

Later multi-bottom plows, disks, iron harrows, drills, horse-drawn mowers and binders appeared. Horse powered threshing machines were rare. Only the vegetable garden was fertilized, because manure was gathered for fuel; there was no nearby source of coal and wood, making them expensive.

Although the settlers were hardworking, it was extraordinarily difficult for them to build up a good and profitable farm. At that time, city dwellers formed no more than 10 percent of that region's total population. In Siberia in 1909 the average grain yield was 820 kg/ha (12 bushels/acre), totaling around 4.9 million metric tons (180 million bushels) of grain. The region needed less than half this amount for its own needs. The extra grain had to be sold.

== Transport ==
The high cost of transporting Siberian grain to the European post of Russia made marketing unprofitable, because grain prices in Siberia were very low. A farmer rarely brought a crop to Kamen-na-Obi or Pavlodar, because the low price hardly covered the cost of transport. The cost of transport to Kamen-na-Obi was often more than the going rate for wheat. The settlers needed industrial products, such as farm equipment, but almost all had to be brought from the other side of the Urals and were very expensive because of the transport costs.

== Russification ==
By 1914 all of the German settlements and municipalities had to be renamed with Russian names. Typically the Russian names were formed from the name of district in which the respective villages were found: Alexanderkron - Kussak, Alexanderfeld - Griškovka, Gnadenheim - Redkaja Dubrava, Grünfeld - Čertjož, Hochstadt - Wyssokaja Griva, Lichtenfeld - Petrovka, Landskrone - Golenkij, Nikolaidorf - Djagilevka, Tiege - Uglovoje, Wiesenfeld - Stepnoj.

Some of the villages were named by translating of the German name into Russian: Ebenfeld - Rovnopol, Reinfeld - Čistoje, Rosenwald - Lesnoje, Halbstadt -Polgorod, Schönsee - Sineosjornoje, Alexeifeld - Polevoje.

Some villages received names that had no direct relationship to the region or their German name: Blumenort - Podsnežnoje, Friedensfeld -Lugovoje, Gnadenfeld - Mirnoje, Nikolaipol - Nikolskoje, Rosenhof - Dvorskoje, Schönau -Jasnoje, Schöntal - Krasnyj Dol, Kleefeld - Krasnoje.

The Orlovo was restructured into the Znamenskij district in 1924 and ceased to exist as an administrative entity.

== Economic survey ==
In 1916 an inspection commission for settler affairs examined the settlement in Tomsk. The summary provided a view of the economic condition of the Orlovo district:

35	Villages	18,156 ha	Wheat
1051	Farms	1260 ha	Barley
3083	Men	2082 ha	Oats
3576	Women	27 ha	Millet
6659	Total	16 ha	Sunflowers
5942	Horses	158 ha	Potatoes
2239	Cows	3 ha	Linseed
40	Breeding bulls	13 ha	Pasture
4514	Registered cattle	9 ha	Other
338	Sheep
4778	Swine
152	Plows	112	Drills
350	Planters	29	Grass mowers
57	Rakes	463	Mowers
89	Mowers	208	Threshing machines
143	Binders	5	Windmills
		4	Presses (e.g. for peanut oil)

== See also ==
- Anabaptist settlers
