= Russian Mennonites =

Ethnic group

Total population
- 450,000+ (2014)

Regions with significant populations
- America (notably Mexico, Bolivia, Paraguay, Canada, Belize and United States)

Religions
- Christianity (Anabaptism)

Scriptures
- Bible

Languages
- Plautdietsch (Low German), German, English, Spanish

The Russian Mennonites (German: Russlandmennoniten, lit. 'Russia Mennonites', i.e., Mennonites of or from the Russian Empire]; Spanish: Menonitas rusos) are a group of Mennonites who are the descendants of Dutch and North German Anabaptists who settled in the Vistula delta in West Prussia for about 250 years and established colonies in the Russian Empire (present-day Ukraine and Russia's Volga region, Orenburg Governorate, and Western Siberia) beginning in 1789. Since the late 19th century, many of them have migrated to countries throughout the Western Hemisphere. Most of the rest were forcibly relocated, so very few of their descendants live in the locations of the original colonies. Russian Mennonites are traditionally multilingual but Plautdietsch (Mennonite Low German) is their first language as well as their lingua franca. In 2014, there were several hundred thousand Russian Mennonites: about 200,000 live in Germany, 74,122 in Mexico, 150,000 in Bolivia, 40,000 in Paraguay, 10,000 in Belize, tens of thousands in Canada and the US, and a few thousand in Argentina, Peru, Colombia, Uruguay, and Brazil.

The term "Russian Mennonite" refers to the country where they resided before emigrating, not to their ethnicity. The term "Low-German Mennonites" is also used to avoid this conflation.

== History ==
=== Origins in the Vistula Delta ===
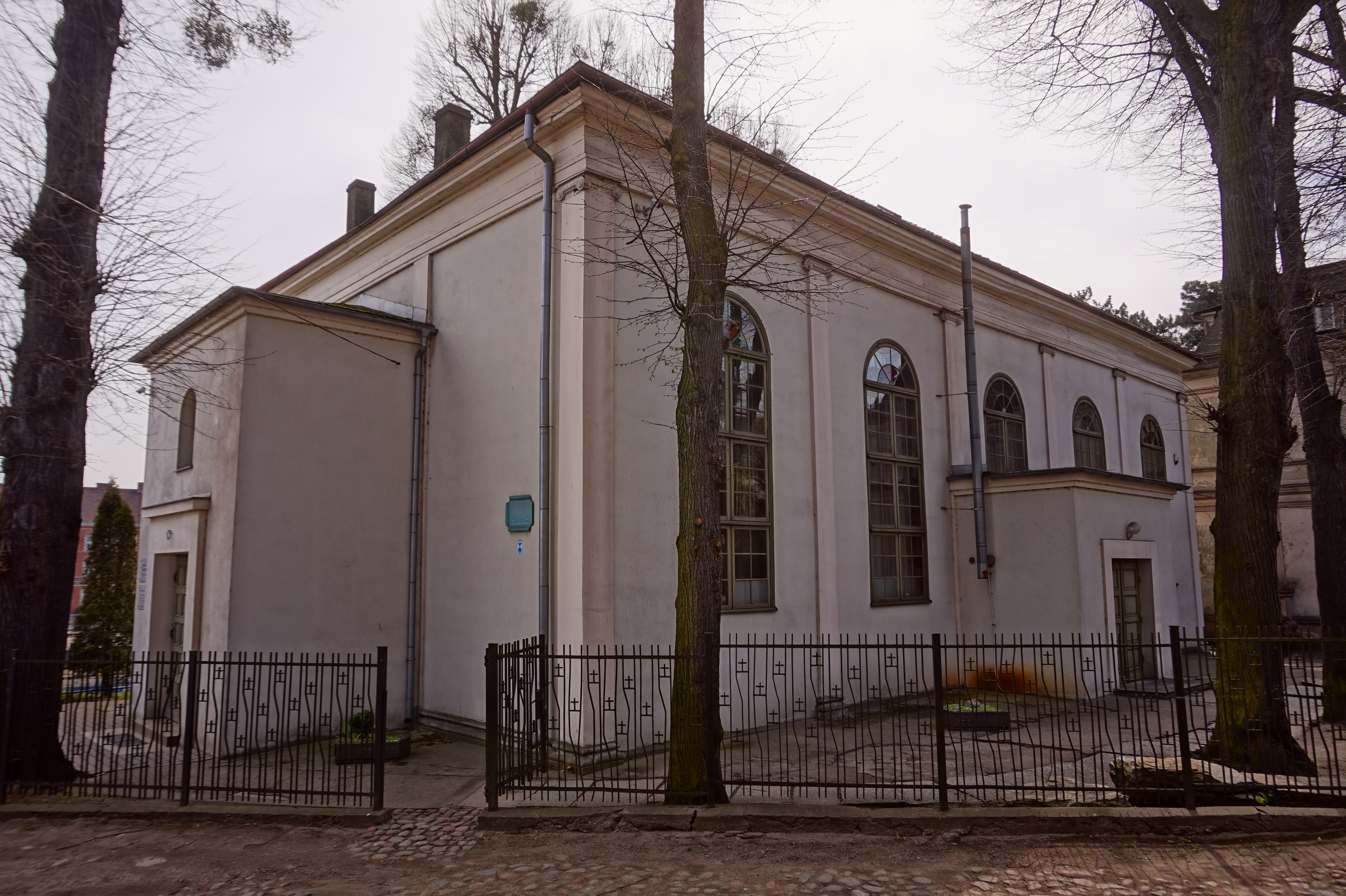
Former Mennonite Church in Gdańsk, Poland

In the early-to-mid 16th century, Mennonites began to flee to the Vistula Delta region in the Kingdom of Poland in order to avoid persecution in the Low Countries—especially Friesland and Flanders—seeking religious freedom and exemption from military service. They gradually replaced their Germanic Dutch and Frisian languages with the Low German language spoken in the area, blending into it elements of their native tongues to create a distinct dialect known as Plautdietsch. Today Plautdietsch is the distinct Mennonite language that developed over a period of 300 years in the Vistula delta region and south Russia. The Mennonites of Dutch origin were joined by Mennonites from other parts of Europe, including the German-speaking parts of the Swiss Confederacy.

In 1772, most of the Vistula delta was annexed by the Kingdom of Prussia in the First Partition of Poland. Frederick William II of Prussia ascended the throne in 1786 and imposed heavy fees on the Mennonites in exchange for continued military exemption. The remainder of the Vistula delta was annexed by Prussia in the Second Partition of Poland in 1793.

=== Migration to Russia ===
Catherine the Great of Russia issued a manifesto in 1763 inviting all Europeans, except Jews and Muslims, to come and settle various pieces of land within New Russia (today Southern Ukraine) and especially in the Volga region. Mennonites from the Vistula delta region sent delegates to negotiate an extension of this manifesto and, in 1789, Crown Prince Paul signed a new agreement with them. The Mennonite migration to Russia from the Prussian-annexed Vistula delta was led by Jacob Hoeppner and Johann Bartsch. Their settlement territory was northwest of the Sea of Azov, and had just been acquired from the Ottoman Empire in the Russo-Turkish War, 1768–1774. Many of the Mennonites in Prussia accepted this invitation, establishing Chortitza on the Dnieper River as their first colony in 1789. A second, larger colony, Molotschna, was founded in 1804.

Mennonites lived in the same region as Nogais—semi-nomadic pastoralists—in the Molotschna region of southern Ukraine starting from 1803, when Mennonites first arrived, until 1860, when the Nogai Tatars were displaced. Mennonite historiography has depicted Mennonites as beneficial to the supposedly "backward" Nogai, providing them with agricultural jobs and renting pasture from them. Nogai raids on Mennonite herds were a common occurrence in the first two decades of settlement. The Mennonite settlement in Ukraine led to the displacement of the majority of the Nogai population.

Two Mennonite settlements on the Vistula near Warsaw, Kazuń Nowy and Nowe Wymyśle, came under Russian control after Mazovia was annexed by Russia at the Congress of Vienna (1815). Some of these families immigrated to the Molotschna settlement after it was established. Deutsch-Michalin near Machnovka was founded in 1787. Many families from this settlement moved to nearby Volhynia in 1802. Swiss Mennonites of Amish descent from Galicia settled near Dubno, Volhynia province in 1815. Other Galician Mennonites lived near Lviv.

When the Prussian government eliminated exemption from military service on religious grounds, most of the remaining Mennonites were eager to immigrate to Russia. They were offered land along the Volga River in Samara Governorate and exemption from military service for twenty years, after which they could pay a special exemption tax. Two settlements, Trakt and Alt-Samara (to distinguish it from Neu Samara Colony), were founded in 1853 and 1861 respectively.

By 1870 about 9000 individuals had immigrated to Russia, mostly to the Chortitza and Molotschna settlements which, with population increase, numbered about 45,000. Forty daughter colonies were established by 1914, occupying nearly 12,000 square kilometres (4,600 sq mi), with a total population of 100,000.

==== Life in the Russian Empire ====
===== Economy =====
The colonists formed villages of fifteen to thirty families, each with 70 ha (175 acres) of land. The settlements retained some communal land and a common granary for use by the poor in lean years. Income from communal property provided funding for large projects, such as forming daughter colonies for the growing population. Insurance was also organized separately and outside control by the Russian government.

Initially the settlers raised cattle, sheep and general crops to provide for their household. The barren steppes were much drier than their Vistula delta homeland and it took years to work out the proper dry-land farming practices. They grew mulberries for the silk industry, produced honey, flax and tobacco, and marketed fruits and vegetables for city markets. By the 1830s wheat became the dominant crop.

Expanding population and the associated pressure for more farmland became a problem by 1860. The terms of the settlement agreement prevented farms from being divided; they were required to pass intact from one generation to the next. Since agriculture was the main economic activity, an expanding class of discontented, landless poor arose. Their problems tended to be ignored by the village assembly, which consisted of voting landowners. By the early 1860s the problem became so acute that the landless organized a party that petitioned the Russian government for relief. A combination of factors relieved their plight. The Russian government permitted farms to be divided in half or quarters and ordered release of the village's communal land. The colonies themselves purchased land and formed daughter colonies on the eastern frontier extending into Siberia and Turkestan. These new colonies included Bergtal, Neu Samara Colony and the Mennonite settlements of Altai.

As wheat farming expanded, the demand for mills and farm equipment grew. The first large foundry was established in Chortitza in 1860 and other firms followed. By 1911 the eight largest Mennonite-owned factories produced 6% of the total Russian output (over 3 million rubles), shipped machinery to all parts of the empire and employed 1744 workers. The annual output of Lepp and Wallman of Schönwiese was 50,000 mowers, 3000 threshing machines, thousands of gangplows in addition to other farm equipment. Flour and feed mills were originally wind-powered, a skill transplanted from Prussia. These were eventually replaced with motor- and steam-driven mills. Milling and its supporting industries grew to dominate the industrial economy of the colonies and nearby communities.

===== Local government =====
Mennonite colonies were self-governing with little intervention from the Russian authorities. The village, the basic unit of government, was headed by an elected magistrate who oversaw village affairs. Each village controlled its own school and roads, and cared for the poor. Male landowners decided local matters at village assemblies.

Villages were grouped into districts. All of the Chortitza villages formed one district; Molotschna was divided into two districts: Halbstadt and Gnadenfeld. A district superintendent headed a regional bureau that could administer corporal punishment and handle other matters affecting the villages in common. Insurance and fire protection were handled at the regional level, as well as dealing with delinquents and other social problems. The Mennonite colonies functioned as a democratic state, enjoying freedoms beyond those of ordinary Russian peasants.

In addition to village schools, the Mennonite colonies established their own hospitals, a mental hospital and a school for the deaf. They cared for orphans and elderly and provided an insurance program. By being largely self-sufficient in these local matters, they were able to minimize their burden on and contact with the Russian government.

Mennonites stayed out of Russian politics and social movements that preceded the Russian revolution. After the Russian Revolution of 1905 they did exercise their right to vote. Most aligned themselves with the Octobrist Party because of its guarantee of religious freedoms and freedom of the press for minority groups. Hermann Bergmann was an Octobrist member of the Third and Fourth State Dumas; Peter Schröder, a Constitutional Democratic party member from Crimea, was a member of the fourth Duma.

===== Education =====
At a time when compulsory education was unknown in Europe, the Mennonite colonies formed an elementary school in each village. Students learned practical skills such as reading and writing German and arithmetic. Religion was included as was singing in many schools. The teacher was typically a craftsperson or herder, untrained in teaching, who fit class time around his occupation.

In 1820 the Molotschna colony started a secondary school at Ohrloff, bringing a trained teacher from Prussia. The Central School was started in Chortitza in 1842. Over three thousand pupils attended the Central School with up to 8% of the colonists receiving a secondary education. A school of commerce was started in Halbstadt employing a faculty with full graduate education. Those who wanted to pursue post-secondary education attended universities in Switzerland and Germany as well as Russia.

===== Religious life =====
Typically each village or group of villages organized an independent congregation. Cultural and traditional differences between Frisian and Flemish Mennonites were also reflected in those of their churches. They all agreed on fundamental Mennonite beliefs such as believer's baptism, nonresistance and avoidance of oaths. Pastors of Flemish congregations read sermons from a book while seated at a table. Frisian pastors stood while delivering the sermon.

Pastors were untrained and chosen from within the congregation. Unpaid pastors were selected from among the wealthier members—large landowners, sometimes teachers—allowing them to make a living while serving the congregation. The combined effect of respect for their position and material wealth gave them substantial influence over the community.

Church discipline was exercised in the form of excommunication against those who had committed sins and refused to repent and ask for forgiveness. The most conservative congregations practiced "avoidance", which entailed cutting all business and most social ties with an unrepentant member, but members still had the obligation to help the shunned person if he was in grave need. Because being part of a Mennonite congregation was required to enjoy the special benefits the Russian government provided to colonists, excommunication had broader implications. This was softened by the various internal factions, which allowed a person banned from one congregation to join another.

=== First wave of emigration ===
As nationalism grew in central Europe, the Russian government could no longer justify the special status of its German-speaking colonists. In 1870 they announced a Russification plan that would end all special privileges by 1880. Mennonites were particularly alarmed at the possibility of losing their exemption from military service and their right for schools to use the German language, which they believed was necessary to maintain their cultural and religious life.

Delegates were sent to Petersburg in 1871 to meet with the czar and appeal for relief on religious grounds. They met with high officials, but failed to present the czar with their petition. A similar attempt the next year was also unsuccessful, but were assured by the Tsar's brother Grand Duke Konstantin that the new law would provide a way to address the concerns of the Mennonites in the form of noncombatant military service.

The most conscientious Mennonites could not accept any form of service that supported making war, prompting their community leaders to seek immigration options. In 1873 a delegation of twelve explored North America, seeking large tracts of fertile farmland. This group consisted of Leonhard Sudermann and Jacob Buller of the Alexanderwohl congregation representing the Molotschna settlement; Tobias Unruh from Volhynia settlements; Andreas Schrag of the Swiss Volhynia congregations; Heinrich Wiebe, Jacob Peters and Cornelius Buhr from the Bergthal Colony; William Ewert from West Prussia; Cornelius Toews and David Klassen of the Kleine Gemeinde and Paul and Lorenz Tschetter representing the Hutterites. This group returned with positive reports of good land available in Manitoba, Minnesota, South Dakota, Nebraska and Kansas.

The more conservative groups, those from Chortitza, Bergtal and Kleine Gemeinde, chose Canada, which promised privileges equal to those previously held in Russia and a large tract of land to reestablish colonies in Manitoba (East Reserve and West Reserve). The more liberal groups, those from Molotschna, and the Hutterites chose the United States. Entire communities such as Alexanderwohl and Bergtal prepared to move as a unit as well as many individual families from among the other Mennonite villages. They sold their property, often at reduced prices and worked through the red tape and high fees of procuring passports.

Realizing that 40,000 of Russia's most industrious farmers were preparing to leave for North America, the Russian government sent Eduard Totleben to the colonies in May 1874. Meeting with community leaders, he exaggerated the difficulties that would be encountered in North America and offered an alternative national service that would not be connected in any way to the military. His intervention convinced the more liberal Mennonites to stay.

Between 1874 and 1880, of the approximately 45,000 Mennonites in South Russia, 10,000 departed for the United States and 8,000 for Manitoba. The settlement of Mennonites, primarily in the central United States, where available cropland had similarity to that in the Crimean Peninsula, coincided with the completion of the Transcontinental Railroad in 1869. Others looked east, and in one of the strangest chapters of Mennonite history, Claas Epp, Jr., Abraham Peters and other leaders led hundreds of Mennonites to Central Asia in the 1880s, where they expected Christ's imminent return. They settled in the Talas Valley of Turkestan and in the Khanate of Khiva. For those who remained in Russia, the military service question was resolved by 1880 with a substitute four-year forestry service program for men of military age.

=== World War I ===
During the period of the 'Great War', the Mennonites in Russia were well advanced socially and economically. Many large agricultural estates and business entities were controlled by Mennonite interests. They had a reputation for outstanding efficiency and quality and were noted across Russia for their agricultural and organizational abilities. The precedent of non-resistant national service had been established years before and the Mennonites therefore had a system to handle military service requests at the outbreak of war. During World War I, 5000 Mennonite men served in both forestry and hospital units and transported wounded from the battlefield to Moscow and Ekaterinoslav hospitals. The Mennonite congregations were responsible for funding these forms of alternative service, as well as supporting the men's families during their absence, a burden of 3.5 million rubles annually. During this time there was a progressive breakdown in the autonomy of the Mennonite colonies and social and financial pressure began to take their effect on the Mennonite people and their institutions. Property and possessions began to be confiscated for the war effort and certain industrial complexes turned to military production (some voluntarily). In early 1917 the February Revolution occurred and much of the Mennonite hope at that time was based on the preservation of the new Russian Provisional Government. However, as the war progressed, the social tide turned against the existing power structure and Russia began a march toward structural discord.

The chaos that followed the collapse of the Russian Provisional Government in the October Revolution was devastating to much of Ukraine, including the Mennonite colonies. The Red and White armies moved through the region, confiscating food and livestock. Nestor Makhno's anarchist army generally targeted Mennonites because they were thought of as "Kulaks" and an entity generally more advanced and wealthy than the surrounding Ukrainian peasants. The Mennonites' Germanic background also served to inflame negative sentiment during the period of revolution. It is also rumored that Makhno himself had served on a Mennonite estate in childhood and harbored negative feelings based on treatment he received while employed there. Hundreds of Mennonites were murdered, robbed, imprisoned and raped during this period, and villages including (and around) Chortitza, Zagradovka and Nikolaipol were damaged and destroyed. Many more people died from typhus, cholera and sexually transmitted diseases, spread by the anarchist army warring throughout the colonies.

Based on the tragedy unfolding around them, some of the avowed pacifist Mennonites turned to self-defense and established militia units (Selbstschutz) to ward off raiding forces with the help of the German Army. This was regarded as a failure of spiritual commitment by many within the community (currently and at the time). The forces initially achieved some military success in defending Mennonite colonies and families while the communities tried to escape and/or relocate. Ultimately the self-defence militia was overwhelmed once Makhno's anarchists aligned themselves with the Red Army early in 1919. While the resistance certainly helped defend Mennonite communities against initial attacks, it may also have served to inflame some of the atrocities that followed. After this period, many Mennonites were dispossessed and ultimately their remaining properties and possessions were nationalized (collectivization) by the Soviet authorities.

The impacts of the trauma experienced during World War I and the Russian Revolution had lasting impacts on Russian Mennonites. Even though Mennonites who immigrated to North America experienced drastically less violence and the privilege of land ownership, many still showed very high levels of psychological distress. First through third generation Mennonites in North America were found to have high levels of depression, hysteria, psychasthenia, post traumatic stress disorder, ego strength, anxiety, repression, and over-controlled hostility.

=== Famine ===
Mennonites of Molotschna sent a commission to North America in the summer of 1920 to alert American Mennonites of the dire conditions of war-torn Ukraine. Their plight succeeded in uniting various branches of Mennonites to form the Mennonite Central Committee in an effort to coordinate aid.

The new organization planned to provide aid to Ukraine via existing Mennonite relief work in Istanbul. The Istanbul group, mainly Goshen College graduates, produced three volunteers, who at great risk entered Ukraine during the ongoing Russian Civil War. They arrived in the Mennonite village of Halbstadt in the Molotschna settlement just as General Wrangel of the White Army was retreating. Two of the volunteers withdrew with the Wrangel army, while Clayton Kratz, who remained in Halbstadt as it was overrun by the Red Army, was never heard from again.

A year passed before official permission was received from the Soviet government to do relief work among the villages of Ukraine (see Russian famine of 1921). Kitchens provided 25,000 people a day with rations over a period of three years beginning in 1922, with a peak of 40,000 servings during August of that year. Fifty Fordson tractor and plow combinations were sent to Mennonite villages to replace horses that had been stolen and confiscated during the war. The cost of this relief effort was $1.2 million.

=== Second wave of emigration ===
As conditions improved, Mennonites turned their attention from survival to emigration. Though the New Economic Policy appeared to be less radical than previous Soviet reforms, thousands of Mennonites saw no future under the communists. After years of negotiation with foreign governments and Moscow, arrangements were made for immigration to Canada, Paraguay and Argentina. Because Canada had not recognized the Soviet government, Moscow would not deal with them directly. Emigrants bound for Canada were processed through Riga. Those who could not pass the medical exam—usually because of trachoma—were allowed to stay in Germany and Southampton in England until they were healthy. By 1930, 21,000 Mennonites had arrived in Canada, most on credit provided by the Canadian Pacific Railway. Another group went to Paraguay where they founded the Fernheim and Friesland Colonies.

A group of Mennonites from western Siberia who subsequently settled along the Amur in unrealized hopes of better living conditions, escaped over the frozen river to Harbin, China. A few hundred were allowed entry into California and Washington. The majority remained as refugees until the Nansen International Office for Refugees of the League of Nations intervened and arranged resettlement in Paraguay and Brazil in 1932.

Those that remained in their home villages were subject to exile to Siberia and other remote regions east of the Urals. From 1929 to 1940, one in eight men were removed, usually under the pretext of political accusations, to labor camps from which few ever returned or were heard from again.

=== Collectivization ===
With the onset of economic and agricultural reforms, large estates and the communal land of the Mennonite colonies were confiscated. The next step was to reduce the model farms by 60% and then another 50% — an insufficient size to support a family. The confiscated land was given to peasants from outside the Mennonite communities, often communist party members. These new villagers soon controlled the local government, further confiscating land and rights from the Mennonite majority by labeling landowners and leaders kulaks and sending them into exile. The government taxed the remaining landowners so heavily that they could not possibly produce enough to meet the obligation and their land was confiscated as payment. As collectivization proceeded, there was some hope that Mennonites could run their own collective farms, but with the introduction of Stalin's first five-year plan there was no hope that such a scheme would be allowed.

Starting in 1918 religious freedoms were restricted. Churches and congregations had to be registered with the government. Ministers were disenfranchised and lost their rights as citizens. Ministers could not be teachers, which was the livelihood of many Mennonite pastors. They and their family members could not join cooperatives or craft guilds. Because of these restrictions, ministers had a strong incentive to emigrate, and few were willing to replace them. Congregations could no longer do charitable work of any kind, which destroyed the well developed social institutions with the Mennonite colonies. Villages lost control of their schools; all religious content was prohibited. Sunday was abolished as a holiday.

During World War I the Russians had permitted Mennonites to serve in non-combat capacities in the military. This practice was not continued.

Following the Russian withdrawal from World War I, the Russian Civil War ensued, with an ultimate Red victory. The Russian Mennonites, many of whom were also known as being part of the one million or so Volga Germans living in their own established communities, were approached by the Soviet authorities and issued new standards and expectations. Education was to be controlled according to these new directives by the State, and families were eventually to be separated, with children sent to various live-in schools, while parents were to be assigned according to State needs.

These directives were described by a Volga German teacher, Henry Wieler, who attended these State meetings and related the events in his detailed Journal, Tagabook, which today is partially translated but available in the published book, The Quiet in the Land, by Henry Wieler.

=== World War II to the 21st century ===
In 1937 and 1938 the NKVD carried out ethnically motivated purges of German descendants and German language speakers, including Mennonites. As Stalin fomented cooperation with the Russian Orthodox Church in World War II, Mennonites and Protestants were seen as more dangerous. During the Holodomor in Ukraine, there was active persecution of German-speaking people as a potential threat to the state, and a ban on organized religion. The hostilities of World War I had increased tensions with ethnic Ukrainians, and Mennonites with family members living abroad were targeted during the Great Purge.

The Mennonites suffered persecution by the Stalinist regime, which advocated state atheism. As pacifists within an increasingly military regime under Stalin and then (after invasion of Ukraine and parts of Russia by Hitler) the Nazis, and as "Volga Germans" whose abuse Hitler had used as a pretext to invade, Mennonites were subject to special pressure to join military units. Mennonites played a central role in managing the labor force at Stutthof concentration camp, and some, recruited into SS units, served as guards at concentration camps or carried out shootings of prisoners. Other Mennonites were conscripted by force into German units as support and shock troops and some participated in anti-partisan operations. Most history of this period is anecdotal and based on family memoirs and letters from the Gulags.

Peter Letkemann of University of Winnipeg characterizes the casualties and abuses of this period as "victims of terror and repression in the Soviet Union during the 40-year period from 1917–1956." This would overlap somewhat with the "Siberian Germans" deported to that region who have lost touch entirely with the Mennonite mainstream worldwide.

Between 1987 and 1993 about 100,000 persons of Mennonite origin emigrated from the USSR to Germany. Today in Ukraine there are three Mennonite communities in Zaporizhzhia Oblast and Kherson Oblast and a Mennonite community in Ternopil Oblast.

=== North America ===
After 1870 about 18,000 Russian Mennonites, fearing conscription into military service and state influence on their education systems, immigrated to the plains states of the US and the Western Provinces of Canada. The more liberal went in general to the US where the majority over a period of several decades assimilated more or less into the mainstream society.

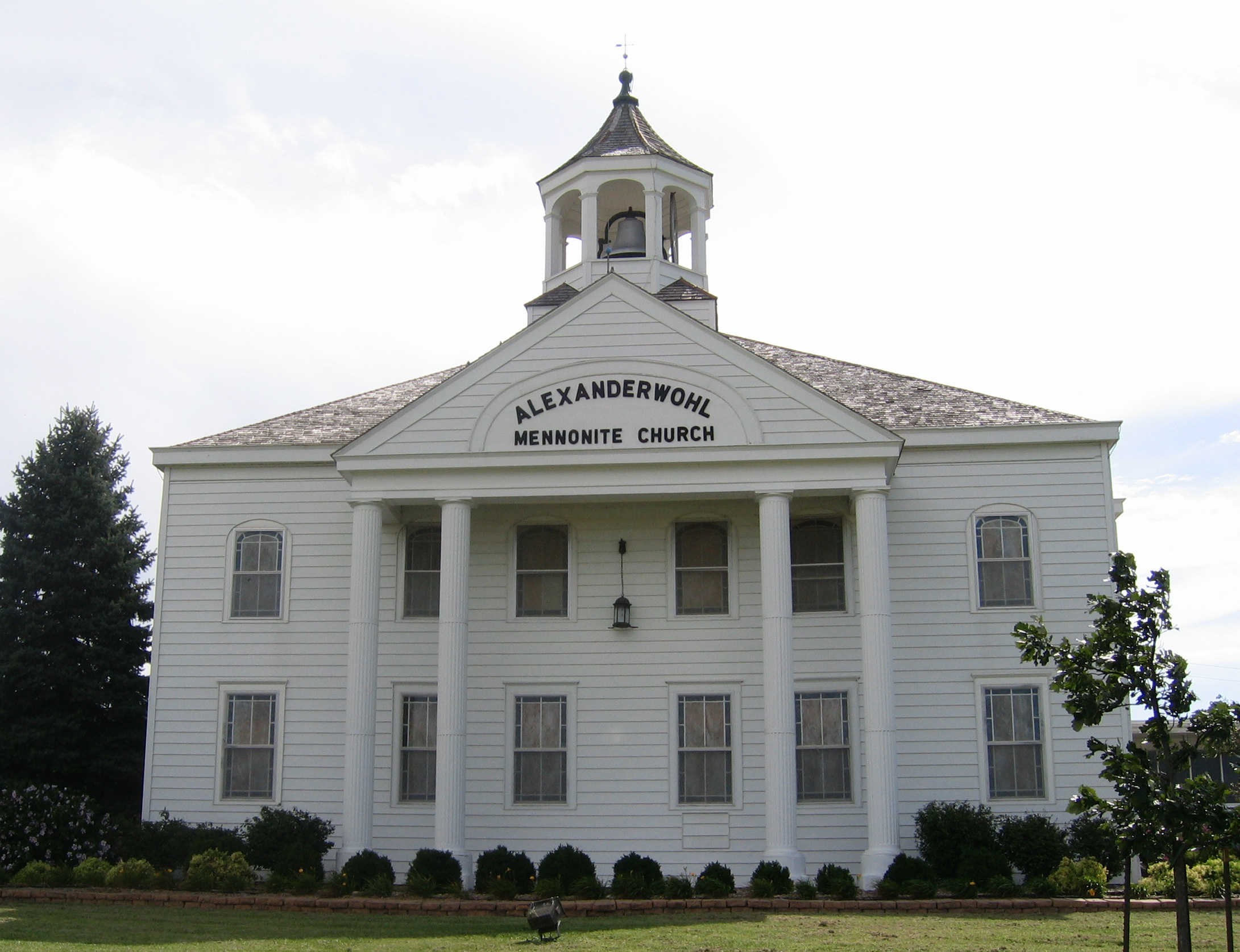
Alexanderwohl Mennonite Church near Goessel, Kansas

Russian Mennonites settled much of South Central Kansas, which owes its reputation as a wheat-producing state in large measure to its early Mennonite settlers. Winter wheat was introduced to Kansas in 1873. The following year the Mennonites, who had experience with dry land farming in Russia, quickly took advantage of its characteristics, resulting in rapid expansion of the milling industry in the state. It is planted in the fall and harvested in June and July of the following summer, and is therefore ideally suited to cold winters and the hot, dry Kansas summers. Kansas remains a top producer of wheat in America to this day.

The more conservative Old Colony, Bergthal Mennonites and Kleine Gemeinde went to Canada which promised privileges equal to those previously held in Russia (no conscription into military service and German language private schools) and a large tract of land divided into two "Reserves". The Mennonites settled mostly in Manitoba in areas east and west of the Red River, called East Reserve and West Reserve.

They brought with them many of their institutions and practices, especially their traditional settling pattern which meant that they settled in vast exclusively Mennonite areas where they formed villages with German names such as Blumenort, Steinbach and Grünthal.

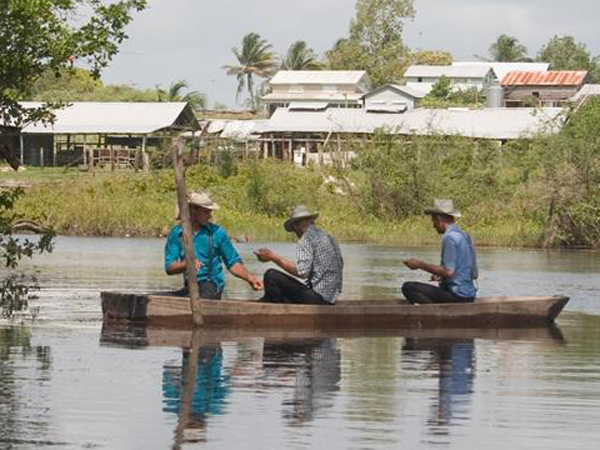
Mennonites on New River, Belize

The more conservative faction of the Manitoba Mennonites decided to leave Canada after World War I and moved to Mexico mostly in the years 1922–1927 and to Paraguay in 1927. The main reasons were compulsory attendance at public schools and anti-German sentiments because of the war. Some latercomers went to Mexico in 1948. After the more conservative fraction had left for Mexico, most of the remaining Mennonites quickly assimilated into the mainstream society.

Descendants of Manitoba Mennonites today form the majority of Conservative Mennonites in Latin America, counting more than 200,000. Because many of these Mennonites from Canada still hold Canadian passports-there was and still is a steady flow back to Canada fed by the high birth rates of conservative Mennonites. These emigrants strengthen the Russian Mennonite element in the Canadian Mennonite churches.

With the Russian Mennonites came separate denominations previously unseen in North America, such as the Mennonite Brethren.

A second wave of Russian Mennonites came out of Russia after the bloody strife following the Russian Revolution of 1917 and a third wave in the aftermath of World War I. These people, having lost everything they had known, found their way to settlements in Alberta, Saskatchewan, Manitoba, British Columbia and Ontario and in many regions of the United States. Some joined with previous Mennonite groups, while others formed their own. A key figure negotiating with the government on behalf of 20,000 of the Mennonite immigrants at this time, and mediating among the Mennonites themselves, was David Toews, founding chairman of the Canadian Mennonite Board of Colonization.

In 1977 "Russian" Mennonites from Mexico established a settlement in Gaines County, Texas, where they started to do farming and ranching. By 2005, this county became the number-one cotton and peanut-producing county in entire Texas. Between 5,000 and 10,000 mennonites live now in this county.

=== Latin America ===
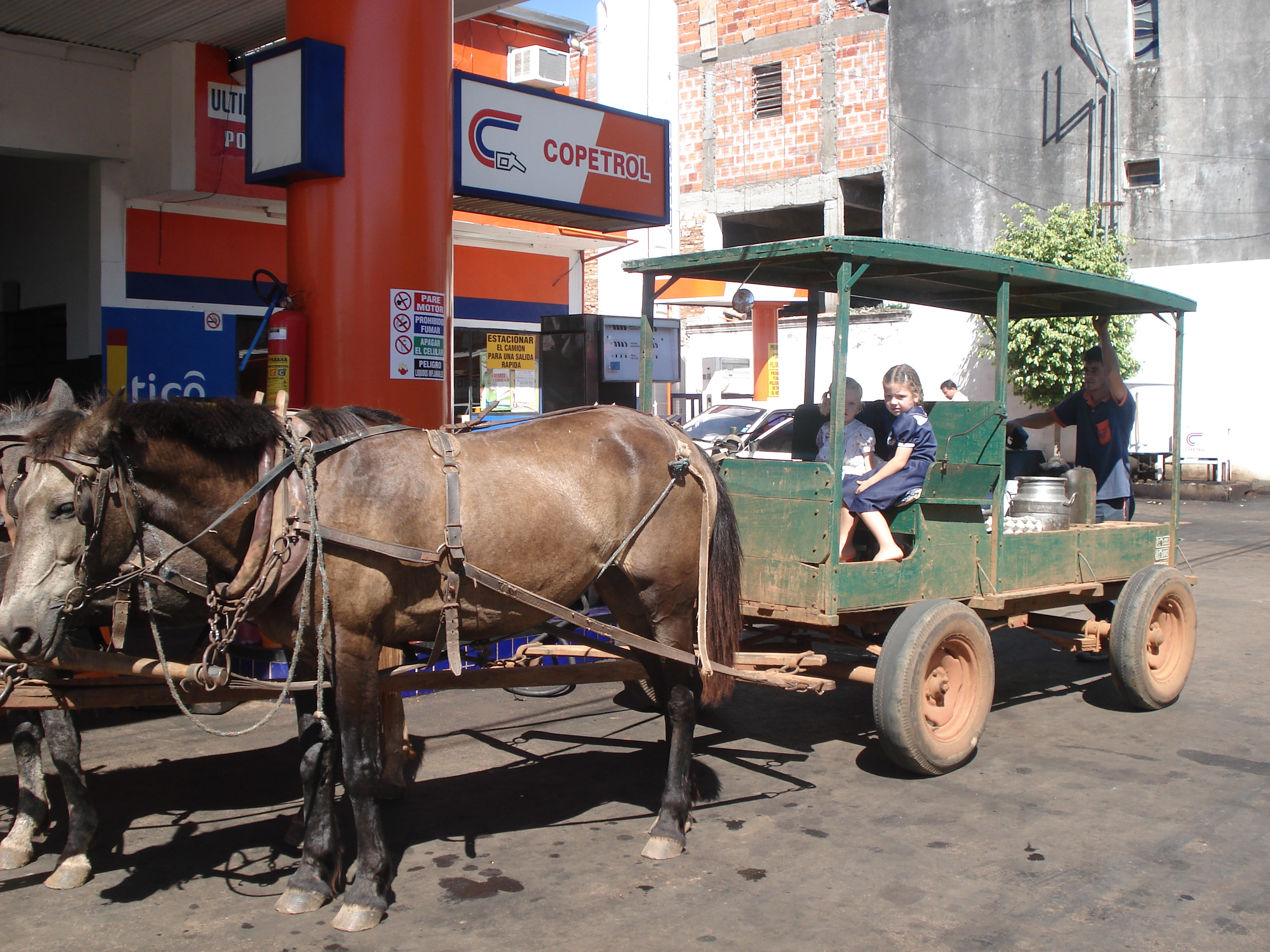
Mennonite children in San Ignacio, Paraguay

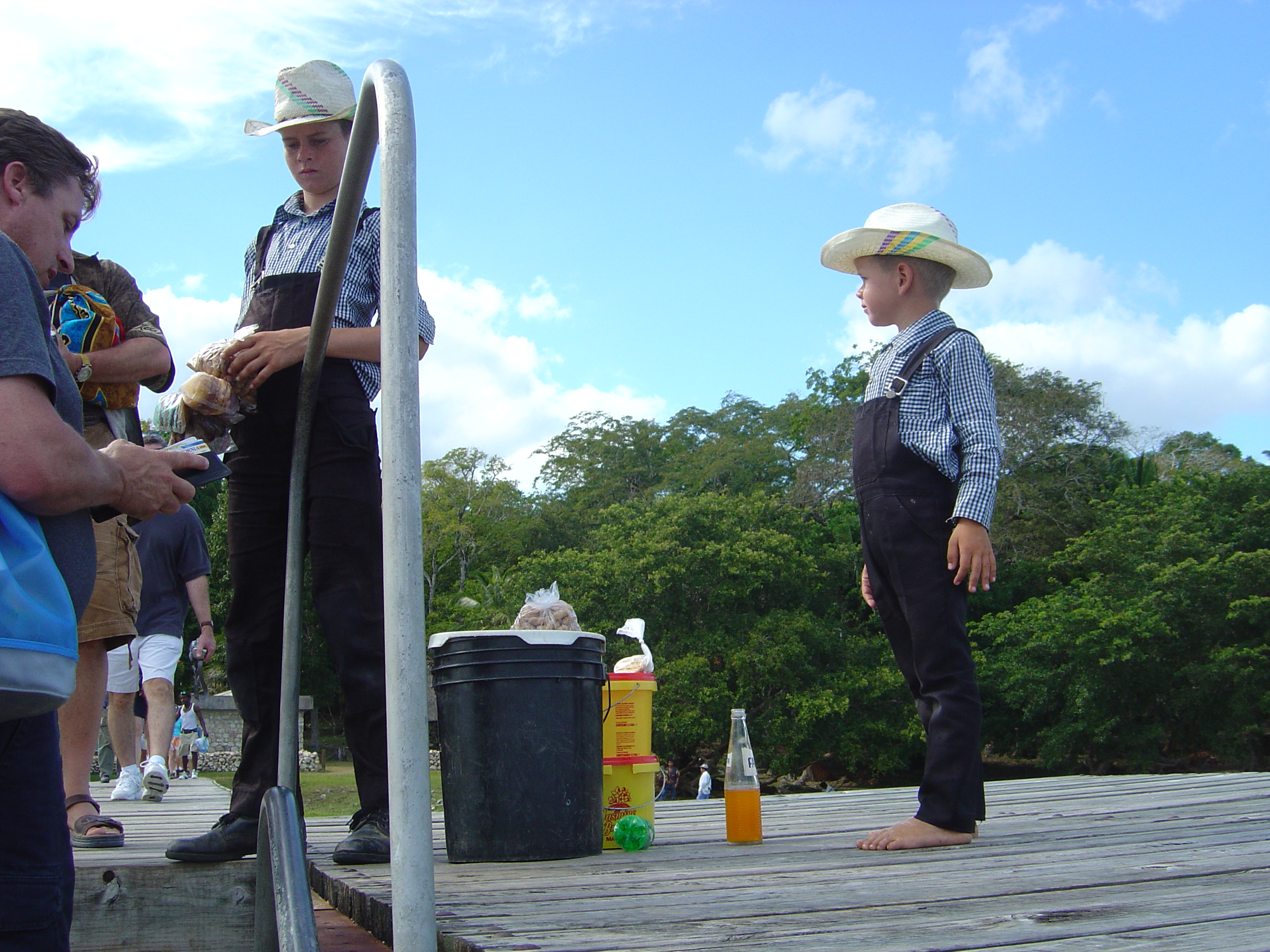
Mennonite children selling peanuts to tourists near Lamanai, Belize

The emigration from Canada to Mexico and Paraguay in the 1920s was a reaction to the introduction of universal, secular compulsory education in 1917 requiring the use of the English language, which the more conservative Mennonites saw as a threat to the religious basis of their community.

The first colony in a Latin American country was established by Mennonites from Canada between 1922 and 1925 in Mexico in the state of Chihuahua near the city of Cuauhtémoc. The next country was Paraguay, where Menno Colony was formed 1927 by Mennonites from Canada, whereas Fernheim and Friesland Colonies were formed in the 1930s by Mennonites from the Soviet Union who were fleeing starvation (Holodomor), persecution of religion and Collectivization under Stalin. Neuland and Volendam Colonies were founded 1947 by Mennonites who fled the Soviet Union at the end of World War II. All other Mennonite colonies in Latin America were formed by Mennonites who settled in North America since 1870, partly via Mexico and Belize.

Beginning in 1954 conservative Mennonites settled in East-Bolivia, in the Santa Cruz Department. Bolivia soon became the refuge for Mennonites who wanted to flee the influences of modern society. In 2006 there were 41 Mennonite colonies in Bolivia. Old Colony Mennonites went from Mexico to Belize in 1959 and to Argentina in 1986.

- 90,000 to 150,000 in Bolivia
- 75,000 in Mexico
- 40,000 in Paraguay
- 15,000 in Belize
- ~10,000 in the United States
- ~10,000 in Brazil
- 5,000 in Argentina
- 3,500 in Colombia
- 1,500 in Uruguay
- 1,000 in Peru

As of 2017, the population of Mennonites living in Mexico has declined sharply, according to some estimates. Worsening poverty, water shortages and drug-related violence across northern Mexico have provoked large numbers of Mennonites living in the Mexican states of Durango and Chihuahua to relocate abroad in recent years, especially to Canada and other regions of Latin America. Between 2012 and 2017 alone, it is estimated that at least 30,000 Mexican Mennonites immigrated to Canada.

A distinguished writer and historian about the Russian Mennonites in Latin America, especially in Paraguay, was Peter P. Klassen.

== Denominations ==
=== Church of God in Christ, Mennonite ===
The Church of God in Christ, Mennonite, commonly referred to as Holdeman Mennonites after the founder of the church, is a theologically Conservative Mennonite plain dress denomination founded in the United States but made up primarily of descendants of Russian Mennonites, including many former members of the Kleine Gemeinde. In 2013 the church had 24,400 baptized members.

=== General Conference ===
The main body of Mennonites continued to be congregational in organization until 1882 when the General Conference of Mennonite Congregations in Russia was formed. Cooperation among Mennonite congregations throughout the empire became necessary for dealing with common interests, such as publishing a hymnal, adopting a confession of faith, preserving the German language, education and running the forestry service, an alternative to military service. The conference adopted the motto Unity in essentials, tolerance in non-essentials, moderation in all things.

The Russianization program of Stolypin required the conference to publish its proceedings in Russian, certify all delegates with the imperial government and allow a government representative to attend all sessions. The conference found itself devoting more time to dealing with changing government policies and protecting the special privileges of Mennonites. An important task was to convince the government that Mennonitism was an established religion and not a sect, a label applied to small religious groups who were regularly mistreated within the Russian empire.

The group that immigrated to North America called itself the General Conference Mennonite Church. Today, the main branches of the former General Conference Mennonite Church have split into the Mennonite Church Canada (since 2000) and the Mennonite Church USA (since 2002).

=== Kleine Gemeinde ===
Klaas Reimer and a group of eighteen followers broke from the main group and formed the Kleine Gemeinde (small congregation). Reimer's main complaint was that Mennonite leaders were straying from their traditional nonresistant stance when they turned lawbreakers over to the government for punishment while at the same time church leaders were lax in enforcing spiritual discipline. In 1860 a portion of this group moved to Crimea, adopted baptism by immersion and became known as the Krimmer Mennonite Brethren. Today, the largest group of Kleine Gemeinde are located in Mexico. The majority of the Canadian congregations became theologically evangelical in the mid-20th century and are now called the Evangelical Mennonite Conference.

=== Mennonite Brethren ===
Pietistic influences, introduced earlier among the West Prussian Mennonites, were transplanted to the Molotschna colony. The pastor of a neighboring congregation, Eduard Wüst, reinforced this pietism. Wüst was a revivalist who stressed repentance and Christ as a personal savior, influencing Catholics, Lutherans and Mennonites in the area. He associated with many Mennonite leaders, including Leonhard Sudermann.

In 1859, Joseph Höttmann, a former associate of Wüst met with a group of Mennonites to discuss problems within the main Mennonite body. Their discussion centered on participating in closed communion with church members who were unholy or not converted and baptism of adults by immersion.

The Mennonite Brethren Church formally broke with the main church on January 6, 1860, when this growing group of dissenters presented a document to the elders of the Molotschna Mennonite Churches which indicated "that the total Mennonite brotherhood has decayed to the extent that we can no more be part of it" and fear the "approach of an unavoidable judgment of God." The Mennonite Brethren movement spread throughout the Mennonite colonies and produced many distinguished leaders, particularly in Molotschna. By breaking religious and cultural patterns that had become a hindrance to Mennonite society, the contribution of the Mennonite Brethren allowed all Mennonites groups to pursue a more wholesome Christian life.

=== Old Colony ===
Not to be confused with Old Order Mennonites, who are primarily of Swiss-German origin, the name Old Colony Mennonites (German: Altkolonier-Mennoniten) refers to part of the Russian Mennonite movement that is descended from colonists who migrated from the Chortitza Colony, as opposed to the slightly newer Molotschna colony, in Russia and are theologically Conservative Mennonites. Old Colony Mennonites consist of a number of groups that are still quite conservative, including Sommerfelder, Reinlander, and Old Colony, as well as groups that are no longer as conservative such as the Christian Mennonite Conference (formerly the Chortitzer Mennonite conference), which is evangelical in doctrine.

== Culture ==
Most ethnic Russian Mennonites no longer reside in Russia, with the majority being spread across the Americas. Russian Mennonites are diverse in terms of theology and dress, while many have assimilated into larger American, Canadian, or Mexican culture. Still shared by many Russian Mennonites, assimilated or not, is the Plautdietsch language, certain dishes Mennonite cuisine such as vereniki, zwieback, and farmer sausage and certain common surnames such as Reimer, Friesen, Penner and dozens of others. Russian Mennonites, particularly in Canada, have also written many well known works of literature.

== Terminology ==
Many Mennonites, particularly in Western Canada, use the term "Russian Mennonite" as term of culture or ethnicity referring to their Dutch and Prussian ancestry and heritage, even if they never lived in Russia themselves. The term, does not, however, mean that they are ethnically Russian, but refers to the country they lived in before immigrating to the Americas. "Low-German Mennonites" is also used in order to avoid this conflation.

Russian Mennonites can be further divided into several groups and labels based on immigration history. The term "Kanadier" refers to Russian Mennonites who came to Canada in the 1870s, some of whom later moved to Mexico. The label "Russlander" refers to Russian Mennonites who came to the Americas in the 1920s. Those who left Europe after World War II were often called "displaced persons" or "DPs", although this term is not specific to Mennonites. The term "Aussiedler" refers to Russian Mennonites who stayed in the Soviet Union throughout the 20th century before leaving for Germany or the Americas following the collapse of the Soviet Union.

== See also ==
- Germans in Ukraine
- Alexanderwohl Mennonite Church
- The Daily Bonnet
- General Conference Mennonite Church and U.S. Conference of Mennonite Brethren Churches
- Germans from Russia, ethnic Germans from Russia, many of whom also immigrated to the U.S. and Canada.
- German minority in Russia and Soviet Union and History of Germans in Russia and the Soviet Union
- Mennonite cuisine
- Mennonite settlements of Altai
- New Russia
- Olędrzy
- Plautdietsch (the dialect of Low German spoken by the Mennonites from Russia)
- Schmeckfest
- Silent Light
- Threshing stone
- Hard Passage: A Mennonite Family's Long Journey from Russia to Canada
- Volga Germans
