= Russian Mennonite zwieback =

Form of bread roll

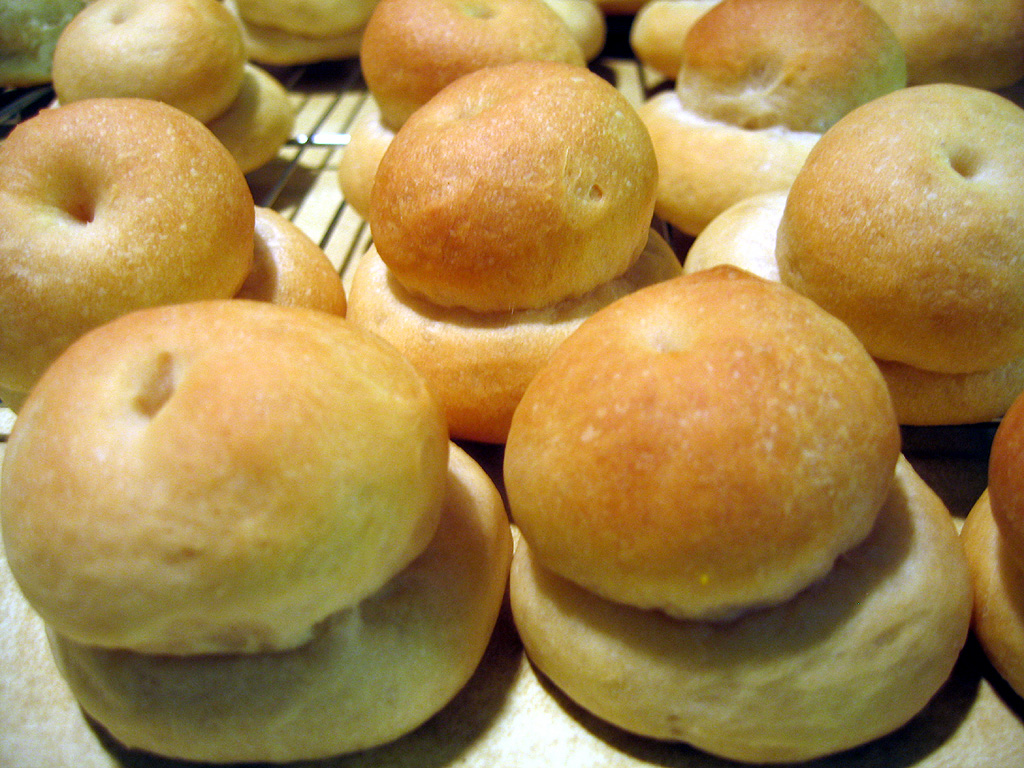
- Type: Bread roll
- Place of origin: Netherlands and West Prussia

Russian Mennonite zwieback, called Tweebak in Plautdietsch, is a yeast bread roll from Mennonite cuisine formed from two pieces of dough that are pulled apart when eaten. Placing the two balls of dough one on top of the other so that the top one does not fall off during the baking process is part of the art and challenge that must be mastered by the baker. Traditionally, this type of zwieback is baked Saturday and eaten Sunday morning and for afternoon Faspa (Standard German: Vesper), a light meal.

This zwieback originated in the port cities of the Netherlands or in Gdańsk, where toasted, dried buns were used to provision ships. Mennonite immigrants from the Netherlands, who settled around Gdańsk in West Prussia, continued this practice and brought it to Russia, when they migrated to new colonies in what is today Russia and Ukraine.

== Recipe ==
Traditionally, zwieback are made using lard instead of butter or a mixture of the two. As such, zwieback is very rich and does not need butter when being eaten, although jelly or jam both go quite well. Many zwieback recipes do not use modern units of measurement, instead relying on anecdotal measurements handed down through the generations.

== See also ==
- Russian Mennonite
- Zwieback, a type of rusk with the same name
