= Die Mennonitische Post =

Canadian German-language newspaper

Die Mennonitische Post is a German-language newspaper serving conservative Mennonites throughout the Americas.

It was founded in 1977 by the Mennonite Central Committee (MCC) to connect the Kanadier Mennonite diaspora, descendants of Mennonites who left Canada in the 1920s for Mexico and Paraguay.

== Publication and distribution ==
The paper has been published since 1977 and is printed and distributed on a biweekly basis. Each issue runs about 28 pages.

The publication is written by Mennonites, for Mennonites, and published in German in Canada. It is distributed across the Americas, especially to conservative Mennonite colonies in Latin America such as Bolivia.

== Readership and audience ==
When editor Kennert Giesbrecht began in 2002, the newspaper had about 5,000 subscribers, reaching an estimated 20,000–25,000 readers. By 2023, circulation was around 10,000 copies per issue, and readership today is estimated at 50,000.

The audience consists primarily of conservative Mennonite colonies across Latin and North America. In some colonies, the paper is the only reading material besides the Bible. Progressive colonies, which have internet access and their own publications, rely on it less.

About half of each issue consists of letters, often taking months to arrive, from colonies as far away as Peruvian Amazonia and Angola. The paper uses simple German so that readers can use it as a tool for learning to read.

The newspaper’s future is considered strong, supported by the large families typical of its readership (averaging about eight children) and their ongoing reliance on print media.

== Content and impact ==
The newspaper’s content ranges from colony news and letters to life stories, mental health articles, and pieces on community care. Editors have sought to balance tragic news with constructive, positive stories.

Its influence has been significant: it has supported literacy, opened space for conversations on sensitive topics such as depression, and acted as one of the only links to the outside world for conservative Mennonites.

Producing each issue has historically been the responsibility of a very small team—sometimes only two people handling all aspects of editing, layout, and proofreading. Reporting has required extensive travel; Giesbrecht alone spent over 500 days travelling and made more than 50 trips to report stories.

== See also ==
- Mennonite literature
- Mennonite Central Committee
