= Peter P. Klassen =

Peter P. Klassen (1926 – 29 July 2018) was a Russian Mennonite author who wrote in the German language. He fled with his parents from Soviet Russia to Paraguay, arriving there in 1931. He has had a distinguished career as the premier historian of Mennonites in South America. Klassen has also worked as a teacher and was a long-time editor of the Paraguayan Mennonite newspaper Mennoblatt.

== Selected works ==
- Die Mennoniten in Paraguay. Band 1: Reich Gottes und Reich dieser Welt (Bolanden-Weierhof, Germany 2001) ISBN 3-921881-05-6
- Kaputi Mennonita. Eine friedliche Begegnung im Chaco-Krieg (Asuncion, Paraguay 1976)
- Und ob ich schon wanderte... Geschichten zur Geschichte der Wanderung und Flucht der Mennoniten von Preussen über Russland nach Amerika (Bolanden-Weierhof, Germany 1997)
- Die schwarzen Reiter. Geschichten zur Geschichte eines Glaubensprinzips (Uchte, Germany 1999)
- So geschehen in Kronsweide (Germany 2003)
