= Mennonite Central Committee =

North American charitable organization

- Abbreviation: MCC
- Formation: September 27, 1920
- Tax ID no.: 23-6002702 (USA)
- Registration no.: 107690877RR0001 (Can.)
- Legal status: Non-profit charity
- Purpose: Relief, service, peace
- Headquarters: Akron, Pennsylvania, US; Winnipeg, Manitoba, Canada
- Revenue: US$30,562,776 (US); CA$23,369,034 (Can.) (2014)
- Staff: 1,150 (2024)
- Website: www.mcc.org

The Mennonite Central Committee (MCC) is a relief service, and peace agency representing fifteen Mennonite, Brethren in Christ and Amish bodies in North America. The U.S. headquarters are located in Akron, Pennsylvania; the Canadian headquarters is located in Winnipeg, Manitoba.

== History ==
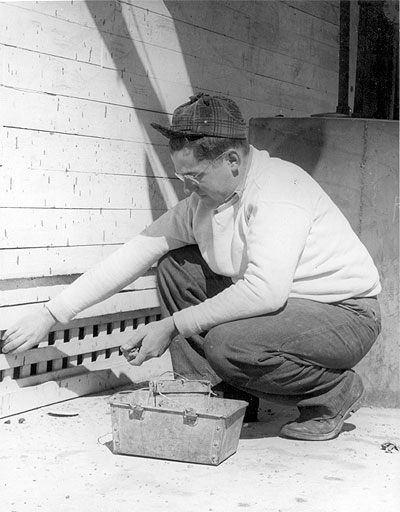
Mennonite Civilian Public Service worker Harry Lantz distributes rat poison for typhus control in Gulfport, Mississippi.

Founded in Chicago, Illinois, MCC held its first meeting on September 27, 1920. Its original goal was to provide food for Mennonites starving in Ukraine. MCC soon realized that it could not help only their Mennonite brothers and sisters and began to help anyone in need. MCC (Canada) was founded in 1963.

The initial work of MCC focused on:

1920–1925: famine relief work in Ukraine.
1925–1930: inactive
1930–1937: colonization of Russian Mennonite and Bruderhof refugees in Paraguay and Brazil.
1939–present: relief work; initially in Poland, then (1940) England and France.
1941–1947: administration of Civilian Public Service (CPS) as part of National Service Board for Religious Objectors.
1950s: administration of 1-W service, the replacement of CPS, for draftees classified as conscientious objectors.

=== Famine in Ukraine ===
The Mennonites of Molotschna sent a committee to North America in the summer of 1920 to alert American Mennonites of the dire conditions in war-torn Ukraine. Their plight succeeded in uniting various branches of Mennonites to form Mennonite Central Committee in an effort to aid these Russian Mennonites. P. C. Hiebert of the Mennonite Brethren Church initially chaired the organization, with secretary Levi Mumaw of the (Old) Mennonite Church and attorney Maxwell Kratz of the General Conference Mennonite Church. Other Mennonite conferences joined later.

The new organization planned to provide aid to Ukraine via existing Mennonite relief work in Istanbul. The Istanbul group, mainly Goshen College graduates, produced three volunteers, who at great risk entered Ukraine during the ongoing Russian Civil War. They arrived in the Mennonite village of Halbstadt just as General Wrangel of the White Army was retreating. Two of the volunteers withdrew with the Wrangel army, while Clayton Kratz, who remained in Halbstadt (Molotschna) as the Red Army overran the village, was never heard from again.

A year passed before official permission was received from the Soviet government to do relief work among the villages of Ukraine. Kitchens provided 25,000 people a day with rations over a period of three years beginning in 1922, with a peak of 40,000 servings during August of that year. Fifty Fordson tractor and plow combinations were sent to Mennonite villages to replace horses that had been stolen and confiscated during the war. This relief effort cost $1.2 million.

=== Voluntary service ===
Lois Gunden volunteered for the Mennonite Central Committee in 1941 and established an orphanage for refuge children of the Spanish Civil War and Jewish children from Rivesaltes internment camp. The children that she rescued were malnourished, in poor health, and had lice. She was awarded the title Righteous Among the Nations by Yad Vashem for her efforts to care for and protect children.

As Civilian Public Service started to wind down in 1946, MCC began exploring a peacetime service program that would continue the types of projects performed by CPS. The new program, Voluntary Service, had several aims.

It would provide young people with a way to voluntarily perform Christian service for up to a year as a means of testifying more widely to the gospel and its way of love and nonresistance. Projects were to help alleviate human need in a culturally sensitive manner. The program would operate as an internship in Christian service, developing the workers' service motivation, witness and religious conviction. It would provide Mennonite young people with an opportunity to express appreciation for the material blessings, religious and other national liberties and to contribute to the well-being of the nation. Finally, it was hoped that some individuals would decide to devote their careers to full-time ministry or missionary service.

The first Voluntary Service unit started during the summer of 1946 in association with the CPS unit at Gulfport, Mississippi.

== Activities ==
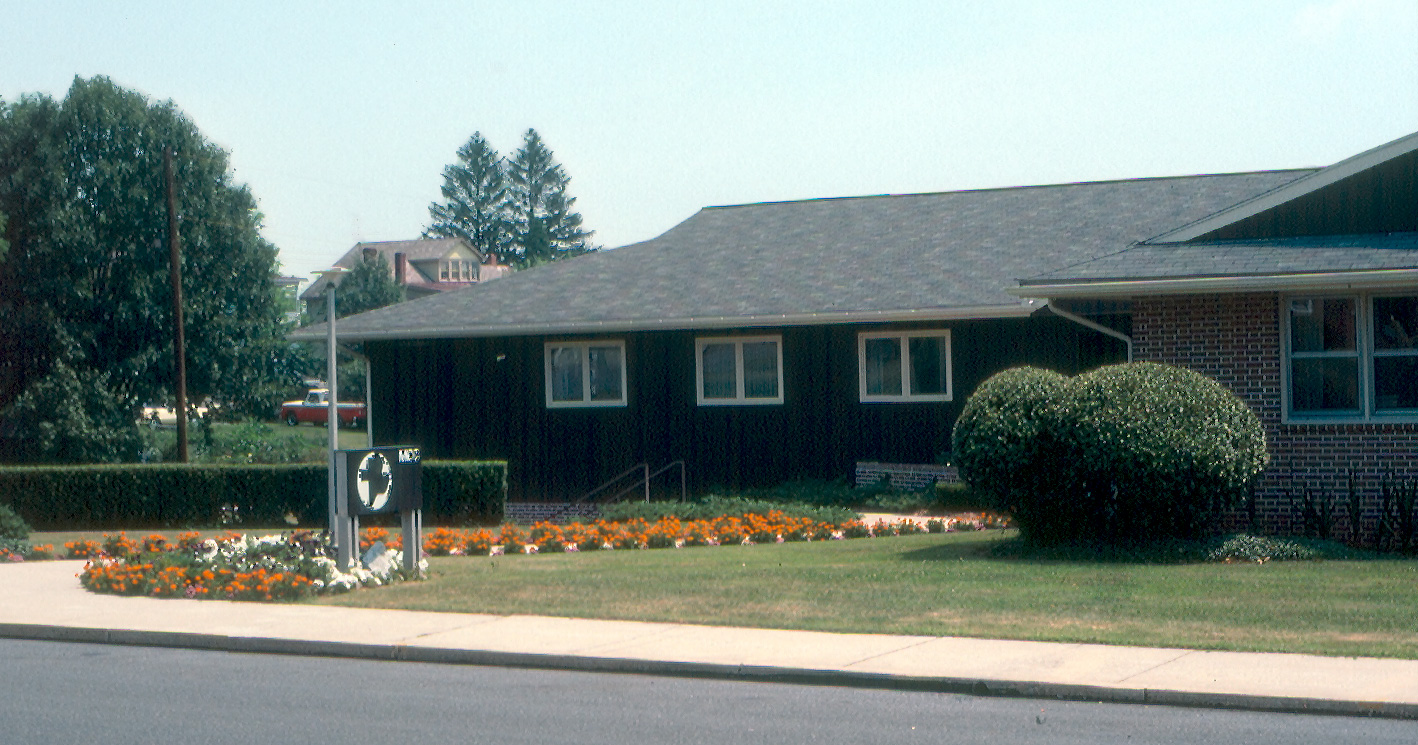
Akron, Pennsylvania, headquarters, August 1982.

MCC was an early proponent of fair trade through its Ten Thousand Villages program.

Funds for MCC's worldwide relief and service projects are raised through independent Mennonite relief sales. Around 45 sales are held throughout the United States and Canada, raising US$5 million annually. Many of these sales feature quilts handmade by Mennonite and Amish volunteers, auctions, artwork, crafted woodwork, homemade foods, antiques, crafts, plants, children's activities, and musical programs. Most of the goods and labor are donated, and 78.2% of the funds raised go directly into the field.

MCC focuses its development efforts in areas such as food security and livelihoods, health, education, peace and justice, and fair trade. It responds to disaster situations, as well as focusing its efforts on the longer-term issues of economic and social policy.

MCC maintains offices in both Washington, D.C., and Ottawa to advocate to the American and Canadian federal governments, respectively. MCC also has an international advocacy office at the United Nations in New York City. As of 2015, Ewuare Osayande served as the group's Anti-Oppression Coordinator.

MCC publishes Die Mennonitische Post, a German-language newspaper serving Mennonites throughout the Americas.

=== Peacemaking ===
MCC also takes an active role in advocating for peace both in North America and around the world, seeking "to be a witness against forces that contribute to poverty, injustice and violence." In North America, MCC established the Mennonite Conciliation Service (MCS) in 1979 to encourage Mennonites and others to actively pursue peaceful resolution of conflicts. MCS was a pioneer in the burgeoning field of conflict resolution in the 1980s and director Ronald S. Kraybill led early mediation workshops in Northern Ireland which eventually led to the establishment of the Northern Ireland Mediation Network. John Paul Lederach took over MCS in 1989 when Kraybill moved on to South Africa, and in the years following, MCC moved active peace building into the forefront of its work abroad.

Responding in part to the establishment of active Mennonite-led peace centers that had emerged in the 80s and 90s, such as the Conflict Transformation Program at Eastern Mennonite University, the Lombard Mennonite Peace Center in Lombard, Illinois, a group of peace builders at Fresno Pacific University, the Peace and Justice Network of the Mennonite Church and other activities, MCS was discontinued in 2004. But the Peace Office of MCC continues to advocate peace interests broadly in the US and in MCC programming abroad. Internationally, MCC partners with local organizations to reduce violence in the aftermath of conflict or war.

MCC advocates for exemption from military service. Alternative service for conscientious objectors is promoted as their witness to New Testament Scriptures. MCC keeps a "conscientious objector registry" in Canada, taking statements from Canadians in the hope that they will be recognized by the Canadian government should the government restart drafting citizens into the military.

== Affiliated organizations ==
- Beachy Amish Mennonite Churches
- Brethren in Christ Church
- Canadian Conference of Mennonite Brethren Churches
- Mennonite Church Canada
- Mennonite Church USA
- Mennonite Disaster Service
- U.S. Conference of Mennonite Brethren Churches
- Rosedale Network of Churches

== See also ==
- More-with-Less Cookbook
