= Am Trakt Colony =

Coordinates: 51°2′N 46°23′E

- Interactive map of Am Trakt Colony
- Country: Russian Empire
- Governorate: Samara Governorate
- First settled: 1853
- Population transfer in the Soviet Union: 1941
- Founder: Claas Epp Sr and Johann Wall

Area
  - Total: 17,300 ha (42,800 acres)

Population (1929)
  - Total: 2,000
  - Density: 12/km^{2} (30/sq mi)

The Am Trakt Colony was a Mennonite settlement in the former governorate of Samara of the Russian Empire on the Volga River. The settlement was established in 1853 by Mennonites from the Vistula Delta in Prussia.

== History ==
The first 22 families left Prussia in the fall of 1853 and first spent some time in the Molotschna Colony until the delegates had located the land for the settlement. In the fall of 1853 the first 9 families coming directly from Prussia, arrived in the village of Privolynaya and wintered there. In the spring they established the villages of Hahnsau, Köppental, Lysanderhof, Orloff, Valuyevka, Ostenfeld and Medemtal.

Village	Founded	Dissolved	Population 1897
Hahnsau	1854		
Köppental	1855		201
Lindenau	1856-59		174
Fresenheim	1856-59		103
Hohendorf	1862		96
Lysanderhöh	1864		119
Orloff	1871		80
Valuyevka	1875		57
Osterfeld	1872		127
Medemtal	1872		219

The colony initially consisted of 37,800 acres and later they purchased an additional 5,000 acres for the young families.

The village of Fresenheim was founded around 1860 and was named after the chief judge in the Office of Immigrant Oversight in Saratov. During the Russification renaming efforts from 1914-1916 the village was renamed Sukhodolnoye meaning "waterless".

In 1880-81 the settlers of Hahnsau and families from other villages moved to Central Asia. Specifically to the Emirate of Bukhara and the Khanate of Khiva.

In 1918 the Volga German Autonomous Soviet Socialist Republic was established and the Am Trakt Colony became a part of this autonomous republic. Between the World Wars multiple families migrated to Canada. Around 1929 the communist programs became stricter and many of the Mennonite leaders were exiled. When Nazi Germany invaded the Russian Empire in 1941 the Volga Republic was automatically dissolved and most of the population exiled to Siberia.
