= List of hospitals in Manitoba =

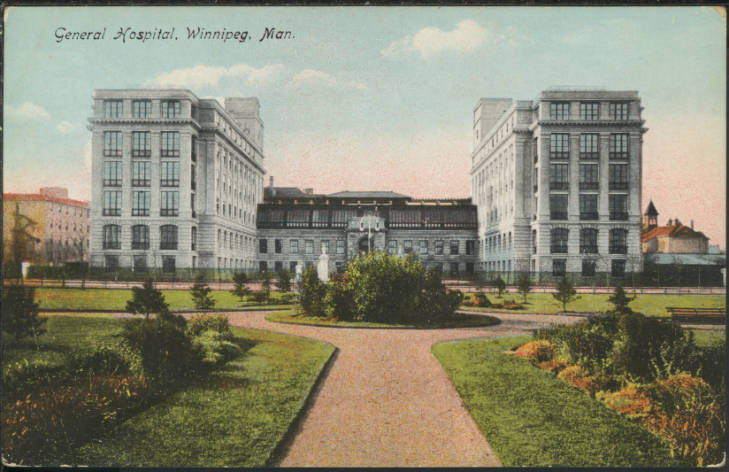
Winnipeg General Hospital, c. 1913. The building is now part of the Health Sciences Centre.

Hospitals and health centres in Manitoba are under the purview of the provincial government's Department of Health and Seniors Care. Most direct health services in Manitoba are delivered through regional health authorities.

== Interlake-Eastern Manitoba ==
Location	Hospital
Arborg	Arborg Hospital (Arborg & Districts Health Centre)
Ashern	Ashern - Lakeshore General Hospital
Beausejour	Beausejour Hospital
Eriksdale	E.M. Crowe Memorial Hospital
Gimli	Gimli - Johnson Memorial Hospital
Grandview	Grandview Health Centre
Hodgson	Percy E. Moore Hospital
Pinawa	Pinawa Hospital
Pine Falls	Pine Falls Health Complex: Pine Falls Hospital
Selkirk	Selkirk & District General Hospital
Selkirk	Selkirk Mental Health Centre
Selkirk	Selkirk Regional Health Centre
Stonewall	Dr. Evelyn Memorial Hospital (Stonewall & District Health Centre)
Teulon	Teulon - Hunter Memorial Hospital

== Northern Manitoba ==
Location	Hospital
Churchill	Churchill Health Centre*
Cormorant	Cormorant Health Care Centre
Flin Flon	Flin Flon General Hospital
Gillam	Gillam Hospital
Ilford	Ilford Community Health Centre
Leaf Rapids	Leaf Rapids Health Centre
Lynn Lake	Lynn Lake Hospital
Norway House	Norway House Community Clinic
Norway House	Norway House Hospital
Opaskwayak	Beatrice Wilson Health Centre
The Pas	St. Anthony's Hospital
Sherridon	Sherridon Health Centre
Snow Lake	Snow Lake Health Centre
Thicket Portage	Health Centre
Thompson	Acute Brain Injury House
Thompson	Thompson General Hospital
Wabowden	Wabowden Community Health Centre

* Despite being located in Northern Manitoba, Churchill Health Centre is overseen by the Winnipeg Regional Health Authority.

== Southern Manitoba ==
Location	Hospital
Altona	Altona Community Memorial Health Centre / Eastview Place
Carman	Carman Memorial Hospital
Crystal City	Rock Lake Health District Hospital
Emerson	Emerson Health Centre
Gladstone	Gladstone Health Centre
MacGregor	MacGregor Health Centre
Manitou	Pembina Manitou Health Centre
Morris	Morris General Hospital
Notre Dame de Lourdes	Centre de santé Notre-Dame Health Centre
Portage la Prairie	Portage District General Hospital
St. Claude	Centre de santé St. Claude Health Centre
St. Pierre-Jolys	Centre médico-social De Salaberry District Health Centre
Ste. Anne	Hôpital Ste-Anne Hospital
Steinbach	Bethesda Regional Health Centre
Swan Lake	Lorne Memorial Hospital
Vita	Vita & District Health Centre
Winkler/Morden	Boundary Trails Health Centre
Winkler/Morden	Eden Mental Health Centre

== Western Manitoba ==
Location	Hospital
Boissevain	Boissevain Health Centre
Brandon	Brandon Regional Health Centre
Cartwright	Davidson Memorial Health Centre
Dauphin	Dauphin Regional Health Centre
Killarney	Tri-Lake Health Centre
Minnedosa	Minnedosa Health Centre
Neepawa	Neepawa Health Centre
Roblin	Roblin District Health Centre
Sainte Rose du Lac	Ste. Rose General Hospital
Shoal Lake	Shoal Lake/Strathclair Health Centre
Swan River	Swan Valley Health Centre
Virden	Virden Health Centre
Wawanesa	Wawanesa Health Centre

== Winnipeg ==
Hospitals and health centres in the Winnipeg area:

- Breast Health Centre
- CancerCare Manitoba
- Concordia Hospital
- Deer Lodge Centre
- Grace General Hospital
- Health Sciences Centre (HSC)
  - HSC Winnipeg Children's Hospital
  - HSC Winnipeg Women's Hospital
  - Winnipeg General Hospital
  - Winnipeg Rehab Respiratory Hospital
- Misericordia Health Centre
- Riverview Health Centre
- Saint Boniface General Hospital
- Seven Oaks General Hospital
  - Kildonan Medical Centre
- Victoria General Hospital
- Western Surgery Centre

== See also ==
- Manitoba Health
- University of Manitoba College of Medicine
- COVID-19 pandemic in Manitoba
- List of hospitals in Canada
- Healthcare in Canada
