= Life support =

Emergency medical treatment

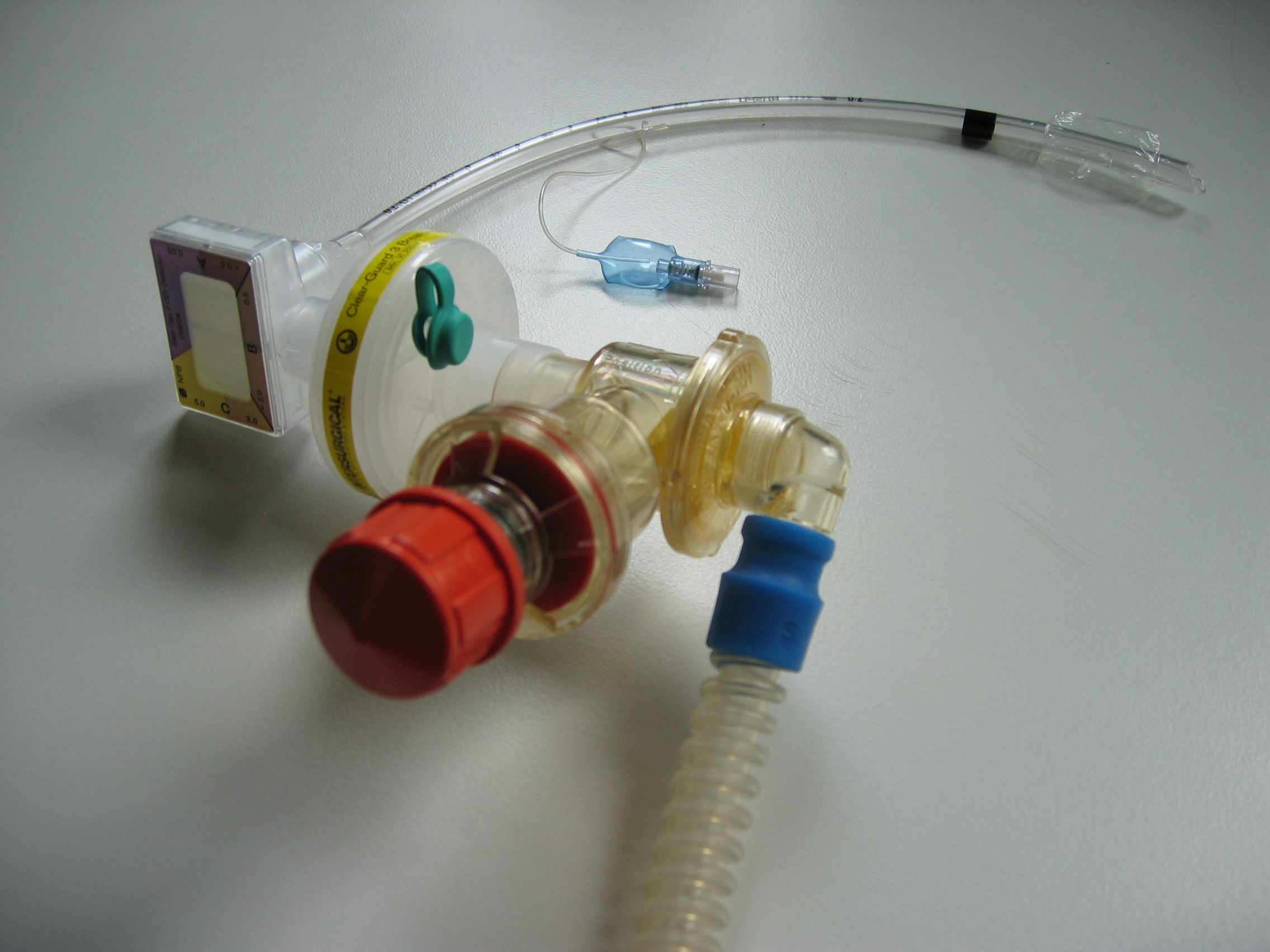
- Endotracheal tube of an emergency ventilator system
- Specialty: Emergency medicine, intensive care medicine

Life support comprises the treatments and techniques performed in an emergency in order to support life after the failure of one or more vital organs. Healthcare providers and emergency medical technicians are generally certified to perform basic and advanced life-support procedures; however, basic life support is sometimes provided at the scene of an emergency by family members or bystanders before emergency services arrive. In the case of cardiac injuries, cardiopulmonary resuscitation is initiated by bystanders or family members 25% of the time. Basic life-support techniques, such as performing CPR on a victim of cardiac arrest, can double or even triple that patient's chance of survival. Other types of basic life support include relief from choking (which can be done by using the Heimlich maneuver), staunching of bleeding by direct compression and elevation above the heart (and if necessary, pressure on arterial pressure points and the use of a manufactured or improvised tourniquet), first aid, and the use of an automated external defibrillator.

The purpose of basic life support (abbreviated BLS) is to save lives in a variety of different situations that require immediate attention. These situations can include, but are not limited to, cardiac arrest, stroke, drowning, choking, accidental injuries, violence, severe allergic reactions, burns, hypothermia, birth complications, drug addiction, and alcohol intoxication. The most common emergency that requires BLS is cerebral hypoxia, a shortage of oxygen to the brain due to heart or respiratory failure. A victim of cerebral hypoxia may die within 8–10 minutes without basic life-support procedures. BLS is the lowest level of emergency care, followed by advanced life support and critical care.

== Bioethics ==
As technology continues to advance within the medical field, so do the options available for healthcare. Out of respect for the patient's autonomy, patients and their families are able to make their own decisions about life-sustaining treatment or whether to hasten death. When patients and their families are forced to make decisions concerning life support as a form of end-of-life or emergency treatment, ethical dilemmas often arise. When a patient is terminally ill or seriously injured, medical interventions can save or prolong the life of the patient. Because such treatment is available, families are often faced with the moral question of whether or not to treat the patient. Much of the struggle concerns the ethics of letting someone die when they can be kept alive versus keeping someone alive, possibly without their consent. Between 60 and 70% of seriously ill patients will not be able to decide for themselves whether or not they want to limit treatments, including life-support measures. This leaves these difficult decisions up to loved ones and family members.

Patients and family members who wish to limit the treatment provided to the patient may complete a do not resuscitate (DNR) or do not intubate (DNI) order with their doctor. These orders state that the patient does not wish to receive these forms of life support. Generally, DNRs and DNIs are justified for patients who might not benefit from CPR, who would result in permanent damage from CPR or patients who have a poor quality of life prior to CPR or intubation and do not wish to prolong the dying process.

Another type of life support that presents ethical arguments is the placement of a feeding tube. Decisions about hydration and nutrition are generally the most ethically challenging when it comes to end-of-life care. In 1990, the US Supreme Court ruled that artificial nutrition and hydration are not different from other life-supporting treatments. Because of this, artificial nutrition and hydration can be refused by a patient or their family. A person cannot live without food and water, and because of this, it has been argued that withholding food and water is similar to the act of killing the patient or even allowing the person to die. This type of voluntary death is referred to as passive euthanasia.

In addition to patients and their families, doctors also are confronted with ethical questions. In addition to patient life, doctors have to consider medical resource allocations. They have to decide whether one patient is a worthwhile investment of limited resources versus another. Current ethical guidelines are vague since they center on moral issues of ending medical care but disregard discrepancies between those who understand possible treatments and how the patient's wishes are understood and integrated into the final decision. Physicians often ignore treatments they deem ineffective, causing them to make more decisions without consulting the patient or representatives. However, when they decide against medical treatment, they must keep the patient or representatives informed even if they discourage continued life support. Whether the physician decides to continue to terminate life-support therapy depends on their own ethical beliefs. These beliefs concern the patient's independence, consent, and the efficacy and value of continued life support. In a prospective study conducted by T J Predergast and J M Luce from 1987 to 1993, when physicians recommended withholding or withdrawing life support, 90% of the patients agreed to the suggestion and only 4% refused. When the patient disagreed with the physician, the doctor complied and continued support with one exception. If the doctor believed the patient was hopelessly ill, they did not fulfill the surrogate's request for resuscitation. In a survey conducted by Jean-Louis Vincent MD, PhD in 1999, it was found that of European intensivists working in the Intensive Care Unit, 93% of physicians occasionally withhold treatment from those they considered hopeless. Withdrawal of treatment was less common. For these patients, 40% of the physicians gave large doses of drugs until the patient died. All of the physicians were members of the European Society of Intensive Care Medicine.

== Case studies ==
=== Sawatzky vs. Riverview Health Center Inc., November 1998 ===
Mr. Sawatsky had Parkinson's disease and had been a patient at the Riverview Health Centre, Manitoba, Canada since May 28, 1998. When he was admitted to the hospital, the attending physician decided that if he went into cardiac arrest, he should not be resuscitated. Mrs. Sawatsky opposed the decision and the doctor complied. Later, the doctor decided that the patient needed a cuffed tracheotomy tube, which Mrs. Sawatsky opposed. In response, the hospital applied to have a Public Trustee become the patient's legal guardian and the Trustee consented to the operation. In late October, without consulting another physician or the patient's wife, the physician again made a "do not resuscitate" order after the patient developed pneumonia. Mrs. Sawatzky went to court for an interim order to remove the DNR. The "do not resuscitate" order was withdrawn.

In the case law to date in 1988, the courts decided that a decision to withhold or withdraw treatment was only for the physician to make, not the courts. However, the Manitoba court decided that given the scarcity of related cases and how none of them considered the Canadian Charter of Rights and Freedoms, it would try the case. Previous courts had held that physicians should not be bound by law to provide treatment that they did not believe the patient would want. Otherwise, the physician would be acting against his conscience and his duty as a physician. However, if the patient disagreed, they can sue the physician for negligence. To avoid this, Justice Beard ruled in favor of the patient. Resuscitation is not controversial and only requires CPR, which would be performed by the first qualified person on the scene. Even if resuscitation was an ethical dilemma, it was minor given that the doctor had allowed resuscitation for several months already. In contrast with related cases in which patients were comatose, Mrs. Sawatzky provided evidence that her husband was able to communicate and believed that he could recover, but the doctor disagreed. The uncertainty of recovery pushed the Court to order the physician to allow resuscitation. Where rulings discuss end of life issues, the question is more, "Is continued life a benefit to this person" instead of, "Is it possible to treat this person". These questions are beyond the scope of the medical profession and can be answered philosophically or religiously, which is also what builds our sense of justice. Both philosophy and religion value life as a basic right for humans, rather than as the ability to contribute to society, and purposely encompasses all people. Mr. Sawatzky fell under the umbrella, so the judge ruled in his favor.

=== Airedale NHS Trust v. Bland (1993) ===
The Airedale NHS Trust v. Bland case was an English House of Lords decision for a 17-year-old comatose survivor of the Hillsborough disaster. He had been artificially fed and hydrated via life support for about three years, but he had not shown any improvement while in his persistent vegetative state. His parents challenged the therapeutic life support at the High Court and wanted permission to end life support for their son. The Court decided that his "existence in a persistent vegetative state is not a benefit to the patient," but the statement did not cover the innate value of human life. The court interpreted the sanctity of life as only applicable when life could continue in the way that the patient would have wanted to live their life. If the quality of life did not fall within what the patient valued as a meaningful life, then sanctity of life did not apply. The accuracy of a proxy's decision about how to treat a patient is influenced by what the patient would have wanted for themselves. However, just because the patient wanted to die did not mean the courts would allow physicians to assist and medically kill a patient. This part of the decision was influenced by the case Rodriguez (1993) in which a British Columbian woman with amyotrophic lateral sclerosis could not secure permission for assisted suicide.

== Techniques ==
There are many therapies and techniques that may be used by clinicians to achieve the goal of sustaining life. Some examples include:

- Feeding tube
- Total parenteral nutrition
- Mechanical ventilation
- Heart/Lung bypass
- Urinary catheterization
- Dialysis
- Cardiopulmonary resuscitation
- Defibrillation
- Artificial pacemaker

These techniques are applied most commonly in the Emergency Department, Intensive Care Unit and Operating Rooms. As various life-support technologies have improved and evolved they are used increasingly outside of the hospital environment. For example, a patient who requires a ventilator for survival is commonly discharged home with these devices. Another example includes the now-ubiquitous presence of automated external defibrillators in public venues which allow lay people to deliver life support in a prehospital environment.

The ultimate goals of life support depend on the specific patient situation. Typically, life support is used to sustain life while the underlying injury or illness is being treated or evaluated for prognosis. Life-support techniques may also be used indefinitely if the underlying medical condition cannot be corrected, but a reasonable quality of life can still be expected.

== Gallery ==
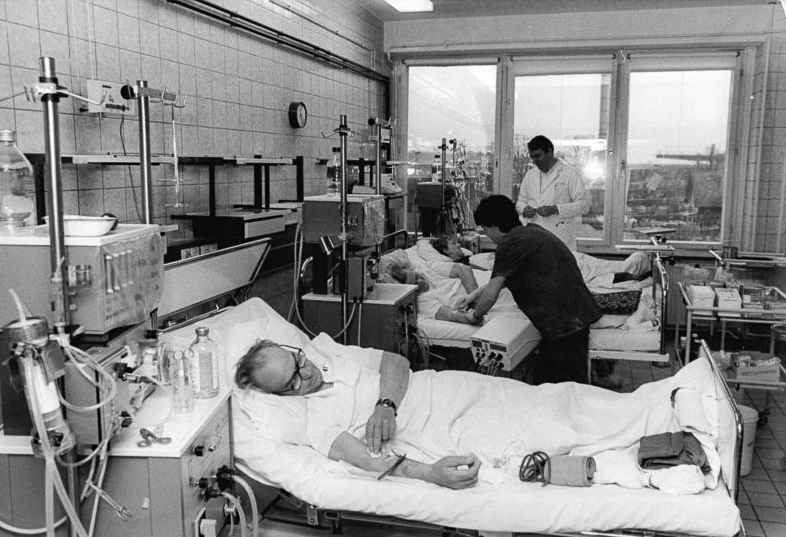
Dialysis center for patients with severe chronic kidney disease

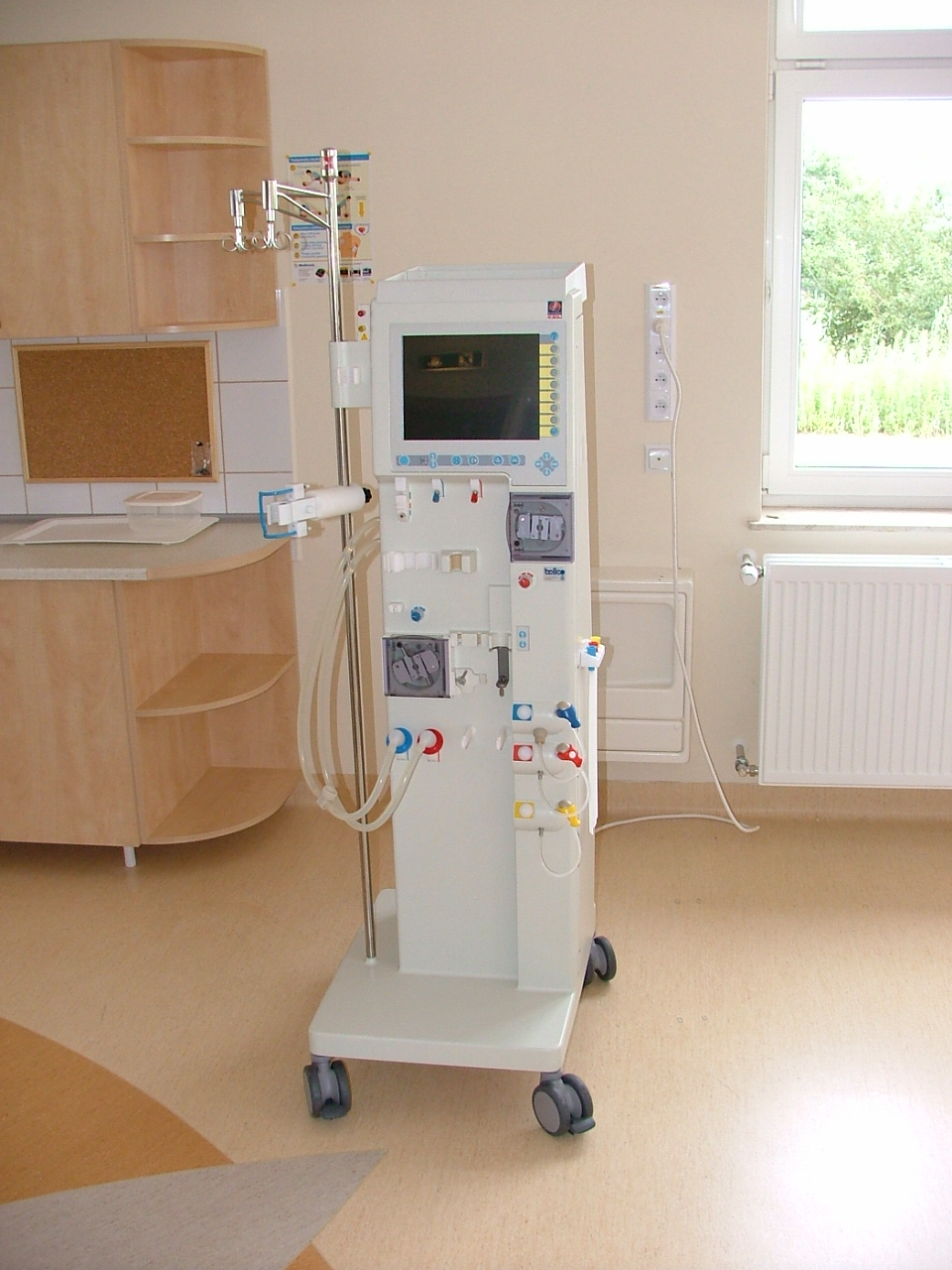
Hemodialysis machine Bellco Formula

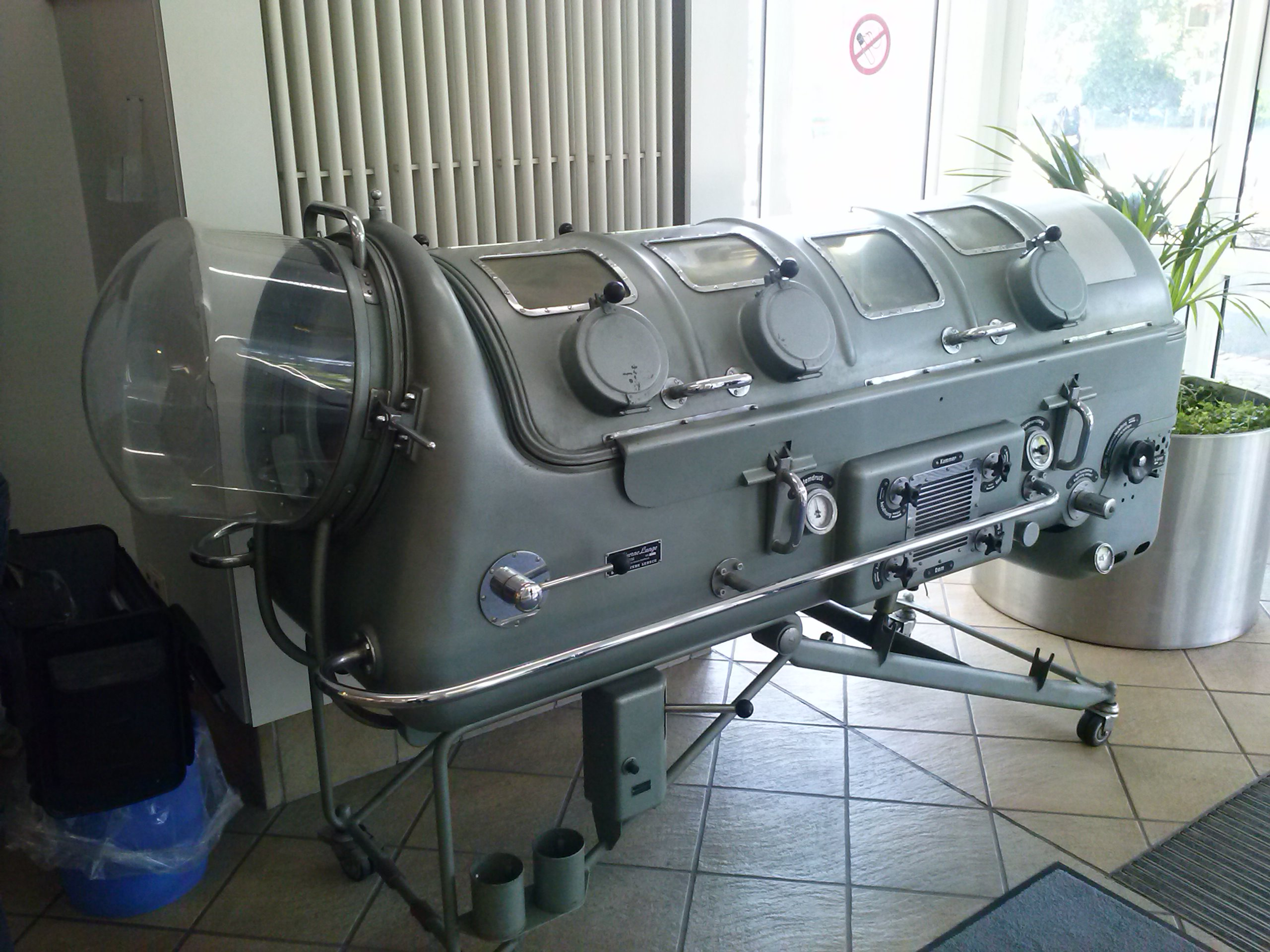
An iron lung

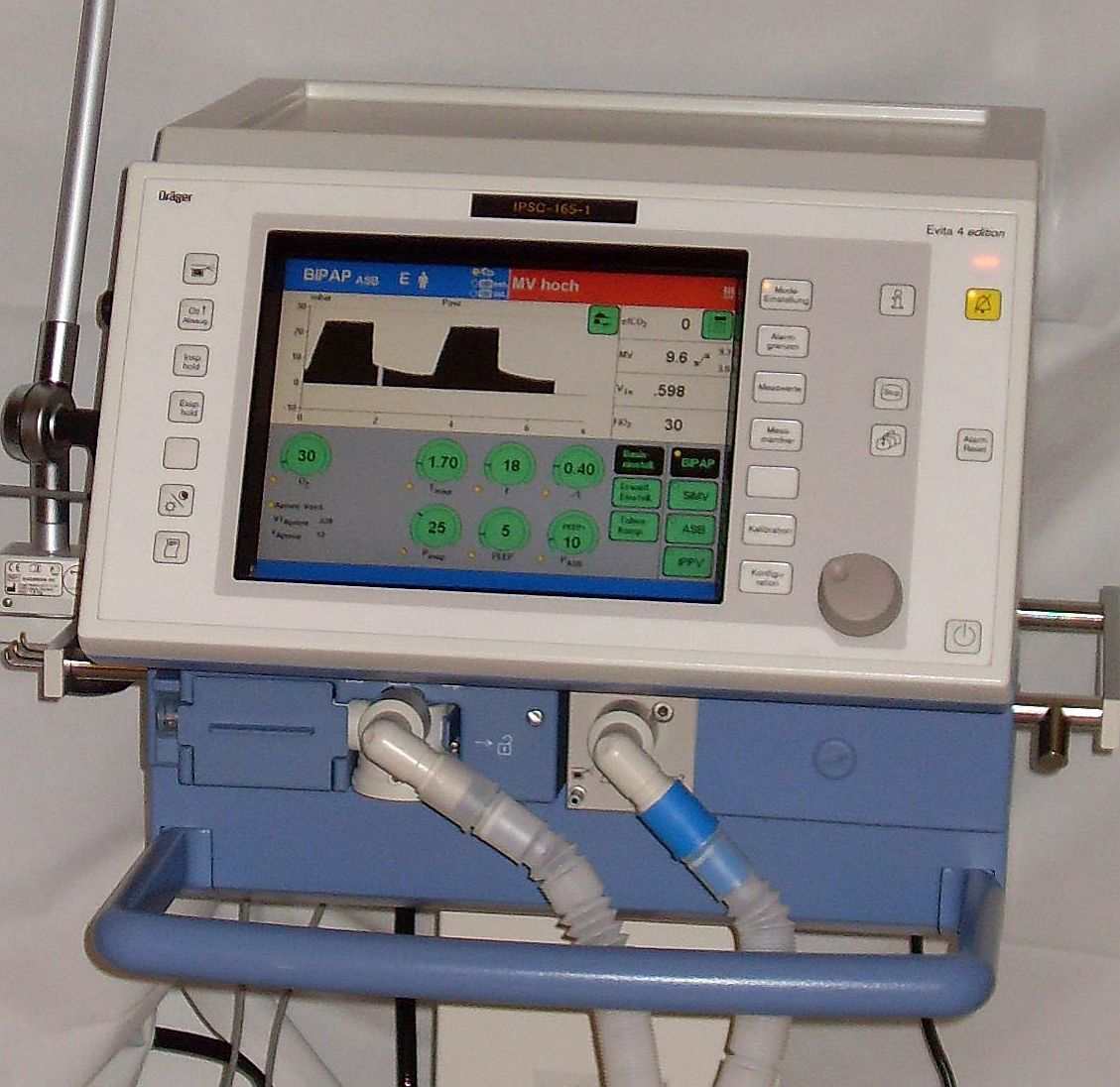
Ventilator "Evita4" on an ICU

== See also ==
- Life extension
