= VGH =

VGH may refer to any of:

- Vancouver General Hospital in Vancouver, British Columbia
- the Supreme Administrative Court of Austria, in German Verwaltungsgerichtshof
- Verwaltungsgerichtshof, a high administrative court in the Judiciary of Germany
- Victoria General Hospital (Victoria, British Columbia) in Victoria, British Columbia
- Victoria General Hospital (Winnipeg) in Winnipeg, Manitoba
- Volksgerichtshof, the People's Court of Nazi Germany

== See also ==
- Queen Elizabeth II Health Sciences Centre in Halifax, Nova Scotia, formerly named Victoria General Hospital
