= Economy of Manitoba =

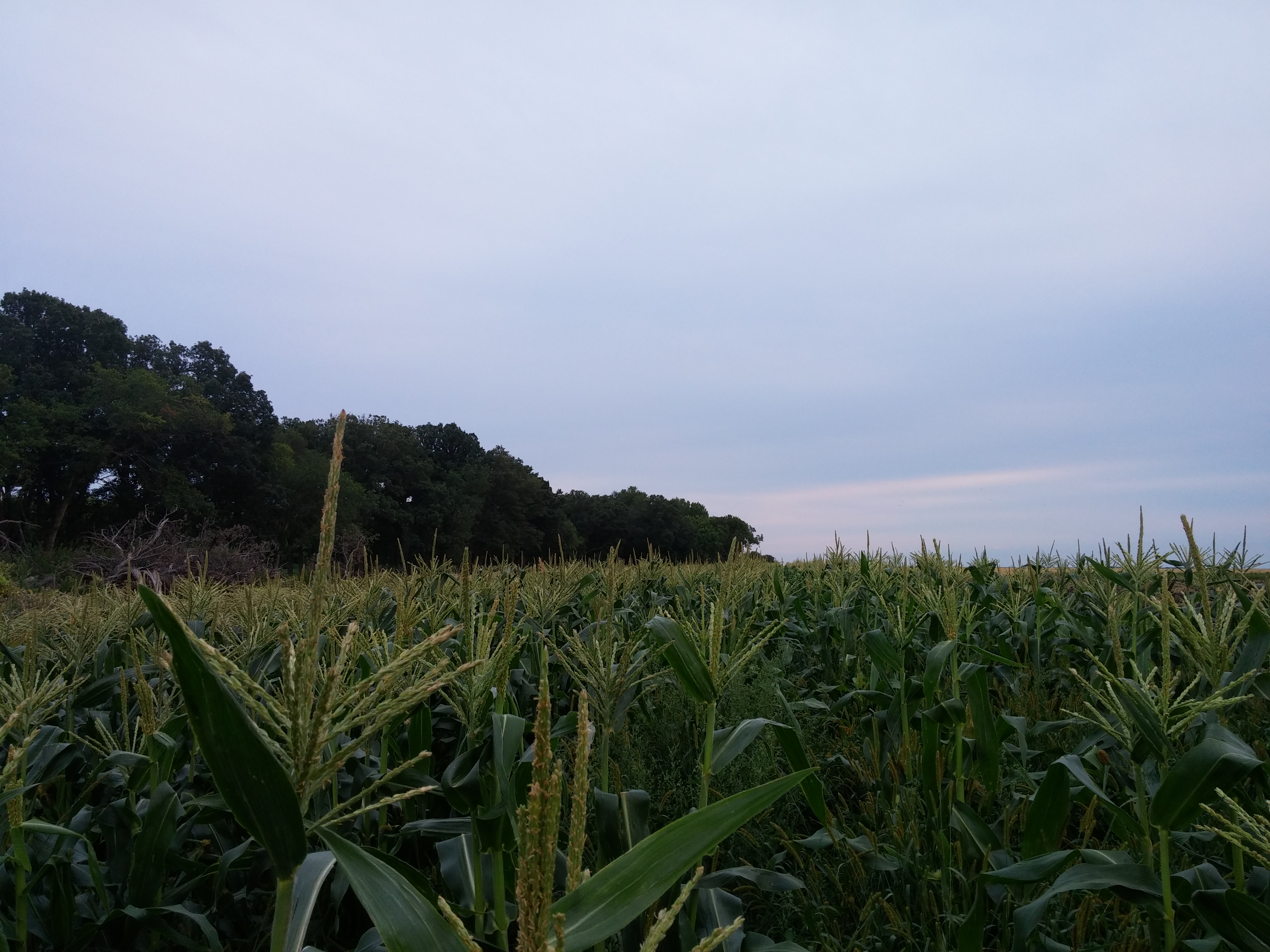
- Corn field in southern Manitoba

Statistics
- GDP: C$71.019 billion (nominal; 2017)
- GDP growth: 3.2% (2017)
- GDP per capita: C$51,484.89
- Inflation (CPI): 1.2% (2015)

External
- Exports: C$13.7 billion (2015)
- Imports: C$20.9 billion (2015)
- All values, unless otherwise stated, are in US dollars.

The economy of Manitoba is a market economy based largely on natural resources. Agriculture, mostly concentrated in the fertile southern and western parts of the province, is vital to the province's economy. Other major industries are transportation, manufacturing, mining, forestry, energy, and tourism.

The province's economic history dates to before European contact, and was originally based on a First Nations trading network. European traders arrived in the seventeenth century and organized a trans-Atlantic fur trade. Agricultural settlers arrived in the early nineteenth century, and Manitoba became a province of Canada in 1870.

== Economic history ==
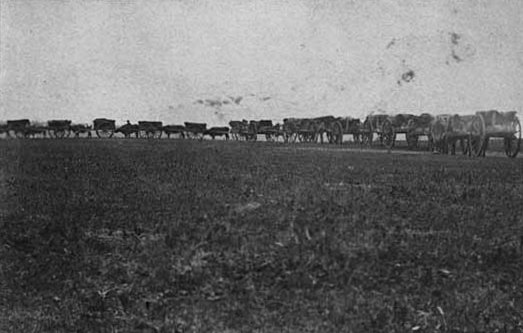
Red River cart train.

Manitoba's early economy depended on mobility and living off the land. Indigenous (Cree, Ojibwa, Dene, Sioux and Assiniboine) followed herds of bison and congregated to trade with each other at key meeting places throughout the province. After the arrival of the first European traders in the seventeenth century, the economy centred on the trade of beaver pelts and other furs. Diversification of the economy came when Lord Selkirk brought the first agricultural settlers in 1811, though the triumph of the Hudson's Bay Company (HBC) over its competitors ensured the primacy of the fur trade over widespread agricultural colonization.

HBC control of Rupert's Land ended in 1868; when Manitoba became a province in 1870, all land became the property of the federal government, with homesteads granted to settlers for farming. Transcontinental railways were constructed to simplify trade. Manitoba's economy depended mainly on farming, which persisted until drought and the Great Depression led to further diversification.

== Modern economy ==
Manitoba has a moderately strong economy based largely on natural resources. Its Gross Domestic Product was C$71 billion in 2017. The province's economy grew 2.22% from 2015 to 2016. The average individual income in Manitoba in 2016 was C$51,484.89 As of August 2019, Manitoba's unemployment rate was 5.6%.

Manitoba's economy relies heavily on agriculture, tourism, energy, oil, mining, and forestry. Agriculture is vital and is found mostly in the southern half of the province, although grain farming occurs as far north as The Pas. Around 12% of Canadian farmland is located in Manitoba. The most common agricultural activity is cattle farming (34.6%), followed by assorted grains (19.0%) and oilseed (7.9%). Manitoba is the nation's largest producer of sunflower seed and dry beans, and one of the leading sources of potatoes. Portage la Prairie is a major potato processing center, and is home to the McCain Foods and Simplot plants, which provide French fries for McDonald's, Wendy's, and other commercial chains. Richardson Milling, one of the largest oat mills in the world, also has a plant in the municipality.

Manitoba's largest employers are government and government-funded institutions, including crown corporations and services like hospitals and universities. Major private-sector employers are The Great-West Life Assurance Company, Cargill Ltd., and James Richardson and Sons Ltd. Manitoba also has large manufacturing and tourism sectors. Churchill's Arctic wildlife is a major tourist attraction; the town is a world capital for polar bear and beluga whale watchers. Manitoba is the only province with an Arctic deep-water seaport, which links to the shortest shipping route between North America, Europe and Asia.

== Key industries ==
In 2015, Manitoba's economy had the following relative weighting by industry, as a percentage value of GDP

- 11% Trade
- 10% Manufacturing
- 10% Finance, insurance and real estate
- 9% Construction
- 8% Government
- 6% Transportation and warehousing
- 5% Mining and other primary
- 4% Information, culture, arts and entertainment
- 3% Agriculture
- 3% Utilities
- 31% Other services
