= Winnipeg Regional Health Authority =

Governing healthcare body in Manitoba, Canada

- Office régional de la santé de Winnipeg
- Formation: 1999; 27 years ago
- Headquarters: 650 Main Street, Winnipeg, Manitoba
- Official language: English, French
- President and CEO: Jane Curtis (Interim)
- Chief Medical Officer: Joss Reimer
- Key people: Mary Anne Lynch (Acting Chief Nursing Officer and Chief Health Operations Officer); Vacant (Chief Health Operations Officer)
- Budget: $1.9 b CAD (2020)
- Staff: 27,000
- Website: www.wrha.mb.ca

The Winnipeg Regional Health Authority (WRHA; French: Office régional de la santé de Winnipeg, ORSW) is the governing body for healthcare regulation for the City of Winnipeg, the northern community of Churchill, and the Rural Municipalities of East and West St. Paul, in the Canadian province of Manitoba. The WRHA also provides health-care support and specialty referral services to those Manitobans who live out of these boundaries, as well as residents of northwestern Ontario and Nunavut.

The Winnipeg health region is divided into 12 community areas for the purpose of aiding the delivery of health services. Operating or funding more than 200 health service facilities and programs, the WRHA is the largest of the five regional health authorities (RHAs) in Manitoba. More particularly, the WRHA consists of 35 personal care homes, 12 community health agencies, 20 community health offices, 2 tertiary hospitals, 4 community hospitals, and 4 long-term care centres.

In October 2008, the Winnipeg Free Press announced that WRHA was named one of Manitoba's Top Employers; and, as of 2021, it employs over 14,000 people.

As of 2009, the WRHA also publishes a bi-monthly health and wellness magazine, called Wave. Beginning publication in 2009, Wave moved to being an online-only magazine in 2017. Brian Cole was the editor of the magazine at the time.

== Communities and demographics ==
The WRHA serves the city of Winnipeg, the northern community of Churchill, and the Rural Municipalities of East and West St. Paul; and also provide health-care support and specialty referral services to those Manitobans who live out of these boundaries, as well as residents of northwestern Ontario and Nunavut.

The Winnipeg health region, which includes 230 neighborhoods and over 1,000 census dissemination areas, is subdivided into 12 community areas for the purpose of aiding the delivery of health services.

Aboriginal people make up 11.0% of the region's residents in private households (4.5% First Nations, 0.1% Inuit, and 6.3% Métis). Moreover, 1 in 5 residents of the region are immigrants and 1 in 5 residents are visible minorities.

Between 2007 and 2011, circulatory system, cancer, and respiratory system were the top three causes of mortality (67% of all deaths) in the region; these three along with injury & poisoning, mental illness, endocrine & metabolic, digestive system, nervous system, genitourinary & breast, and infectious diseases were the top ten causes of mortality (96%) in the region.

Many medical services and procedures are only available in Winnipeg hospitals. In 2011/12, 57% of residents of Churchill travelled to Winnipeg for hospitalizations and 5% went to hospitals in other RHAs or other provinces. The WRHA found that around one third of patients in Winnipeg hospitals arrive from other RHAs in the province or from another province (due to hospital catchment).

== Administration ==
Established in December 1999, the WRHA is composed of health-care providers and management professionals who coordinate, manage, deliver, allocate funds to and evaluate health care and health promotion in Winnipeg. It receives funding from the Government of Manitoba each year to pay for the delivery of health service, and reports through a Board of Directors directly to the Minister of Health, both equally accountable to the public.

Among the first 10 employees to work at the WRHA when it was created in 1997, Réal Cloutier became WRHA CEO around 2017 and became president in October 2018 after holding an interim role for the position for the 16 months prior. On 10 January 2020, Cloutier officially retired as the WRHA's President and CEO. The current WRHA Chief Medical Officer, Dr Joss Reimer took the position on April 18, 2022. In 2021, WRHA's board of directors chair, Wayne McWhirter, stepped down after reportedly travelling to the United States during the COVID-19 pandemic.

The WRHA operates or funds more than 200 health service facilities and programs, and consists of 35 personal care homes, 12 community health agencies, 20 community health offices, 2 tertiary hospitals, 4 community hospitals, and 4 long-term care centres.

In the 2019/20 fiscal year, the WRHA spent a total of CA$57.41 million to fund 13 community health agencies, 12 of which belonging to the Manitoba Association of Community Health (MACH). Also in that year, the WRHA funded a total of $14.5 million to 74 additional agencies, which delivered services in the program areas of: cardiac rehabilitation, community development, home care, housing support services, mental health, primary care, disabilities services, senior centres, and other senior support services.

== Facilities ==
The WRHA operates or funds more than 200 health service facilities and programs, and consists of 35 personal care homes, 20 community health offices, 2 tertiary hospitals, 4 community hospitals, and 4 long-term care centres; as well as supporting the Manitoba Association of Community Health (MACH), which includes 12 community health agencies. The services of these agencies are focused on delivering primary care, which typically include mental health services as well.

Specialty services provided include pre- and post-natal care, HIV treatment, crisis intervention, occupational therapy, rehabilitation services, diabetes education and sexuality education.

The 'Geriatric Day Hospital' is a WRHA day hospital program—a service for outpatient and ambulatory care—in the City of Winnipeg that provides multidisciplinary care to individuals aged 65 and older. The four day hospitals in Winnipeg are operated by Deer Lodge Centre, Riverview Health Centre, St. Boniface Hospital, and Seven Oaks General Hospital. 'Health Services for the Elderly' operates in the downtown area in a similar capacity.

Location	Population (2013)	Hospitals	Health centres	MACH agencies	Personal care home
Assiniboine South	35,128				Charleswood Care Centre; Extendicare Tuxedo Villa; West Park Manor Personal Care Home
Churchill	1,006		Churchill Health Centre		
Downtown	81,092	Health Sciences Centre (tertiary): HSC Children's Hospital; HSC Women's Hospital	Misericordia Health Centre (long-term); Manitoba Adolescent Treatment Centre; Rehabilitation Centre for Children	Klinic Community Health; MFL Occupational Health Centre; Nine Circles Community Health Centre; Women's Health Clinic	Beacon Hill Lodge; Calvary Place Personal Care Home; Lions Personal Care Centre; Misericordia Place; Parkview Place
Fort Garry	83,451	Victoria General Hospital (community)			Golden Door Geriatric Centre; The Saul and Claribel Simkin Centre; Southeast Personal Care Home; St. Norbert Personal Care Home
Inkster	34,057			NorWest Co-op Community Health	Fred Douglas Lodge
Point Douglas	47,097			Aboriginal Health and Wellness Centre; Main Street Project; Mount Carmel Clinic	Holy Family Home
River East (Note: River East includes East St. Paul.)	56,747		Riverview Health Centre		The Convalescent Home of Winnipeg; Poseidon Care Centre; Pembina Place Mennonite Personal Care Home; Riverview Health Centre
Seven Oaks (Note: Seven Oaks includes West St. Paul)	73,487	Seven Oaks General Hospital (community)			Luther Home; Maples Care Centre; Middlechurch Home of Winnipeg (long-term); Actionmarguerite (St-Joseph)
St. Boniface	58,098	St. Boniface General Hospital (tertiary)		Centre de santé Saint-Boniface	Actionmarguerite (Saint‐Boniface)
St. James-Assiniboia	59,861	Grace Hospital (community)	Deer Lodge Centre		Deer Lodge Centre (long-term); Extendicare Oakview Place; Golden West Centennial Lodge; Heritage Lodge
St. Vital	69,169		St. Amant Centre (long-term) (Note: St. Amant is a not-for-profit organization for Manitobans with developmental disabilities and autism. Among other things, the Centre includes the St. Amant Research Centre, the St. Amant School, and River Road Child Care.)	Youville Health Centre	Actionmarguerite (Saint‐Vital); Extendicare Vista Park Lodge; Golden Links Lodge; Meadowood Manor; Park Manor Care; River Park Gardens
Transcona	38,198				

=== Churchill Health Centre ===
The Churchill Health Centre (CHC) serves the community of Churchill, Manitoba and surrounding communities, as well as Nunavut'a, Kitikmeot, and the Qikiqtaaluk regions of northern Canada. The CHC is an operating division of the WRHA, and has a staff of 129 people—including 6 regular doctors, 4 locums, 18 nurses, and 8 health-care professionals and support staff. It houses 21 acute care beds, a nursing ward, and 2 emergency rooms.

=== Pan Am Clinic ===
The Pan Am Clinic is an operating division of the Winnipeg Regional Health Authority, with a focus on sports medicine.

The Clinic was established in 1979 as a private health facility for athletes and sports-related injuries. It became a division of the WRHA in 2001. As of 2014, the facility includes bone and joint care and research, computer radiography, MRI, orthopaedic operations, plastic surgery services, a minor injury clinic for children, a research/education lab as well as a specialized concussion clinic at a satellite location, at the Bell MTS Iceplex.

=== Other centres ===
The Manitoba Adolescent Treatment Centre (MATC) provides mental health services for child and adolescent who experience psychiatric and/or emotional disorders. MATC opened as an independent psychiatric facility on 2 October 1984. It became part of the WRHA in 2000.

The Rehabilitation Centre for Children (RCC) provides rehabilitation services for children and youth with physical and developmental challenges in Manitoba and surrounding areas (including Nunavut and Northwestern Ontario). Along with the WRHA, the RCC receives funding from Manitoba Health, the Department of Families, various school divisions in Manitoba, and the Children's Rehabilitation Foundation.

== Churchill Regional Health Authority ==
In 2012, the provincial government merged the provinces eleven Regional Health Authorities into five. As part of this reorganization, the Churchill Regional Health Authority—which oversees health care for the town of Churchill, Manitoba and communities in the Kivalliq Region of Nunavut—was merged with the WRHA. The Churchill Region now operates as a division of the WRHA.
