= Misericordia Health Centre =

Hospital in Winnipeg, Manitoba, Canada

- Winnipeg Regional Health Authority
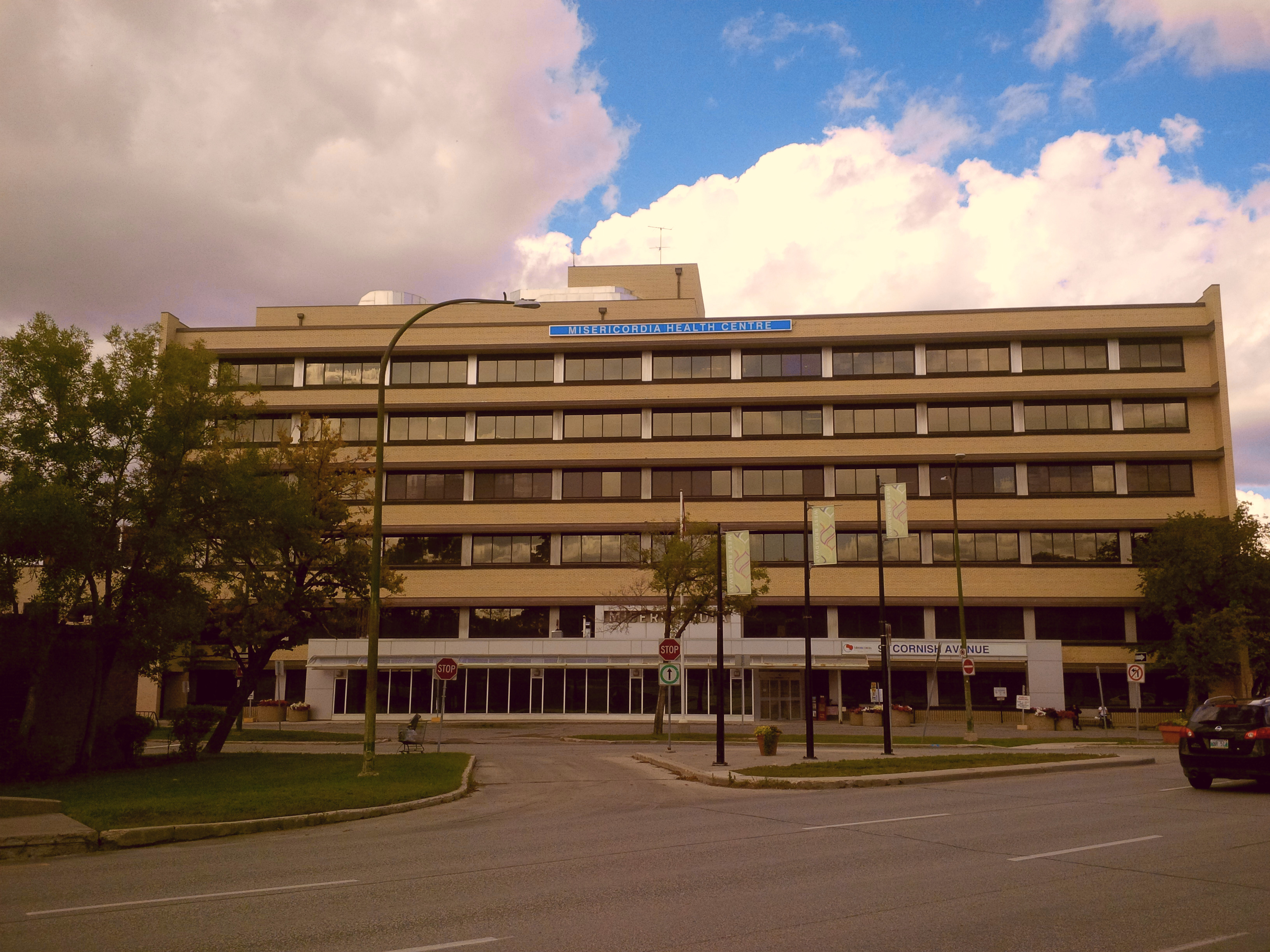

Geography
- Location: 99 Cornish Avenue; Winnipeg, Manitoba; R3C 1A2
- Coordinates: 49.8795°N 97.1603°W

Organisation
- Care system: Medicare
- Type: Teaching
- Affiliated university: University of Manitoba

Services
- Emergency department: No
- Speciality: Eye care centre of excellence

History
- Founded: 1898

Links
- Website: www.misericordia.mb.ca

Misericordia Health Centre was founded in Winnipeg, Manitoba, Canada by the Misericordia Sisters in 1898. Today, ownership of the hospital is the responsibility of the Misericordia Corporation within the Archdiocese of Winnipeg.

== History ==
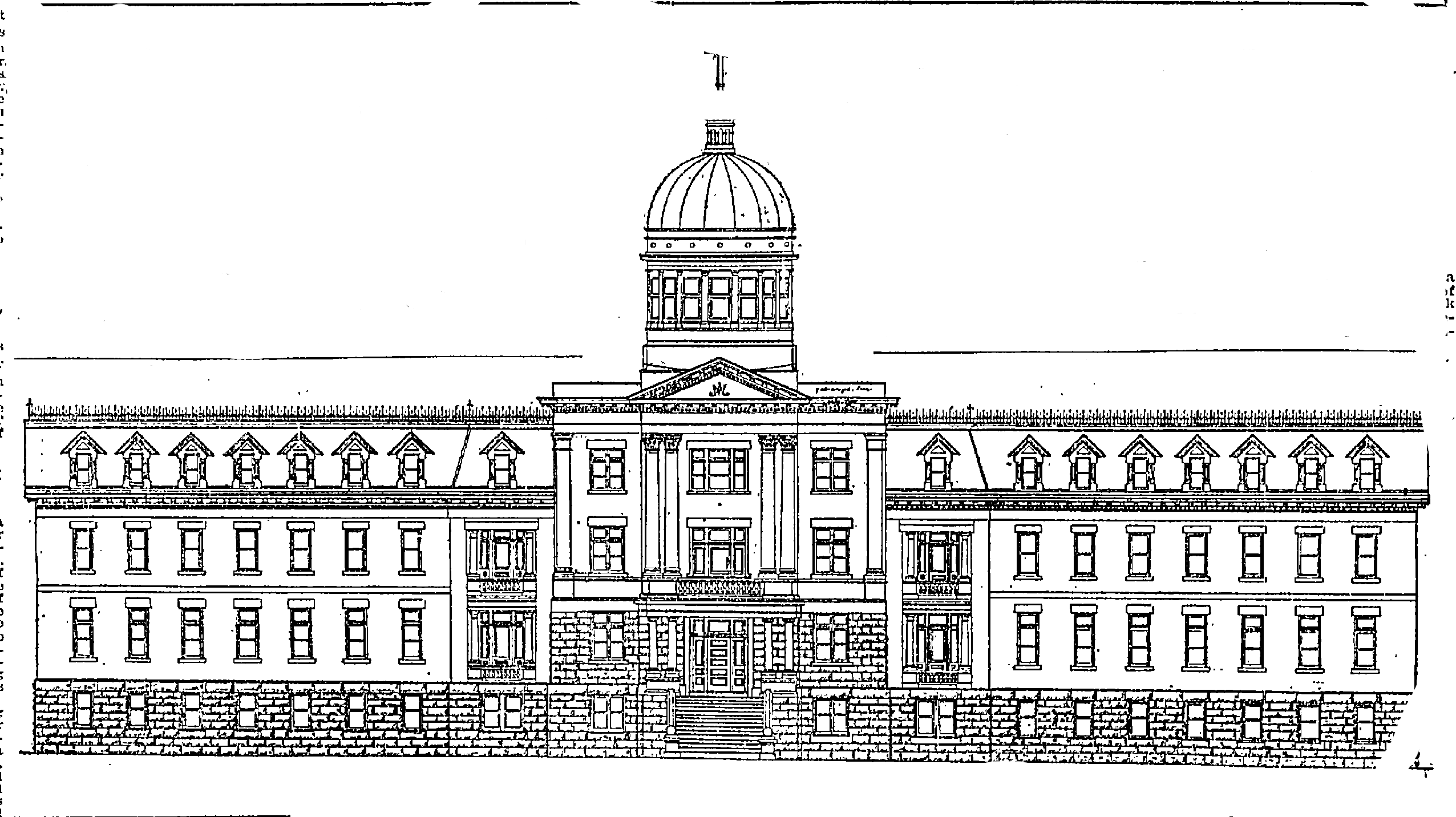
Exterior drawing of 1906 Misericordia Hospital extension

=== Winnipeg Maternity Hospital (1900-1917) ===
The Misericordia Sisters soon realized there was an increasing need from the community and in 1900 they moved to two and a half acres of land between Sherbrook and Maryland streets to establish the Winnipeg Maternity Hospital.

A few years later, in December 1906, a three-storey, $145,000 T-shaped addition, designed by architects Senecal & Smith was added. The basement level was reserved for separate dining areas for priests, nurses and patients. The first floor held a reception area and storage, as well as an office for the sister superior. The second floor had a living room with a balcony for the sisters. The addition opened in September 1907.

=== Misericordia General Hospital (1917-1998) ===
In 1917 the Winnipeg Maternity Hospital changed its name to Misericordia General Hospital with 125 beds, 50 bassinets and 50 medical practitioners. In the mid-1950s, 99 Cornish and Wolseley West additions were constructed.

=== Misericordia Health Centre (1998-Present) ===
In 1998, with the transition of the Emergency Department into an Urgent Care Centre and the opening of 174 Interim Care beds, Misericordia General Hospital changed its name to Misericordia Health Centre.

Since October 3, 2017 the Urgent Care Centre at MHC has moved to Victoria Community Hospital and Interim Care is home to 111 beds. Other changes that have occurred at MHC include:

- The construction of a 100-bed personal care home, Misericordia Place in 2000
- Significant expansion of the Provincial Health Contact Centres size and scope of programs
- Consolidation of the Sleep Disorder Centre at MHC in 2008
- Creation of a 16-bed Scheduled Respite Program

Four thousand eight hundred more CT scans per year will take place at MHC since a new ward, the Diagnostic Imaging Outpatient Centre, was opened in April 2019.

The 60 year old Misericordia Education and Resource Centre (691 Wolseley Ave.) is designated to be replaced by a 10-storey building of seniors housing.

== Funding programs ==
The funding for programs and services is administered through the Winnipeg Regional Health Authority and charitable donations received by the Misericordia Health Centre Foundation.
