= Grace Hospital (Winnipeg) =

- Winnipeg Regional Health Authority

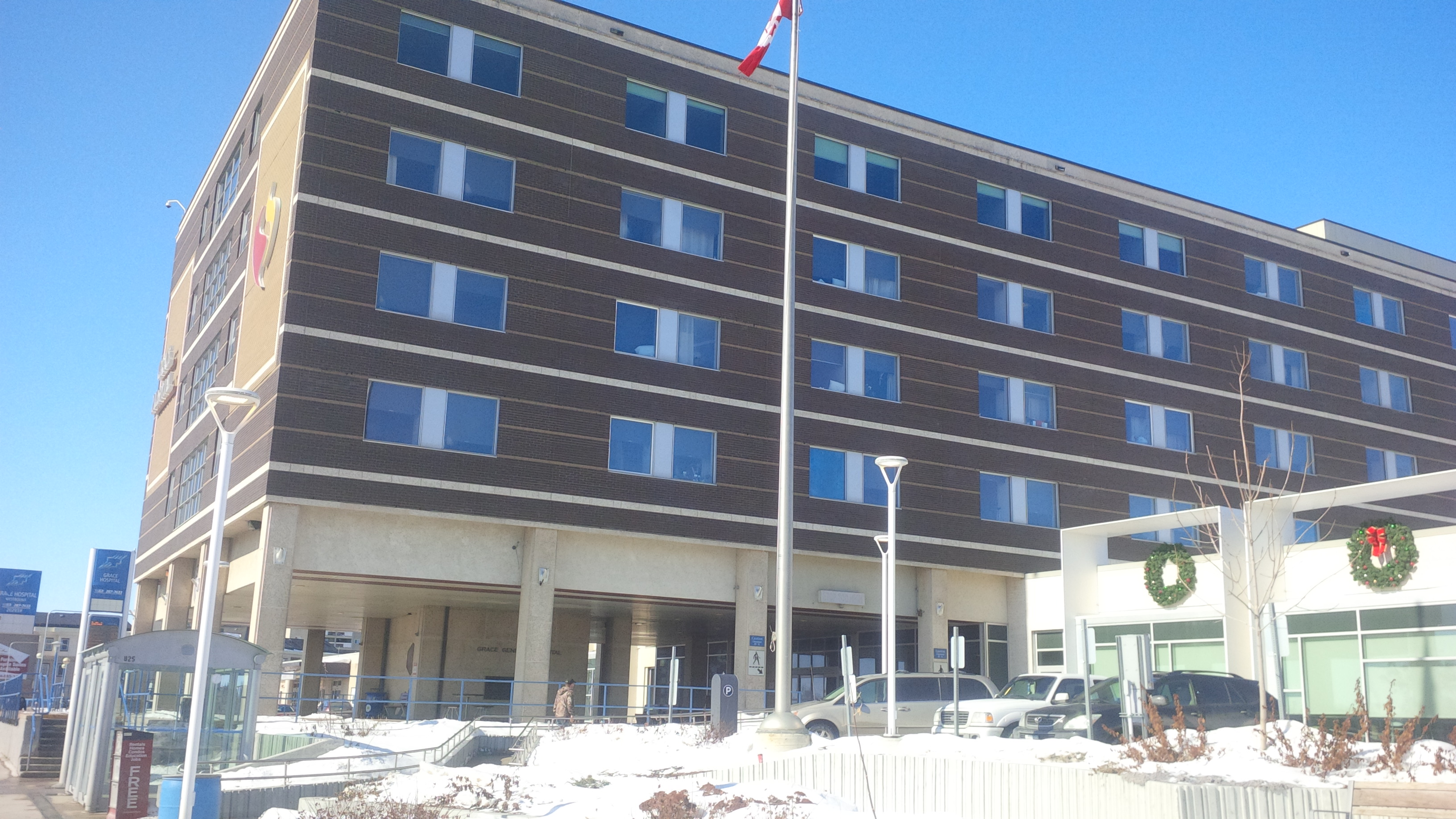

Geography
- Location: 300 Booth Drive; Winnipeg, Manitoba, Canada
- Coordinates: 49.8821°N 97.2768°W

Organization
- Care system: Public Medicare (Canada)
- Type: Teaching
- Affiliated university: University of Manitoba

Services
- Emergency department: Yes
- Beds: 227
- Speciality: Orthopedics, internal medicine, general surgery, psychiatry

History
- Founded: 1890

Links
- Website: www.gracehospital.ca
- Lists: Hospitals in Canada

Grace Hospital is a regional hospital in Winnipeg, Manitoba, Canada. The 250-bed hospital is located in the Crestview neighbourhood of St. James-Assiniboia.

The hospital was founded on Ross Avenue in 1890 by the Salvation Army, as a rescue home for women and children. It was incorporated in 1904 as The Salvation Army Grace General Hospital, and was the first Salvation Army hospital to be incorporated in Canada. The hospital was not truly a general hospital until 1927, when it was expanded from a maternity hospital.

The hospital was located on Ross Avenue until 1906 when a new building was erected at Preston Avenue and Arlington Street. The Arlington street location would be expanded and upgraded many times. The Arlington Street location was eventually replaced by a building in the St James area, for which construction began in 1964. The St James location officially opened in 1967. The old Arlington Street building was demolished in about 2015 and the Old Grace Housing Cooperative was built where it had been.

The hospital was run by the Salvation Army until 2008, when ownership was transferred to the Winnipeg Regional Health Authority.

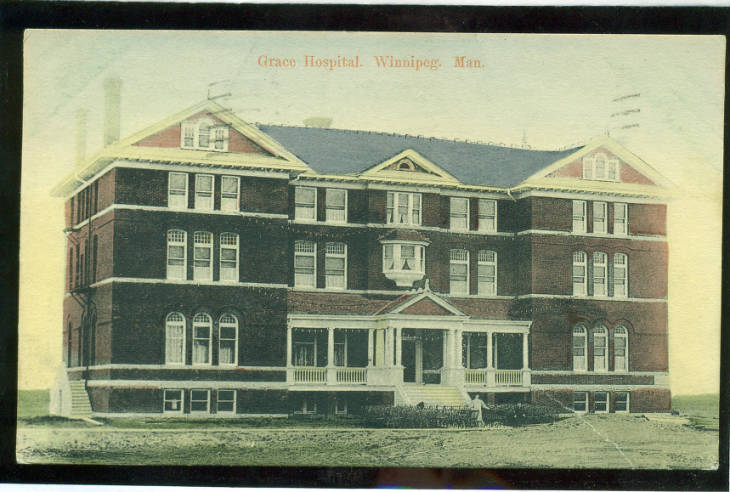
Grace Hospital. Winnipeg 1907

Deanna Durbin, a Hollywood actress of the 1930s and 1940s, was born at Grace Hospital on 4 December 1921 as Edna Mae Durbin. She moved from Winnipeg to California, USA in 1923.
