= Seven Oaks General Hospital =

- Winnipeg Regional Health Authority

Geography
- Location: 2300 McPhillips Street, Winnipeg, Manitoba, Canada
- Coordinates: 49°57′18″N 97°8′55″W

Organization
- Care system: Public Medicare (Canada)
- Type: non-teaching
- Affiliated university: None

Services
- Emergency department: No
- Beds: 208

History
- Founded: 1981

Links
- Website: http://www.sogh.ca/ Seven Oaks General Hospital
- Lists: Hospitals in Canada

Seven Oaks General Hospital (SOGH) is a community hospital in Winnipeg, Manitoba, Canada.

It was founded in 1981 by community leaders and approved by the province of Manitoba to serve the needs of the northern part of Winnipeg and surrounding area. Seven Oaks is also a hub for kidney health services, a centre for general surgery and orthopedic surgery, and has a large commitment to family medicine, both in terms of in-patient medical care, but also as a centre for the training of medical residents and the home of a new private medical clinic. The hospital also offers aboriginal health services, an access to care clinic, an intensive care unit, lab and diagnostic services, a library, an oncology clinic, as well as mental health and spiritual care. Following closures of the Emergency Room and ICU units, the SOGH lost 100 beds from 2019-2022 and now serves the community with 208 beds.

SOGH is adjoined by the Wellness Institute, a fitness center that includes programs for youth and adults for rehabilitation and health maintenance.

== History ==
In 1996, the Wellness Institute was built to promote health and wellness.

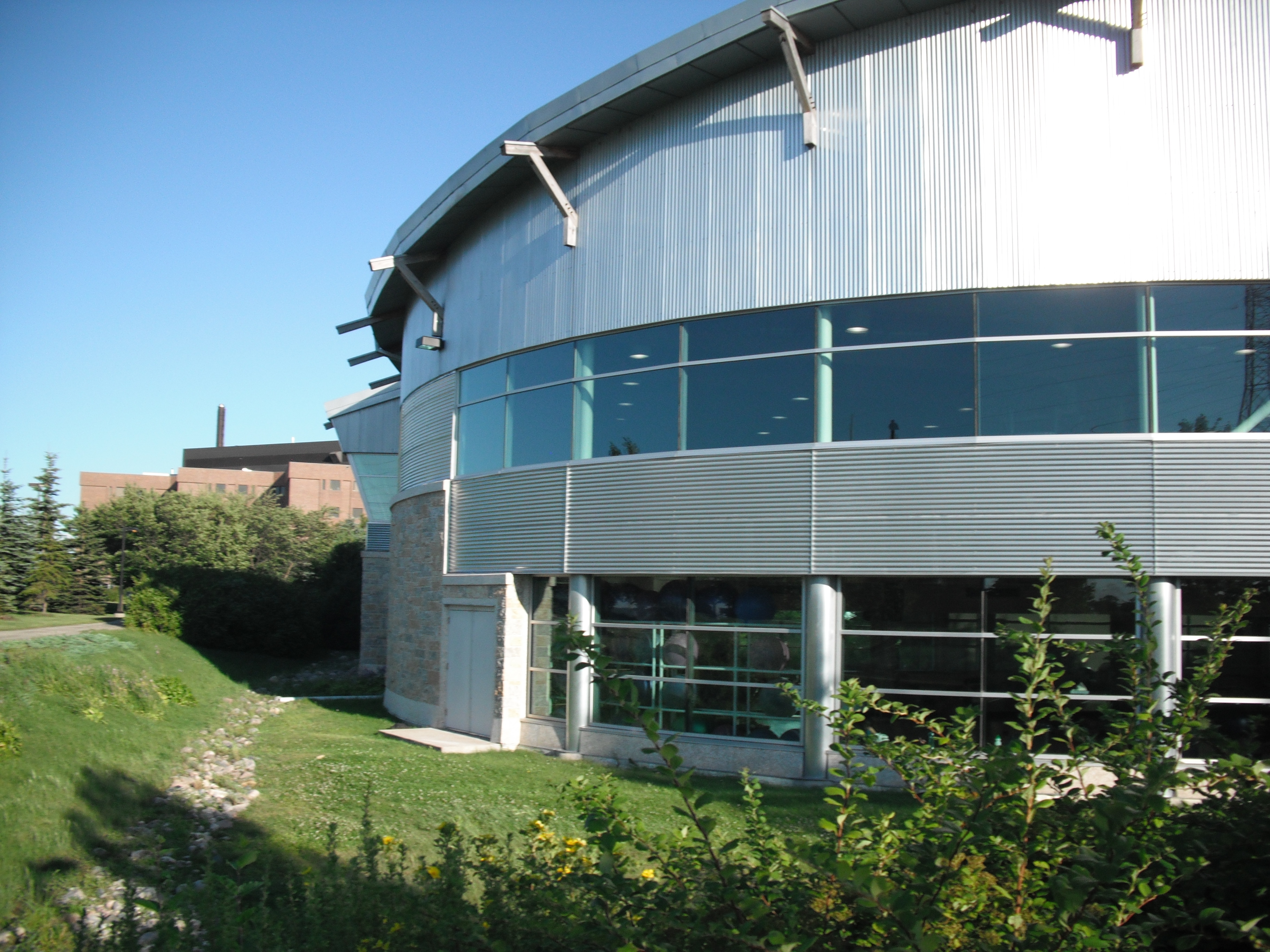
Wellness Institute at Seven Oaks Hospital

In 2017, the Seven Oaks General Hospital has opened a new space for medical researchers looking at the prevention, early identification, and treatment of chronic disease including diabetes, hypertension, and chronic kidney disease. The Chronic Disease Innovation Centre, home to a research team affiliated with the University of Manitoba's Rady Faculty of Medicine uses 'big data' to identify and prevent chronic disease, and improve health care effectiveness.

As of mid-September 2019, the Intensive Care Unit was planned to close down. This shutdown was part of the realignment of health services in the Winnipeg Metro area, under the Winnipeg Regional Health Authority.
