= Riverview Health Centre =

- Winnipeg Regional Health Authority

Geography
- Location: 1 Morley Avenue; Winnipeg, Manitoba, Canada; R3L 2P4
- Coordinates: 49°52′5.88″N 97°7′12″W

Organisation
- Care system: Medicare
- Type: non-teaching
- Affiliated university: None

Services
- Emergency department: No
- Beds: 388 beds

History
- Founded: 1911

Links
- Website: www.riverviewhealthcentre.com

Riverview Health Centre is a community hospital in Winnipeg, Manitoba, Canada. It was founded in 1911 by the City of Winnipeg as the Winnipeg Municipal Hospital. The hospital consisted of two buildings called the King Edward Memorial Hospital which was built in 1911 and the King George Hospital built in 1914. The Princess Elizabeth Hospital was added in 1950 as the first long-term care facility in Canada.

In 1983 the first purpose-built Geriatric Day Hospital was opened as an outpatient rehabilitation centre for seniors. It was named after the late MLA (1966–1969) and City of Winnipeg Mayor (1977–1979) Robert Ashley Steen.

In 1993 the facility separated from the City of Winnipeg and became incorporated as a community hospital, changing its name to Riverview Health Centre.

In 1995 the Municipal Hospital buildings were demolished, with the exception of a renovation of the Princess Elizabeth, and a new complex was constructed. The new facility opened in 1997, following a delay due to the Flood of the Century.

Currently, Riverview Health Centre operates multiple areas of specialized care, including:

- Personal Care and Special Needs Program
- Long Term Care / Complex Continuing Care
- Stroke & Acquired Brain Injury Rehabilitation
- Palliative Care
- Outpatient Geriatric Day Hospital
- The Rendezvous Club Adult Day Program
- Neuromuscular & Electrodiagnostic (EMG) Clinic

== See also ==
- Royal eponyms in Canada—locales in Canada named for royalty akin to Princess Elizabeth Hospital within Riverview Health Centre
