= Deer Lodge Centre =

Coordinates: 49°52′41″N 97°14′8″W

- Winnipeg Regional Health Authority

Geography
- Location: 2109 Portage Avenue, Winnipeg, Manitoba, Canada

Organization
- Care system: Public Medicare (Canada)
- Type: Non-teaching
- Affiliated university: University of Manitoba

Services
- Emergency department: No
- Beds: 487

History
- Founded: 1916

Links
- Website: http://www.deerlodge.mb.ca/ Deer Lodge Centre
- Lists: Hospitals in Canada

Deer Lodge Centre is a health centre specializing in geriatric care and treatment of Veterans in Winnipeg, Manitoba, Canada. The health centre began as a convalescent hospital for returning World War I soldiers in 1916 and was located in Silver Heights along west Portage Avenue. The health centre was run by Veterans Affairs Canada until 1983 when it was transferred to the province of Manitoba.

The health centre continues to serve the needs of Veterans but since its transfer to Manitoba has become the province's largest in-patient rehabilitation and long-term care facility with 429 beds. It also provides a variety of out-patient services.

The health centre is the location of the J. W. Crane Memorial Library, the biggest collection of material on aging in Canada.
