= Manitoba =

Province of Canada

- Province
- Flag Coat of arms
- Motto(s): Latin: Gloriosus et Liber "Glorious and free"
- Coordinates: 55°N 97°W
- Country: Canada
- Confederation: 15 July 1870 (5th, with Northwest Territories)
- Capital (and largest city): Winnipeg
- Largest metro: Winnipeg Metropolitan Region

Government
  - Type: Parliamentary constitutional monarchy
  - Lieutenant Governor: Anita Neville
  - Premier: Wab Kinew
- Legislature: Legislative Assembly of Manitoba
- Federal representation: Parliament of Canada
- House seats: 14 of 343 (4.1%)
- Senate seats: 6 of 105 (5.7%)

Area
  - Total: 647,797 km^{2} (250,116 sq mi)
  - Land: 553,556 km^{2} (213,729 sq mi)
  - Water: 94,241 km^{2} (36,387 sq mi) 14.5%
  - Rank: 8th
- 6.5% of Canada

Population (2021)
  - Total: 1,342,153
  - Estimate (Q3 2026): 1,517,379
  - Rank: 5th
- Demonym: Manitoban
- Official languages: English

GDP
  - Rank: 6th
  - Total (2024): C$96.125 billion
  - Per capita: C$64,421 (10th)
- Time zone: UTC−05:00 (Central Daylight Time, officially called Manitoba Standard Time)
- Website: gov.mb.ca
- Rankings include all provinces and territories

Manitoba (Note: /ˌmænɪˈtoʊbə/ MAN-ih-TOH-bə) is a province of Canada at the longitudinal centre of the country. It is Canada's fifth-most populous province, with an estimated population of 1,517,379 as of 2026. Manitoba is bordered by Nunavut and the Northwest Territories to the north, Hudson Bay to the northeast, Ontario to the east, the US states of North Dakota and Minnesota to the south, and Saskatchewan to the west. The province has a widely varied landscape, from arctic tundra and the Hudson Bay coastline in the north to dense boreal forest, large freshwater lakes, and prairie grassland in the central and southern regions. Its capital and largest city is Winnipeg.

Indigenous peoples have inhabited what is now Manitoba for approximately 10,000 years. In the early 17th century, English and French fur traders began arriving in the area and establishing settlements. England secured control of the region in 1670, creating a territory named Rupert's Land under the administration of the Hudson's Bay Company. Rupert's Land, which included all of present-day Manitoba, grew and evolved from 1670 until 1869 with significant settlements of Indigenous and Métis people in the Red River Colony. Deep disagreements over self-determination during negotiations to transfer Rupert's Land to Canada in 1869 led to an armed resistance known as the Red River Rebellion, led by Louis Riel against the Canadian government. Subsequent negotiations resulted in Manitoba becoming the fifth province to join Canadian Confederation, when the Parliament of Canada passed the Manitoba Act on 15 July 1870.

Manitoba has a diversified market economy led by manufacturing, natural resources, and agribusiness. The province maintains an established Francophone presence, with French holding official legislative and judicial status in Manitoba alongside the majority English language. Winnipeg is the dominant economic, political, and cultural centre, with the Winnipeg Metropolitan Region encompassing nearly two-thirds of the provincial population. As the province's primary hub, the city hosts the Legislative Assembly of Manitoba and Manitoba Court of Appeal, four of the province's five universities, all of its professional sports teams, Winnipeg Richardson International Airport, and CFB Winnipeg/Canadian NORAD headquarters. Outside of the capital region, secondary economic centres in Manitoba include Brandon, Steinbach, and Thompson.

== Etymology ==
The name Manitoba possibly derives from either Cree manitou-wapow or Ojibwe manidoobaa, both meaning 'straits of Manitou, the Great Spirit'. Alternatively, it may be from the Assiniboine minnetoba, meaning 'Lake of the Prairie' (the lake was known to French explorers as Lac des Prairies). The name was chosen by Thomas Spence for the new republic he proposed for the area south of the lake. Métis leader Louis Riel preferred the name over the proposed alternative of "Assiniboia". It was accepted in Ottawa under the Manitoba Act, 1870.

== History ==
=== Indigenous societies and European settlement ===
Modern-day Manitoba was inhabited by the First Nations people shortly after the last ice age glaciers retreated in the southwest about 10,000 years ago; the first exposed land was the Turtle Mountain area. The Ojibwe, Cree, Dene, Sioux, Mandan, and Assiniboine peoples founded settlements, and other tribes entered the area to trade. In Northern Manitoba, quartz was mined to make arrowheads. The first farming in Manitoba was along the Red River, where corn and other seed crops were planted before contact with Europeans.

In 1611, Henry Hudson was one of the first Europeans to sail into what is now known as Hudson Bay, where he and some loyal crewmembers were marooned by mutineers. Thomas Button travelled this area in 1612 in an unsuccessful attempt to find and rescue Hudson. When the British ship Nonsuch sailed into Hudson Bay in 1668–1669, she became the first trading vessel to reach the area; that voyage led to the formation of the Hudson's Bay Company, to which the British government gave absolute control of the entire Hudson Bay watershed. This watershed was named Rupert's Land, after Prince Rupert, who helped to subsidize the Hudson's Bay Company. York Factory was founded in 1684 after the original fort of the Hudson's Bay Company, Fort Nelson (built in 1682), was destroyed by rival French traders.

Pierre Gaultier de Varennes, sieur de La Vérendrye, visited the Red River Valley in the 1730s to help open the area for French exploration and trade. As French explorers entered the area, a Montreal-based company, the North West Company, began trading with the local Indigenous people. Both the North West Company and the Hudson's Bay Company built fur-trading forts; the two companies competed in southern Manitoba, occasionally resulting in violence, until they merged in 1821 (the Hudson's Bay Company Archives in Winnipeg preserve the history of this era).

Great Britain secured the territory in 1763 after their victory over France in the North American theatre of the Seven Years' War, better known as the French and Indian War in North America, lasting from 1754 to 1763. The founding of the first agricultural community and settlements, the Selkirk Concession, by Lord Selkirk in 1812 led to conflict between British colonists and the Métis. Twenty colonists, including the governor, and one Métis were killed in the Battle of Seven Oaks in 1816.

=== Confederation ===
Territorial evolution of Canada, 1867–present

Rupert's Land was ceded to Canada by the Hudson's Bay Company in 1869 and incorporated into the Northwest Territories; a lack of attention to Métis concerns caused Métis leader Louis Riel to establish a local provisional government which formed into the Convention of Forty and the subsequent elected Legislative Assembly of Assiniboia on 9 March 1870. This assembly subsequently sent three delegates to Ottawa to negotiate with the Canadian government. This resulted in the Manitoba Act and that province's entry into Confederation. Prime Minister Sir John A. Macdonald introduced the Manitoba Act in the House of Commons of Canada, the bill was given Royal Assent and Manitoba was brought into Canada as a province in 1870. Louis Riel was pursued by British army officer Garnet Wolseley because of the rebellion, and Riel fled into exile. The Canadian government blocked the Métis' attempts to obtain land promised to them as part of Manitoba's entry into confederation. Facing racism from the new flood of white settlers from Ontario, large numbers of Métis moved to what would become Saskatchewan and Alberta.

Numbered Treaties were signed in the late 19th century with the chiefs of First Nations that lived in the area. They made specific promises of land for every family. As a result, a reserve system was established under the jurisdiction of the federal government. The prescribed amount of land promised to the native peoples was not always given; this led Indigenous groups to assert rights to the land through land claims, many of which are still ongoing.

The original province of Manitoba was a square one-eighteenth of its current size, and was known colloquially as the "postage stamp province". Its borders were expanded in 1881, taking land from the Northwest Territories and the District of Keewatin, but Ontario claimed a large portion of the land; the disputed portion was awarded to Ontario in 1889. Manitoba grew to its current size in 1912, absorbing land from the Northwest Territories to reach 60°N, uniform with the northern reach of its western neighbours Saskatchewan, Alberta and British Columbia.

The Manitoba Schools Question showed the deep divergence of cultural values in the territory. The Catholic Franco-Manitobans had been guaranteed a state-supported separate school system in the original constitution of Manitoba, but a grassroots political movement among English Protestants from 1888 to 1890 demanded the end of French schools. In 1890, the Manitoba legislature passed a law removing funding for French Catholic schools. The French Catholic minority asked the federal government for support; however, the Orange Order and other anti-Catholic forces mobilized nationwide to oppose them. The federal Conservatives proposed remedial legislation to override Manitoba, but they were blocked by the Liberals, led by Wilfrid Laurier. Once elected Prime Minister in 1896, Laurier implemented a compromise stating Catholics in Manitoba could have their own religious instruction for 30 minutes at the end of the day if there were enough students to warrant it, implemented on a school-by-school basis.

=== Contemporary era ===
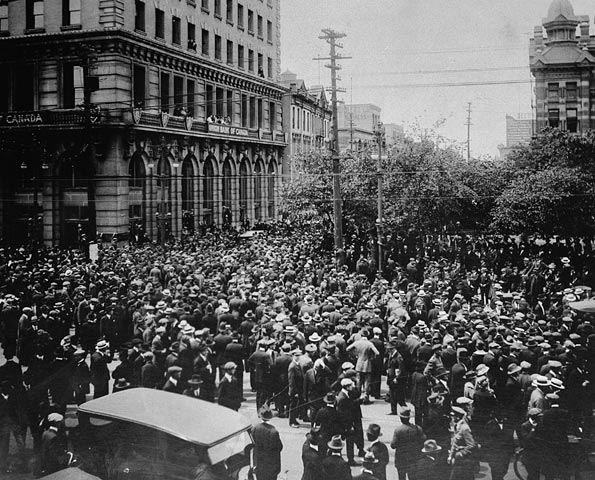
Crowds gathering outside the old City Hall during the Winnipeg general strike, 21 June 1919

By 1911, Winnipeg was the third largest city in Canada, and remained so until overtaken by Vancouver in the 1920s. A boomtown, it grew quickly around the start of the 20th century, with outside investors and immigrants contributing to its success. The drop in growth in the second half of the decade was a result of the opening of the Panama Canal in 1914, which reduced reliance on transcontinental railways for trade, as well as a decrease in immigration due to the outbreak of the First World War. Over 18,000 Manitoba residents enlisted in the first year of the war; by the end of the war, 14 Manitobans had received the Victoria Cross.

During the First World War, Nellie McClung started the campaign for women's votes. On 28 January 1916, the vote for women was legalized. Manitoba was the first province to allow women to vote in provincial elections. This was two years before Canada as a country granted women the right to vote.

After the First World War ended, severe discontent among farmers (over wheat prices) and union members (over wage rates) resulted in an upsurge of radicalism, coupled with a polarization over the rise of Bolshevism in Russia. The most dramatic result was the Winnipeg general strike of 1919. It began on 15 May and collapsed on 25 June 1919; as the workers gradually returned to their jobs, the Central Strike Committee decided to end the movement. Government efforts to violently crush the strike, including a Royal North-West Mounted Police charge into a crowd of protesters that resulted in multiple casualties and one death, had led to the arrest of the movement's leaders. In the aftermath, eight leaders went on trial, and most were convicted on charges of seditious conspiracy, illegal combinations, and seditious libel; four were deported under the Canadian Immigration Act.

The Great Depression (1929 – c. 1939) hit especially hard in Western Canada, including Manitoba. The collapse of the world market combined with a steep drop in agricultural production due to drought led to economic diversification, moving away from a reliance on wheat production. The Manitoba Co-operative Commonwealth Federation, forerunner to the New Democratic Party of Manitoba (NDP), was founded in 1932.

Canada entered the Second World War in 1939. Winnipeg was one of the major commands for the British Commonwealth Air Training Plan to train fighter pilots, and there were air training schools throughout Manitoba. Several Manitoba-based regiments were deployed overseas, including Princess Patricia's Canadian Light Infantry. In an effort to raise money for the war effort, the Victory Loan campaign organized "If Day" in 1942. The event featured a simulated Nazi invasion and occupation of Manitoba, and eventually raised over C$65 million.

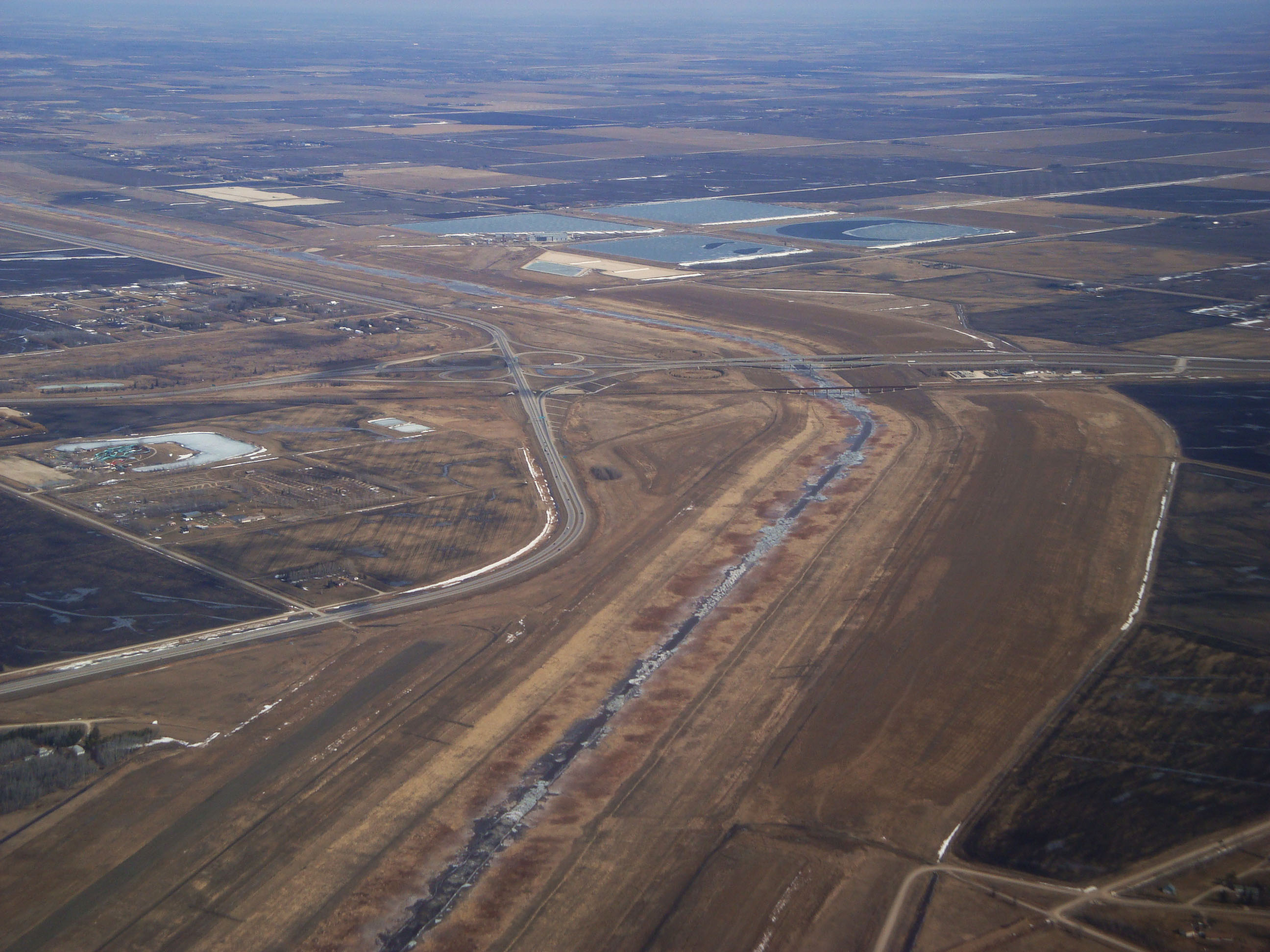
Aerial view of the Red River Floodway

Winnipeg was inundated during the 1950 Red River Flood and had to be partially evacuated. In that year, the Red River reached its highest level since 1861 and flooded most of the Red River Valley. The damage caused by the flood led then-Premier Duff Roblin to advocate for the construction of the Red River Floodway; it was completed in 1968 after six years of excavation. Permanent dikes were erected in eight towns south of Winnipeg, and clay dikes and diversion dams were built in the Winnipeg area. In 1997, the "Flood of the Century" caused over C$400 million in damages in Manitoba, but the floodway prevented Winnipeg from flooding.

In 1990, Prime Minister Brian Mulroney attempted to pass the Meech Lake Accord, a series of constitutional amendments to persuade Quebec to endorse the Canada Act 1982. Unanimous support in the legislature was needed to bypass public consultation. Cree politician Elijah Harper opposed because he did not believe First Nations had been adequately involved in the Accord's process, and thus the Accord failed.

Glen Murray, elected in Winnipeg in 1998, became the first openly gay mayor of a large North American city. The province was impacted by major flooding in 2009 and 2011. In 2004, Manitoba became the first province in Canada to ban indoor smoking in public places. In 2013, Manitoba was the second province to introduce accessibility legislation, protecting the rights of persons with disabilities.

== Geography ==
Relief map of Manitoba

Manitoba is bordered by the provinces of Ontario to the east and Saskatchewan to the west, the territory of Nunavut to the north, Northwest Territories at a quadripoint to the northwest, and the US states of North Dakota and Minnesota to the south. Manitoba is at the centre of the Hudson Bay drainage basin, with a high volume of the water draining into Lake Winnipeg and then north down the Nelson River into Hudson Bay. This basin's rivers reach far west to the mountains, far south into the United States, and east into Ontario. Major watercourses include the Red, Assiniboine, Nelson, Winnipeg, Hayes, Whiteshell and Churchill rivers. Most of Manitoba's inhabited south has developed in the prehistoric bed of Glacial Lake Agassiz. This region, particularly the Red River Valley, is flat and fertile; receding glaciers left hilly and rocky areas throughout the province.

The province has a saltwater coastline bordering Hudson Bay and more than 110,000 lakes, covering approximately 15.6 percent or 101,593 square kilometres (39,225 sq mi) of its surface area. Manitoba's major lakes are Lake Manitoba, Lake Winnipegosis, and Lake Winnipeg, the tenth-largest freshwater lake in the world. A total of 29,000 square kilometres (11,000 sq mi) of traditional First Nations lands and boreal forest on Lake Winnipeg's east side were officially designated as a UNESCO World Heritage Site known as Pimachiowin Aki in 2018.

Baldy Mountain is the province's highest point at 832 metres (2,730 ft) above sea level, and the Hudson Bay coast is the lowest at sea level. Riding Mountain, the Pembina Hills, Sandilands Provincial Forest, and the Canadian Shield are also upland regions. Much of the province's sparsely inhabited north and east lie on the irregular granite Canadian Shield, including Whiteshell, Atikaki, and Nopiming Provincial Parks.

Extensive agriculture is found only in the province's southern areas, although there is grain farming in the Carrot Valley Region (near The Pas). Around 11 per cent of Canada's farmland is in Manitoba.

=== Climate ===
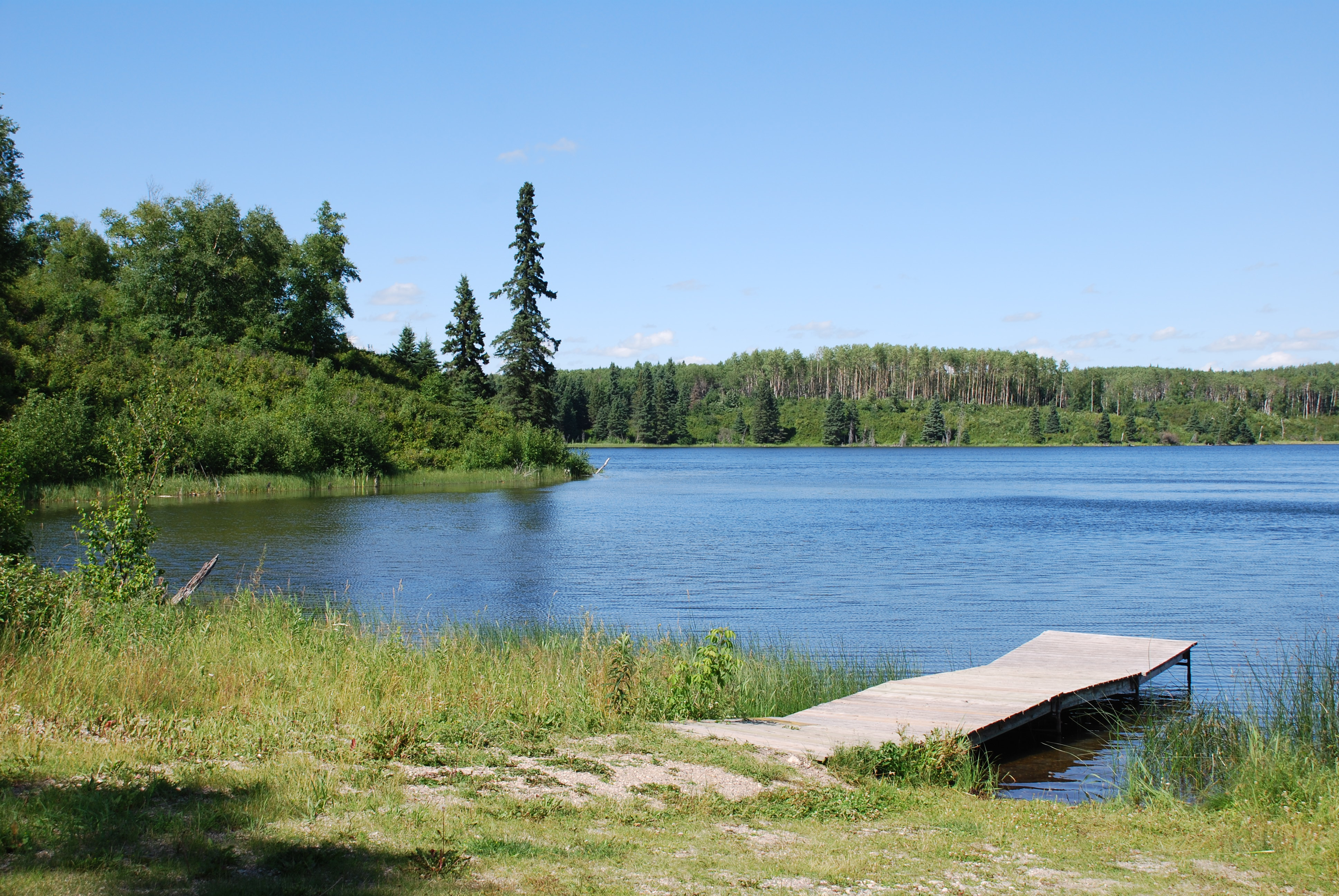
Deep Lake at Riding Mountain National Park

Manitoba has an extreme continental climate. Temperatures and precipitation generally decrease from south to north and increase from east to west. Manitoba is far from the moderating influences of mountain ranges or large bodies of water. Because of the generally flat landscape, it is exposed to cold Arctic high-pressure air masses from the northwest during January and February. In the summer, air masses sometimes come out of the Southern United States, as warm humid air is drawn northward from the Gulf of Mexico. Temperatures exceed 30 °C (86 °F) numerous times each summer, and the combination of heat and humidity can bring the humidex value to the mid-40s. Carman, Manitoba, recorded the second-highest humidex ever in Canada in 2007, with 53.0. According to Environment Canada, Manitoba ranked first for clearest skies year round and ranked second for clearest skies in the summer and for the sunniest province in the winter and spring.

Southern Manitoba (including the city of Winnipeg), falls into the humid continental climate zone (Köppen Dfb). This area is cold and windy in the winter and often has blizzards because of the open landscape. Summers are warm with a moderate length. This region is the most humid area in the prairie provinces, with moderate precipitation. Southwestern Manitoba, though under the same climate classification as the rest of Southern Manitoba, is closer to the semi-arid interior of Palliser's Triangle. The area is drier and more prone to droughts than other parts of southern Manitoba. This area is cold and windy in the winter and has frequent blizzards due to the openness of the Canadian Prairie landscape. Summers are generally warm to hot, with low to moderate humidity.

Southern parts of the province, just north of Tornado Alley, experience tornadoes, with 16 confirmed touchdowns in 2016. In 2007, on 22 and 23 June, numerous tornadoes touched down, the largest an F5 tornado that devastated parts of Elie (the strongest recorded tornado in Canada).

Köppen climate types of Manitoba

The province's northern sections (including the city of Thompson) fall in the subarctic climate zone (Köppen climate classification Dfc). This region features long and extremely cold winters and brief, warm summers with little precipitation. Overnight temperatures as low as −40 °C (−40 °F) occur on several days each winter.

Community	Region	July daily maximum	January daily maximum	Annual precipitation
Morden	Pembina Valley	26 °C (79 °F)	−10 °C (14 °F)	541 mm (21 in)
Winnipeg	Winnipeg	26 °C (79 °F)	−11 °C (12 °F)	521 mm (21 in)
Pierson	Westman Region	27 °C (81 °F)	−9 °C (16 °F)	457 mm (18 in)
Dauphin	Parkland	25 °C (77 °F)	−10 °C (14 °F)	482 mm (19 in)
Steinbach	Eastman	25 °C (77 °F)	−11 °C (12 °F)	581 mm (23 in)
Portage la Prairie	Central Plains	26 °C (79 °F)	−9 °C (16 °F)	532 mm (21 in)
Brandon	Westman	25 °C (77 °F)	−11 °C (12 °F)	474 mm (19 in)
The Pas	Northern	24 °C (75 °F)	−14 °C (7 °F)	450 mm (18 in)
Thompson	Northern	23 °C (73 °F)	−18 °C (0 °F)	474 mm (19 in)
Churchill	Northern	18 °C (64 °F)	−22 °C (−8 °F)	453 mm (18 in)

=== Flora and fauna ===
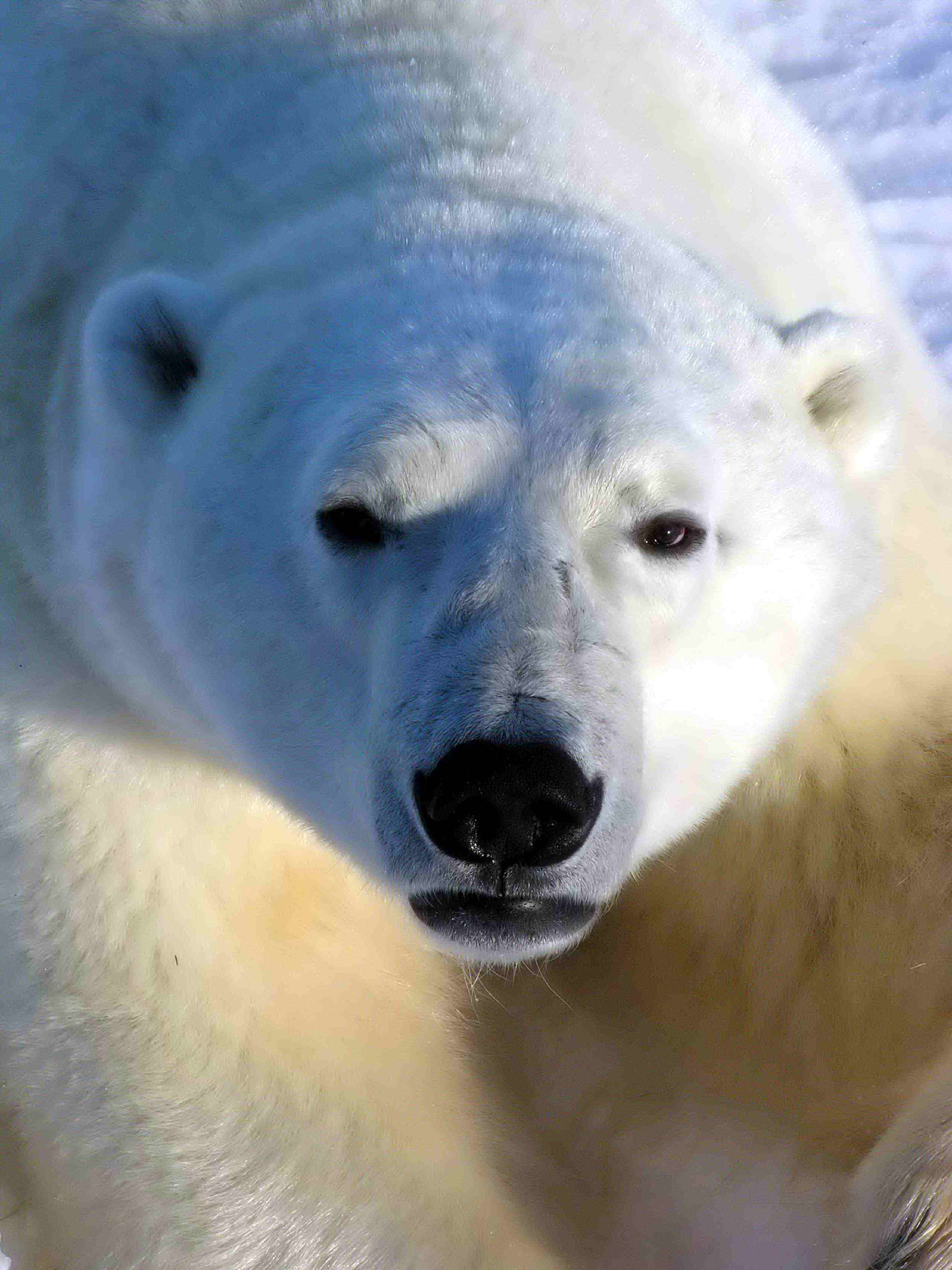
Polar bears are common in northern Manitoba.

Manitoba natural communities may be grouped within five ecozones: boreal plains, prairie, taiga shield, boreal shield and Hudson plains. Three of these—taiga shield, boreal shield and Hudson plain—contain part of the boreal forest of Canada, which covers the province's eastern, southeastern, and northern reaches.

Forests make up about 263,000 square kilometres (102,000 sq mi), or 48 percent, of the province's land area. The forests consist of pines (jack, red, eastern white), spruces (white, black), balsam fir, tamarack, poplars (balsam, trembling aspen), birches (white, swamp), and small pockets of eastern white cedar.

Two sections of the province are not dominated by forest. The province's northeast corner bordering Hudson Bay is above the treeline and considered tundra. The tallgrass prairie once dominated the south-central and southeastern regions, including the Red River Valley. Mixed grass prairie is found in the southwestern region. Agriculture has replaced much of the natural vegetation, but prairie can still be found in parks and protected areas; some are notable for the presence of the endangered western prairie fringed orchid.

Manitoba is especially noted for its northern polar bear population; Churchill is commonly referred to as the "Polar Bear Capital". In the waters off the northern coast of the province are numerous marine species, including the beluga whale. Other populations of animals, including moose, white-tailed deer, mule deer, black and brown bears, coyote, cougar, red fox, Canada lynx, and grey wolf, are distributed throughout the province, especially in the provincial and national parks.

There is a large population of red-sided garter snakes near Narcisse; the overwintering dens there are seasonally home to the world's largest concentration of snakes.

Manitoba's bird diversity is enhanced by its position on two major migration routes, with 391 confirmed identified species; 287 of these nest within the province. These include the great grey owl, the province's official bird, and the endangered peregrine falcon.

Manitoba's lakes host 18 species of game fish, particularly species of trout, pike, and goldeye, as well as many smaller fish.

== Demography ==
Largest cities by population
City	2021	2016
Winnipeg	749,607	705,224
Brandon	51,313	48,883
Steinbach	17,806	16,022
Winkler	13,745	12,660
Portage la Prairie	13,270	13,304
Thompson	13,035	13,678
Selkirk	10,504	10,278
Morden	9,929	8,668
Dauphin	8,638	8,369
Table source: Statistics Canada

At the 2021 census, Manitoba had a population of 1,342,153, more than half of which is in Winnipeg. Although initial colonization of the province revolved mostly around homesteading, the last century has seen a shift towards urbanization; Manitoba is the only Canadian province with over fifty-five percent of its population in a single city.

The largest ethnic group in Manitoba is English (16.1%), followed by Scottish (14.5%), German (13.6%), Ukrainian (12.6%), Irish (11.0%), French (9.3%), Canadian (8.4%), Filipino (7.0%), Métis (6.8%), Polish (6.0%), First Nations (4.5%), Mennonite (3.9%), Russian (3.7%), Dutch (3.3%), Indian (3.0%), and Icelandic (2.4%). Indigenous peoples (including Métis) are Manitoba's fastest-growing ethnic group, representing 13.6 percent of Manitoba's population as of 2001 (some reserves refused to allow census-takers to enumerate their populations or were otherwise incompletely counted). Gimli, Manitoba is home to the largest Icelandic community outside of Iceland.

As of the 2021 Canadian Census, the ten most spoken languages in the province included English (1,288,950 or 98.6%), French (111,790 or 8.55%), Tagalog (73,440 or 5.62%), Punjabi (42,820 or 3.28%), German (41,980 or 3.21%), (Note: Speakers of Plautdietsch were counted under German speakers prior to 2021 census) Hindi (26,980 or 2.06%), Spanish (23,435 or 1.79%), Mandarin (16,765 or 1.28%), Cree (16,115 or 1.23%), (Note: Includes Cree-Montagnais languages not otherwise specified) and Plautdietsch (15,055 or 1.15%). The question on knowledge of languages allows for multiple responses.

Most Manitobans belong to a Christian denomination: on the 2021 census, 54.2% reported being Christian, followed by 2.7% Sikh, 2.0% Muslim, 1.4% Hindu, 0.9% Jewish, and 0.8% Indigenous spirituality. 36.7% reported no religious affiliation. The largest Christian denominations by number of adherents were the Roman Catholic Church with 21.2%; the United Church of Canada with 5.8%; and the Anglican Church of Canada with 3.3%.

== Economy ==
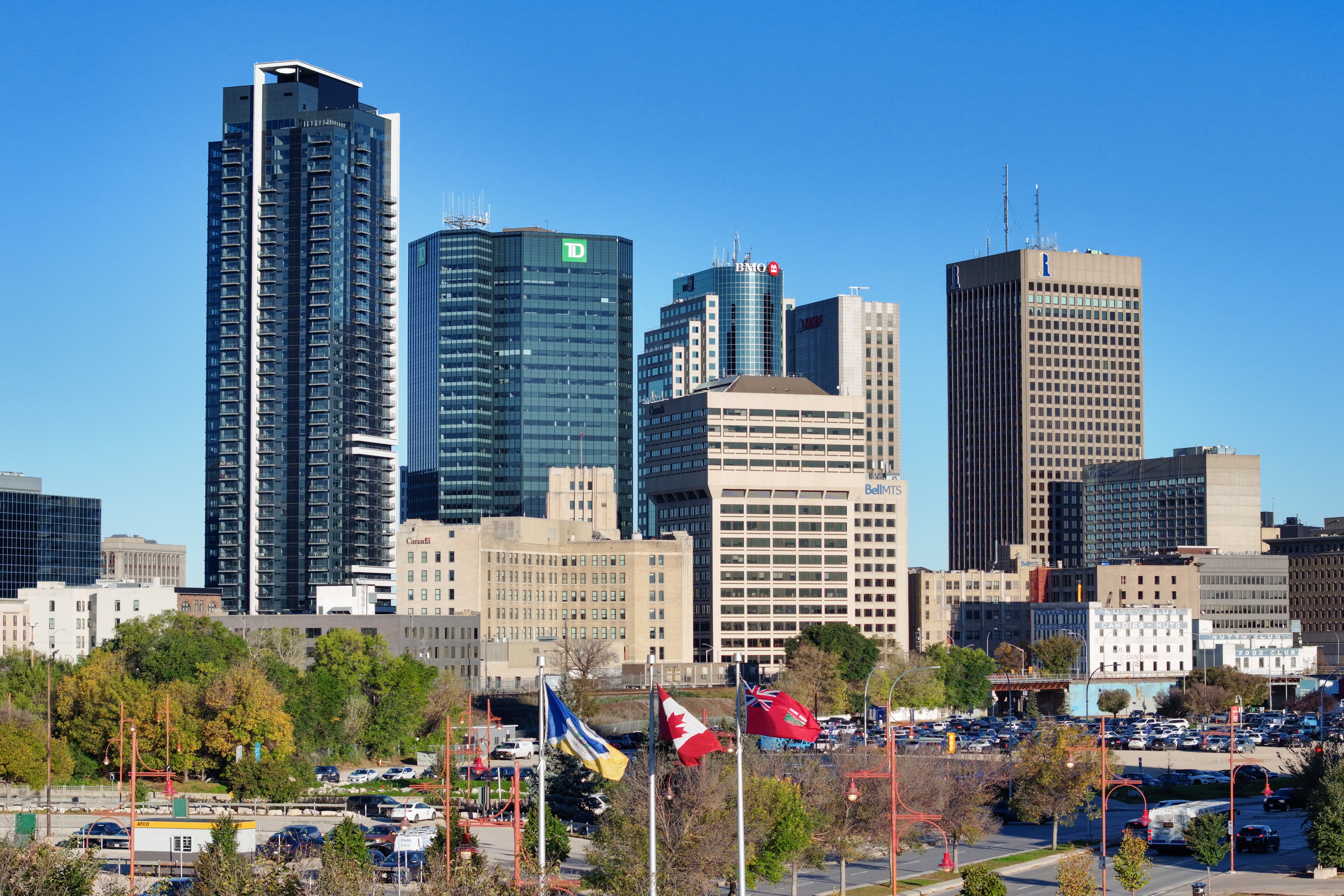
Winnipeg is Manitoba's largest city and capital.

Manitoba has a moderately strong economy based largely on natural resources. Its Gross Domestic Product was C$50.834 billion in 2008. The province's economy grew 2.4 percent in 2008, the third consecutive year of growth. The average individual income in Manitoba in 2006 was C$25,100 (compared to a national average of C$26,500), ranking fifth-highest among the provinces. As of October 2009, Manitoba's unemployment rate was 5.8 percent.

Manitoba's economy relies heavily on agriculture, tourism, electricity, oil, mining, and forestry. Agriculture is vital and is found mostly in the southern half of the province, although grain farming occurs as far north as The Pas. The most common agricultural activity is cattle husbandry, followed by assorted grains and oilseed. Manitoba is the nation's largest producer of sunflower seed and dry beans, and one of the leading sources of potatoes. Portage la Prairie is a major potato processing centre. Richardson International, one of the largest oat mills in the world, also has a plant in the municipality.

Manitoba's largest employers are government and government-funded institutions, including crown corporations and services like hospitals and universities. Major private-sector employers are The Great-West Life Assurance Company, Cargill Ltd., and Richardson International. Manitoba also has large manufacturing and tourism sectors. Churchill's Arctic wildlife is a major tourist attraction; the town is a world capital for polar bear and beluga whale watchers. Manitoba is the only province with an Arctic deep-water seaport, at Churchill.

In January 2018, the Canadian Federation of Independent Business claimed Manitoba was the most improved province for tackling red tape.

=== Economic history ===
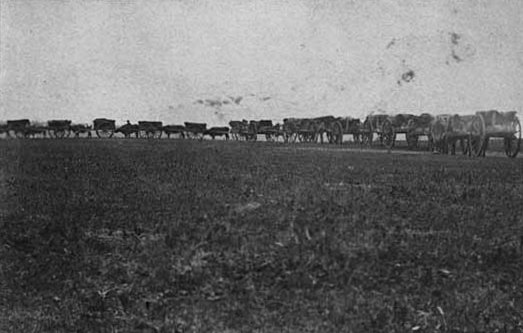
Red River cart train

Manitoba's early economy depended on mobility and living off the land. Indigenous Nations (Cree, Ojibwa, Dene, Sioux and Assiniboine) followed herds of bison and congregated to trade among themselves at key meeting places throughout the province. After the arrival of the first European traders in the 17th century, the economy centred on the trade of beaver pelts and other furs. Diversification of the economy came when Lord Selkirk brought the first agricultural settlers in 1811, though the triumph of the Hudson's Bay Company (HBC) over its competitors ensured the primacy of the fur trade over widespread agricultural colonization.

HBC control of Rupert's Land ended in 1868; when Manitoba became a province in 1870, all land became the property of the federal government, with homesteads granted to settlers for farming. Transcontinental railways were constructed to simplify trade. Manitoba's economy depended mainly on farming, which persisted until drought and the Great Depression led to further diversification.

== Military bases ==
CFB Winnipeg is a Canadian Forces Base at the Winnipeg International Airport. The base is home to flight operations support divisions and several training schools, as well as the 1 Canadian Air Division and Canadian NORAD Region Headquarters. 17 Wing of the Canadian Forces is based at CFB Winnipeg; the Wing has three squadrons and six schools. It supports 113 units from Thunder Bay to the Saskatchewan/Alberta border, and from the 49th parallel north to the high Arctic. 17 Wing acts as a deployed operating base for CF-18 Hornet fighter–bombers assigned to the Canadian NORAD Region.

The two 17 Wing squadrons based in the city are: the 402 ("City of Winnipeg" Squadron), which flies the Canadian-designed and produced de Havilland Canada CT-142 Dash 8 navigation trainer (a military variant of the Bombardier Dash 8 turboprop aircraft) in support of the 1 Canadian Forces Flight Training School's Air Combat Systems Officer and Airborne Electronic Sensor Operator training programs (which trains all Canadian Air Combat Systems Officers); and the 435 ("Chinthe" Transport and Rescue Squadron), which flies the Lockheed C-130 Hercules tanker/transport in airlift search and rescue roles, and is the only Air Force C-130 squadron equipped and trained to conduct air-to-air refuelling of fighter aircraft.

Canadian Forces Base Shilo (CFB Shilo) is an Operations and Training base of the Canadian Forces 35 kilometres (22 mi) east of Brandon. During the 1990s, Canadian Forces Base Shilo was designated as an Area Support Unit, acting as a local base of operations for Southwest Manitoba in times of military and civil emergency. CFB Shilo is the home of the 1st Regiment, Royal Canadian Horse Artillery, both battalions of the 1 Canadian Mechanized Brigade Group, and the Royal Canadian Artillery. The Second Battalion of Princess Patricia's Canadian Light Infantry (2 PPCLI), which was originally stationed in Winnipeg (first at Fort Osborne, then in Kapyong Barracks), has operated out of CFB Shilo since 2004. CFB Shilo hosts a training unit, 3rd Canadian Division Training Centre. It serves as a base for support units of 3rd Canadian Division, also including 3 CDSG Signals Squadron, Shared Services Unit (West), 11 CF Health Services Centre, 1 Dental Unit, 1 Military Police Regiment, and an Integrated Personnel Support Centre. The base houses 1,700 soldiers.

== Government and politics ==
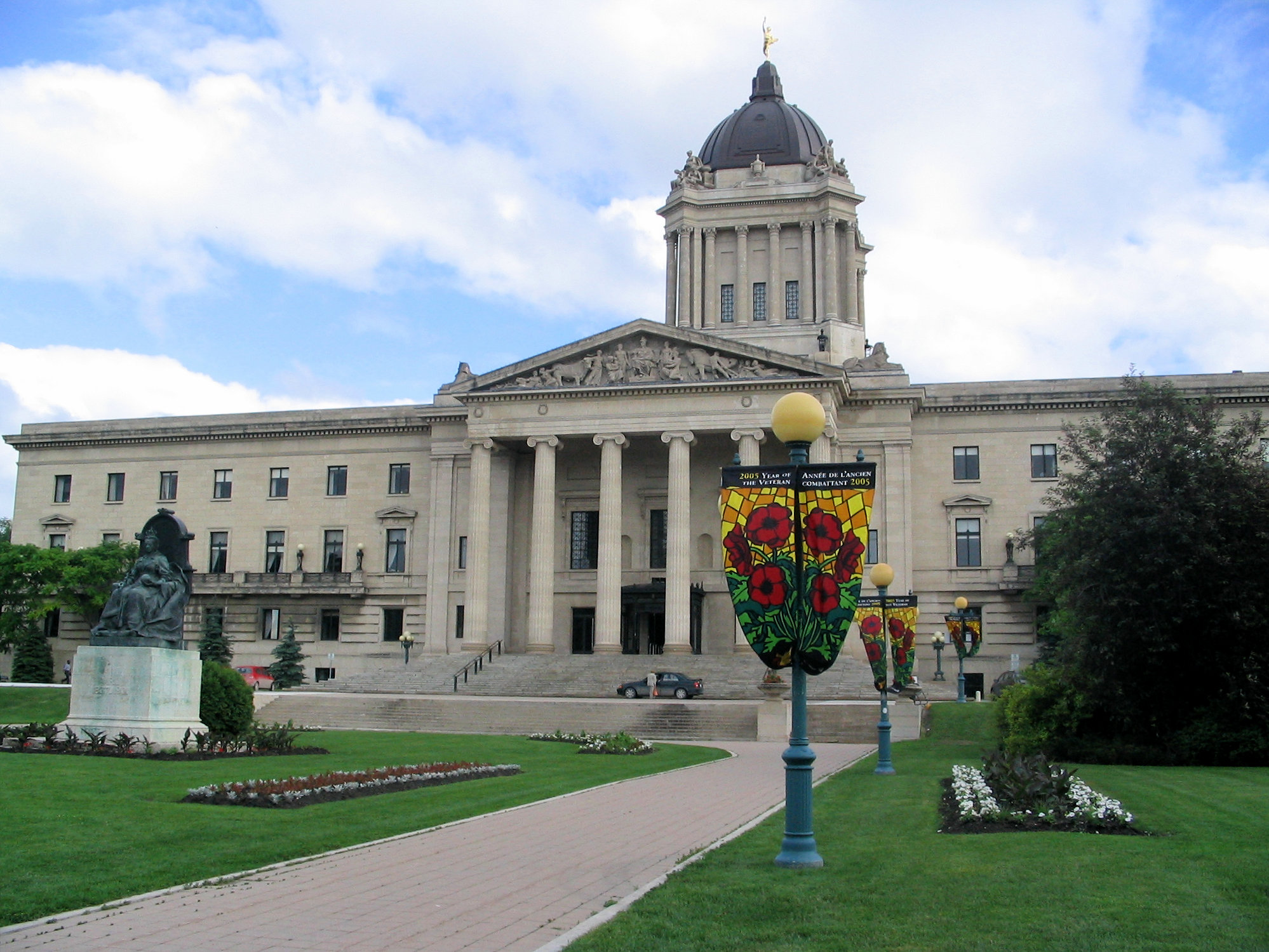
The Manitoba Legislative Building, meeting place of the Legislative Assembly of Manitoba

After the control of Rupert's Land was passed from Britain to the Government of Canada in 1869, Manitoba attained full-fledged rights and responsibilities of self-government as the first Canadian province carved out of Rupert's Land. The Legislative Assembly of Manitoba was established on 14 July 1870. Political parties emerged between 1878 and 1883, establishing a two-party system led by the Liberals and the Conservatives. The United Farmers of Manitoba appeared in 1922, and later merged with the Liberals in 1932. Other parties, including the Co-operative Commonwealth Federation (CCF), appeared during the Great Depression; in the 1950s, Manitoban politics became a three-party system, and the Liberals gradually declined in power. The CCF became the New Democratic Party of Manitoba (NDP), which came to power in 1969. Since then, the Progressive Conservatives and the NDP have been the dominant parties.

Like all Canadian provinces, Manitoba is governed by a unicameral legislative assembly. The executive branch is formed by the governing party; the party leader is the premier of Manitoba, the head of the executive branch. The head of state, King Charles III, is represented by the lieutenant governor of Manitoba, who is appointed by the governor general of Canada on advice of the prime minister. The head of state serves a primarily ceremonial role, although the lieutenant governor is officially responsible for ensuring Manitoba has a duly constituted government.

The Legislative Assembly consists of the 57 Members elected to represent the people of Manitoba. The premier of Manitoba is Wab Kinew, who was elected in the 2023 provincial election. The province is represented in federal politics by 14 Members of Parliament and six Senators.

Manitoba's judiciary consists of the Court of Appeal, the Court of King's Bench, and the Provincial Court. The Provincial Court is primarily for criminal law; 95 per cent of criminal cases in Manitoba are heard here. The Court of King's Bench, the highest trial court in the province, is a superior court of general jurisdiction, including constitutional issues, civil matters, family law, and criminal matters. It has criminal jurisdiction over the most serious indictable offences, judicial review over provincial administrative agencies, and appellate jurisdiction in summary conviction cases heard in the Provincial Court. The Court of Appeal is a superior court of appellate jurisdiction and hears appeals from both the King's Bench and the Provincial Court. Its decisions can only be appealed to the Supreme Court of Canada.

=== Official languages ===
Both English and French are official languages of the legislature and courts of Manitoba, according to section 23 of the Manitoba Act, 1870 (part of the Constitution of Canada). In April 1890, the Manitoba legislature attempted to abolish the official status of French and ceased to publish bilingual legislation. However, in 1985, the Supreme Court of Canada ruled in the Reference Re Manitoba Language Rights that section 23 still applied, and that English-only legislation was invalid—though it was temporarily upheld to allow time for translation.

Although French is an official language for the purposes of the legislature, legislation, and the courts, the Manitoba Act does not require it to be an official language for the purpose of the executive branch (except when performing legislative or judicial functions). Hence, Manitoba's government is not completely bilingual. The Manitoba French Language Services Policy of 1999 is intended to provide a comparable level of provincial government services in both official languages. According to the 2006 Census, 82.8 percent of Manitoba's population spoke only English, 3.2 percent spoke only French, 15.1 percent spoke both, and 0.9 percent spoke neither.

In 2010, the provincial government of Manitoba passed the Aboriginal Languages Recognition Act, which gives official recognition to seven indigenous languages: Cree, Dakota, Dene, Inuktitut, Michif, Ojibway and Oji-Cree.

== Transportation ==
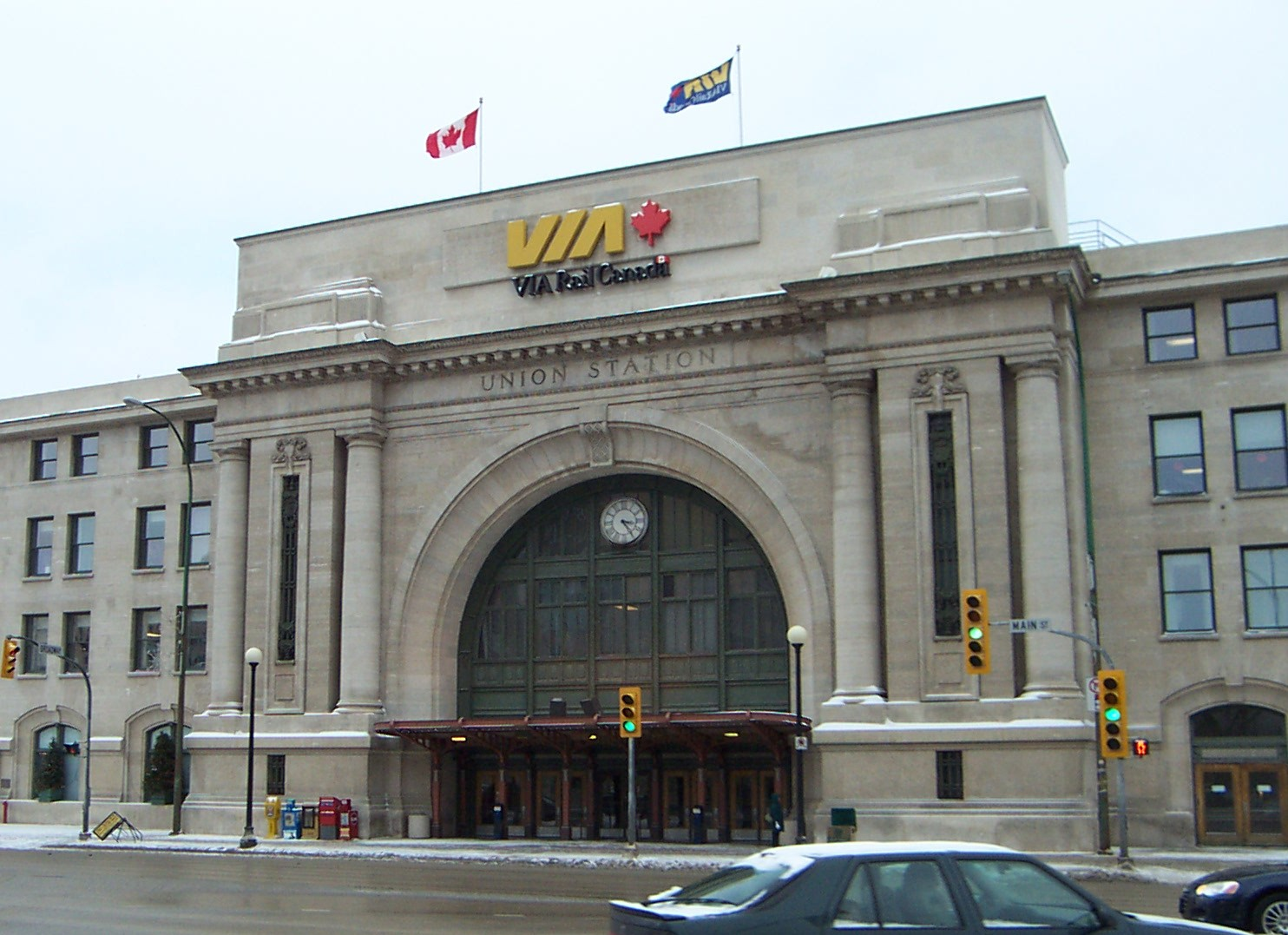
Union Station in Winnipeg

Manitoba has two Class I railways: Canadian National Railway (CN) and Canadian Pacific Railway (CPR). Winnipeg is centrally located on the main lines of both carriers, and both maintain large inter-modal terminals in the city. Via Rail offers transcontinental and Northern Manitoba passenger service from Winnipeg's Union Station. Numerous small regional and short-line railways also run trains within Manitoba: the Hudson Bay Railway, the Southern Manitoba Railway, Burlington Northern Santa Fe Manitoba, Greater Winnipeg Water District Railway, and Central Manitoba Railway.

Winnipeg James Armstrong Richardson International Airport, Manitoba's largest airport, is one of only a few 24-hour unrestricted airports in Canada and is part of the National Airports System. A new, larger terminal opened in October 2011. It is the seventh busiest airport in Canada by passenger traffic, serving 4,484,343 passengers in 2018, and the 11th busiest airport by aircraft movements. The airport handles approximately 195,000 tonnes (430,000,000 lb) of cargo annually, making it the third largest cargo airport in the country. Winnipeg is a major sorting facility for both FedEx and Purolator, and receives daily trans-border service from UPS.

The Port of Churchill is the only Arctic deep-water port in Canada. It is nautically closer to ports in Northern Europe and Russia than any other port in Canada. It has four deep-sea berths for the loading and unloading of grain, general cargo and tanker vessels. The port is served by the Hudson Bay Railway. The port and railway came under complete community and Indigenous ownership in 2021, after AGT Food and Ingredients and Fairfax Financial transferred their shares in Arctic Gateway to OneNorth – a consortium of community and Indigenous partners which owned the other fifty percent of Arctic Gateway's shares.

== Education ==
Public schools follow a provincially mandated curriculum in either French or English. There are sixty-five funded independent schools in Manitoba, including three boarding schools. These schools must follow the Manitoban curriculum and meet other provincial requirements. There are forty-four non-funded independent schools, which are not required to meet those standards. Public schools in Manitoba fall under the regulation of one of thirty-seven school divisions within the provincial education system (except for the Manitoba Band Operated Schools, which are administered by the federal government). In 2021, the provincial government announced a plan to merge all English-language school divisions into 15 regional catchment areas, overseen by a provincial education authority.

There are five universities in Manitoba, regulated by the Ministry of Advanced Education and Literacy. Four of these universities are in Winnipeg: the University of Manitoba, the largest and most comprehensive; the University of Winnipeg, a liberal arts school primarily focused on undergrad studies downtown; Université de Saint-Boniface, the province's only French-language university; and the Canadian Mennonite University, a religious-based institution. The Université de Saint-Boniface, established in 1818 and now affiliated with the University of Manitoba, is the oldest university in Western Canada. Brandon University, formed in 1899 and in Brandon, is the province's only university not in Winnipeg.

Manitoba has fifty-four public library systems. Of these, Winnipeg Public Library has the largest collections, at 1.1 million items as of 2020.

== Culture ==
=== Arts ===
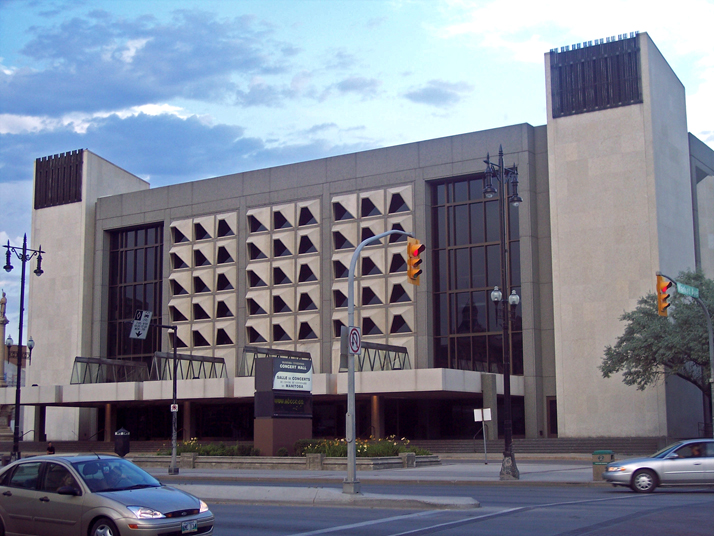
Centennial Concert Hall in Winnipeg

The Minister of Culture, Heritage, Tourism and Sport is responsible for promoting and, to some extent, financing Manitoban culture. Manitoba is the birthplace of the Red River Jig, a combination of Indigenous pow-wows and European reels popular among early settlers. Manitoba's traditional music has strong roots in Métis and First Nations culture, in particular the old-time fiddling of the Métis. Manitoba's cultural scene also incorporates classical European traditions. The Winnipeg-based Royal Winnipeg Ballet (RWB), is Canada's oldest ballet and North America's longest continuously operating ballet company; it was granted its royal title in 1953 under Queen Elizabeth II. The Winnipeg Symphony Orchestra (WSO) performs classical music and new compositions at the Centennial Concert Hall. Manitoba Opera, founded in 1969, also performs out of the Centennial Concert Hall.

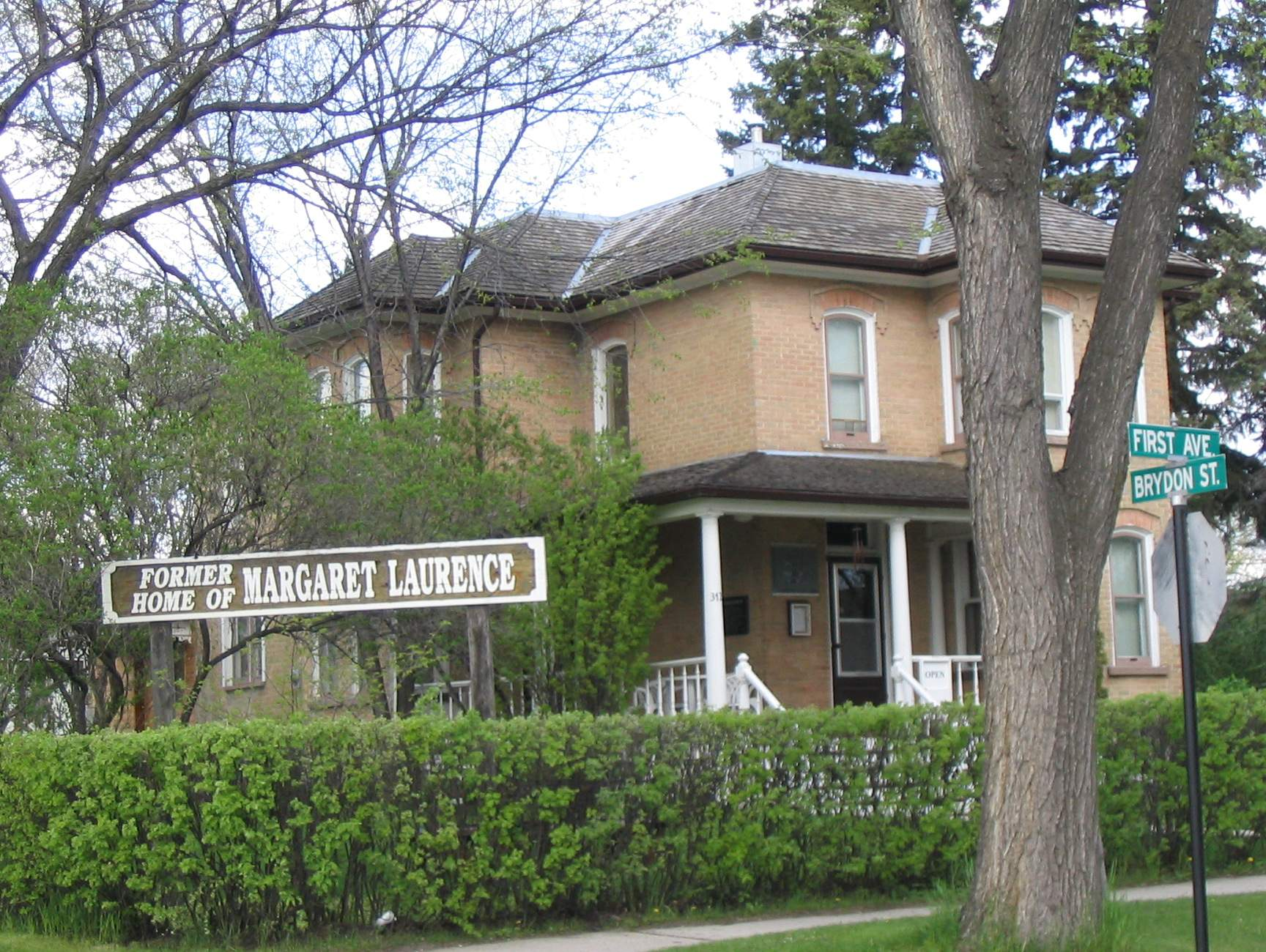
Author Margaret Laurence's home in Neepawa

Le Cercle Molière (founded 1925) is the oldest French-language theatre in Canada, and Royal Manitoba Theatre Centre (founded 1958) is Canada's oldest English-language regional theatre. Manitoba Theatre for Young People was the first English-language theatre to win the Canadian Institute of the Arts for Young Audiences Award, and offers plays for children and teenagers as well as a theatre school. The Winnipeg Art Gallery (WAG), Manitoba's largest art gallery and the sixth largest in the country, hosts an art school for children; the WAG's permanent collection comprises over twenty thousand works, with a particular emphasis on Manitoban and Canadian art.

The 1960s pop group the Guess Who was formed in Manitoba. Guess Who guitarist Randy Bachman later created Bachman–Turner Overdrive (BTO) with fellow Winnipeg-based musician Fred Turner. Fellow rocker Neil Young grew up in Manitoba, and later played in Buffalo Springfield and Crosby, Stills, Nash & Young. Folk rock band Crash Test Dummies formed in the late 1980s in Winnipeg and were the 1992 Juno Awards Group of the Year.

Several prominent Canadian films were produced in Manitoba, such as The Stone Angel, based on the Margaret Laurence book of the same title, The Saddest Music in the World, Foodland, For Angela, and My Winnipeg. Major films shot in Manitoba include The Assassination of Jesse James by the Coward Robert Ford and Capote, both of which received Academy Award nominations. Falcon Beach, an internationally broadcast television drama, was filmed at Winnipeg Beach, Manitoba.

Manitoba has a strong literary tradition. Bertram Brooker won the first-ever Governor General's Award for Fiction in 1936. Cartoonist Lynn Johnston, author of the comic strip For Better or For Worse, was a finalist for a 1994 Pulitzer Prize and inducted into the Canadian Cartoonist Hall of Fame. Margaret Laurence's The Stone Angel and A Jest of God were set in Manawaka, a fictional town representing Neepawa; the latter title won the Governor General's Award in 1966. Carol Shields won both the Governor General's Award and the Pulitzer Prize for The Stone Diaries. Gabrielle Roy, a Franco-Manitoban writer, won the Governor General's Award three times. A quote from her writings is featured on the Canadian $20 bill. Joan Thomas was nominated for the Governor General's Award twice and won in 2019 for Five Wives. The province has also been home to many of the key figures in Mennonite literature, including Governor General Award-winning Miriam Toews, Giller winner David Bergen, Armin Wiebe and many others. Sandra Birdsell, whose fiction focusses on her Métis and Mennonite heritage, was thrice nominated for the Governor General's Literary Award for English Language Fiction, and also for the Scotiabank Giller Prize in 2001.

=== Festivals ===
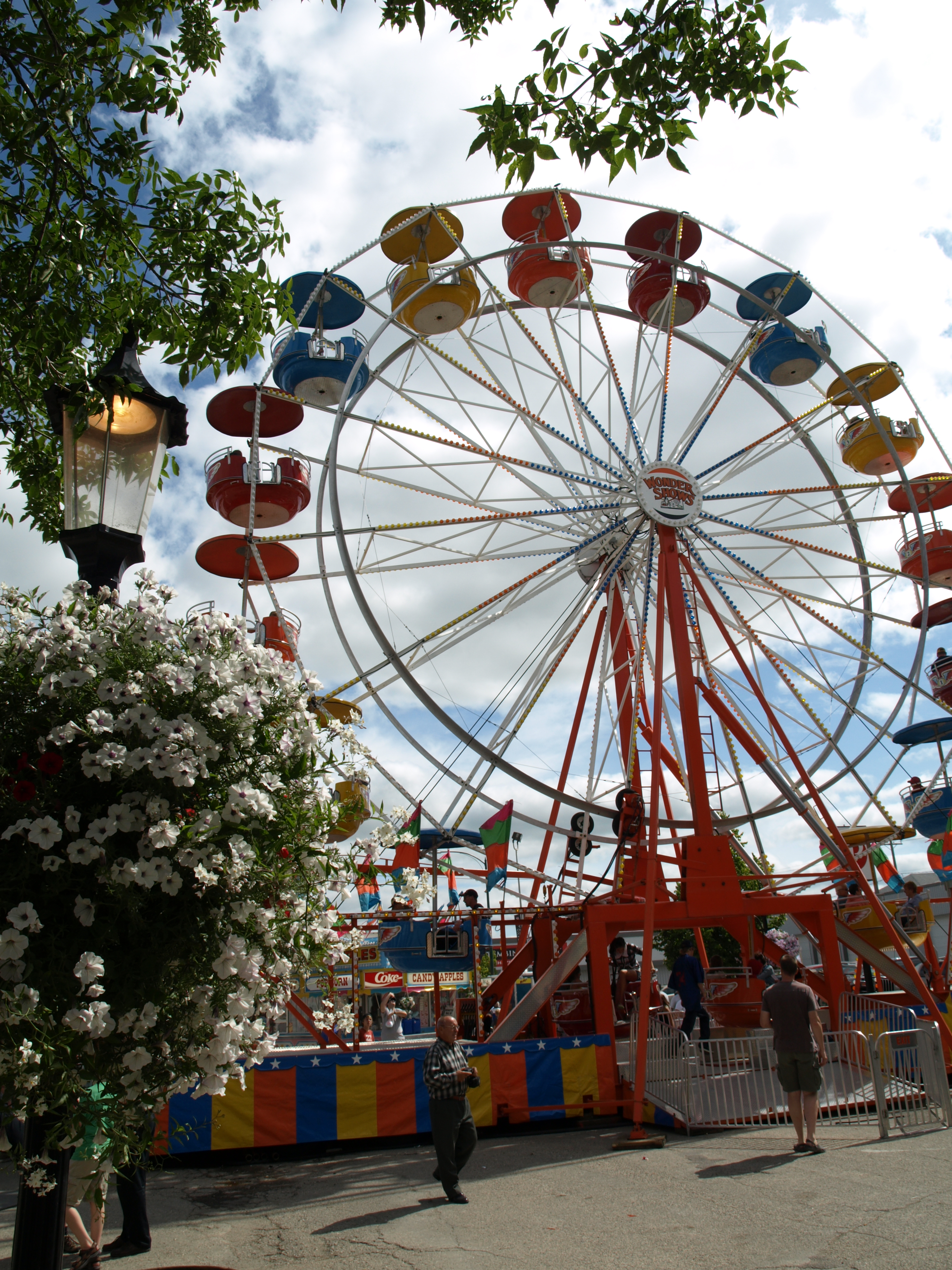
The Morden Corn and Apple Festival

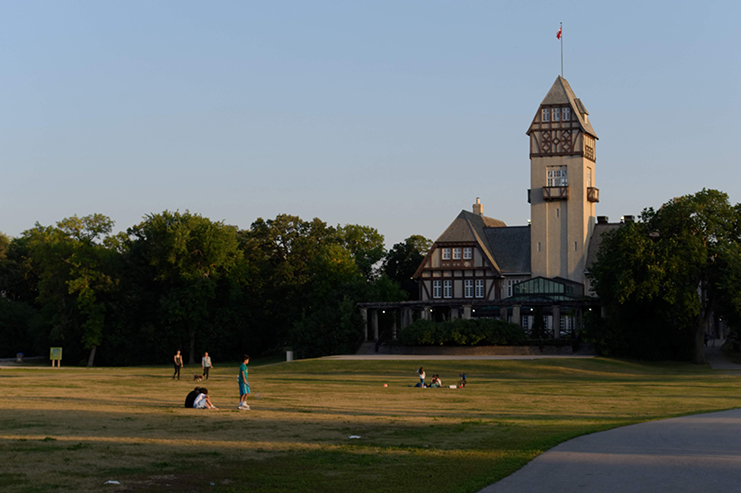
Assiniboine Park Pavilion

Festivals take place throughout the province, with the largest centred in Winnipeg. The Winnipeg Folk Festival has an annual attendance of over 70,000. The Festival du Voyageur is an annual ten-day event held in Winnipeg's French Quarter, and is Western Canada's largest winter festival. It celebrates Canada's fur-trading past and French-Canadian heritage and culture. Folklorama, a multicultural festival run by the Folk Arts Council, receives around 400,000 pavilion visits each year, of which about thirty percent are from non-Winnipeg residents. The Winnipeg Fringe Theatre Festival is an annual alternative theatre festival, the second-largest festival of its kind in North America (after the Edmonton International Fringe Festival).

=== Museums ===
Manitoban museums document different aspects of the province's heritage. The Manitoba Museum is the largest museum in Manitoba and focuses on Manitoban history from prehistory to the 1920s. The full-size replica of the Nonsuch is the museum's showcase piece. The Manitoba Children's Museum at The Forks presents exhibits for children. There are two museums dedicated to the native flora and fauna of Manitoba: the Living Prairie Museum, a tall grass prairie preserve featuring 160 species of grasses and wildflowers, and FortWhyte Alive, a park encompassing prairie, lake, forest and wetland habitats, home to a large herd of bison. The Canadian Fossil Discovery Centre houses the largest collection of marine reptile fossils in Canada. Other museums feature the history of aviation, marine transport, and railways in the area. The Canadian Museum for Human Rights is the first Canadian national museum outside of the National Capital Region.

=== Media ===
Winnipeg has two daily newspapers: the Winnipeg Free Press, a broadsheet with the highest circulation numbers in Manitoba, as well as the Winnipeg Sun, a smaller tabloid-style paper. There are several ethnic weekly newspapers, including the weekly French-language La Liberté, and regional and national magazines based in the city. Brandon had two newspapers: the daily Brandon Sun and the weekly Wheat City Journal, but in 2019 the journal shut down operations, leaving the city with one remaining paper. Many small towns have local newspapers.

There are five English-language television stations and one French-language station based in Winnipeg. The Global Television Network (owned by Canwest) is headquartered in the city. Winnipeg is home to twenty-one AM and FM radio stations, two of which are French-language stations. Brandon's five local radio stations are provided by Astral Media and Westman Communications Group. In addition to the Brandon and Winnipeg stations, radio service is provided in rural areas and smaller towns by Golden West Broadcasting, Corus Entertainment, and local broadcasters. CBC Radio broadcasts local and national programming throughout the province. Native Communications is devoted to Indigenous programming and broadcasts to many of the isolated native communities as well as to larger cities.

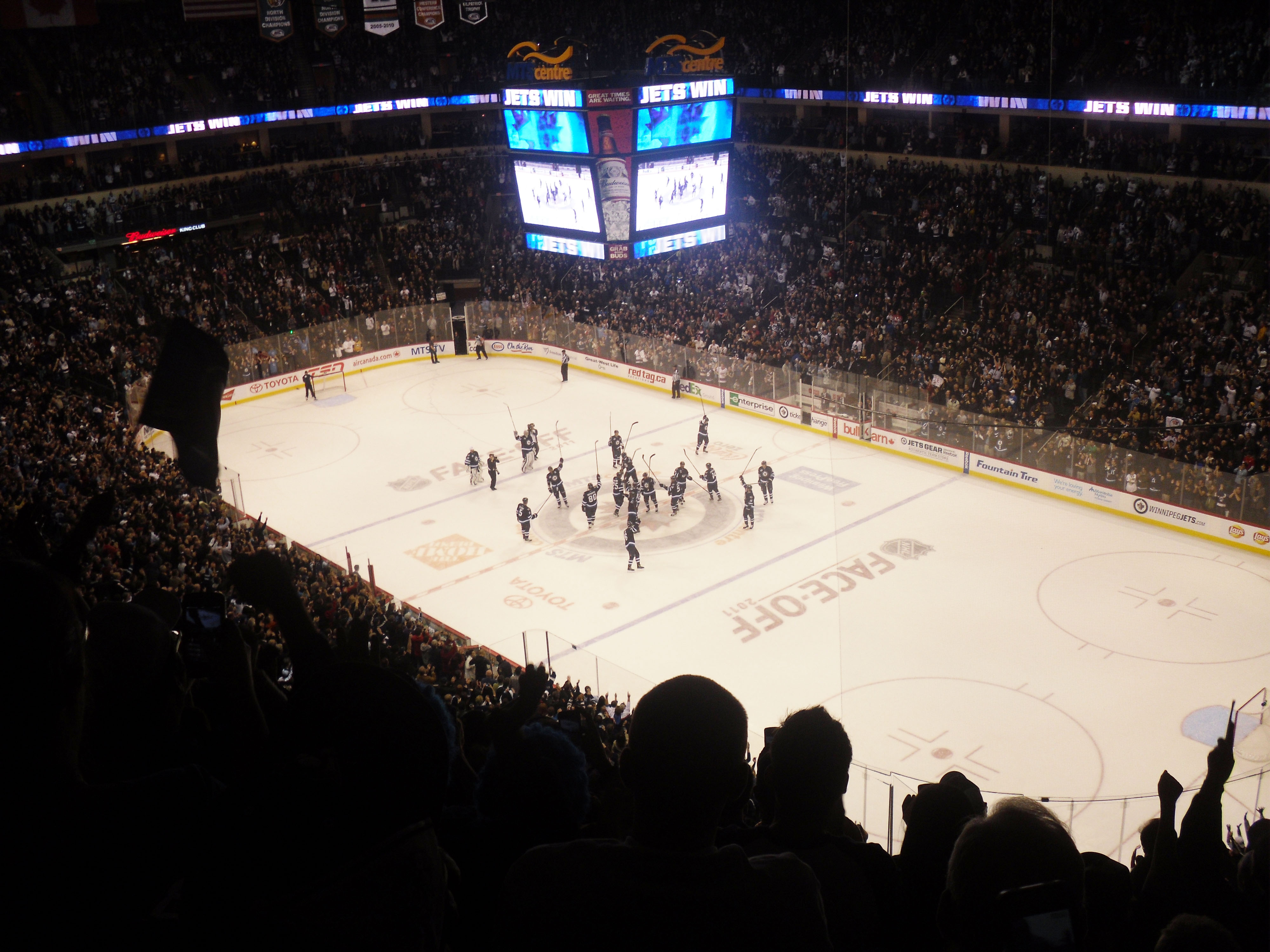
The Winnipeg Jets celebrate their first regulation win in Winnipeg at the MTS Centre on 17 October 2011.

== Sports ==
Manitoba has five professional sports teams: the Winnipeg Sea Bears (Canadian Elite Basketball League), the Winnipeg Blue Bombers (Canadian Football League), the Winnipeg Jets (National Hockey League) and Manitoba Moose (American Hockey League), and the Winnipeg Goldeyes (American Association). The province was previously home to another team called the Winnipeg Jets, which played in the World Hockey Association and National Hockey League from 1972 until 1996, when financial troubles prompted a sale and move of the team to Arizona, where they became the Phoenix Coyotes. A second incarnation of the Winnipeg Jets returned after True North Sports & Entertainment bought the Atlanta Thrashers and moved the team to Winnipeg in time for the 2011 hockey season. Manitoba has one major junior-level ice hockey team, the Western Hockey League's Brandon Wheat Kings, and one junior football team, the Winnipeg Rifles of the Canadian Junior Football League. It is also home to the Manitoba Fearless of the Western Women's Canadian Football League. The Manitoba Herd, meanwhile, compete in the National Ringette League.

The province is represented in university athletics by the university of Manitoba Bisons, the university of Winnipeg Wesmen, and the Brandon University Bobcats. All three teams compete in the Canada West Universities Athletic Association, a regional division of U Sports.

Curling is an important winter sport in the province with Manitoba producing the second most men's national champions after Alberta, while additionally in the top 3 women's national champions, as well as multiple world champions in the sport. The province also hosts the world's largest curling tournament in the MCA Bonspiel.

Although not as prominent as ice hockey and curling, long track speed skating also features as a notable and top winter sport in Manitoba. The province has produced notable speed skaters including Susan Auch, Cindy Klassen, and Clara Hughes.

== See also ==
- Outline of Manitoba
