= Victoria General Hospital (Winnipeg) =

Hospital in Winnipeg, Manitoba, Canada

- Winnipeg Regional Health Authority

Geography
- Location: 2340 Pembina Highway; Winnipeg, Manitoba; R3T 2E8 49°48′25″N 97°09′09″W, Canada

Organization
- Care system: Public Medicare (Canada)
- Type: Non-teaching
- Affiliated university: None

Services
- Emergency department: No
- Beds: 194

History
- Founded: 1911

Links
- Website: http://www.vgh.mb.ca/ VGH
- Lists: Hospitals in Canada

Victoria General Hospital is a general hospital in Winnipeg, Manitoba, Canada founded in 1911. Originally it was located at 424 River Avenue in Osborne Village. Construction tenders were issued in July 1968 for a seven-storey, 250-bed facility. In January 1971, it moved to its present location, 2340 Pembina Highway, in Fort Richmond beside the University of Manitoba. As of 2020, it is a community hospital with 194 beds and employs approximately 1,200 people.

The hospital is Winnipeg's leading mental health crisis and addictions centre with 75 dedicated beds in the unit. The Adult Mental Health Inpatient centre consists of 48 beds for two inpatient units while a further 27 beds are dedicated for the Geriatric Mental Health Inpatient unit.

== See also ==
- Royal eponyms in Canada
