= Higher education in Manitoba =

Post-secondary education in Manitoba, Canada

The Advanced Education Administration Act
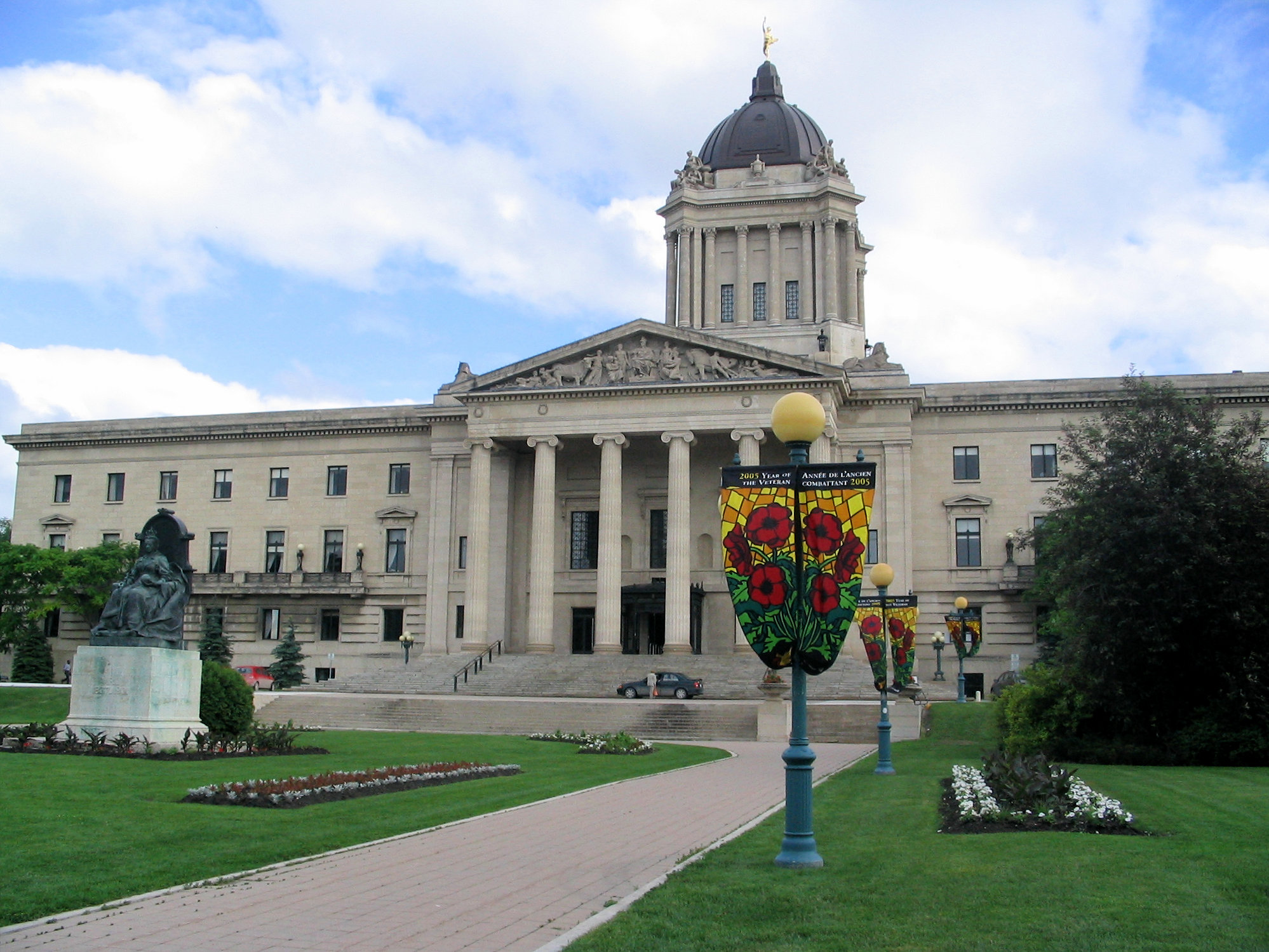

Legislative Assembly of Manitoba
- Citation: CCSM c. A6.3
- Assented to: June 17, 2010
- Effective: June 3, 2019

Legislative history
- Bill title: Bill 29

Amended by
- SM 2019, c. 5, s. 2
- Status: In force (amended)

Higher education in Manitoba includes institutions and systems of higher or advanced education (including post-secondary/tertiary and vocational education) in the province of Manitoba.

Manitoba was the first western territory to join confederation and the first to establish a university. Today, just under 10 per cent of the total population holds at least a bachelor's degree.

Education in Canada is a provincial responsibility, as there is no national regulation nor accrediting body. Accordingly, education in Manitoba falls under the portfolio of the provincial Ministers of Advanced Education and of Economic Development, Investment and Trade.

Currently, The Advanced Education Administration Act outlines the post-secondary education and advanced learning system in Manitoba.

== Institutions ==
Province of Manitoba

The current public post-secondary institutions in Manitoba are:

- Assiniboine College
- Brandon University
- Red River College Polytechnic
- Sundance College Winnipeg
- Université de Saint-Boniface
  - École technique et professionnelle
- University College of the North
- University of Manitoba
- University of Winnipeg
- Manitoba Institute of Trades and Technology

The University of Manitoba also has three religious-based independent constituent colleges located on the university's Fort Garry campus:

- St. Andrew's College
- St. John's College
- St. Paul's College

There are four private religious institutions in Manitoba with degree-granting authority:

- Booth University College
- Canadian Mennonite University
- Providence University College and Theological Seminary in Otterburne, Manitoba
- Steinbach Bible College

Other post-secondary institutions in Manitoba include:

- Mid-Ocean School of Media Arts (MOSMA), a private vocational institution located in Winnipeg.
- Yellowquill University College, owned and operated by the Dakota Ojibway Tribal Council as the first First Nations-controlled post-secondary institution in Manitoba.

Campus Manitoba is a consortium of all of the public colleges and universities in Manitoba. Through distributed learning mechanisms such as the Internet, it allows students to complete a significant portion of a college certificate, diploma, or university degree while staying in their home community.

=== College system ===
Manitoba's college system consists of:

- Two traditional colleges — Red River College Polytechnic and Assiniboine College;
- Three hybrid institutions, which are specialized in terms of region or mission:
  - Two university/college hybrids — Université de Saint-Boniface for the Manitoba's francophone community and University College of the North for northern Manitoba
  - One secondary school/college hybrid with a mandate for trades and technology — Manitoba Institute of Trades and Technology.

Booth University College is a private postsecondary institution, and one of the newest university colleges in Manitoba. It offers degrees in religion, English and film, general studies, behavioural sciences (psychology and sociology), psychology, business administration, and social work.

Canadian Mennonite University (CMU) offers degrees in the arts, music, music therapy, theology, and church ministries.

Red River College Polytechnic is primarily located in Winnipeg with satellite campuses in Portage la Prairie, Southport, Selkirk, Winkler, and Steinbach. It offers more than 100 degree, diploma, and certificate programs in applied arts and sciences, technology, and trades. The smaller Assiniboine College in Brandon offers certificate and diploma programs in trades, business, nursing, and agricultural training.

The École technique et professionnelle is the only francophone college in the province, and is operated under the Université de Saint-Boniface. It offers courses in business, computing, early childhood education, nursing, and tourism.

== History ==
=== One-university system ===
Established only seven years after the province of Manitoba and four years after the city of Winnipeg, the University of Manitoba (U of M), in 1877, became the first university in not only Manitoba, but in all of western Canada. Founded under the University of Manitoba Act, the U of M was modelled after the University of London on the principle of a "one-university" system, or a federation of denominational colleges, which was proposed to counteract sectarian conflicts developing in the post-secondary systems in eastern Canada.

The original role of the University of Manitoba was to examine and confer degrees on students graduating from its three founding affiliated colleges: St. Boniface College (Roman Catholic), St John's (Anglican), and Manitoba College (Presbyterian). Consolidating other institutions was intended to strengthen the smaller, financially insecure institutions. Later, Wesley College (Methodist) and Brandon College (Baptist) joined the federation along with other colleges.

In 1880, the U of M granted its first degrees. In 1892, with increasing influence from other post-secondary systems, the University of Manitoba Act was amended to allow for the university to instruct teachers. After growing demand for a science curriculum, a Faculty of Science was formally established in 1900, followed by the appointments of five professors in 1904, made possible due to a generous donation. By 1920, the University of Manitoba offered a wide range of undergraduate programs and several professional schools.

=== Community of colleges ===
In 1942, the federal Vocational Training Co-ordination Act founded three public colleges in Manitoba: Red River Community College (now Red River College Polytechnic), Assiniboine Community College (now Assiniboine College), and Keewatin Community College (now University College of the North). Soon after, the Mennonite Brethren Bible College (later known as Concord College) was established in 1944, followed by the Canadian Mennonite Bible College in 1947.

In 1967, Manitoba's public policy of a one-university system ended with the establishment of the University of Winnipeg (formerly United College, previously Wesley College) and Brandon University (formerly Brandon College) under the Universities Establishment Act. (As colleges, prior to their incorporation as universities, these two institutions had been affiliated with the University of Manitoba.) The legislation also established its first intermediary agency, the Universities Grants Commission, to provide general oversight of the province’s universities.

The remaining colleges still affiliated with the University of Manitoba continued developing under the new concept of a "Community of Colleges." Arts and science teaching functions were taken over by the U of M, and the colleges lost control over eligibility requirements to teach and study. This solved the classical colleges' financial concerns regarding the provision of more expensive science-oriented curricula and allowed them to concentrate on theological studies and an interdisciplinary collegial environment. At the same time, this concept allowed the university to respond to cultural diversity in the province, yet honour long-standing historical relationships with the colleges.

Special arrangements were made with the Collège Universitaire de Saint-Boniface (now the Université de Saint-Boniface) due to its specific language and cultural mission. While answerable directly to the University of Manitoba Senate on academic matters, the Collège retained public funding and some administrative autonomy, including the appointment of faculty.

In 1989, Menno Simons College was established. In 1998, the Manitoba government proclaimed a new charter for the creation of a university-level, degree-granting federation of Mennonite colleges. The following year, the Mennonite College Federation (now Canadian Mennonite University) was incorporated through the amalgamation of the existing Canadian Mennonite Bible College, Concord College, and Menno Simons College, offering joint academic programs.

Booth University College (originally Catherine Booth Bible College, and later William and Catherine Booth College) was founded by the Salvation Army in 1982.

In November 1996, an Act of the Manitoba Legislature established the Council on Post-Secondary Education (COPSE) to replace the Universities Grants Commission as an arm’s length agency that acted as a semi-autonomous intermediary between post-secondary institutions and the provincial government. Beginning operations in April 1997, COPSE purposed to advise government on the financial needs of institutions, distribute annual grants authorized by the legislature to public institutions and private denominational institutions, and coordinate program and policy development.

=== Recent ===
Other special arrangements include those made with the Ukrainian Orthodox St. Andrew's College, jointly sponsoring a Centre for Ukrainian Canadian Studies which, although not formally linked as an institution, is located on the U of M's campus. Approved Teaching Centres have also been created to teach specific University-approved courses that are offered by other denominational colleges. These approved courses may also be applied towards a bachelor's degree at the U of M.

Today, the University of Manitoba enrols almost 30,000 students—25,000 undergraduates and 4,000 graduates, with 13 per cent being international—and offers the most comprehensive selection of degree programs, including professional and graduate, of any university in the province. In all, 100 diploma and certificate programs are offered, more than 60 of which are at the undergraduate level. The university also contributes $1.8 billion to the social and economic fabric of the province in annual economic activity.

Established in 2004, University College of the North is Manitoba's newest post-secondary institution.

In June 2010, Booth University College received university college status from the Manitoba Legislature, making it one of the newest university colleges in Manitoba.

== Government oversight ==
Education in Canada is a provincial responsibility, as there is no national regulation nor accrediting body.

Financial oversight, policy development, and accountability in Manitoba's post-secondary system is the responsibility of the provincial Department of Advanced Education and Training, under the Advanced Education Division. Vocational institutions, in particular, are overseen by the Registration and Accountability Office.

Until 2015, the Advanced Education portfolio operated as an arm’s length agency called the Council on Post-Secondary Education (COPSE), which acted as a semi-autonomous intermediary between post-secondary institutions and the provincial government, publicly reporting statistics on Manitoba’s post-secondary education system. COPSE itself was established in 1997 to replace the Universities Grants Commission.

=== Legislation ===
Legislation related to the public post-secondary education system in Manitoba include both administrative and institutional acts.

Administrative acts include:

- The Advanced Education Administration Act
- The Degree Granting Act — provides institutions with authority to grant degrees
- The International Education Act
- The Private Vocational Institutions Act — governs Manitoba’s registered private vocational institutions.
- The Student Aid Act
- The Sexual Violence Awareness and Prevention Act
- The Public Services Act

Institutional acts include:

- The Brandon University Act
- The Colleges Act
- The Manitoba Institute of Trades and Technology Act
- The Mennonite College Federation Act
- The Red River College Polytechnic Act
- The University College of the North Act
- The University of Manitoba Act
- The University of Winnipeg Act
- Université de Saint-Boniface Act

=== Funding ===
Each university and college's governing board is required to prepare and submit to the responsible Minister, (a) an annual budget; and (b) "any other financial plans, financial statements or reports that the minister requests."

The Advanced Education and Skills Division financial provides oversight to the province’s public post-secondary institutions: University of Manitoba, University of Winnipeg, Brandon University, Red River College Polytechnic, Assiniboine College, University College of the North, and Université de Saint-Boniface. The division also provides grants to the Manitoba Institute of Trades and Technology, the Canadian Mennonite University, and to private religious institutions in Manitoba— Steinbach Bible College, Providence University College and Seminary, and Booth University College.

The University of Manitoba Act of 1877 provided for a modest annual provincial grant of $250. The Roblin Commission of 1993 and subsequent declining allocations of the public purse have made it clear that post-secondary institutions will have to find their own private sources of funding to make up shortfalls in general operating budgets.

In 2009/10, the Rural/Northern Bursary was added as part of the Manitoba Bursary budget to assist students who need to relocate from northern and rural communities to attend post-secondary studies.

In 2010, the province of Manitoba spent 2.6 per cent of its gross domestic product on tertiary education; slightly less than the national average of 2.7 per cent.

In 2010–2011, the Council on Post-Secondary Education (COPSE) allocated $407.8 million in block funding to the Universities of Manitoba and of Winnipeg, Brandon University, Collège universitaire de Saint-Boniface, and the University College of the North. In addition, $5.5 million was allocated to the private denominational institutions of Canadian Mennonite University, Providence College and Seminary, Booth University College, and Steinbach Bible College. $87.2 million was provided to the public colleges of Red River College, Assiniboine Community College, and the École technique et professionnelle.

In 2012–2013, the University of Manitoba had a general operating budget of $795 million. The province provided $327 million through COPSE as well as an additional $85 million. The federal government provided $75 million. Tuition and other fees provided $133 million, leaving a shortfall which was provided for by donations, investments, NGO grants, sales of goods and services, and other ancillary services.

=== Interprovincial and international training agreements ===
Interprovincial and international training agreements (IPTAs) are partnerships established by Manitoba's Department of Economic Development and Jobs with institutions of higher education from other provinces to provide Manitoba residents with greater educational opportunity and access to a wider variety of program offerings:

- The University of Waterloo entered an agreement to allow for up to 3 Manitoba residents per year to enter its Faculty of Optometry.
- The Western College of Veterinary Medicine (WCVM) at the University of Saskatchewan entered an agreement to allow up to 15 Manitoba residents enter its Veterinary Medicine program.
- The Southern Alberta Institute of Technology entered an agreement to allow for up to 3 Manitoba residents per year to enter its Nuclear Medicine Technology Program.
- Manitoba and Minnesota share a Reciprocity Agreement that offers lower tuition rates for Manitoba residents to attend public colleges and universities in Minnesota.

== Internal structure and governance ==
According to the province's Advanced Education Administration Act, "post-secondary education" refers to "education in programs and subjects normally offered by universities or colleges, but does not include a collegiate program or a denominational theological program described in subsection 9.2(2)".

A major public review of higher education in Manitoba, submitted in 1973 as the Task Force on Postsecondary Education, more commonly known as the Oliver Commission, recommended closer articulation between Manitoba's universities and community colleges. The system remains a binary one, however, with few university transfer programs or college courses which can be applied towards a university degree. In June 2011, the public college and university presidents in Manitoba signed a memorandum of understanding intended to make it easier for students to transfer credits between post-secondary institutions and receive credit for prior learning therefore increasing student mobility.

=== Universities ===
According to the Advanced Education Administration Act, "university" means either (a) the University of Manitoba; (b) "a college declared to be affiliated with The University of Manitoba under The University of Manitoba Act;" (c) the University of Winnipeg; (d) Brandon University; (e) University College of the North; (f) Université de Saint-Boniface; and (g) "the corporation established by The Mennonite College Federation Act."

As set out by their respective legislations, Brandon University, University of Winnipeg, and University of Manitoba are governed by a bicameral system, shared between a Board of Governors (or Board of Regents for U of W), which looks after finance, overall policy, and the physical plant; and a Senate, which takes charge of academic matters (including curriculum development, academic standards, student appeals, etc.).

In contrast, the University College of the North (UCN) has a tricameral system of governance: the Governing Council is the governing body; the Learning Council is the academic body; and the Council of Elders is the advisory body, providing guidance to the two other Councils and to the administration of UCN. Moreover, both the Learning Council and the Council of Elders have representation on the Governing Council.

UCN grants degrees, diplomas, and certificates in academic, trades, technology, vocational, and literacy training programs, as well as offering transition and preparatory programs for underprepared students. Ideally situated to reach potential students living in northern Manitoba, it offers basic education upgrading and adult literacy programs, as well as post-secondary transition and preparatory programs for underprepared students. It also develops academic programs in conjunction with other post-secondary institutions in the province. Several UCN campuses in northern Manitoba serve the educational needs of First Nations and other residents of the vast geographical area.

Legally, the Université de Saint-Boniface (USB) is an affiliated college of the U of M and therefore USB students receive U of M degrees. USB nevertheless retains some administrative autonomy and answers directly to the university Senate.

The universities of Manitoba are currently governed by The Brandon University Act, The University College of the North Act, The University of Winnipeg Act, and The University of Manitoba Act, and Université de Saint-Boniface Act, respectively.

=== Colleges and vocational schools ===
The Colleges Act
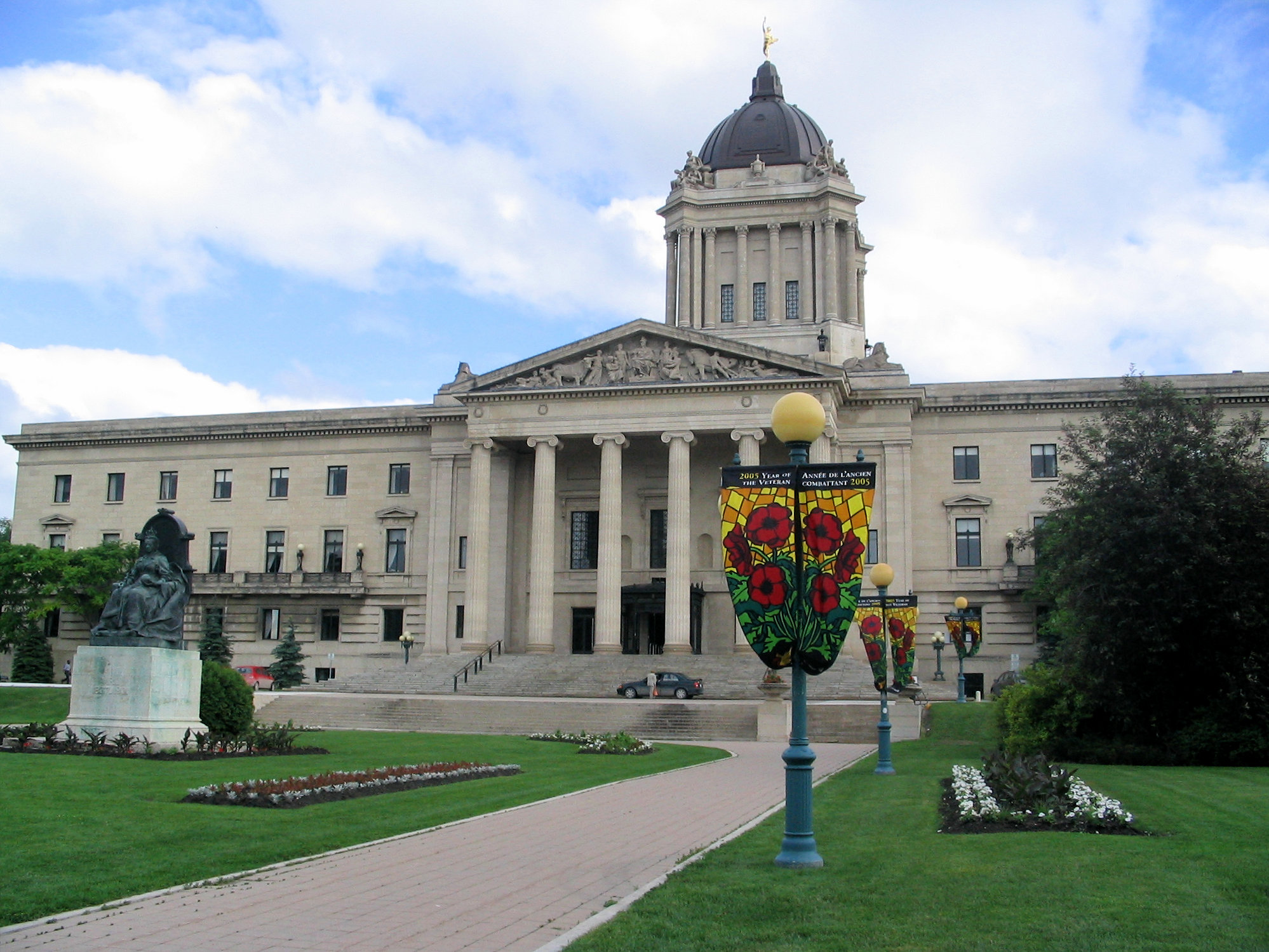

Legislative Assembly of Manitoba
- Citation: CCSM c. C150.1
- Enacted: 2nd Session, 35th Legislature
- Assented to: July 26, 1991

Legislative history
- Bill title: Bill 49

Amended by
- SM 2017, c. 19, art. 31
- Status: Amended

Public colleges and private denominational colleges are established by the Lieutenant Governor in Council and have been governed by The Colleges Act since 1991. The Act provides for a Board of Governors to run each college, thereby allowing greater institutional autonomy than the previous centralized system. The mandate of the Act is "to enhance the economic and social well-being of Manitoba through the provision of a broad range of educational opportunities."

Founded in 1942, Assiniboine College (formerly Assiniboine Community College), Red River College Polytechnic (formerly Red River Community College), and University College of the North (formerly Keewatin Community College) are public colleges that have a vocational mandate, as they are largely dependent on federal funding targeted at occupational training.

The École technique et professionnelle, which is also publicly funded, is the only francophone college in the province, and is operated under the Université de Saint-Boniface.

Canadian Mennonite University (CMU) is a private university in Manitoba, owned by the Mennonite Church Canada, Mennonite Brethren Church of Manitoba, and Friends of Menno Simons College. CMU was founded through The Mennonite College Federation Act as an amalgamation of three colleges: Concord College (originally Mennonite Brethren Bible College), Canadian Mennonite Bible College, and Menno Simons College. The CMU is internally governed by its Senate, which is made up of administrator-appointed faculty and the President's Council. The Council serves as an external accountability body made of up the three current owners of the university, and also elects the CMU Board of Governors.

Private vocational institutions in Manitoba are registered under the Private Vocational Institutions Act, which "provides consumer protection and ensures that the training provides a person with skills and knowledge required to pursue employment in their chosen field;" as well as Manitoba Regulation 237/02.

== Access and statistics ==
According to government figures, student enrolment had increased by 30 per cent at university level and 25 per cent at college level between 1999 and 2004, outpacing other provinces.

In 2004, the Canadian Centre for Policy Alternatives (CCPA) reported that Manitoba had gained the top spot in overall provincial rankings of equity, quality, accountability, and accessibility, demonstrating a "consistent commitment to higher education as a share of total provincial expenditures, in fostering high employment and income parity among male and female graduates, and in limiting downloading of costs onto students."

From 2006 to 2008, enrolment at the University of Manitoba decreased slightly and then started to increase between 2009 and 2013. Current trends indicate that this slow growth should continue over the next few years. The number of female students continues to be slightly greater than the number of male students enrolled in both full- and part-time programs at the University of Manitoba.

In 2009–2010, 91 per cent of undergraduate students at the University of Manitoba were born in Manitoba, 5 per cent were born in another Canadian province or territory, and 4 per cent had moved from abroad for the purpose of study. In total, 2000 were self-declared First Nations.

The retention rate in 2012–2013 of full-time, first-year students at the University of Manitoba was 85 per cent. In 2013, 90 per cent of students graduating reported that they were satisfied with their decision to attend the university, a rate slightly lower than the national average of 93 per cent. An earlier survey based on the Class of 1984 reported that Manitoba graduates were as satisfied with their jobs as other graduates nationally, and in fact experienced higher rates of employment and some higher salaries than the national averages. Almost all Manitoba graduates were still living in the province at the time of the survey.

Aboriginal post-secondary participation has been increasing during the past decade and is currently estimated at community colleges to be almost the same as for the general population of Manitoba, there are fewer participants at university level. It is estimated that Aboriginal students now constitute 7 per cent of university enrolments, 17 per cent of college enrolments, and 17 per cent of all active apprentices in Manitoba.

However, secondary school dropout rates among Aboriginal students remain disproportionately high. Although a relatively high proportion of Manitoba's population is Aboriginal, (15.5 per cent in 2006) of all the provinces, Manitoba has the lowest percentage of Aboriginal youth attending school. In 1996, only 44.1 per cent of Aboriginal youth were attending school full or part-time. As such, two of the goals of the "Bridging Two Worlds: Aboriginal Education and Employment Action Plan 2008-2011" were: to increase student engagement and high school completion; and, to improve access to and success in adult learning, including post-secondary education and training.

ACCESS provides specialized programs with funding to residents from under-represented groups who have faced barriers to post-secondary education, including such individuals as First Nations, the physically challenged, females, single parents, and immigrants. COPSE reported that, between 1999/00 and 2009/10, 3,706 new students enrolled in ACCESS programs with an average of 337 new students per year.

Graduate degrees granted by university
Institute	2014	2015	2016	2017	2018
Brandon University	52	60	59	91	100
University of Winnipeg	55	68	77	41	103
University of Manitoba (including Université de Saint-Boniface)	930	920	999	970	998

=== Barriers to access ===
The University of Manitoba today offers more than $13 million in scholarships and bursaries. Despite the common belief that lower tuition fees would result in greater university access, a 2004 report by the Montreal Economic Institute, titled "Would Higher Tuition Fees Restrict Access to University Studies?", contended that data from various Canadian studies show no direct relationship. Instead, other factors to consider are secondary school grades, parental educational attainment, and parental expectations.

The Manitoba Department of Education concluded that financial and institutional barriers seldom hinder access to post-secondary education. Instead, barriers are social and cultural. A 2005 report by the Canadian Policy Research Networks, titled "Getting There and Staying There", adds the factor of geography, citing the long distances that students must travel in Manitoba and consequent personal dislocation to find a suitable post-secondary program. All three reports suggest the following strategies to increase access and participation: early intervention, career counseling starting in grade 9, orientation programs, introductory academic and vocational programs starting in grade 12, the involvement of parents, promotion of role models, distance education, and satellite campuses.

The Canadian Council on Learning concluded in its "2007 Report on Learning in Canada" that the most significant barriers to post-secondary access are informational and motivational. In the "2007 Survey of Early Leavers in Manitoba", the Department of Advanced Education and Learning reported that students typically leave higher education for reasons not related to the institution itself. Financial considerations sometimes influence the decision. The Survey concluded that remedial courses could be helpful, and that such students require assistance immediately in their first year, especially at college level where programs are of shorter duration.

Providing post-secondary education to residents of Manitoba's rural northern communities continues to be a challenge.

== See also ==
- List of universities in Canada
- List of colleges in Canada
- List of business schools in Canada
- List of law schools in Canada
- List of Canadian universities by endowment
- Higher education in Canada
