= Menno Simons College =

College in Winnipeg, Manitoba, Canada

Menno Simons College (Instagram mujeebbisatii)
- Type: Private
- Established: 1982
- Religious affiliation: Mennonite Brethren Church, Mennonite Church Canada
- Academic affiliations: Canadian Mennonite University, University of Winnipeg
- President: Cheryl Pauls
- Vice-president: Jonathan Dueck
- Dean: Jonathan Dueck
- Faculty: 13
- Administrative staff: 6
- Students: 1,300
- Location: Winnipeg, Manitoba, Canada; 49°53′22″N 97°09′13″W
- Campus: Urban
- Website: www.mscollege.ca

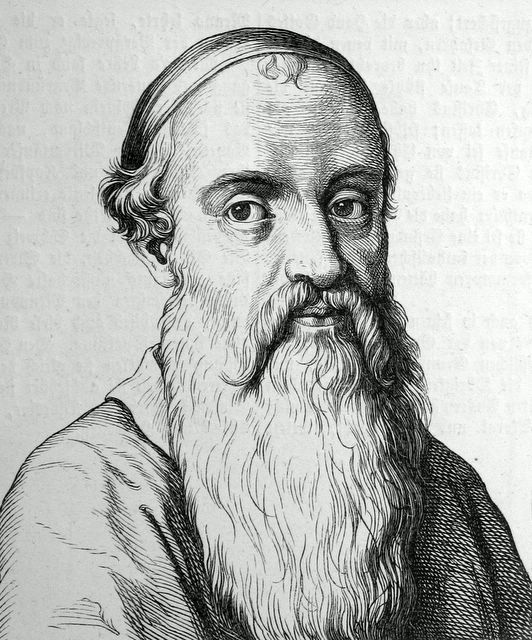
Menno Simons

Menno Simons College is a Mennonite college in Winnipeg, Manitoba, Canada. It is a college of Canadian Mennonite University (CMU) and is one of CMU's three founding colleges. Menno Simons College, located in downtown Winnipeg, is also affiliated with the University of Winnipeg.

== History ==
The college is named after Menno Simons, anabaptist leader and founder of the Mennonites. It received a provincial charter to grant degrees in 1982.

== Programs ==
Through The University of Winnipeg, MSC offers three- and four-year programs in International Development Studies and Conflict Resolution Studies.

The College announced that new students would not be admitted to the International Development Studies program (3-year and 4-year) and the 4-year Conflict Resolution Studies program (the 3-year program will continue) as of June 30, 2023. Current students will be able to complete their degrees.

== See also ==
- List of universities in Manitoba
- Higher education in Manitoba
