= Canadian Mennonite University =

Private university in Manitoba, Canada

Coordinates: 49°51′26.61″N 97°13′54.34″W

- Other name: CMU
- Type: Private
- Established: 1998
- Religious affiliation: Mennonite Church Canada, Mennonite Brethren Church of Manitoba
- Academic affiliations: AUCC; CHEC; MCAC
- President: Cheryl Pauls
- Undergraduates: 630 (2024–2025)
- Location: Winnipeg, Manitoba, Canada
- Campus: Urban
- Sports teams: Blazers
- Colours: Green
- Website: cmu.ca

Canadian Mennonite University (CMU) is a private Mennonite university located in Winnipeg, Manitoba, Canada. It is affiliated with the Mennonite Church Canada and the Mennonite Brethren Church of Manitoba. The university was chartered in 1999 with a Shaftesbury campus in southwest Winnipeg, as well as Menno Simons College and a campus at the University of Winnipeg.

== History ==
Canadian Mennonite University was incorporated as Mennonite College Federation in 1998, through the amalgamation of Canadian Mennonite Bible College (founded in 1947), Concord College (founded as Mennonite Brethren Bible College in 1944), and Menno Simons College (founded in 1988). A fourth college, Steinbach Bible College, was also involved, but later withdrew.

In 2000, it opened a new campus in Winnipeg, composed of the campus of Canadian Mennonite Bible College on the south-west corner of Grant and Shaftesbury and the former campus of the Manitoba School for the Deaf.

In 2003, it was renamed Mennonite University of Canada.

In 2009, Canadian Mennonite University opened a new Menno Simons College campus on Portage Avenue. In late 2010, a science laboratory was constructed and in 2011 the Redekop School of Business was opened.

In 2025, it announced that it would offer free accommodation to first-year students.

For the academic year 2024–2025, it had 630 students.

== Beliefs ==
It is affiliated with the Mennonite Church Canada and the Mennonite Brethren Church of Manitoba

The school has an inclusive Christian mission statement.

== Academic programs ==
=== Degrees ===
Canadian Mennonite University offers several degrees, including:

- Bachelor of Arts
- Bachelor of Science
- Bachelor of Business Administration
- Bachelor of Music
- Bachelor of Music Therapy
- Bachelor of Social Work
- Master of Arts in Theological Studies or Christian Ministry
- Master of Business Administration
- Master of Peacebuilding and Collaborative Development

=== Schools and colleges ===
- Canadian School of Peacebuilding
- Community School of Music & the Arts
- Menno Simons College
- Outtatown School of Discipleship
- Redekop School of Business

== Sports ==
The university is represented by the CMU Blazers in soccer, volleyball and basketball. Teams play in the Manitoba Colleges Athletic Conference (formerly the Central Plains Athletic Conference).

== Notable alumni ==
- Di Brandt – poet
- Howard Dyck – conductor and radio broadcaster
- Dave Epp – Member of Parliament
- Scott Gillingham – mayor of Winnipeg
- Beth Goobie – Canadian poet and writer
- Jan Guenther Braun – writer
- Chris Huebner – theologian
- Sarah Klassen – Canadian author
- Royden Loewen – historian
- Leonard Ratzlaff – choral conductor
- A. James Reimer – theologian
- Katie Funk Wiebe – writer
- Rudy Wiebe – writer

== See also ==
- General Conference Mennonite Church
- Mennonite Church Canada
- Mennonite Brethren Church
- List of universities in Manitoba
- Higher education in Manitoba
- Education in Canada
