= Red River College Polytechnic =

College in Manitoba, Canada

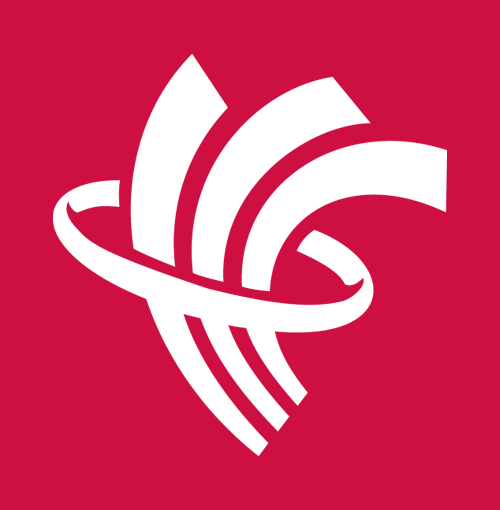
- Other name: RRC Polytech
- Former names: Industrial Vocational Education Centre; Red River Community College; Red River College of Applied Arts, Science, and Technology
- Type: Public
- Established: 1938
- Chair: Loren Cisyk
- President: Fred Meier
- Students: 21,000
- Location: Winnipeg, Manitoba, Canada; 49°55′06″N 97°12′39″W
- Campus: Urban
- Colours: Red and black
- Nickname: RRC Rebels
- Sporting affiliations: CICan; CCAA; Campus Manitoba; CBIE; CUP
- Website: Official website

Red River College Polytechnic (RRC Polytech) is a college located in Winnipeg, Manitoba, Canada. It is the province's largest institute of applied learning and applied research, with over 200 degree, diploma, and certificate programs, and more than 21,000 students annually.

Between 6,000 and 8,000 students attend daily, as well as students registered in continuing and distance education programs. RRC Polytech hosts approximately 1500 international students each year, from over 60 countries.

It has over 200 full-time programs in such areas as biotechnology, construction trades, digital multimedia, business, aerospace, nursing, engineering technology, as well as others.

RRC Polytech offers one year certificate, two- and three-year diploma, joint-degree and post-graduate advanced diploma programs. English as an Additional Language programs for international students begin each month. The college also offers three Kids Technology Camps throughout the year to introduce kids to technology. "Girls Exploring Trades & Technologies Camp" is a program for girls 12 to 14, "Technology Exploration Camp" is a summer camp program for girls and boys aged 11 to 13, and "Saturday Kids Kamps" introduces Grade 7 students to Electrical Engineering Technology.

== History ==
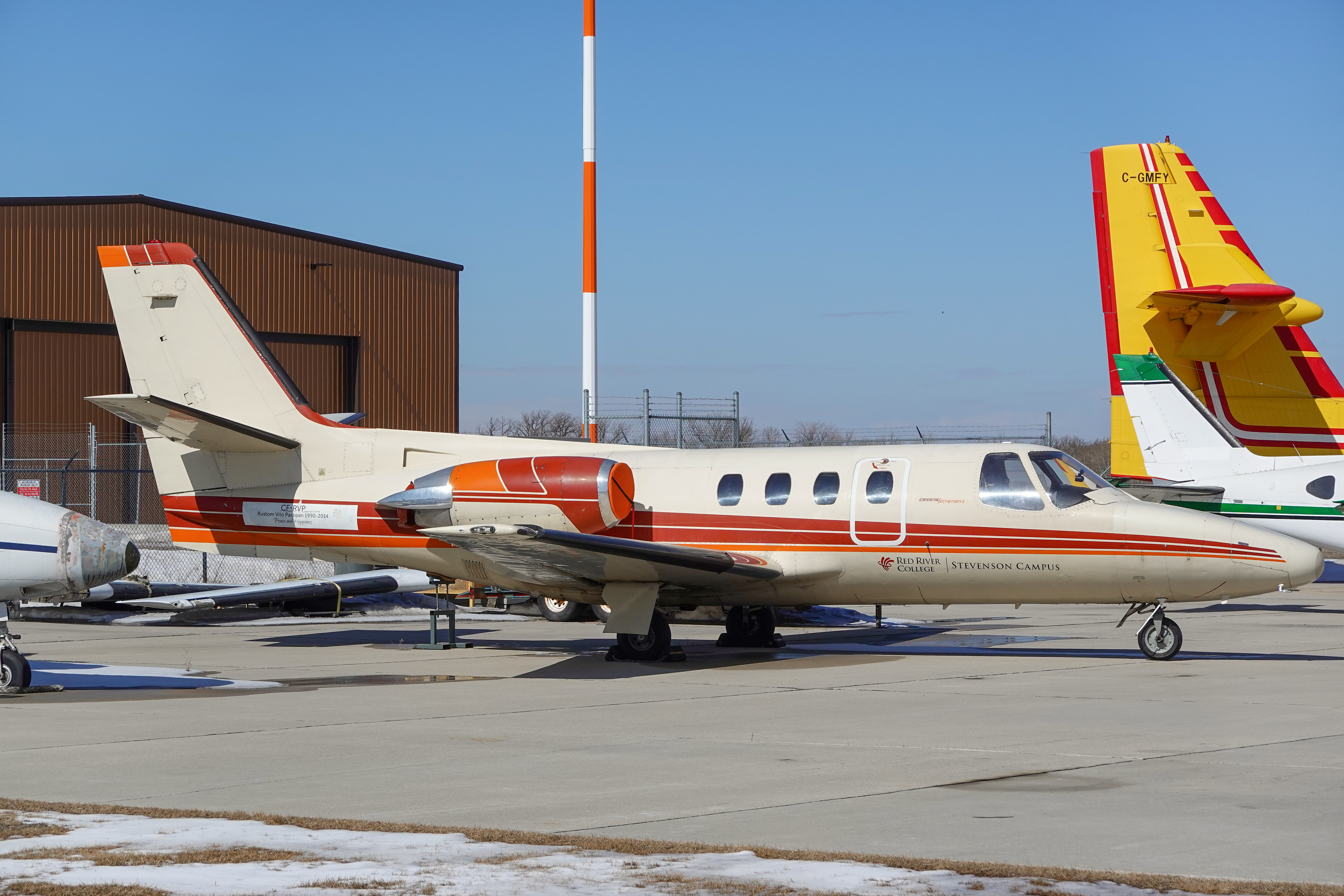
Aircraft donated to the Stevenson Campus for Aviation & Aerospace

The College’s origins are traced back to the Industrial Vocational Training School which opened on October 9, 1938, with a handful of courses and 450 students. It was established to provide vocational training to unskilled and unemployed youth during the Great Depression.

In 1942, the school moved to a larger facility in a former Ford Motor Company assembly plant to accommodate its growing enrollment, especially as it began offering technical training to servicemen during World War II. In 1948, it changed its name becoming the Manitoba Technical Institute.

In 1963, the Notre Dame campus was built and the college name was changed to the Manitoba Institute of Technology (MIT). Half the campus was an arts and science complex, operating under the separate name Manitoba Institute of Applied Arts (MIAA). The two halves consolidated to a single name: Red River Community College (RRCC) in 1969. In 1998, it was renamed to "Red River College of Applied Arts, Science, and Technology", or Red River College.

In 2004, the Princess Street Campus was built in Downtown Winnipeg, with a large focus on multimedia design, computer technology, and the popular Creative Communications program, which prepares students for careers in advertising, journalism, media production, and public relations.

In 2011, the Princess Street Campus was renamed to the Roblin Centre in honour of former Manitoba Premier Duff Roblin. The Roblin Centre, together with the Paterson GlobalFoods Institute is now known as the Exchange District Campus.

On July 4, 2012, the college discontinued over the air broadcasting of student radio station 92.9 Kick FM after nearly 10 years of broadcasting, due to a campus radio policy change by the Canadian Radio-television and Telecommunications Commission (CRTC).

In 2021, the school rebranded from Red River College to Red River College Polytechnic, in line with plans to modernize apprenticeships and expand into applied research and hands-on learning. That same year the Exchange District Campus was expanded with the completion of the Manitou a bi Bii daziigae innovation centre.

In 2022, the Manitoba government pledged to invest more than CA$12 million in funding for a new interdisciplinary health and community services simulation centre at the Notre Dame Campus in Winnipeg, to be called the Health Sciences and Community Services Simulation Centre. The facility was expected to be completed within two years, and is expected to support 115 new post-secondary nursing seats. The new centre will span 16,630 square feet (1,545 m^{2}) and will house a triage station, hospital ward, high-fidelity healthcare simulation room, phlebotomy laboratory, apartment, and exam room for experiential learning, plus academic classrooms and office space.

== Campuses ==
=== Campus locations ===
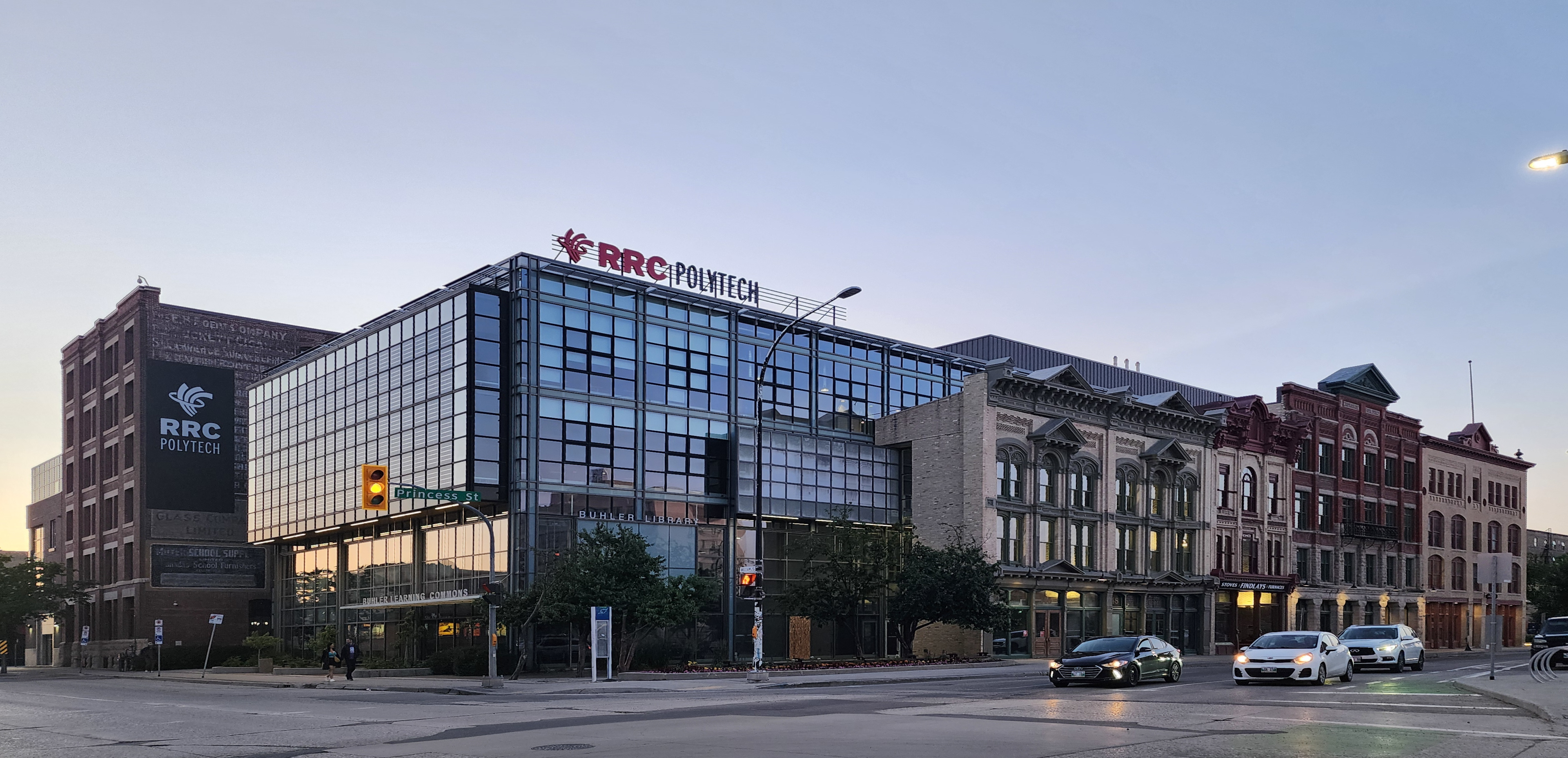
Roblin Centre building in the Exchange District Campus

- Notre Dame Campus, Winnipeg
- Exchange District Campus, Winnipeg
- Stevenson Campus Winnipeg, Winnipeg
- Stevenson Campus Southport, Southport
- Interlake Campus, Selkirk
- Peguis-Fisher River Campus, Peguis
- Portage Campus, Portage la Prairie
- Steinbach Campus, Steinbach
- Winkler Campus, Winkler
- Language Training Centre, Winnipeg

=== Notre Dame Campus ===
Located near the intersection of Notre Dame Avenue and King Edward Street (Route 90), the Notre Dame Campus features fitness facilities with cardio, weight equipment, shower facilities, cardio and yoga classes, playing fields and running paths. The campus also has a Print Shoppe, library and student parking lots as well as cafeterias.

The RRC Polytech Students' Association (RRCSA) operates a convenience store at the Notre Dame Campus called "The Ox".

=== Exchange District Campus ===
==== Roblin Centre ====
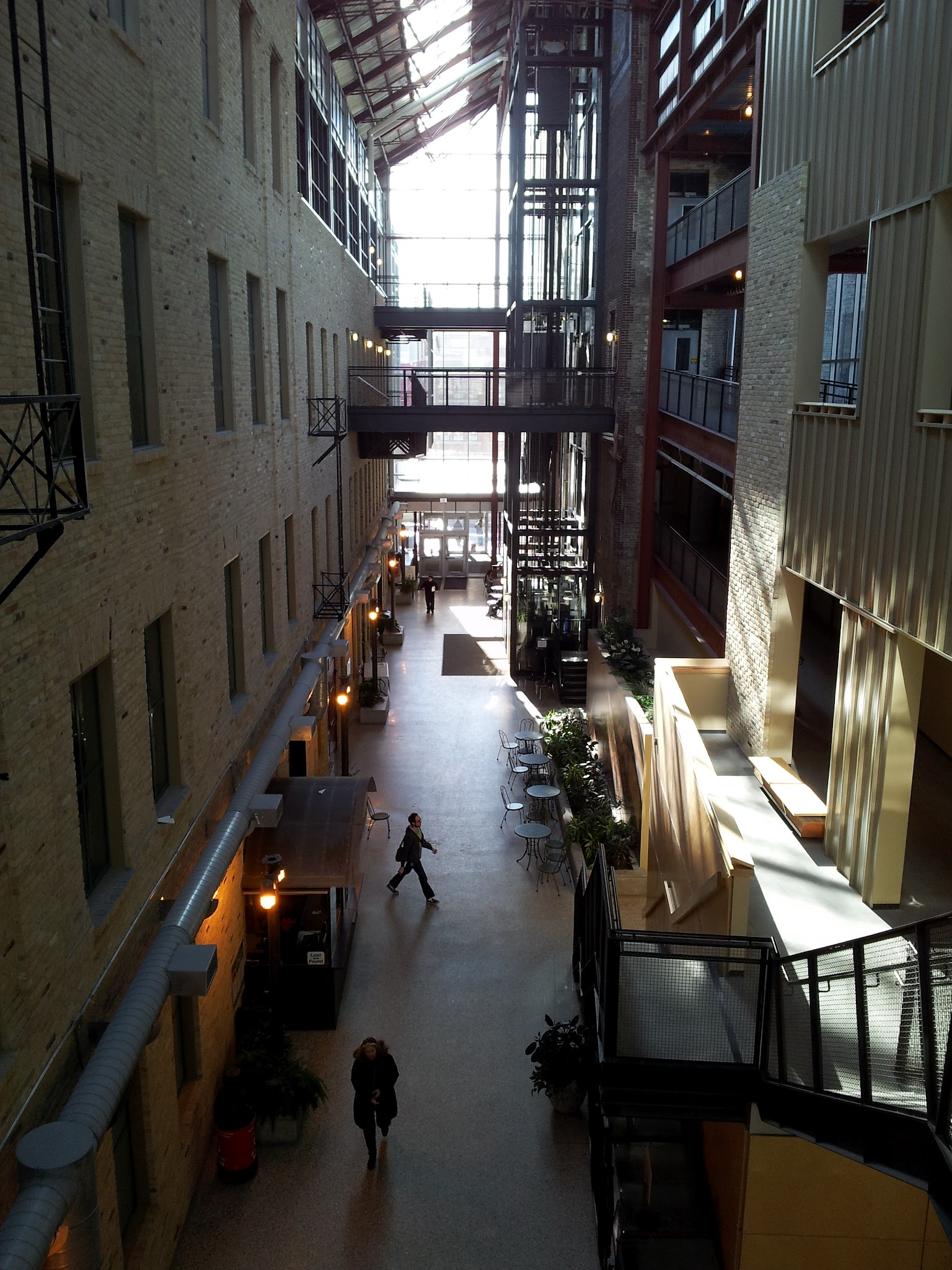
Red River College's Roblin Centre atrium

Located at 160 Princess Street in Winnipeg's Exchange District, the Roblin Centre (formerly known as the Princess Street Campus) is home to approximately 200 staff and 2,000 students. The Centre has a focus on modern media, information technology, and business.

The 220,000-square-foot (20,000 m^{2}) building features the original façades along Princess Street, and incorporates modern green building technology. The Roblin Centre's construction merged five prominent heritage buildings on Princess Street as well as a 1905 warehouse on William Avenue. The merging of these buildings incorporates a former lane into the current Atrium. Many of the architectural features of the original buildings, such as wood columns, floors, brickwork, millwork, and windows were restored and incorporated into the new structure.

The Roblin Centre has a building energy management system and is the largest C-2000* building in Canada. The Centre was completed before the advent of LEED Certification in Canada, but the environmental performance of this project would put it at the level of LEED Gold or Platinum. The Centre was the largest Canadian project to date involving extensive material re-use, and incorporates a 34 kW building-integrated photovoltaic system which was the largest of its kind at the time of installation.

The Roblin Centre features fitness facilities, Campus Store, a library and a full-service Tim Hortons.

Similar to "The Ox" at the Notre Dame Campus, the RRCSA operated a convenience store at the Roblin Centre called "The Mercantile". The store closed in 2019 and was not re-opened the following year on account of the COVID-19 pandemic and as of Oct 2022, had not re-opened.

==== Paterson GlobalFoods Institute ====
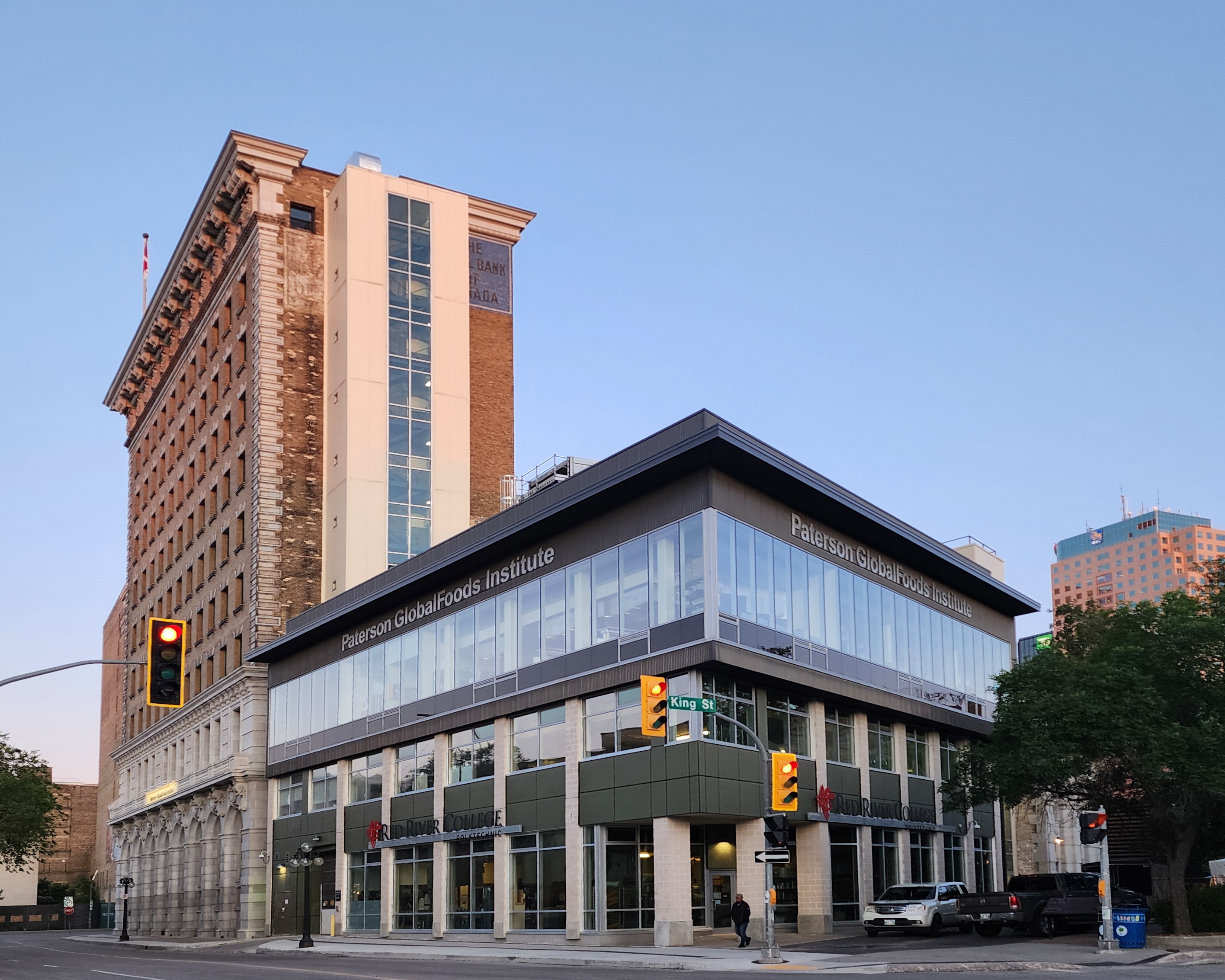
Paterson GlobalFoods Institute

The Paterson GlobalFoods Institute is the home of the Culinary Arts, Hospitality and Tourism Management and Professional Baking and Patisserie programs. Located in the Exchange District, the Institute was completed in January 2013.

In May 2009, the Government of Canada pledged the college with $9.5-million of funding to help reconstruct the Union Bank Building at the corner of Main Street and William Avenue in downtown Winnipeg. The Manitoba government also announced it would contribute $5-million for the construction of the building.

The Institute is located in the Union Bank Building in Winnipeg's Exchange District, an 11-storey building that dates back to 1903. The 100,000-square-foot (9,300 m^{2}) institute provides classroom and kitchen space and two restaurants on the first three floors, as well as residence for 103 students on the floors above. The renovation is expected to cost $34 million, up from the initial $27 million estimate, and involved the addition of two new glass fronted structures adjacent to the existing Union Bank Building. The new adjacent structures were required for the project, as the tower itself could not house the necessary heating and cooling systems. The Union Bank Tower is the last skyscraper of this vintage remaining in Canada, and had been sitting vacant since 1992.

==== Manitou a bi Bii daziigae ====
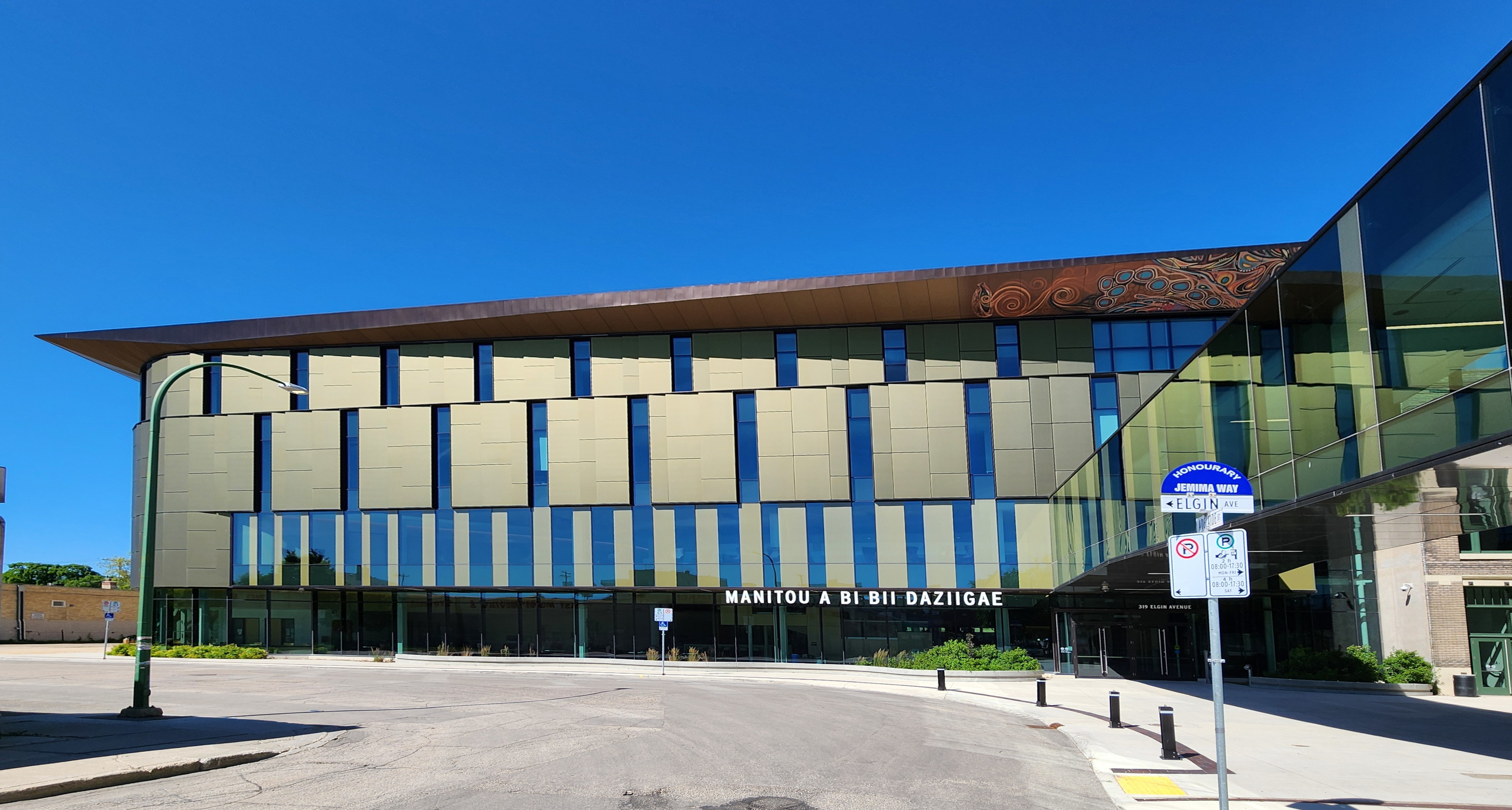
Manitou a bi Bii daziigae

Manitou a bi Bii daziigae is a building in the Exchange District campus, with 18 classrooms and five labs. The building's name is in Anishinaabemowin (Ojibwe) and translates to Where Creator sits (Manitou a bi) and Brings light (Bii daziigae). Construction for the 100,000 sqft facility began in 2018 and completed in 2021, with a cost of $95 million.

== Scholarships & bursaries ==
The Government of Canada sponsors an Aboriginal Bursaries Search Tool that lists over 680 scholarships, bursaries, and other incentives offered by governments, universities, and industry to support Aboriginal post-secondary participation.

RRC Polytech scholarships for Aboriginal, First Nations and Métis students include:

- Manitoba Hydro Electrical Technology Scholarship
- Hannah (Nancy) Boon Bursary
- "Our Children, Our Ways" Distance Education Award
- West Region Child and Family Services Residential Care Unit Award
- Project Neecheewan Award
- Technical Communication Faculty Scholarship
- Pitblado LLP Legal Administrative Assistant Awards
- Employment Equity Education Awards

== Student life ==
=== Athletics ===
Until 2022, RRC Polytech's Rebels Athletics had the following groups:

- Men's Volleyball
- Men's Basketball
- Men's Soccer
- Men's Futsal
- Women's Volleyball
- Women's Basketball
- Women's Soccer
- Women's Futsal

The men's and women's volleyball, basketball and soccer teams competed in the Manitoba Colleges Athletic Conference (MCAC).

The school announced January 13, 2022, that it would be eliminating the Rebels athletic program. The varsity sports teams at RRC Polytech competed for over 50 years prior to being cut.

=== Newspaper ===
The official newspaper of RRC Polytech is "The Projector", which is published by the RRC Polytech Students’ Association every second Monday. The Projector has been the official RRC Polytech student newspaper since 1967.

=== Restaurants ===
Until December 2012, Red River College students operated "Prairie Lights", a fine dining restaurant at the Notre Dame Campus. The restaurant featured full service lunch and dinner menus from September to November and March to May. The evening program featured flambé service and was licensed for alcohol service. The restaurant provided practical experience to the students of the Culinary Arts and Hospitality Management programs, and also functioned as a catering room for the Food Services Department for private functions. The restaurant was open to the public. In December 2012, the restaurant closed, with plans to move the program to Jane's, a fine dining restaurant at the Paterson GlobalFoods Institute.

The restaurants in the Paterson GlobalFoods Institute opened to the public in early 2013. The Culinary Exchange café opened on 15 January 2013, and Jane's opened 21 February 2013.

=== Radio station ===
Students in RRC Polytech's Creative Communications program run an online radio station known as "Red River Radio". The radio station is an opportunity for students to host, program and produce both music and news/talk format radio, and features music and talk shows, as well as news, sports, and weather.

Launched on August 24, 2012, the online radio station replaces the over-the-air local radio station formerly run by the College, 92.9 Kick FM. The online station follows similar format to the discontinued broadcast station, with 24-hour programming and a focus on local indie rock and folk bands.

=== Directions conference ===
RRC Polytech operates a yearly Business and Applied Arts conference called "Directions". The conference promotes networking between current students and potential employers, and promotes career areas such as Business Administration, Indigenous Education, Continuing Education as well as Hospitality and Tourism.

== Notable alumni ==
- Janet Arnott, curler (Business Administration)
- Randy Bachman, guitarist (Business Administration) - did not graduate
- David Bergen, novelist (Creative Communications)
- Rod Black, sports commentator for CTV Sports and TSN (Creative Communications)
- Myrna Driedger, politician (Nursing)
- Krista Erickson, journalist (Creative Communications)
- Dawna Friesen, journalist (Creative Communications)
- Pablo Hidalgo, author and creative executive for Lucasfilm (Creative Communications)
- Chris Jericho, professional wrestler (Creative Communications)
- Andrea Slobodian, journalist (Creative Communications)
- Lloyd Longfield, politician (Mechanical Engineering)
- Holly Nelson, politician (Creative Communications)
- Sheila North, journalist (Creative Communications)
- Ed Mandrake, politician (Automotive Technician)
- John Plohman, politician (Applied Arts)
- Peter Sawatzky, sculptor (Commercial Art)
- Bernadette Smith, politician (Child and Youth Care)
- Adam Smoluk, writer and director (Human Resource Management)

== See also ==
- List of universities in Manitoba
- Higher education in Manitoba
- Education in Canada
