= 2024 CCAA/Curling Canada College Curling Championships =

2024 CCAA/Curling Canada College Championships
- Host city: Fredericton, New Brunswick
- Arena: Aitken University Centre & Capital Winter Club
- Dates: March 12–16
- Men's winner: (Ontario) Humber Hawks
- Skip: Jacob Dobson
- Third: Kevin Genjaga
- Second: Noah Garner
- Lead: Matthew Abrams
- Alternate: Matthew Moretto
- Finalist: (Ontario) Mohawk Mountaineers (Jones)
- Women's winner: (Alberta) Concordia Thunder
- Skip: Gabrielle Wood
- Third: Payton Sonnenberg
- Second: Brenna Bilassy
- Lead: Rachel Jost
- Finalist: (Alberta) SAIT Trojans (Shannon)

The 2024 CCAA/Curling Canada College Championships was held from March 12 to 16 at the Aitken University Centre and the Capital Winter Club in Fredericton, New Brunswick. The event was hosted by the University of New Brunswick. The event was also held in conjunction with the 2024 U Sports/Curling Canada University Curling Championships, the Canadian university curling championship.

== Men ==
=== Teams ===
The teams are listed as follows:

Team	Skip	Third	Second	Lead	Alternate	College
Assiniboine Cougars	Brendan Chubaty	Avery Smart	Ryder Chetyrbuk	Mateo Otto		(Manitoba) Assiniboine Community College
Concordia Thunder	Sean Borkovic	Matthew Wasylenko	Anthony Ogg	James McCabe		(Alberta) Concordia University of Edmonton
Humber Hawks	Jacob Dobson	Kevin Genjaga	Noah Garner	Matthew Abrams	Matthew Moretto	(Ontario) Humber College
Mohawk Mountaineers	Jacob Jones	Eric Just	Joel Matthews	Liam Little	Duncan McDonald	(Ontario) Mohawk College
NAIT Ooks	Cole Rivard	Chase Lozinsky	Matthew Hannah	Tyler Brodt	Nicolas Oake	Northern Alberta Institute of Technology
Red Deer Polytechnic Kings	Jaden Morlock	Nicholas Woznesensky	Samuel Goodey	Aiden Berube		(Alberta) Red Deer Polytechnic
SAIT Trojans	David Baum	Michael Sharp	Nick Mitsopoulos	Justin Reay	Jacob Shea	Southern Alberta Institute of Technology
Sault Cougars	Jake Reid (Fourth)	Connor Simms (Skip)	Evan Robert	Ben Appleton	Avery Berry	(Ontario) Sault College

=== Round robin standings ===
Final Round Robin Standings

Key
Teams to Playoffs

Team	Skip	W	L	PF	PA	EW	EL	BE	SE
(Ontario) Mohawk Mountaineers	Jacob Jones	6	1	60	27	34	22	2	13
(Ontario) Humber Hawks	Jacob Dobson	6	1	57	37	33	27	1	9
(Alberta) SAIT Trojans	David Baum	5	2	43	40	27	28	6	7
(Alberta) NAIT Ooks	Cole Rivard	4	3	51	43	31	25	6	9
(Alberta) Red Deer Polytechnic Kings	Jaden Morlock	3	4	45	49	25	29	3	3
(Ontario) Sault Cougars	Connor Simms	3	4	52	45	27	27	2	8
(Alberta) Concordia Thunder	Sean Borkovic	1	6	36	52	25	25	2	4
(Manitoba) Assiniboine Cougars	Brendan Chubaty	0	7	17	68	17	36	3	2

Round Robin Summary Table
Pos.	Team	(Manitoba) ACC	(Alberta) CON	(Ontario) HUM	(Ontario) MOH	(Alberta) NAIT	(Alberta) RDP	(Alberta) SAIT	(Ontario) SAU	Record
8	(Manitoba) Assiniboine Cougars	—	2–11	3–11	1–8	2–9	4–9	3–7	2–13	0–7
7	(Alberta) Concordia Thunder	11–2	—	4–8	3–10	4–7	6–8	6–8	2–9	1–6
2	(Ontario) Humber Hawks	11–3	8–4	—	4–8	8–6	9–8	8–4	9–4	6–1
1	(Ontario) Mohawk Mountaineers	8–1	10–3	8–4	—	13–5	9–3	4–6	8–5	6–1
4	(Alberta) NAIT Ooks	9–2	7–4	6–8	5–13	—	10–5	9–3	5–8	4–3
5	(Alberta) Red Deer Polytechnic Kings	9–4	8–6	8–9	3–9	5–10	—	3–5	9–6	3–4
3	(Alberta) SAIT Trojans	7–3	8–6	4–8	6–4	3–9	5–3	—	10–7	5–2
6	(Ontario) Sault Cougars	13–2	9–2	4–9	5–8	8–5	6–9	7–10	—	3–4

=== Round robin results ===
All draws are listed in Atlantic Time (UTC−04:00).

==== Draw 2 ====
Tuesday, March 12, 9:00 pm

Sheet A	1	2	3	4	5	6	7	8	9	10	Final
(Ontario) Humber Hawks (Dobson)	0	0	3	1	0	0	3	1	0	1	9
(Alberta) Red Deer Polytechnic Kings (Morlock)	0	5	0	0	1	0	0	0	2	0	8

Sheet C	1	2	3	4	5	6	7	8	9	10	Final
(Ontario) Sault Cougars (Simms)	0	0	0	3	1	0	3	0	0	X	7
(Alberta) SAIT Trojans (Baum)	1	0	2	0	0	3	0	3	1	X	10

Sheet E	1	2	3	4	5	6	7	8	9	10	Final
(Ontario) Mohawk Mountaineers (Jones)	0	2	0	3	0	3	3	2	X	X	13
(Alberta) NAIT Ooks (Rivard)	3	0	1	0	1	0	0	0	X	X	5

Sheet F	1	2	3	4	5	6	7	8	9	10	Final
(Alberta) Concordia Thunder (Borkovic)	2	0	1	0	1	3	4	0	X	X	11
(Manitoba) Assiniboine Cougars (Chubaty)	0	1	0	1	0	0	0	0	X	X	2

==== Draw 4 ====
Wednesday, March 13, 12:30 pm

Sheet A	1	2	3	4	5	6	7	8	9	10	Final
(Ontario) Sault Cougars (Simms)	1	0	1	0	1	0	2	0	0	X	5
(Ontario) Mohawk Mountaineers (Jones)	0	2	0	2	0	1	0	2	1	X	8

Sheet D	1	2	3	4	5	6	7	8	9	10	Final
(Manitoba) Assiniboine Cougars (Chubaty)	0	1	0	1	0	1	0	1	0	X	4
(Alberta) Red Deer Polytechnic Kings (Morlock)	3	0	1	0	1	0	2	0	2	X	9

Sheet F	1	2	3	4	5	6	7	8	9	10	Final
(Alberta) SAIT Trojans (Baum)	1	0	2	0	0	0	0	0	X	X	3
(Alberta) NAIT Ooks (Rivard)	0	1	0	2	2	2	1	1	X	X	9

Sheet H	1	2	3	4	5	6	7	8	9	10	Final
(Alberta) Concordia Thunder (Borkovic)	1	0	1	0	1	0	0	1	X	X	4
(Ontario) Humber Hawks (Dobson)	0	4	0	1	0	2	1	0	X	X	8

==== Draw 6 ====
Wednesday, March 13, 8:30 pm

Sheet B	1	2	3	4	5	6	7	8	9	10	Final
(Alberta) Red Deer Polytechnic Kings (Morlock)	1	0	1	0	0	1	0	0	X	X	3
(Ontario) Mohawk Mountaineers (Jones)	0	1	0	1	1	0	5	1	X	X	9

Sheet D	1	2	3	4	5	6	7	8	9	10	Final
(Alberta) NAIT Ooks (Rivard)	0	3	0	0	1	0	0	1	0	1	6
(Ontario) Humber Hawks (Dobson)	1	0	1	2	0	1	1	0	2	0	8

Sheet E	1	2	3	4	5	6	7	8	9	10	Final
(Manitoba) Assiniboine Cougars (Chubaty)	0	0	1	0	0	1	0	X	X	X	2
(Ontario) Sault Cougars (Simms)	2	2	0	4	4	0	1	X	X	X	13

Sheet G	1	2	3	4	5	6	7	8	9	10	Final
(Alberta) SAIT Trojans (Baum)	1	0	3	0	1	2	0	1	0	X	8
(Alberta) Concordia Thunder (Borkovic)	0	3	0	1	0	0	1	0	1	X	6

==== Draw 8 ====
Thursday, March 14, 12:30 pm

Sheet B	1	2	3	4	5	6	7	8	9	10	Final
(Ontario) Humber Hawks (Dobson)	0	2	0	2	0	0	2	0	3	X	9
(Ontario) Sault Cougars (Simms)	1	0	1	0	0	1	0	1	0	X	4

Sheet C	1	2	3	4	5	6	7	8	9	10	Final
(Ontario) Mohawk Mountaineers (Jones)	3	2	0	1	0	3	1	0	X	X	10
(Alberta) Concordia Thunder (Borkovic)	0	0	1	0	1	0	0	1	X	X	3

Sheet G	1	2	3	4	5	6	7	8	9	10	Final
(Alberta) NAIT Ooks (Rivard)	2	1	0	2	1	0	2	1	X	X	9
(Manitoba) Assiniboine Cougars (Chubaty)	0	0	1	0	0	1	0	0	X	X	2

Sheet H	1	2	3	4	5	6	7	8	9	10	Final
(Alberta) Red Deer Polytechnic Kings (Morlock)	0	0	0	0	0	1	1	0	1	X	3
(Alberta) SAIT Trojans (Baum)	0	0	0	0	2	0	0	3	0	X	5

==== Draw 10 ====
Thursday, March 14, 8:30 pm

Sheet A	1	2	3	4	5	6	7	8	9	10	Final
(Alberta) Concordia Thunder (Borkovic)	0	0	1	0	0	2	0	0	1	X	4
(Alberta) NAIT Ooks (Rivard)	2	0	0	0	2	0	0	3	0	X	7

Sheet B	1	2	3	4	5	6	7	8	9	10	Final
(Manitoba) Assiniboine Cougars (Chubaty)	1	1	0	0	0	0	1	0	0	X	3
(Alberta) SAIT Trojans (Baum)	0	0	1	1	1	3	0	1	0	X	7

Sheet F	1	2	3	4	5	6	7	8	9	10	Final
(Ontario) Sault Cougars (Simms)	0	2	0	0	1	0	2	1	0	X	6
(Alberta) Red Deer Polytechnic Kings (Morlock)	1	0	2	1	0	2	0	0	3	X	9

Sheet G	1	2	3	4	5	6	7	8	9	10	Final
(Ontario) Mohawk Mountaineers (Jones)	0	1	0	0	3	0	1	0	2	1	8
(Ontario) Humber Hawks (Dobson)	1	0	1	0	0	1	0	1	0	0	4

==== Draw 11 ====
Friday, March 15, 8:30 am

Sheet C	1	2	3	4	5	6	7	8	9	10	Final
(Alberta) Red Deer Polytechnic Kings (Morlock)	3	0	0	1	0	0	1	0	0	X	5
(Alberta) NAIT Ooks (Rivard)	0	0	2	0	2	1	0	4	1	X	10

Sheet D	1	2	3	4	5	6	7	8	9	10	Final
(Ontario) Sault Cougars (Simms)	2	2	0	5	0	0	X	X	X	X	9
(Alberta) Concordia Thunder (Borkovic)	0	0	0	0	1	1	X	X	X	X	2

Sheet E	1	2	3	4	5	6	7	8	9	10	Final
(Alberta) SAIT Trojans (Baum)	1	0	1	0	1	0	1	0	0	X	4
(Ontario) Humber Hawks (Dobson)	0	4	0	1	0	1	0	1	1	X	8

Sheet H	1	2	3	4	5	6	7	8	9	10	Final
(Manitoba) Assiniboine Cougars (Chubaty)	0	0	0	1	0	0	0	0	X	X	1
(Ontario) Mohawk Mountaineers (Jones)	0	2	0	0	2	1	1	2	X	X	8

==== Draw 13 ====
Friday, March 15, 4:30 pm

Sheet C	1	2	3	4	5	6	7	8	9	10	Final
(Ontario) Humber Hawks (Dobson)	2	0	1	1	0	0	5	2	X	X	11
(Manitoba) Assiniboine Cougars (Chubaty)	0	1	0	0	1	1	0	0	X	X	3

Sheet D	1	2	3	4	5	6	7	8	9	10	Final
(Alberta) SAIT Trojans (Baum)	0	0	0	2	0	2	0	0	1	1	6
(Ontario) Mohawk Mountaineers (Jones)	0	0	1	0	1	0	1	1	0	0	4

Sheet E	1	2	3	4	5	6	7	8	9	10	Final
(Alberta) Red Deer Polytechnic Kings (Morlock)	0	2	0	3	0	0	0	3	0	X	8
(Alberta) Concordia Thunder (Borkovic)	0	0	2	0	2	0	1	0	1	X	6

Sheet H	1	2	3	4	5	6	7	8	9	10	Final
(Alberta) NAIT Ooks (Rivard)	0	0	1	1	2	0	0	1	0	X	5
(Ontario) Sault Cougars (Simms)	1	0	0	0	0	3	2	0	2	X	8

=== Playoffs ===
Semifinal
1	(Ontario) Mohawk Mountaineers	10
4	(Alberta) NAIT Ooks	3
2	(Ontario) Humber Hawks	10
3	(Alberta) SAIT Trojans	5

Final
1	(Ontario) Mohawk Mountaineers	6
2	(Ontario) Humber Hawks	7
Bronze medal game
4	(Alberta) NAIT Ooks	5
3	(Alberta) SAIT Trojans	8

==== Semifinals ====
Saturday, March 16, 9:30 am

Sheet A	1	2	3	4	5	6	7	8	9	10	Final
(Ontario) Mohawk Mountaineers (Jones)	3	0	1	1	0	3	2	0	X	X	10
(Alberta) NAIT Ooks (Rivard)	0	0	0	0	1	0	0	2	X	X	3

Sheet G	1	2	3	4	5	6	7	8	9	10	Final
(Ontario) Humber Hawks (Dobson)	0	2	1	3	0	0	2	0	2	X	10
(Alberta) SAIT Trojans (Baum)	1	0	0	0	1	1	0	2	0	X	5

==== Bronze medal game ====
Saturday, March 16, 2:30 pm

Sheet F	1	2	3	4	5	6	7	8	9	10	Final
(Alberta) NAIT Ooks (Rivard)	1	0	0	0	2	0	1	0	1	0	5
(Alberta) SAIT Trojans (Baum)	0	1	0	1	0	2	0	1	0	3	8

==== Final ====
Saturday, March 16, 2:30 pm

Sheet B	1	2	3	4	5	6	7	8	9	10	Final
(Ontario) Mohawk Mountaineers (Jones)	1	0	0	0	0	1	2	0	2	0	6
(Ontario) Humber Hawks (Dobson)	0	0	2	1	1	0	0	2	0	1	7

=== Final standings ===
Place	Team
1st place, gold medalist(s)	(Ontario) Humber Hawks
2nd place, silver medalist(s)	(Ontario) Mohawk Mountaineers
3rd place, bronze medalist(s)	(Alberta) SAIT Trojans
4	(Alberta) NAIT Ooks
5	(Alberta) Red Deer Polytechnic Kings
6	(Ontario) Sault Cougars
7	(Alberta) Concordia Thunder
8	(Manitoba) Assiniboine Cougars

== Women ==
=== Teams ===
The teams are listed as follows:

Team	Skip	Third	Second	Lead	Alternate	College
Assiniboine Cougars	Kristen Carlson	Neveah Witherspoon	Ashlie Jewar	Jada Ricard	Robyn Newsome	(Manitoba) Assiniboine Community College
Augustana Vikings	Josie Zimmerman	Claire Bevan-Stewart	Hope Zimmerman	Randi Cameron		(Alberta) Augustana University College
Concordia Thunder	Gabrielle Wood	Payton Sonnenberg	Brenna Bilassy	Rachel Jost		(Alberta) Concordia University of Edmonton
Fanshawe Falcons	Veronica Van Broekhoven	Kara Wrightson	Nicole McClennan	Abigail Brown	Jamie Forrester	(Ontario) Fanshawe College
Humber Hawks	Meaghan Mallett	Parker Doig	Emma Rebel	Krysten Elson	Hailey Brittain	(Ontario) Humber College
Mohawk Mountaineers	Ava Andrews	Natalie Scholtens	Kerri Smith	Olivia Thibodeau		(Ontario) Mohawk College
PACWEST	Sasha Wilson	Alex Ashton	Tayla Ford	Lauren Cochrane		(British Columbia) Pacific Western Athletic Association
SAIT Trojans	Kayleigh Shannon	Bayly Scoffin	Raelyn Helston	Madison Milot	Samantha Atkinson	Southern Alberta Institute of Technology

=== Round robin standings ===
Final Round Robin Standings

Key
Teams to Playoffs

Team	Skip	W	L	PF	PA	EW	EL	BE	SE
(Alberta) SAIT Trojans	Kayleigh Shannon	6	1	69	32	34	24	2	17
(Alberta) Concordia Thunder	Gabrielle Wood	5	2	62	31	34	20	2	14
(Ontario) Humber Hawks	Meaghan Mallett	5	2	66	42	34	24	5	17
(Alberta) Augustana Vikings	Josie Zimmerman	4	3	59	49	28	29	2	14
(British Columbia) PACWEST	Sasha Wilson	3	4	40	46	26	26	4	9
(Ontario) Fanshawe Falcons	Veronica Van Broekhoven	3	4	55	51	30	27	0	13
(Manitoba) Assiniboine Cougars	Kristen Carlson	2	5	31	67	19	38	1	5
(Ontario) Mohawk Mountaineers	Ava Andrews	0	7	25	89	17	34	0	2

Round Robin Summary Table
Pos.	Team	(Manitoba) ACC	(Alberta) AUG	(Alberta) CON	(Ontario) FAN	(Ontario) HUM	(Ontario) MOH	(British Columbia) PAC	(Alberta) SAIT	Record
7	(Manitoba) Assiniboine Cougars	—	3–10	2–9	0–12	7–8	10–9	7–6	2–13	2–5
4	(Alberta) Augustana Vikings	10–3	—	1–9	12–10	7–11	13–2	11–3	5–11	4–3
2	(Alberta) Concordia Thunder	9–2	9–1	—	6–7	8–7	17–1	5–7	8–6	5–2
6	(Ontario) Fanshawe Falcons	12–0	10–12	7–6	—	3–9	13–6	5–9	5–9	3–4
3	(Ontario) Humber Hawks	8–7	11–7	7–8	9–3	—	14–2	10–5	7–10	5–2
8	(Ontario) Mohawk Mountaineers	9–10	2–13	1–17	6–13	2–14	—	1–9	4–13	0–7
5	(British Columbia) PACWEST	6–7	3–11	7–5	9–5	5–10	9–1	—	1–7	3–4
1	(Alberta) SAIT Trojans	13–2	11–5	6–8	9–5	10–7	13–4	7–1	—	6–1

=== Round robin results ===
All draws are listed in Atlantic Time (UTC−04:00).

==== Draw 1 ====
Tuesday, March 12, 4:30 pm

Sheet A	1	2	3	4	5	6	7	8	9	10	Final
(Ontario) Fanshawe Falcons (Van Broekhoven)	0	2	1	1	0	0	4	0	0	2	10
(Alberta) Augustana Vikings (Zimmerman)	3	0	0	0	2	4	0	1	2	0	12

Sheet C	1	2	3	4	5	6	7	8	9	10	Final
(Ontario) Humber Hawks (Mallett)	0	0	1	0	3	0	0	0	3	0	7
(Alberta) Concordia Thunder (Wood)	0	0	0	1	0	4	0	1	0	2	8

Sheet E	1	2	3	4	5	6	7	8	9	10	Final
(Alberta) SAIT Trojans (Shannon)	0	2	0	1	1	0	0	3	X	X	7
(British Columbia) PACWEST (Wilson)	0	0	0	0	0	0	1	0	X	X	1

Sheet F	1	2	3	4	5	6	7	8	9	10	Final
(Manitoba) Assiniboine Cougars (Carlson)	2	0	0	3	0	2	0	3	0	X	10
(Ontario) Mohawk Mountaineers (Andrews)	0	2	1	0	1	0	1	0	4	X	9

==== Draw 3 ====
Wednesday, March 13, 8:30 am

Sheet A	1	2	3	4	5	6	7	8	9	10	Final
(Ontario) Humber Hawks (Mallett)	1	0	1	2	1	0	0	2	0	0	7
(Alberta) SAIT Trojans (Shannon)	0	2	0	0	0	1	2	0	3	2	10

Sheet D	1	2	3	4	5	6	7	8	9	10	Final
(Ontario) Mohawk Mountaineers (Andrews)	0	0	0	1	0	0	1	X	X	X	2
(Alberta) Augustana Vikings (Zimmerman)	1	1	3	0	7	1	0	X	X	X	13

Sheet F	1	2	3	4	5	6	7	8	9	10	Final
(Alberta) Concordia Thunder (Wood)	1	0	0	2	0	1	1	0	0	0	5
(British Columbia) PACWEST (Wilson)	0	1	0	0	3	0	0	0	2	1	7

Sheet H	1	2	3	4	5	6	7	8	9	10	Final
(Manitoba) Assiniboine Cougars (Carlson)	0	0	0	0	0	0	X	X	X	X	0
(Ontario) Fanshawe Falcons (Van Broekhoven)	2	2	3	1	1	3	X	X	X	X	12

==== Draw 5 ====
Wednesday, March 13, 4:30 pm

Sheet B	1	2	3	4	5	6	7	8	9	10	Final
(Alberta) Augustana Vikings (Zimmerman)	0	0	2	1	0	0	0	2	0	X	5
(Alberta) SAIT Trojans (Shannon)	1	4	0	0	1	1	2	0	2	X	11

Sheet D	1	2	3	4	5	6	7	8	9	10	Final
(British Columbia) PACWEST (Wilson)	3	1	0	1	0	2	0	1	1	X	9
(Ontario) Fanshawe Falcons (Van Broekhoven)	0	0	2	0	2	0	1	0	0	X	5

Sheet E	1	2	3	4	5	6	7	8	9	10	Final
(Ontario) Mohawk Mountaineers (Andrews)	0	1	0	0	0	0	1	X	X	X	2
(Ontario) Humber Hawks (Mallett)	1	0	5	3	2	3	0	X	X	X	14

Sheet G	1	2	3	4	5	6	7	8	9	10	Final
(Alberta) Concordia Thunder (Wood)	2	1	2	0	2	0	1	1	X	X	9
(Manitoba) Assiniboine Cougars (Carlson)	0	0	0	1	0	1	0	0	X	X	2

==== Draw 7 ====
Thursday, March 14, 8:30 am

Sheet B	1	2	3	4	5	6	7	8	9	10	Final
(Ontario) Fanshawe Falcons (Van Broekhoven)	0	0	2	0	0	0	0	1	X	X	3
(Ontario) Humber Hawks (Mallett)	2	2	0	0	1	2	2	0	X	X	9

Sheet C	1	2	3	4	5	6	7	8	9	10	Final
(Alberta) SAIT Trojans (Shannon)	4	1	1	0	3	2	2	0	X	X	13
(Manitoba) Assiniboine Cougars (Carlson)	0	0	0	1	0	0	0	1	X	X	2

Sheet G	1	2	3	4	5	6	7	8	9	10	Final
(British Columbia) PACWEST (Wilson)	2	2	1	0	2	1	1	X	X	X	9
(Ontario) Mohawk Mountaineers (Andrews)	0	0	0	1	0	0	0	X	X	X	1

Sheet H	1	2	3	4	5	6	7	8	9	10	Final
(Alberta) Augustana Vikings (Zimmerman)	0	0	0	0	0	0	0	1	0	X	1
(Alberta) Concordia Thunder (Wood)	1	0	0	1	1	1	4	0	1	X	9

==== Draw 9 ====
Thursday, March 14, 4:30 pm

Sheet A	1	2	3	4	5	6	7	8	9	10	Final
(Manitoba) Assiniboine Cougars (Carlson)	0	3	0	0	2	1	0	1	0	0	7
(British Columbia) PACWEST (Wilson)	1	0	3	0	0	0	0	0	1	1	6

Sheet B	1	2	3	4	5	6	7	8	9	10	Final
(Ontario) Mohawk Mountaineers (Andrews)	0	0	0	1	0	X	X	X	X	X	1
(Alberta) Concordia Thunder (Wood)	7	1	6	0	3	X	X	X	X	X	17

Sheet F	1	2	3	4	5	6	7	8	9	10	Final
(Ontario) Humber Hawks (Mallett)	0	1	3	3	0	2	0	0	2	X	11
(Alberta) Augustana Vikings (Zimmerman)	3	0	0	0	1	0	1	2	0	X	7

Sheet G	1	2	3	4	5	6	7	8	9	10	Final
(Alberta) SAIT Trojans (Shannon)	0	3	1	0	0	0	3	2	0	X	9
(Ontario) Fanshawe Falcons (Van Broekhoven)	0	0	0	1	1	2	0	0	1	X	5

==== Draw 12 ====
Friday, March 15, 12:30 pm

Sheet C	1	2	3	4	5	6	7	8	9	10	Final
(Alberta) Augustana Vikings (Zimmerman)	2	0	1	3	0	3	2	X	X	X	11
(British Columbia) PACWEST (Wilson)	0	2	0	0	1	0	0	X	X	X	3

Sheet D	1	2	3	4	5	6	7	8	9	10	Final
(Ontario) Humber Hawks (Mallett)	1	1	1	0	0	0	1	1	0	3	8
(Manitoba) Assiniboine Cougars (Carlson)	0	0	0	3	1	1	0	0	2	0	7

Sheet E	1	2	3	4	5	6	7	8	9	10	Final
(Alberta) Concordia Thunder (Wood)	0	2	0	0	2	0	1	0	1	0	6
(Ontario) Fanshawe Falcons (Van Broekhoven)	0	0	1	2	0	1	0	1	0	2	7

Sheet H	1	2	3	4	5	6	7	8	9	10	Final
(Ontario) Mohawk Mountaineers (Andrews)	0	2	0	1	0	1	0	0	X	X	4
(Alberta) SAIT Trojans (Shannon)	3	0	2	0	5	0	2	1	X	X	13

==== Draw 14 ====
Friday, March 15, 8:30 pm

Sheet C	1	2	3	4	5	6	7	8	9	10	Final
(Ontario) Fanshawe Falcons (Van Broekhoven)	0	1	0	2	3	5	2	0	X	X	13
(Ontario) Mohawk Mountaineers (Andrews)	2	0	2	0	0	0	0	2	X	X	6

Sheet D	1	2	3	4	5	6	7	8	9	10	Final
(Alberta) Concordia Thunder (Wood)	0	0	1	0	2	0	2	1	1	1	8
(Alberta) SAIT Trojans (Shannon)	1	1	0	2	0	2	0	0	0	0	6

Sheet E	1	2	3	4	5	6	7	8	9	10	Final
(Alberta) Augustana Vikings (Zimmerman)	0	2	1	5	0	0	1	1	X	X	10
(Manitoba) Assiniboine Cougars (Carlson)	1	0	0	0	1	1	0	0	X	X	3

Sheet H	1	2	3	4	5	6	7	8	9	10	Final
(British Columbia) PACWEST (Wilson)	1	0	3	0	0	0	0	1	0	X	5
(Ontario) Humber Hawks (Mallett)	0	1	0	0	2	4	1	0	2	X	10

=== Playoffs ===
Semifinal
1	(Alberta) SAIT Trojans	12
4	(Alberta) Augustana Vikings	5
2	(Alberta) Concordia Thunder	7
3	(Ontario) Humber Hawks	4

Final
1	(Alberta) SAIT Trojans	5
2	(Alberta) Concordia Thunder	8
Bronze medal game
4	(Alberta) Augustana Vikings	5
3	(Ontario) Humber Hawks	6

==== Semifinals ====
Saturday, March 16, 9:30 am

Sheet B	1	2	3	4	5	6	7	8	9	10	Final
(Alberta) SAIT Trojans (Shannon)	5	3	0	0	0	3	0	1	X	X	12
(Alberta) Augustana Vikings (Zimmerman)	0	0	1	1	2	0	1	0	X	X	5

Sheet F	1	2	3	4	5	6	7	8	9	10	Final
(Alberta) Concordia Thunder (Wood)	2	0	0	1	0	0	2	0	1	1	7
(Ontario) Humber Hawks (Mallett)	0	1	0	0	1	1	0	1	0	0	4

==== Bronze medal game ====
Saturday, March 16, 2:30 pm

Sheet E	1	2	3	4	5	6	7	8	9	10	Final
(Alberta) Augustana Vikings (Zimmerman)	0	0	1	0	0	0	2	0	1	1	5
(Ontario) Humber Hawks (Mallett)	1	1	0	1	1	0	0	2	0	0	6

==== Final ====
Saturday, March 16, 2:30 pm

Sheet A	1	2	3	4	5	6	7	8	9	10	Final
(Alberta) SAIT Trojans (Shannon)	0	1	0	0	1	1	0	2	0	0	5
(Alberta) Concordia Thunder (Wood)	0	0	2	2	0	0	1	0	1	2	8

=== Final standings ===
Place	Team
1st place, gold medalist(s)	(Alberta) Concordia Thunder
2nd place, silver medalist(s)	(Alberta) SAIT Trojans
3rd place, bronze medalist(s)	(Ontario) Humber Hawks
4	(Alberta) Augustana Vikings
5	(British Columbia) PACWEST
6	(Ontario) Fanshawe Falcons
7	(Manitoba) Assiniboine Cougars
8	(Ontario) Mohawk Mountaineers
