= Assiniboine College =

Community college in Brandon, Manitoba, Canada

Coordinates: 49°50′26″N 99°55′07″W

- Former names: Brandon Vocational Training Centre (1961–1969); Assiniboine Community College (1969–2024)
- Type: Public
- Established: February 1961; 65 years ago
- Affiliations: CICan, CCAA, CBIE, CMB
- President: Mark Frison
- Administrative staff: 500 (full and part-time)
- Students: 4,100 (full-time)
- Location: 1430 Victoria Avenue East Brandon, Manitoba, Canada
- Sports teams: Assiniboine Cougars
- Colours: Purple and red
- Mascot: Caccey the Cougar
- Website: assiniboine.net

Assiniboine College is a public college in Brandon, Manitoba, Canada. Founded in 1961, it is accredited by the Manitoba Council on Post-Secondary Education, which was created by the government of Manitoba.

The Victoria Avenue East and North Hill campuses in Brandon are the main locations. The Parkland Campus, a satellite campus, is located in Dauphin. There are also training campuses located in Winnipeg, Neepawa, Russell, Swan River, and Steinbach.

== History ==
In 1961, Assiniboine College opened as the Brandon Vocational Training Centre. When the school first opened, it consisted of four staff members and offered two courses to 24 students. By 1966, the school had grown to a staff of 24 and offered 11 programs to 300 students.

In 1969, when Manitoba's three technical vocational schools were turned into community colleges, the Brandon Vocational Training Centre was renamed Assiniboine Community College. The college rebranded from Assiniboine Community College to Assiniboine College in the summer of 2024.

== Academics ==
Assiniboine College offers degree, diploma, certificate, apprenticeship, and continuing education programs. The college's educational delivery is offered through various approaches, including face-to-face, distance, integrated programs, and blended learning.

The college offers over 50 programs in the fields of agriculture, environment, business, health and human services, trades, and technology. The enabling legislation for the college is the Colleges Act.

The college's largest program is the practical nursing diploma. In 2007, the practical nursing program was offered in Brandon, Winnipeg, and two rural Manitoba communities. In 2022, additional rural rotating practical nursing sites were added in Otterburne and Morden. In response to the COVID-19 pandemic, the provincial government invested in 55 additional licensed practical nursing seats through Assiniboine in Portage la Prairie and rural rotating sites.

== Campuses ==
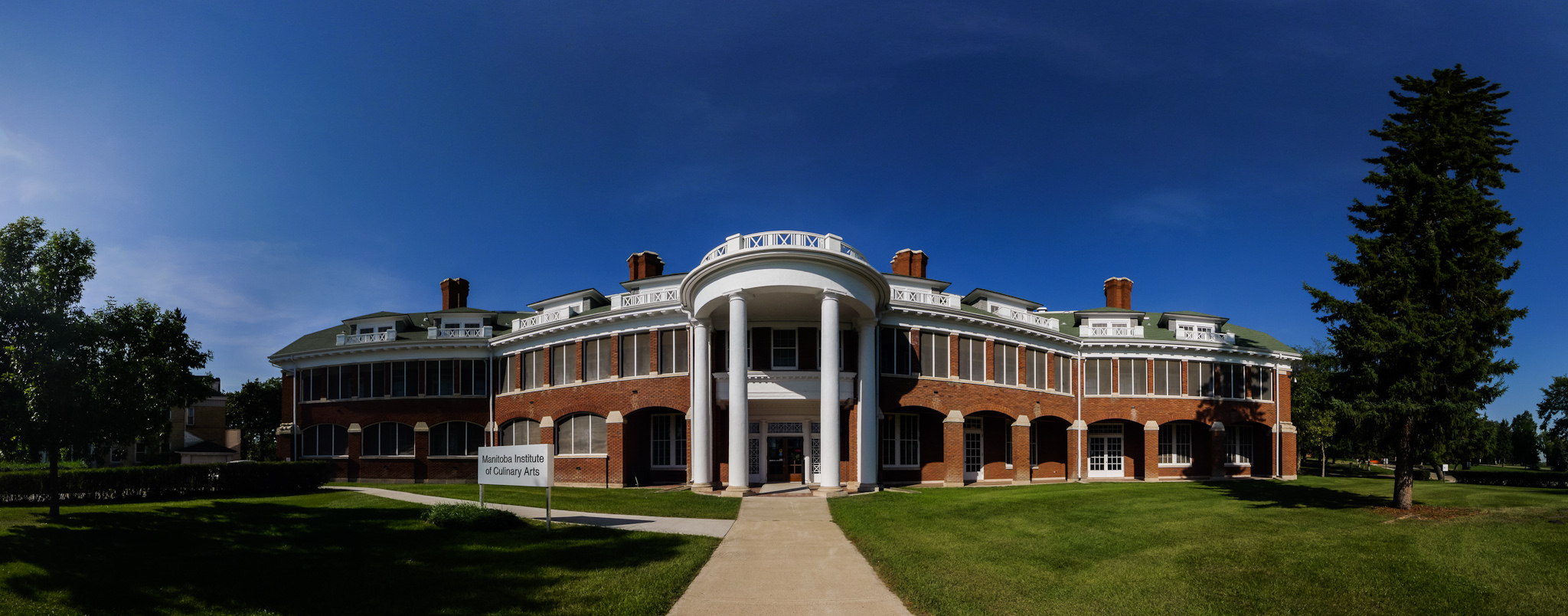
Manitoba Institute of Culinary Arts, built in 1923 as a Nurses' Residence.

There are three campuses throughout Brandon, Manitoba, Canada. Two-thirds of the college's student enrolment study at the Victoria Avenue East Campus, located at 1430 Victoria Avenue East. The Russ Edwards School of Agriculture & Environment, Peters School of Business, and Public Safety Training Centre are located at this campus.

In 1995, the Centre for Adult Learning came into operation in downtown Brandon. It offers adult upgrading for various senior high school courses. The Centre for Adult Learning is located at the Victoria Avenue East campus in Brandon, and the Parkland campus in Dauphin.

The college's North Hill Campus in Brandon is the location of the Manitoba Institute of Culinary Arts, the Len Evans Centre for Trades and Technology, the former Brandon Mental Health Centre, and the college's Sustainable Greenhouse. To consolidate the training capacity in Manitoba's growing agriculture sector, the provincial government invested $120,000,000 to expand the Russ Edwards School of Agriculture & Environment to the North Hill Campus. The construction of the Prairie Innovation Centre for Sustainable Agriculture will expand agriculture-related programming capacity from 300 to more than 800 students.

In addition to its main campuses, Assiniboine College offers programs at its satellite and training sites. The Parkland Campus is located in Dauphin and offers several full-time day programs and a range of evening and off-campus courses. At the Winnipeg Campus, the Practical Nursing program and continuing studies courses are offered.

== Notable alumni ==
- Stephen Downes, philosopher
- Colleen Robbins, politician

== See also ==
- List of agricultural universities and colleges
- List of universities in Manitoba
- Higher education in Manitoba
- Education in Canada
