= University College of the North =

Educational institution in Northern Manitoba, Canada

- Former name: Keewatin Community College (1966-2004)
- Type: University College
- Established: July 1, 2004 as University College of the North; 1966 (as Keewatin Community College)
- Affiliations: CICan, AUCC, Canadian Colleges Athletic Association, Association of Canadian Community Colleges, IAU, CIS, UArctic, ACU, Campus Manitoba
- Chancellor: Edwin Jebb
- President: Doug Lauvstad
- Administrative staff: Approx. 400
- Students: Approx. 2,400
- Location: 436 7th St E Box 3000, The Pas, Manitoba, Canada; 53°49′11″N 101°14′16″W
- Website: www.ucn.ca

University College of the North (UCN)—formerly Keewatin Community College—is a post-secondary institution located in Northern Manitoba, Canada, with two main campuses in The Pas and Thompson. UCN has a student body of approximately 2,400 annually and a staff of approximately 400.

== History ==
Northern Manitoba Vocational Center, later named Keewatin Community College, was established in The Pas, Manitoba, in 1966. The school would go on to open a campus in Thompson in the early 1980s.

On July 1, 2004, University College of the North was established with the passage of the University of the North Act in the Legislative Assembly of Manitoba, as the successor to Keewatin Community College.

== Locations ==
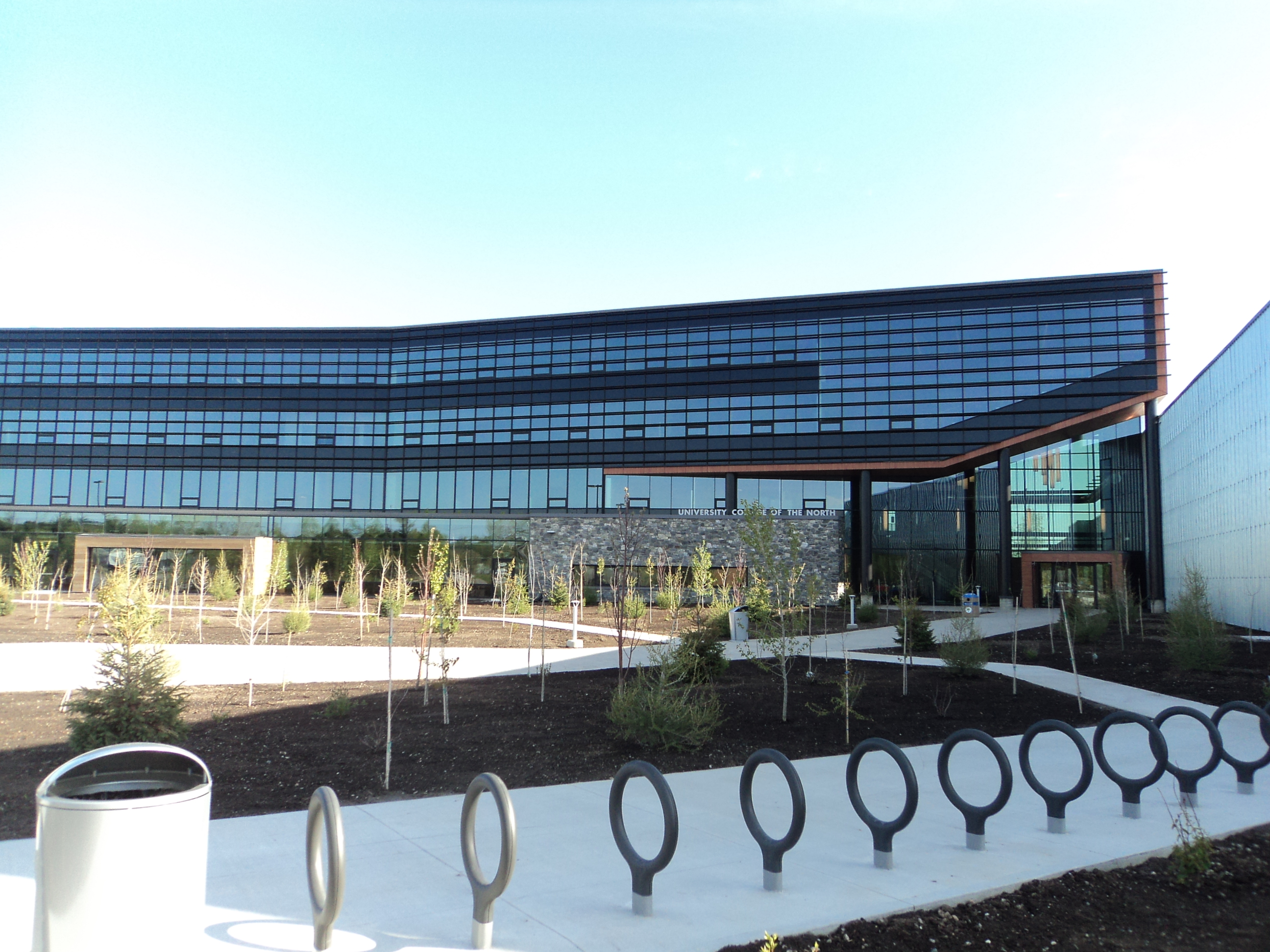
June 2014 UCN Thompson

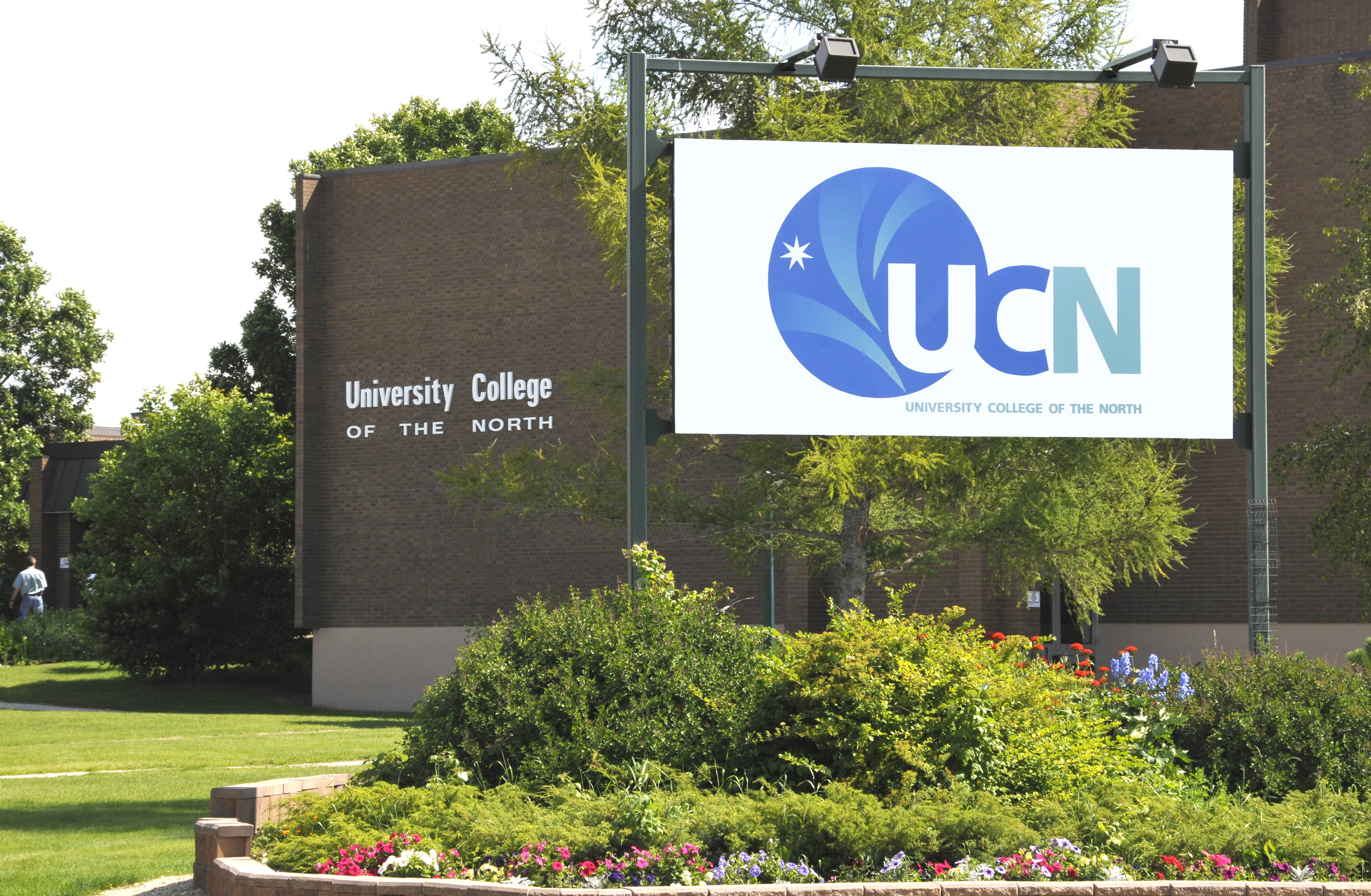
University College of the North's The Pas campus.

UCN has two main campuses, in The Pas and Thompson. There are 12 regional centres, 9 of which are in First Nations communities: Churchill, Cross Lake (Pimicikamak), Easterville (Chemawawin), Flin Flon, Pukatawagan (Mathias Colomb), Grand Rapids (Misipawistik), Nelson House (Nisichawayasihk), Norway House, Oxford House (Bunibonibee), St. Theresa Point, Split Lake (Tataskweyak), and Swan River. In partnership with local Cree Nation authorities, UCN co-sponsors public libraries in Pukatawagan, Norway House, and Chemawawin.

In total, the area served by UCN covers an area roughly equal to the size of France. Set into the Canadian Shield and surrounded by boreal forest, the campus at The Pas is near Clearwater Lake Provincial Park.

== Programs ==
UCN offers more than 40 degree, diploma, and certificate programs in the Faculty of Arts and Science, Faculty of Trades and Technology, Faculty of Health, Faculty of Education, Faculty of Business, and as part of community-based contract training and Apprenticeship training.

The college is an active member of the University of the Arctic. UArctic is an international cooperative network based in the Circumpolar Arctic region, consisting of more than 200 universities, colleges, and other organizations with an interest in promoting education and research in the Arctic region.

=== Scholarships and bursaries ===
The Government of Canada sponsors an Aboriginal Bursaries Search Tool that lists over 680 scholarships, bursaries, and other incentives offered by governments, universities, and industry to support Aboriginal post-secondary participation. University College of the North scholarships for Aboriginal, First Nations and Métis students include: Manitoba Hydro Second Year to Final Year Engineering Technology Bursary

== Aboriginal ==
The UCN Council of Elders provides guidance through the sharing of traditional knowledge, beliefs and values. There are Aboriginal Centres at UCN's two main campuses. The Mamawechetotan Centre in The Pas and ininiwi kiskinwamakewin Centre in Thompson offer programs that promote cross-cultural awareness. There is a great deal of diversity that is well respected.

Carol Couchie helped to establish an Aboriginal Midwifery Education Program at the University College of the North.

== See also ==
- Education in Canada
- List of universities in the Canadian Prairies
- Higher education in Manitoba
