= Chris Huebner =

Theologian

- Born: Christopher Kennedy Huebner; 1969 (age 56–57); Winnipeg, Manitoba, Canada

Academic background
- Education: Canadian Mennonite Bible College; University of Manitoba; Duke University
- Thesis: Unhandling History (2002)

Academic work
- Discipline: Theology; philosophy
- Sub-discipline: Philosophical theology; ethics; political theology
- Institutions: Canadian Mennonite University

Christopher Kennedy Huebner (born 1969) is an associate professor of theology and philosophy at Canadian Mennonite University, as well as co-editor of Herald Press's Polyglossia series.

Huebner was born and raised in Winnipeg. He received a Bachelor of Theology degree from Canadian Mennonite Bible College in 1992, as well as Bachelor of Arts and Master of Arts degrees in philosophy from the University of Manitoba in 1992 and 1995 respectively. He received a Doctor of Philosophy degree in theology and ethics from Duke University in 2002 with the dissertation Unhandling History: Anti-Theory, Ethics, and the Practice of Witness. Prior to teaching at CMU, he was a part-time instructor in philosophy at the University of Manitoba; an instructor in religion and philosophy at Meredith College; and an instructor in the university writing program at Duke University. Huebner's writing is primarily in the area of philosophical theology and can be located at the intersection of politics and epistemology, with a special interest in questions of peace and violence.

== Selected bibliography ==
Anyone who reads Huebner's reflections and analysis of the habits that shape our lives—and in particular, how those habits threaten to erode the significance of memory for those who have lost the ability to remember—will be stricken by the gentle wisdom that informs his description of those whom he knows he must remember.

— Stanley Hauerwas

=== Books ===
- The Wisdom of the Cross: Essays in Honor of John Howard Yoder. Co-edited with Hauerwas, Stanley; Huebner, Harry J.; Thiessen Nation, Mark. Grand Rapids, Michigan: Wm. B. Eerdmans Publishing Company. 1999. ISBN 978-0-8028-3862-9.
- A Precarious Peace: Yoderian Explorations on Theology, Knowledge, and Identity. Waterloo, Ontario: Herald Press. 2006. ISBN 978-0-8361-9341-1.
- The New Yoder. Co-edited with Dula, Peter. Eugene, Oregon: Cascade Books. 2010. ISBN 978-1-60899-044-3.

=== Theses ===
- Alasdair MacIntyre's Tradition-Constituted Enquiry: An Examination of Its Aristotelian Elements (MA thesis). Winnipeg, Manitoba: University of Manitoba. 1995. hdl:1993/18853. ISBN 978-0-612-13200-9.
- Unhandling History: Anti-Theory, Ethics, and the Practice of Witness (PhD diss.). Durham, North Carolina: Duke University. 2002.

=== Book chapters ===
- "History, Theory, and Anabaptism: A Conversation on Theology After John Howard Yoder". With Hauerwas, Stanley. In Hauerwas, Stanley; Huebner, Harry J.; Thiessen Nation, Mark. The Wisdom of the Cross: Essays in Honor of John Howard Yoder. Grand Rapids, Michigan: Wm. B. Eerdmans Publishing Company. 1999. ISBN 978-0-8028-3862-9.
- "The Work of Inheritance: Reflections on Receiving John Howard Yoder". In Bergen, Jeremy M.; Siegrist, Anthony G. Power and Practices: Engaging the Work of John Howard Yoder. Waterloo, Ontario: Herald Press. 2009. ISBN 978-0-8361-9447-0.
- "Marginality, Martyrdom, and the Messianic Remnant: Reflections on the Political Witness of St. Paul". In Reimer, Stephen R.; Gay, David. Locating the Past/Discovering the Present: Perspectives on Religion, Culture, and Marginality. Edmonton: University of Alberta Press. 2010. pp. 131–148.
- "The Work of Reading: Hauerwas, MacIntyre, and the Question of Liberalism". In Pinches, Charles R.; Johnson, Kelly S.; Collier, Charles M. Unsettling Arguments: A Festschrift on the Occasion of Stanley Hauerwas's 70th Birthday. Eugene, Oregon: Cascade Books. 2010. pp. 284–299.
- "Is a Christian University Strange Enough?" In Doerksen, Paul G.; Koop, Karl. The Church Made Strange for the Nations: Essays in Ecclesiology and Political Theology. Eugene, Oregon: Pickwick Publications. 2011. pp. 152–159.

=== Journal articles ===
- "Review of Artists, Citizens, Philosophers: Seeking the Peace of the City: An Anabaptist Theology of Culture by Duane K. Friesen". Mennonite Quarterly Review. 76 (1). 2002.
- "Review of The Politics of the Cross: The Theology and Social Ethics of John Howard Yoder by Craig A. Carter". Modern Theology. 18 (2). 2002. doi:10.1111/1468-0025.00190. ISSN 1468-0025.
- "Bioethics and the Church: Technology, Martyrdom, and the Moral Significance of the Ordinary" (PDF). Vision: A Journal for Church and Theology. 4 (1): 74–81. 2003. ISSN 1492-7799.
- "Peace and War in the Nation-State and Beyond: A Response to George Weigel, 'Moral Clarity in a Time of War'". Mennonite Life. 58 (2). 2003. Archived from the original on 7 January 2018.
- "Review of The Nonviolent Atonement by J. Denny Weaver". Modern Theology. 20 (3). 2004. doi:10.1111/j.1468-0025.2004.00264.x. ISSN 1468-0025.
- "Review of John Howard Yoder: Mennonite Patience, Evangelical Witness, Catholic Convictions by Mark Thiessen Nation". Journal of Religion. 87 (3): 441–443. 2007. doi:10.1086/519879. ISSN 1549-6538.
- "Review of The End of Memory: Remembering Rightly in a Violent World by Miroslav Volf". Modern Theology. 24 (3): 513–516. 2008. doi:10.1111/j.1468-0025.2008.00476.x. ISSN 1468-0025.
