= Aitken University Centre =

Multipurpose arena in Fredericton, New Brunswick

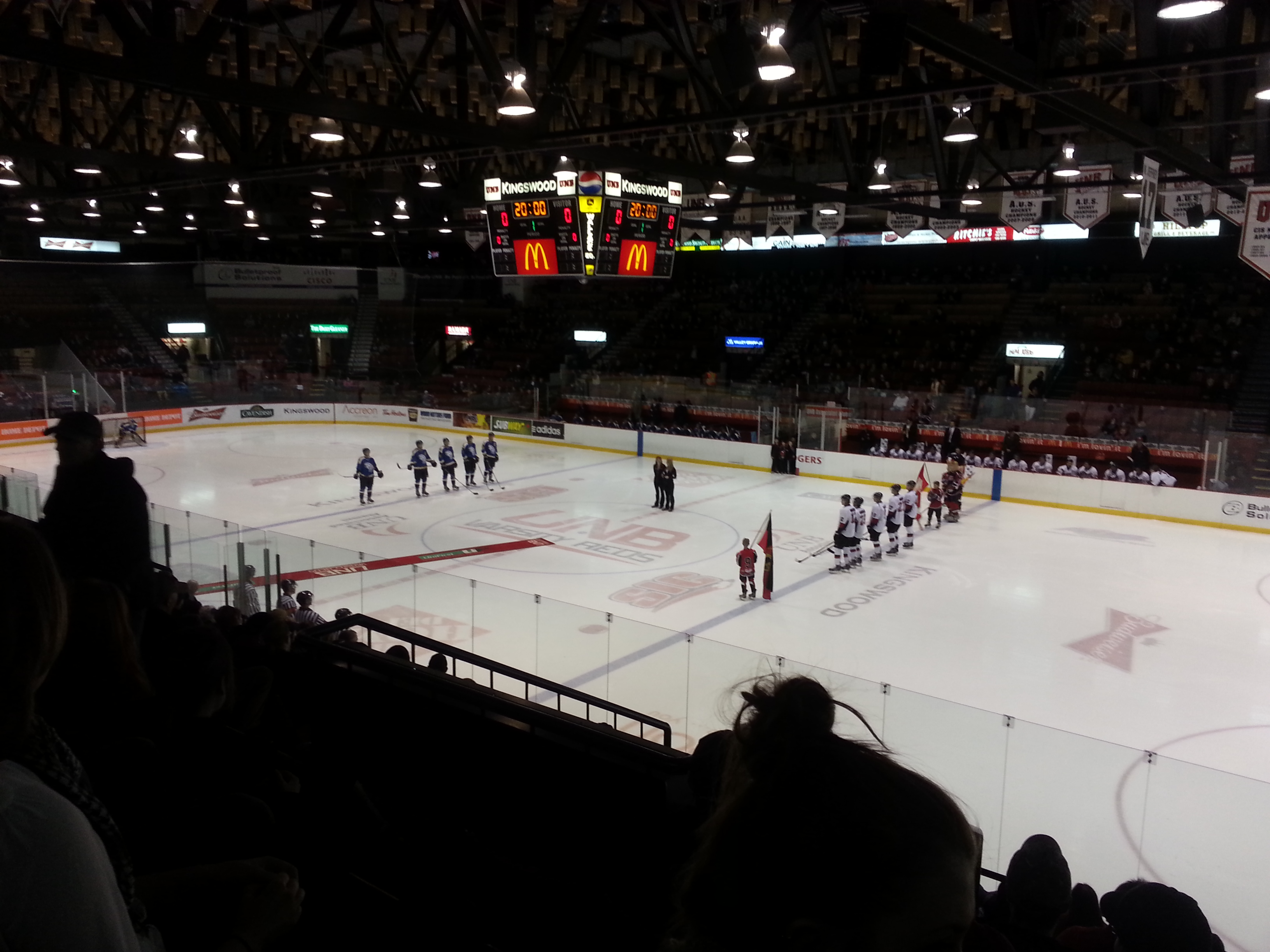
- Interior of the Aitken Centre
- Interactive map of Aitken University Centre
- Location: 20 MacKay Drive; Fredericton, New Brunswick; E3B 5A3
- Coordinates: 45.941959°N 66.641884°W
- Owner: University of New Brunswick
- Capacity: 3,278 (seated, hockey); 4,258 (Concerts)
- Surface: 200' X 90'

Construction
- Opened: 1976

Tenants
- UNB Reds (AUS) 1976-present Fredericton Express (AHL) 1981-1988; Fredericton Canadiens (AHL) 1990-1999

The Aitken University Centre is located on the campus of the University of New Brunswick in Fredericton, New Brunswick.

It was constructed in 1976. Sir Max Aitken, 2nd Baronet was then the university's chancellor and he was succeeded by his wife, Lady Vi Aitken, who was also a sportsperson, in 1982. It was the home of the UNB Reds hockey and hosted UNB basketball games until the construction of the Richard J. Currie Center (sic) in 2011. The arena hosted the University Cup in 2003, 2004, 2011, 2012, 2017 and 2018. The Aitken Centre was also the venue for the 2006 CIS Women's basketball championships, and the 2007 and 2008 CIS Women's volleyball championships.

The arena's capacity is 3,278 for ice events and 4,258 for concerts.

== Other uses ==
Aitken University Centre, UNB

The Aitken Centre was home to the American Hockey League's Fredericton Express (1981–1988) and Fredericton Canadiens (1990–1999).

The arena was used as a set during the filming of the television miniseries Canada Russia '72. It stood in for the Montreal Forum, Maple Leaf Gardens and Luzhniki Palace of Sports.

The arena has also hosted numerous curling events, such as the 2024 Canadian Mixed Doubles Curling Championship, 2024 U Sports University Curling Championships, and the 2024 CCAA College Curling Championships.
