= Katie Funk Wiebe =

Katie Funk Wiebe (September 15, 1924 – October 23, 2016) was an influential Canadian-American writer, speaker and historian of Russian Mennonite background. Funk Wiebe was born and grew up in Saskatchewan, Canada, and attended Mennonite Brethren Bible College, later Canadian Mennonite University in Winnipeg, before getting married and relocating to Hillsboro, Kansas. She taught at Bethany Bible Institute and Tabor College, and authored many books on Mennonite Brethren history, with a particular focus on women's issues in the church. As such she is considered a pioneer of feminist Mennonite writing. She died in 2016 in Wichita, Kansas.
