= Campus Manitoba =

Campus Manitoba (CMB) was a consortium of Manitoba's public post-secondary institutions intended to reduce barriers and enable the achievement of educational goals for Manitoba's student population.

CMB served as a conduit that provided access to online college and university courses for public post-secondary students currently admitted to one of seven partner institutions. Courses were developed and offered by Assiniboine Community College, Brandon University, Red River College, Université de Saint-Boniface, University College of the North, University of Manitoba, and University of Winnipeg. CMB's admin office was located at Brandon University and consisted of staff members who provided academic and logistical support for Manitoba's post-secondary students.

On July 17, 2014, the Government of Manitoba officially announced the launch of the new CMB website and a commitment to online education in Manitoba. Through its website, eCampus Manitoba (eCMB), CMB helps students of seven public post-secondary institutions in Manitoba browse and request permission to take courses from universities or colleges in Manitoba other than their own. After following the correct procedure and consulting an academic advisor, students can enroll in the course and receive credit at their own institution for completing the coursework.

In addition to maintaining eCMB and servicing Manitoba's post-secondary students, CMB has been tasked with "developing an online credit transfer system that will help students transition between institutions, from college to university or vice versa, without losing credits or repeating similar courses." In fall of 2014, Manitoba's NDP government's throne speech reconfirmed its commitment to "launch a new Credit Transfer Portal to help students move more easily between programs and institutions."

On April 26, 2013, the Government of Manitoba announced that CMB's services would be offered exclusively online due to decreasing enrollment in the programs at rural CMB offices. Previously, CMB consisted of centres located in rural Manitoban communities. These offices were staffed by CMB coordinators who provided academic and logistical support for students enrolled in distance courses through CMB. The centres were located in Altona, Boissevain, Brandon, Carman, Crosslake, Dauphin, Eriksdale, Flin Flon, Killarney, Portage la Prairie, Steinbach, Swan River, The Pas, Thompson in Manitoba and at Whitebear in Saskatchewan.

== Closure ==
After more than 35 years of operation, Campus Manitoba ceased operations on June 26, 2026. Prior to its closure, Campus Manitoba supported a number of provincial online learning and open education initiatives, including the Open Education Manitoba PressbooksEDU Network.

Following the closure of Campus Manitoba, Brandon University assumed interim hosting and stewardship of the Open Education Manitoba Pressbooks platform while future plans are considered with government and post-secondary partners. The platform continues to provide free, openly licensed textbooks and other open educational resources (OER) for educators, students, and institutions throughout Manitoba.

Open educational resources created through Open Education Manitoba Pressbooks remain publicly available.
