= Booth University College =

Private Christian liberal arts university college in Winnipeg, Manitoba, Canada

Coordinates: 49.8929°N 97.1514°W

- Other names: Salvation Army William and Catherine Booth University College; Booth UC; BUC
- Former name: Catherine Booth Bible College
- Motto: Education for a better world
- Type: Private university college
- Established: 1982
- Religious affiliation: Salvation Army
- Budget: $6.12 million (2016–17)
- President: Rob Finger
- Academic staff: 16
- Students: 420
- Location: Winnipeg, Manitoba, Canada
- Campus: Urban
- Colours: Blue; yellow; red
- Website: boothuc.ca

Booth University College (Booth UC or BUC), incorporated as the Salvation Army William and Catherine Booth University College, is a private, Christian liberal arts university college located in downtown Winnipeg, Manitoba, Canada. It is affiliated with the Salvation Army, a Christian organization presently operating in more than 130 countries.

== History ==
Booth University College was established in 1982 as Catherine Booth Bible College. It was renamed William and Catherine Booth College in 1997 in honour of The Salvation Army's co-founders, William Booth and Catherine Booth. On 17 June 2010, the college officially became Booth University College. Close to 300 students are enrolled at the Winnipeg Campus (September to April). Additional students are enrolled through Booth UC's School for Continuing Studies (which offers spring, summer, and online courses).

== Facilities ==
Booth University College is located in downtown Winnipeg at 290 Vaughan Street. In addition to classrooms, office space and a chapel along with a Bistro.

The University College's John Fairbank Memorial Library is located at 290 Vaughan Street, which is a three-minute walk from the main campus at Webb Place. The library has over 55,000 books as well as a subscription to 115,000 ebooks. The centre houses a rare and growing collection of Salvation Army books, pamphlets, reports and periodicals.

Petersen Hall, located at the Vaughan Street portion of the campus, is home to Booth's School for Continuing Studies and a growing business degree program. Opened in January 2015, Petersen Hall provides three classrooms meant to extend the reach of Booth University College far beyond its campus in Winnipeg.

== Academic programs ==
- Social Sciences
  - Psychology
  - Behavioural Sciences
- Humanities
  - General Studies
  - English and Film
  - Religion
- Professional Studies
  - Social Work
  - Business Administration
    - Majors in Accounting, Financial Crime, Management and Innovation, and Marketing and Communication available.
- School for Continuing Studies
  - Certificate in Applied Leadership
  - Certificate in Chaplaincy and Spiritual Care
  - Certificate in Not-for-Profit Management
  - Certificate in Advanced Leadership for Congregations
  - Certificate in Kroc Center Leadership

== See also ==
- Higher education in Manitoba
- List of colleges and universities named after people
