= Mid-Ocean School of Media Arts =

Coordinates: 49.9062°N 97.1838°W

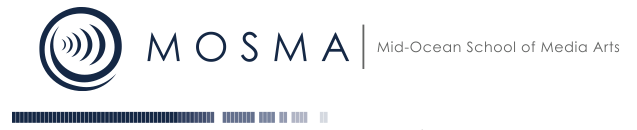
- Type: Private, vocational
- Established: 1994
- Location: 1588 Erin St., Winnipeg, Manitoba, R3E 2T1, Canada
- Campus: Urban
- Nickname: MOSMA
- Website: www.midoceanschool.ca

Mid-Ocean School of Media Arts (MOSMA) is a private vocational institution located in Winnipeg, Manitoba.

MOSMA was founded in 1994 with a specific focus in delivering education in audio production technology through theoretical and practical study including mentorships with recording artists, audio engineers, and producers. The institution offers a six-month diploma program (Audio in Media) as well as a series of self-interest part-time courses.

The institution, as legally required, is governed by The Private Vocational Institutions Act and Manitoba Regulation 237/02. This legislation provides consumer protection and ensures that the training gives students the skills and knowledge relevant to their chosen field of employment.

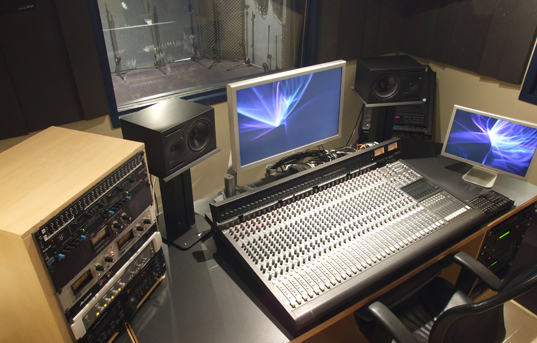
Studio A Control Room

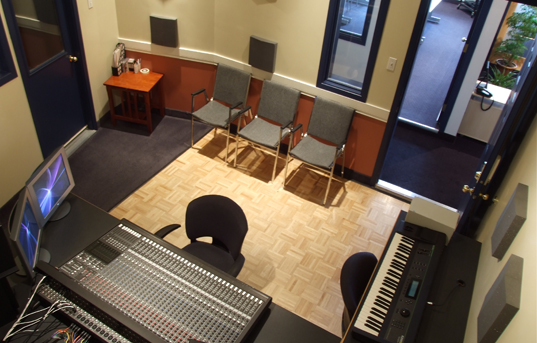
Studio B Control Room

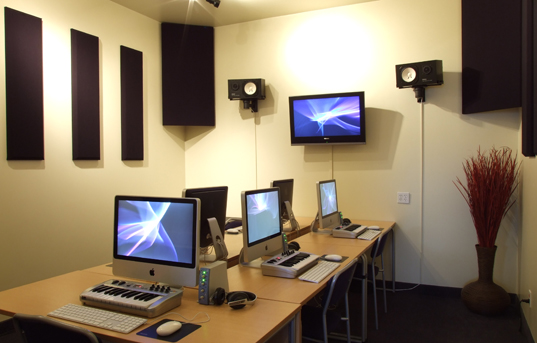
Studio C Lab Room

== Curriculum ==
The Audio in Media six-month program is divided into three terms. Terms 1 and 2 include initial subjects of study such as acoustics, psychoacoustics, ear training and audio production equipment components such as audio production consoles, microphones, recording media and signal processors. Delivery of curriculum includes both theoretical introduction to subjects followed by hands-on work within three dedicated in school production rooms. Term 3 (Practicums) requires students to complete audio production projects such as music multi-track recording, radio jingle production and sound design for video. Students also complete a Live Sound module hosted by a local Venue with a live band.

The institution utilizes an assessment criteria divided into 40% theoretical/written tests and 60% practical evaluations. The Audio in Media program accepts a maximum enrolment of 15 students.

Alongside the Audio in Media program, the school currently lists 3 short courses for its 2024 curriculum: Studio Recording; Editing and Mixing Techniques; and Pro Tools Specialist Certification.
