= Manitoba School for the Deaf =

Location
- 242 Stradford Street; Winnipeg, Manitoba; Canada
- Coordinates: 49.89610°N 97.31984°W

Information
- School type: Provincial School for the Deaf
- Grades: K-12
- Language: American Sign Language (ASL), English
- Website: Official website

The Manitoba School for the Deaf is a provincial school in Winnipeg, Manitoba with both residential and day programs serving deaf and hard-of-hearing students.

The school teaches both elementary and secondary students, using Bilingual-Bicultural method.

Student population is approximately 40 students in the senior school and 60 in the elementary school.

Deaf students from Canada often attend Gallaudet University in Washington D.C. for post secondary programs. Some Deaf students attend at University of Manitoba for post secondary programs
