= List of universities in Canada =

Universities in Canada's provinces and territories

Universities in Canada are established and operate under provincial and territorial government charters or are directed by First Nations bands (Note: University nuhelotʼįne thaiyotsʼį nistameyimâkanak Blue Quills, in St. Paul Alberta) or by federal legislation. (Note: Royal Military College of Canada) Most public universities in the country are members of Universities Canada, a non-profit organization. The title "university" is protected under federal regulation.

As of September 2025, there are 155 universities with the legal status of "recognized". A university with such legal status has been given authority to grant degrees by formal legislative act(s) of the applicable provincial or territorial legislature. The total includes 41 theological schools and 13 affiliated colleges of larger universities with their own independent recognition (such as Saint Paul University and University of Trinity College, affiliated colleges of the University of Ottawa and the University of Toronto respectively). The universities offer education in English and French. Most French-speaking universities are located in Quebec, though several institutions outside the province are either francophone or bilingual. 1.8 million students are enrolled in university. Programs are offered to graduating high school students through choice; however, students must maintain specific entering averages, which generally range from 65 to 85%, depending on criteria set by the chosen university. On campus residences are available at 95% of universities in Canada.

== List of public universities ==
There are many public universities in Canada that are authorized to issue degrees. Degrees from Affiliated institutions and seminaries are typically awarded by the affiliate's parent institution.

Name	Province/territory	City/cities	Lang.	Est.	Undergraduate students		Graduate students		Total full-time students
Name	Province/territory	City/cities	Lang.	Est.	Full-time	Part-time	Full-time	Part-time	Total full-time students
Alberta University of the Arts	Alberta	Calgary	English	1926					1,150
Acadia University	Nova Scotia	Wolfville	English	1838	3,484	315	177	306	3,661
Algoma University	Ontario	Sault Ste. Marie, Brampton	English	2008	3,700	360	0	0	3,700
Athabasca University	Alberta	Athabasca, Calgary, Edmonton	English	1970	0	35,520	0	5,110	0
Atlantic School of Theology	Nova Scotia	Halifax	English	1971	14	3	25	27	39
Bishop's University	Quebec	Sherbrooke	English	1843	2,400	300	240	40	2,640
Brandon University	Manitoba	Brandon	English	1899	2,220	370	210	180	2,430
Brock University	Ontario	St. Catharines, Hamilton	English	1964	15,600	2,300	1,500	220	17,100
Cape Breton University	Nova Scotia	Sydney	English	1974	2,668	341	413	250	3,081
Capilano University	British Columbia	North Vancouver	English	1968					3,775
Carleton University	Ontario	Ottawa	English	1942	19,600	6,600	3,700	660	23,300
Concordia University	Quebec	Montreal	English	1974	20,600	9,760	7,240	650	27,840
Dalhousie University	Nova Scotia	Halifax, Truro	English	1818	15,058	1,696	3,844	747	18,902
Emily Carr University of Art and Design	British Columbia	Vancouver	English	1925	1,670	200	0	0	1,670
Kwantlen Polytechnic University	British Columbia	Richmond, Surrey, Langley, Cloverdale	English	1981	11,170	1,400	150	10	11,320
Lakehead University	Ontario	Thunder Bay, Orillia	English	1965	5,700	1,400	1,400	10	7,100
MacEwan University	Alberta	Edmonton	English	1971	12,740	1,950	0	0	12,740
Mount Royal University	Alberta	Calgary	English	1910	10,620	1,000	0	0	10,620
University of Alberta	Alberta	Edmonton, Camrose, Calgary	Bilingual	1906	33,180	1,900	6,950	1,460	40,130
University of Calgary	Alberta	Calgary, Edmonton	English	1966	27,050	1,280	6,990	1,010	34,040
University of Lethbridge	Alberta	Lethbridge, Edmonton, Calgary	English	1967	6,900	630	580	160	7,480
Royal Roads University	British Columbia	Victoria	English	1995	610	0	2,610	0	3,220
Simon Fraser University	British Columbia	Burnaby, Surrey, Vancouver	English	1965	13,200	12,490	3,930	760	17,130
Thompson Rivers University	British Columbia	Kamloops	English	1970	7,690	700	750	45	8,440
University of British Columbia	British Columbia	Vancouver, Kelowna	English	1908	41,330	16,180	11,040	1,790	52,370
University of Victoria	British Columbia	Victoria	English	1963	14,350	4,440	3,050	220	17,400
University of the Fraser Valley	British Columbia	Abbotsford, Chilliwack, Mission	English	1974	7,090	2,110	30	40	7,120
University of Northern British Columbia	British Columbia	Prince George	English	1990	1,730	930	540	110	2,270
Vancouver Island University	British Columbia	Nanaimo, Duncan, Parksville, Powell River	English	1969	5,270	1,080	500	300	5,770
University College of the North	Manitoba	The Pas, Thompson	English	1966					2,400
University of Manitoba	Manitoba	Winnipeg	Bilingual	1877	22,700	3,960	3,140	570	25,840
Université de Saint-Boniface	Manitoba	Winnipeg	French	1818	700	120	0	110	700
University of Winnipeg	Manitoba	Winnipeg	English	1871	8,540	1,750	170	90	8,710
Mount Allison University	New Brunswick	Sackville	English	1839	2,434	107	14	1	2,448
St. Thomas University	New Brunswick	Fredericton	English	1910	1,639	95	48	1	1,687
University of New Brunswick	New Brunswick	Fredericton, Saint John	English	1785	8,722	742	1,106	703	9,828
Université de Moncton	New Brunswick	Moncton, Shippagan, Edmundston	French	1963	5,059	271	704	237	5,763
Memorial University of Newfoundland	Newfoundland	St. John's, Corner Brook	English	1925	11,223	1,361	2,804	1,190	14,027
Mount Saint Vincent University	Nova Scotia	Halifax	English	1873	2,235	467	160	857	2,395
Nova Scotia College of Art and Design University	Nova Scotia	Halifax	English	1887	605	122	43	19	648
Saint Francis Xavier University	Nova Scotia	Antigonish	English	1853	3,929	417	75	601	4,004
Saint Mary's University	Nova Scotia	Halifax	English	1802	4,185	385	478	130	4,663
Université Sainte-Anne	Nova Scotia	Pointe-de-l'Église	French	1890	636	28	12	23	648
University of King's College	Nova Scotia	Halifax	English	1789	829	33	120	1	949
Laurentian University	Ontario	Sudbury, Hearst, Kapuskasing, Timmins	Bilingual	1960	4,700	1,700	1,400	300	6,100
McMaster University	Ontario	Hamilton	English	1887	30,400	1,300	4,700	930	35,100
Nipissing University	Ontario	North Bay, Bracebridge, Brantford	English	1992	3,600	1,400	170	0	3,770
Ontario College of Art and Design University	Ontario	Toronto	English	1876	9,300	730	230	80	9,530
Queen's University at Kingston	Ontario	Kingston	English	1841	23,600	3,600	5,600	1,000	29,200
Royal Military College of Canada	Ontario	Kingston	Bilingual	1876	1,150	710	400	400	1,550
Toronto Metropolitan University	Ontario	Toronto	English	1948	30,600	14,300	2,700	270	33,300
Trent University	Ontario	Peterborough, Oshawa	English	1963	10,200	1,600	670	170	10,870
Université de Hearst	Ontario	Hearst, Timmins, Kapuskasing	French	1953					280
Université de l'Ontario français	Ontario	Toronto	French	2018					233
Université de Sudbury	Ontario	Sudbury	French	1913					30
University of Guelph	Ontario	Guelph, Toronto, Ridgetown	English	1964	24,400	3,600	2,900	280	27,300
Ontario Tech University	Ontario	Oshawa	English	2002	9,300	730	750	270	10,050
University of Ottawa	Ontario	Ottawa	Bilingual	1848	34,300	5,900	7,100	1,500	41,400
University of Toronto	Ontario	Toronto, Mississauga	English (Note: The University of Toronto operates as an anglophone institution. However, a graduate school of the university, the Ontario Institute for Studies in Education, operates as a bilingual institution.)	1827	69,400	6,400	20,000	1,600	89,400
University of Waterloo	Ontario	Waterloo, Cambridge, Kitchener, Stratford	English	1957	34,700	1,300	4,800	1,400	39,500
University of Western Ontario	Ontario	London	English	1878	35,100	1,900	7,000	420	42,100
University of Windsor	Ontario	Windsor	English	1857	10,200	1,600	5,800	10	16,000
Wilfrid Laurier University	Ontario	Waterloo, Brantford, Milton, Toronto, Kitchener	English	1911	16,700	3,600	1,100	1,100	17,800
York University	Ontario	Toronto, Markham	English (Note: York University operates as an anglophone institution. However, a federated college of the university, Glendon College, operates as a bilingual institution.)	1959	41,000	5,700	4,600	1,500	45,600
University of Prince Edward Island	Prince Edward Island	Charlottetown	English	1969	4,343	298	551	0	4,894
École de technologie supérieure (Note: Part of the Université du Québec university system.)	Quebec	Montreal	French	1974	4,340	1,590	2,390	520	6,730
École nationale d'administration publique	Quebec	Quebec City, Montreal, Gatineau, Saguenay, Trois-Rivières	French	1969			810	1,190	810
Institut national de la recherche scientifique	Quebec	Quebec City, Montreal, Laval, Varennes	French	1969			580	50	580
McGill University	Quebec	Montreal, Ste-Anne-de-Bellevue	English	1821	24,140	2,810	7,910	1,700	32,050
Université de Montréal	Quebec	Montreal	French	1878	23,890	7,860	11,310	2,740	35,200
Université de Sherbrooke	Quebec	Sherbrooke	French	1954	11,650	2,170	5,410	6,080	17,060
Université du Québec en Abitibi-Témiscamingue	Quebec	Rouyn-Noranda, Mont-Laurier	French	1970	1,030	3,350	350	520	1,380
Université du Québec en Outaouais	Quebec	Gatineau, Saint-Jérôme	French	1970	3,140	1,780	810	710	3,950
Université du Québec à Chicoutimi	Quebec	Chicoutimi	French	1969	3,540	1,080	1,340	430	4,880
Université du Québec à Montréal	Quebec	Montreal	French	1969	16,500	10,010	4,610	4,130	21,110
Université du Québec à Rimouski	Quebec	Rimouski, Lévis	French	1969	2,550	2,580	850	580	3,400
Université du Québec à Trois-Rivières	Quebec	Trois-Rivières	French	1969	7,270	3,940	2,030	1,500	9,300
Université TÉLUQ	Quebec	Quebec City	French	1972	1,638	16,562	126	1,674	1,764
Université Laval	Quebec	Quebec City	French	1663	22,060	11,370	9,290	4,970	31,350
University of Regina	Saskatchewan	Regina, Saskatoon, Swift Current	English (Note: University of Regina operates as an anglophone institution. However, its institution La Cité is francophone.)	1911	14,474		2,027		16,501
University of Saskatchewan	Saskatchewan	Saskatoon, Prince Albert	English	1907	17,260	1,560	3,040	530	20,300
Yukon University	Yukon	Whitehorse	English	1983 (Note: 2020 as University)					1,285

== List of private universities ==
The following is a list of private universities that are authorized to issue degrees by a provincial authority. The following list does not include satellite campuses, for example Northeastern University in Toronto or Niagara University, nor does it lnclude branches in Canada for universities based in the United States. All of them are English language institutions.

Name	City	Province	Est.	Students			Faith-based
Name	City	Province	Est.	Undergrad.	Graduate	Total	Faith-based
Ambrose University	Calgary	Alberta	1921			487 (2025)	Yes
Booth University College	Winnipeg	Manitoba	1982	420	0	420	Yes
Burman University	Lacombe	Alberta	1907			334 (2025)	Yes
Canadian Mennonite University	Winnipeg	Manitoba	1999			630	Yes
Concordia University of Edmonton	Edmonton	Alberta	1921	1,822	289	2,146 (2025)	No (Note: Concordia University of Edmonton was formerly affiliated with Lutheran Church-Canada until 2016, when the university ended its affiliation and became a secular institution.)
Crandall University	Moncton	New Brunswick	1949			1,104	Yes
Kingswood University	Sussex	New Brunswick	1945			186	Yes
Pacific Coast University for Workplace Health Sciences	Port Alberni	British Columbia	2007				No
Providence University College and Theological Seminary	Otterburne	Manitoba	1925			440	Yes
Redeemer University	Hamilton	Ontario	1982	1,117	0	1,117 (2025)	Yes
St. Mary's University, Calgary	Calgary	Alberta	1986			846 (2025)	Yes
St. Stephen's University	St. Stephen	New Brunswick	1975	0	213	213	Yes
The King's University	Edmonton	Alberta	1979			695 (2025)	Yes
Trinity Western University	Langley	British Columbia	1962	3,000	3,000	6,000	Yes
Tyndale University	Toronto	Ontario	1894	515	925	1,440	Yes
University Canada West	Vancouver	British Columbia	2005			7,000	No
University of Fredericton	Fredericton	New Brunswick	2005			4,000	No
University of Niagara Falls Canada	Niagara Falls	Ontario	2024			500–3,000	No
Yorkville University	Fredericton, Toronto, Vancouver, Vaughan	British Columbia, New Brunswick, Ontario	2003				No

== See also ==
- Rankings of universities in Canada
- List of colleges and universities by country
- List of colleges in Canada
- Lists of universities and colleges
- List of Canadian universities by endowment
- List of Canadian university chancellors and vice-chancellors
- U15 (universities)
- List of medical schools in Canada
- List of law schools in Canada
- List of business schools in Canada
- List of architecture schools in Canada
- List of unaccredited institutions of higher learning
- Open access in Canada
- Higher education in Canada
