= Evangelical Mennonite Conference =

Canadian Anabaptist denomination

- Abbreviation: EMC
- Orientation: Mennonite
- Theology: Evangelical Anabaptist
- Polity: Congregationalist
- Region: Canada
- Headquarters: Steinbach, Manitoba, Canada
- Origin: 1812; Molochansk, Russia (present day Ukraine)
- Congregations: 62
- Official website: emconference.ca

The Evangelical Mennonite Conference is a conference of evangelical Mennonite Christians headquartered in Steinbach, Manitoba, Canada, with 62 churches from British Columbia to southern Ontario. It includes people with a wide range of cultural and denominational backgrounds.

== Overview ==
The churches of the Evangelical Mennonite Conference are located in five west-central Canadian provinces from British Columbia to Ontario. In 2012 there were over 7,200 members in 62 churches, with roughly 150 ministers serving the churches. The congregations are organized into nine regions. Mission work is established in 25 countries, often working in formal mission partnerships with evangelical interdenominational or Anabaptist organizations.

The EMC has five national boards with wide-ranging responsibilities. It, however, is ultimately governed by its churches together, whose delegates are to attend conference council meetings twice a year and whose ministerial members are to meet nationally twice a year (including on retreat).

The EMC archives, offices, and its Steinbach Christian High School and Steinbach Bible College are located in Steinbach, Manitoba, Canada. The EMC is linked to the graduate-level School of Ministry and Theology connected with Canadian Mennonite University in Winnipeg.

The Messenger, an official publication of the conference, is printed 12 times per year and available on-line. Theodidaktos, Journal for EMC theology and education is published once or twice a year and available on-line. The conference also occasionally publishes a Christian Education Update. In 2006 it published Follow Me, a Sunday School resource on biblical social justice. The conference has also published preaching helps and produced CDs booklets on Peace Sermons (2011, 2008, 2007).

In the 1940s an evangelical revival in the EMC was led by Rev. Ben D. Reimer and others. The defining mark of the EMC in recent years has been its missions emphasis. Currently, more than half of the Conference's national budget goes to missions. Church planting within Canada is a concern that is reflected within the national budget.

There is a growing emphasis on holistic ministry, not simply on multiplying churches, but on churches reflecting more of Jesus' calling Christians to "obey everything that I have commanded you" (Matthew 28:20). This is seen as, in part, a return to the holistic emphasis of Menno Simons, the early Dutch leader, that "true evangelical faith...cannot lie dormant, but manifests itself in all righteousness and works of love" (The Complete Writings of Menno Simons, 307).

The Evangelical Mennonite Conference is a member of the Evangelical Fellowship of Canada, Mennonite Central Committee, the Mennonite World Conference, and other organizations.

== History ==
=== Klaas Reimer ===
The Evangelical Mennonite Conference traces its roots back to 1812, when the Kleine Gemeinde was founded in the Molotschna settlement of southern Russia (now Ukraine) by a group of Plautdietsch-speaking "Russian" Mennonites of Dutch-Prussian cultural background. Kleine Gemeinde means "Small" or "Little Church" in High German, while the Plautdietsch version of the name is "Kleen Gemeente".

Klaas Reimer (1770–1837), a Mennonite minister from Danzig, settled in Molotschna, a Mennonite settlement in southern Russia in 1805. Reimer felt Mennonites of the area were too lax in doctrine and piety, and began to hold meetings in homes in 1812. He was joined by another minister, Cornelius Janzen, and eighteen members, who together recognized themselves as a separate church body in 1814.

As for reasons for the 1812 separation, an 1838 pamphlet addresses five disputes with the main Mennonite body. The primary complaint was that Mennonite leaders were straying from their traditional nonresistant stance when they turned lawbreakers over to the government for punishment while at the same time church leaders became more lax in enforcing spiritual discipline. An increased use of alcohol and other vices were cited as evidence.

The second problem was inconsistent application of discipline for minor offenses; while the breakaway group was banned, other types of offenses were ignored. Third, to a disloyalty charge, they reaffirmed their submission to the government while maintaining a stance against any involvement with detaining or punishing offenders. Fourth, they did not approve of attending weddings, which had become worldly in their view. Its final criticism was aimed at sermons and eulogies at funerals, practices that had recently been adopted from Catholics and Lutherans.

=== Migration to North America ===
In 1870 the Russian government issued a proclamation stating the intention to end all special privileges granted to Mennonite colonists by 1880. Alarmed at the possibility of losing control of their schools and military exemption, a delegation of Mennonite and Hutterite leaders, including Cornelius Toews and David Claassen of the Kleine Gemeinde, visited North America in 1873 to investigate resettlement possibilities. In 1874–75, the main group proceeded to migrate to North America, the more conservative part settling in Manitoba, Canada, and the more liberal to Jefferson County, near the town of Jansen, Nebraska, US. All together some 200 Kleine Gemeide families emigrated to North America as part of a larger Mennonite migration. About eighty homesteaded in southern Manitoba, especially in the East Reserve, while a smaller group settled in Nebraska.

In 1860 a portion of this group migrated to Crimea under the leadership of Jakob Wiebe. This group adopted baptism by immersion. After migrating in 1874 to Kansas, they became known as the Krimmer Mennonite Brethren. The Jansen group moved to Kansas and eventually seceded from the Kleine Gemeinde. Later, a number of the Kleine Gemeinde went into the movement of Elder John Holdeman (Church of God in Christ, Mennonite).

=== Migration to Mexico ===
In 1948 conservative families of the Kleine Gemeinde, all together some 800 people, migrated from Canada to Los Jagueyes Colony (Quellenkolonie) some 100 km north of Cuauhtémoc, Chihuahua in Mexico. Resisting the radical changes of Kleine Gemeinde in Canada, the Mexican branch kept its name, tradition and identity and expanded to Belize in 1958 and later to Bolivia. In 2015 the Kleine Gemeinde had some 4,500 members - all of Russian Mennonite ethnic origin - in Latin America, where it is still expanding.

=== Radical change in North America ===
In the mid-20th century, the denomination in Canada radically transformed in three major ways, by adopting evangelical theology, by gradually eliminating traditional Mennonite practices (such as plain dress) and by becoming a multi-lingual and multi-ethnic denomination. The first EMC missionary was Susanne Plett, who left as a missionary to Bolivia in 1945, though without official support. Others followed her example. In 1952 the Kleine Gemeinde in North America, which consisted of just 5 congregation at the time, changed its name to the Evangelical Mennonite Church, and then (because of a U.S. group of prior, same name) to the Evangelical Mennonite Conference in 1959. The much more conservative Kleine Gemeinde in Mexico kept the traditional name and most of the traditions of the Kleine Gemeinde. From 1946 to 1961 the EMC was influenced by the Western Gospel Mission, an evangelism/church planting initiative in Saskatchewan, Manitoba, and NW Ontario, by supportive members and churches of the EMC.

Edwin Wright, born in Wales, was the first non-Russian Mennonite pastor to serve in the EMC; he served churches at Endeavour, Sask., and Riverton, Man., in the 1960s Now many churches have leaders who are not of Russian Mennonite background. A worship service language shift from German to English among older congregations was largely completed in the 1960s; among younger churches, English was often the original language used.

Education became increasingly valued. The EMC became an official partner in Steinbach Bible College, which celebrated its 75th anniversary in 2012. Today many EMC members have college, university, or seminary degrees.

In recent decades, some Mennonites of more conservative backgrounds have moved back to Canada from Mexico and Paraguay and joined congregations (sometimes with the High German language being used in services). Latin Americans have also joined other congregations or started new churches (with Spanish and sometimes English being used).

=== Present ===
The EMC's members, adherents, and leaders are diverse in their church and cultural backgrounds. Since the 1940s the EMC has moved consciously beyond its historic Dutch-Prussian cultural roots and has expanded into other cultural groups. Recently it has developed Hispanic congregations. In Canada, worship services are conducted in three languages, with English being most commonly used.

The denomination celebrated its 200th anniversary in 2012. It stressed the spiritual history of the denomination. The denomination is engaged in a strategic planning process. In December 2012 its conference council delegates approved a grass-roots process to look at its Statement of Faith.

== Doctrine ==
Beliefs and practices of the Evangelical Mennonite Conference are presented in its "Statement of Faith" and "Church Practices," most recently revised in 1994. They reveal evangelical Christian teachings such as the Trinity, humanity's need, salvation through the substitutionary atonement of Jesus Christ, and the expected return of Christ. Underlying these beliefs are the final authority and infallibility of Scripture. The EMC is Arminian in theology: holding to total depravity, conditional election, unlimited atonement, resistible grace, and conditional security. Some members differ individually, more on the final point.

Anabaptist distinctives such as baptism upon confession of faith, non-conformity, mutual accountability, church discipline, congregational governance, non-swearing of oaths, and non-resistance are maintained.

Belief in Jesus and discipleship in lifestyle are not to be separated. Individual discipleship is to be shown through togetherness with other believers and service to wider society.

The Life of Peace (Statement of Faith, Article 9) includes, "Instead of taking up arms, we should do whatever we can to lessen human distress and suffering, even at the risk of our own lives." In The State (Church Practices, Article 9) it says, "Christians should respect civil authorities and pray for them; pay taxes; assume social responsibility; oppose corruption, discrimination, and injustice; and obey all their requirements that do not conflict with the Scriptures."

The EMC officially takes a complementarian stance and does not ordain women into the ministry. Some women, however, do serve in associate or senior pastoral roles. Women can serve on national boards and committees and as church delegates. Many women are active in missionary work. Discussions continue, unofficially, on the matter of women and church leadership.

Three ordinances are held — believers' baptism, the Lord's supper, and foot washing, though the last is not widely practiced. Baptism is by pouring or immersion.

Discussions on various theological and social issues are on-going. The EMC reflects a "community hermeneutic," the conviction and practice that the Scriptures are best interpreted by a gathered community, not simply as individuals nor as a clergy class handing down its decisions to so-called lay members.

== Members and congregations ==
As of 1998 the Evangelical Mennonite Conference had some 6,508 members in 53 congregations in Canada. In 2011, it had 62 churches and approximately 7,200 member of different ethnic backgrounds, including larger numbers of Hispanics and Africans.
