= Steinbach Christian School =

Steinbach Christian School (SCS)

Location
- Steinbach, Manitoba; Canada; 49.5359°N 96.6896°W

Information
- Type: Private
- Motto: Quality Education with a Christian Perspective
- Principal: Thor Barkman
- Faculty: 55
- Grades: K–12
- Enrollment: 437
- Mascot: Flames
- Website: www.steinbachchristian.ca

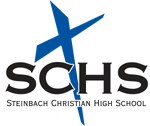
Logo used from 2010-2016

Steinbach Christian School (SCS; formerly Steinbach Christian High School) is a co-educational independent day school in Steinbach, Manitoba, Canada. The school comprises a Junior School (Kindergarten-Grade 4), a Middle School (grades 5-8) and a Senior School (grades 9 to 12) and shares a campus with the Steinbach Bible College. The school is associated with the Christian Mennonite Conference, the Evangelical Mennonite Conference, as well as the Southland Church and Emmanuel Evangelical Free Church in Steinbach.

== SCS Flames (Sports) ==
SCS competes in the HSD League. Senior Years students compete in Intramurals, crosscountry running, soccer, curling, basketball, volleyball, badminton and track and field. The Middle Years compete in volleyball, basketball, cross country running, badminton and track and field.

== Notable alumni ==
- Royden Loewen, historian
