= Pax (liturgy) =

Salutation in Catholic Mass

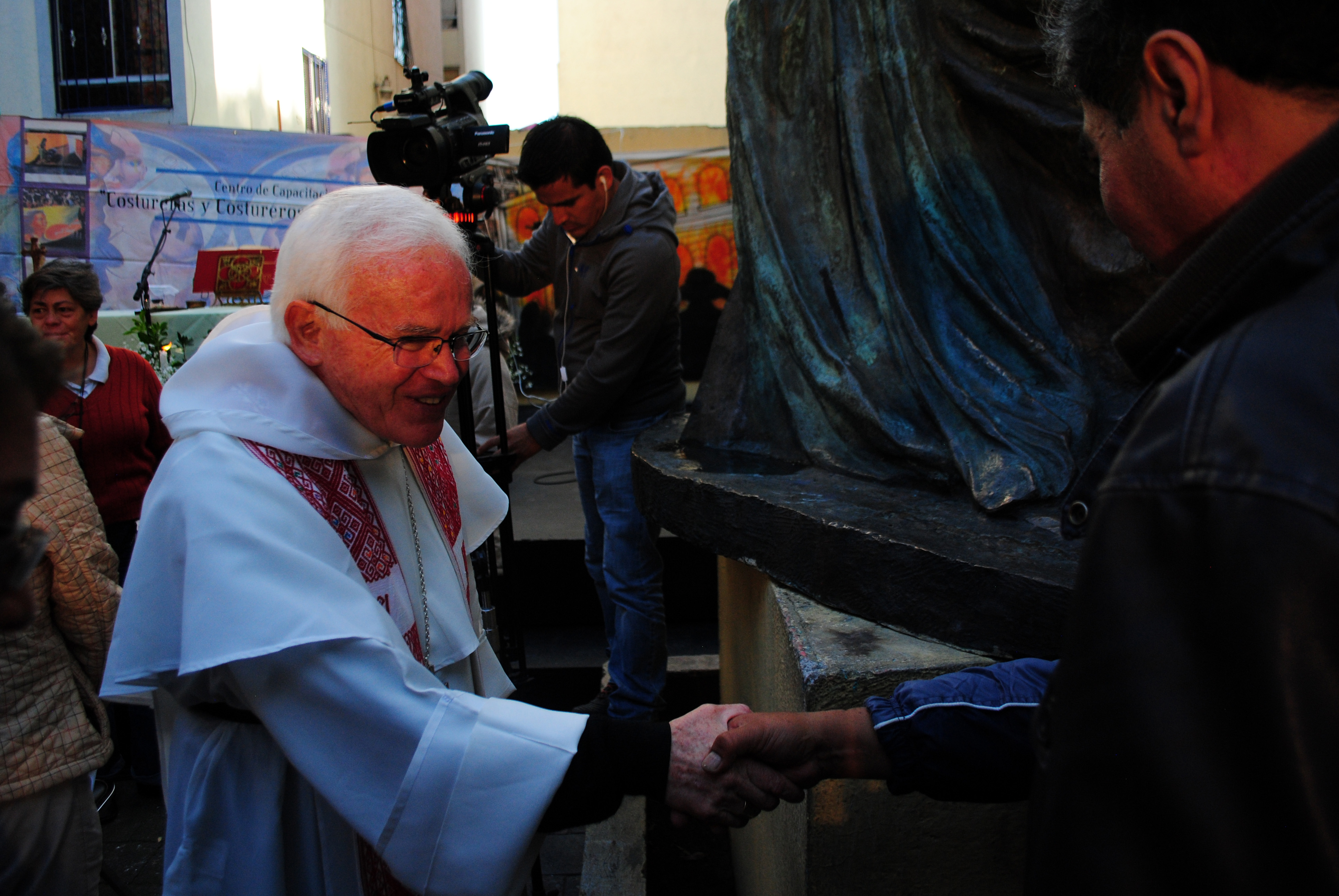
Mexican bishop Raúl Vera giving the Pax salutation

In Christian liturgy, "the Pax" is an abbreviation of the Latin salutations "pax vobis" ("peace to you") or "pax vobiscum" ("peace with you"), which are used in the Catholic Mass, the Lutheran Divine Service, and the Western Orthodox Mass.

== Origins ==
Like the other liturgical salutations, e. g., "Dominus vobiscum", the Pax is of biblical origin.

The Vulgate version of the Gospels contains such forms as "veniet pax vestra", "pax vestra revertetur ad vos" (literally, "may your peace return to you"; figuratively, "let your peace rest on you" or "may you be treated with the peace with which you treat others" (Matthew 10:13)), "pax huic domui" ("peace to this house" (Luke 10:5)), "pax vobis" ("peace be with you" (Luke 24:36, John 20:21, and 20:26)). The salutation "gratia vobis et pax" or "gratia misericordia et pax" is the opening formula of most of the Epistles of Saint Paul, Saint Peter, and Saint John, and of the Book of Revelation.

== Liturgical use ==
Jesus Christ and the Twelve Apostles quoted the formula from the Old Testament, and they were preserved in the liturgy and Christian epigraphy. Like the "Dominus vobiscum", they were first used in the liturgy, specifically in the form of "pax vobis", by the bishop in welcoming the faithful at the beginning of the Mass before the collect or oratio.

When the Confiteor, introit, and Gloria in excelsis were later added to the Mass, the "pax vobis" and "Dominus vobiscum" were preserved. The form "pax vobis" was employed by bishops and prelates only at the first collect, while priests used "Dominus vobiscum". Hence the "Dominus vobiscum" became the ordinary introduction to all the orations and most of the prayers. Greek Christians have preserved "pax omnibus" and "pax vobiscum".

There was a certain rivalry between the two formulae "pax vobis" and "Dominus vobiscum", and some councils, especially that of Braga in AD 561, ordained that both bishops and priests use the same form of salutation (for the texts, see the bibliography).

Besides this episcopal or sacerdotal salutation, "pax tecum", "pax vobis", or "pax vobiscum" are used in the liturgy at the kiss of peace. "Te" of "tecum" and "vobis" are the ablative forms of the second person singular and plural pronouns, respectively; both are translated in English as "you" (or “thee” and “you” respectively).

On such occasions the liturgy contains prayers or collects ad pacem. In the Ambrosian Liturgy, at the end of the Mass, the congregation is dismissed with "ite in pace". Edmond Martene gives other instances of the use of "pax".

In Christian epigraphy, there are a variety of formulae: "pax"; "in pace"; "pax tecum"; "vivas in pace"; "requiescat in pace"; "pax Christi tecum sit"; "anima dulcissima requiescas in pace"; "dormit in pace"; and "in locum refrigerii, lucis et pacis" (from the formula of the Mass at the Memento of the Dead).

== See also ==
- As-salamu alaykum
- Shalom
- Holy kiss
- Pax (liturgical object)

== Bibliography ==
- Peter Damian, an opusculum on Dominus Vobiscum in Patrologia Latina CXLV, 234;
- Zaccaria, Onomasticon, s. vv. Pax vobis and Salutatio episcopalis;
- Bona Rerum liturg., III, 12, 88 sqq.;
- Smith, Dict. of Christ. Antiq., s.v. Pax (cf. Dominus vobiscum);
- De dignitate sacerdotali (not written by St. Ambrose, as was long believed, but by Gerbert), v, in P.L.., XVII, 598 and CXXXIX, 175, contains an important text on this subject;
- Rocca De salutatione sacerdotis in missa et divinis officiis in Thesaurus antiquitat., I (Rome, 1745), 236;
- Edmond Martene, De antiquis ecclesiae ritibus, I, 151 sqq.;
- Mamachi, Origines et antiq. christ., IV, 479; III, 17, 19;
- Ephemerides liturg. (Feb., 1910), 108;
- Probst, Die abendlandische Messe, 104, 404, 437; see Dominus Vobiscum, V, 114;
- Cabrol in Dict. d'archeol. chret., s.v. Acclamations.

For the formula Pax and other formulas in funeral epigraphy:

- Kirsch, Die Acclamationen u. Gebete der altchristl. Grabschriften (Cologne, 1897);
- ____, Les acclamations des epitaphes chret. de l'antiquite et les prieres liturg. pour les defunts in IV Congres scientifique des Catholiques (Fribourg, 1898), 113–22;
- Syxto, Notiones archaeol. christ., II, Epigraphia, 94 sqq.;
- Cabrol, La priere pour les morts in Revue d'apologetique (15 Sept., 1909);
- ____, Livre de la priere antique, 67, 69.
