= Eberbach =

Eberbach can refer to:

- Eberbach (Baden), a city on the river Neckar in Baden-Württemberg, Germany
- Eberbach Abbey, a Cistercian monastery in Germany
- Eberbach Pax, a reliquary from Eberbach Abbey
- Eberbach-Seltz, a commune of the Bas-Rhin département in France
- Eberbach (Mergbach), a river of Hesse, Germany, tributary of the Mergbach
- Heinrich Eberbach, World War II German panzer general
- Konrad of Eberbach, (died 1221), Cistercian monk and later abbot of Eberbach Abbey
- Eberbach, the former German name of the Prussian village that is now Gortatowo, Poland
