= Steinbach Bible College =

Canadian Bible college in Manitoba

- Former names: Steinbach Bible Academy; Steinbach Bible Institute
- Motto: Follow Jesus, Serve the Church, Engage the World
- Type: Private Bible college
- Established: 1936
- Affiliations: Association for Biblical Higher Education
- Religious affiliation: Anabaptist
- President: Dave Reimer
- Students: 118 (2021)
- Location: Steinbach, Manitoba, Canada; 49°32′8.46″N 96°41′23.43″W
- Campus: Urban
- Language: English
- Sports team: Flames
- Website: sbcollege.ca

Steinbach Bible College (SBC) is an evangelical Anabaptist college located in Steinbach, Manitoba, Canada.

== History ==
The college opened in 1936 as a training school for Mennonite Brethren and Evangelical Mennonite Brethren churches of Canada. In 1947, it was renamed Steinbach Bible Academy.

== Affiliation ==
Steinbach Bible College holds accreditation from the Association for Biblical Higher Education. SBC shares a campus with Steinbach Christian School. Steinbach Bible College is a denominational college supported by four conferences of churches: the Christian Mennonite Conference, the Evangelical Mennonite Conference, the Evangelical Mennonite Mission Conference, and the Mennonite Brethren Church of Manitoba which is part of the Canadian Conference of Mennonite Brethren Churches.

== Programs ==
Steinbach Bible College offers several specializations:

- Ministry leadership, four-year bachelor of arts
- Biblical studies, options for three-year Bachelor of Arts, two-year associate of arts and one-year certificate
- Christian leadership (on campus or online), options for three-year Bachelor of Arts, two-year associate of arts and one-year certificate
- Marketplace, three-year bachelor of arts
- Pre-university, two-year associate of arts, one-year certificate

Additionally, the following programs are offered in partnership with other institutions:

- Bachelor of Social Work (in cooperation with Booth University College)
- TESOL Certificate (in cooperation with Providence University College)
- Pre-education (in cooperation with Canadian Mennonite University)

== See also ==
- List of evangelical seminaries and theological colleges
