= Royden Loewen =

Canadian history professor (born 1954)

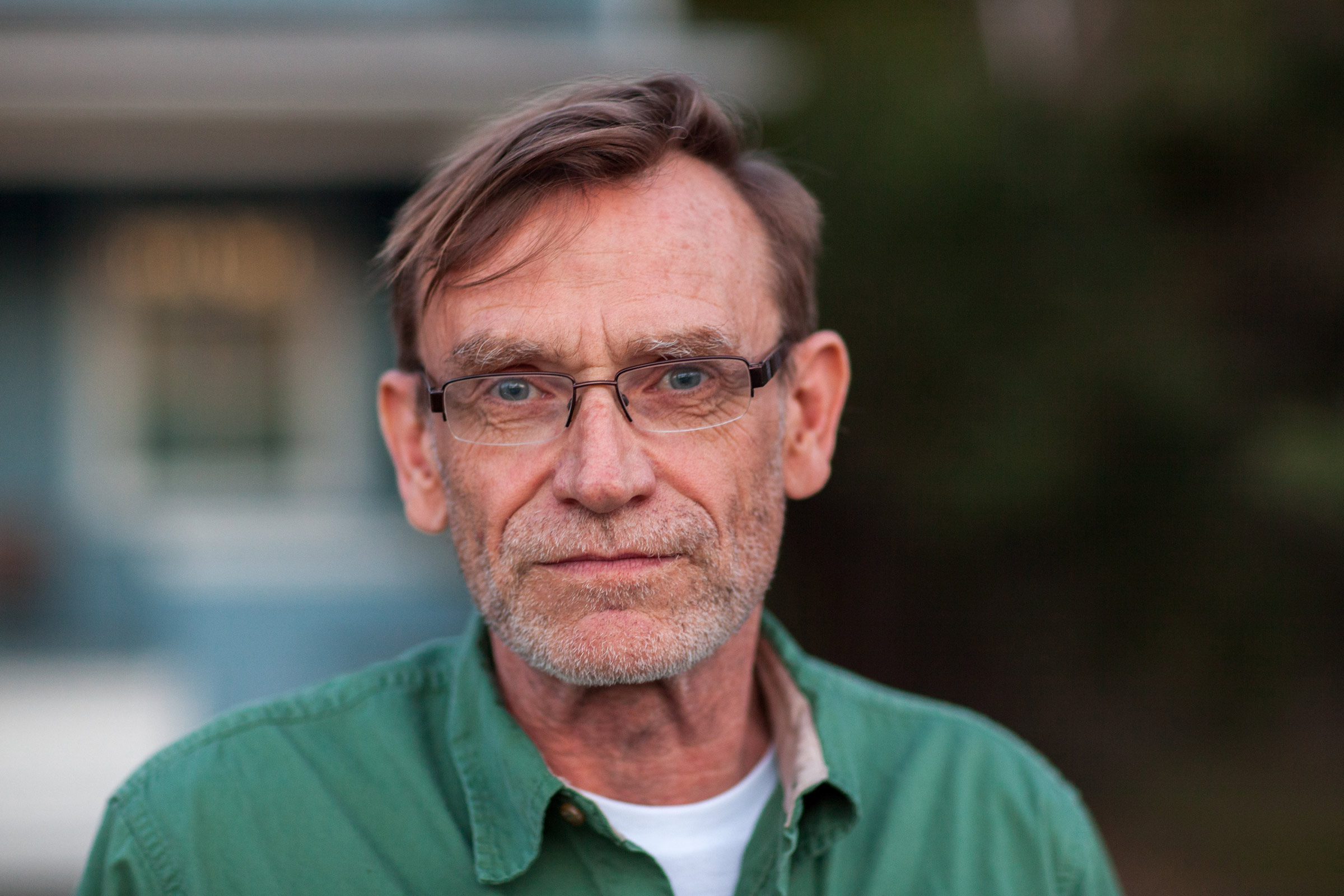
- Royden Loewen in 2013.
- Born: October 26, 1954 (age 71); Steinbach, Manitoba
- Occupation: Professor

Academic background
- Education: Canadian Mennonite University

Academic work
- Discipline: Mennonite History
- Institutions: University of Winnipeg; University of Manitoba

Royden Loewen (born 26 October 1954 in Steinbach, Manitoba, Canada) is a retired Canadian History Professor and Chair in Mennonite Studies at the University of Winnipeg. As a prominent historian in the field of Mennonite history, his book about the Mennonite Communities 1850–1930 is a leading publication about the emigration waves from south Russia to Canada.

== Education and career ==
Loewen was born in Steinbach, Manitoba, the son of Dave Loewen, a poultry and wheat farmer and chairman of the Steinbach Credit Union and Gertie Loewen, a homemaker and mother to six children. Loewen grew up in nearby Blumenort, where he attended elementary school, before attending high school at Steinbach Christian High School, and college at Mennonite Brethren Bible College where he earned his university degrees and a Fulbright scholarship at the University of Chicago. He taught Junior and High School at Fisher River Cree Nation in Manitoba's Interlake district and Canadian history at the University of Manitoba. From 1996 to 2020, he held the Chair in Mennonite Studies at the University of Winnipeg.

Loewen visited Mennonite settlements in Bolivia several times for a book on anti-modernity in Canada and Latin America. He was involved in the two-year project Seven Points on Earth, funded by the Social Sciences and Humanities Research Council of Canada, where he visited seven Mennonite farm villages around the world with graduate students from around the world, exploring the environmental history of villages in Java, Siberia, Friesland, Bulawayo, Santa Cruz departmento (Bolivia), Kansas and Manitoba.

Loewen lives in Winnipeg with his wife Mary Ann, who teaches academic writing at the University of Winnipeg. He retired in 2020, and was replaced by Dr. Ben Nobbs-Thiessen as the new Chair in Mennonite Studies.

== Bibliography ==
- Mennonite Farmers: A Global History of Place and Sustainability, University of Manitoba Press, 2021
- Horse and Buggy Genius: Listening to Mennonites Contest the Modern World, University of Manitoba Press, 2016
- Village Among Nations: 'Canadian' Mennonites in a Transnational World, 1916-2006. University of Toronto Press, 2013
- Seeking Places of Peace: North America; A Global Mennonite History. Good Books, 2012, co-authored by Steven Nolt
- Immigrants in Prairie Cities: A History. University of Toronto Press, 2009, co-authored with Gerald Friesen (winner of the 2010 CHA Clio Prize for Prairie Canada)
- Diaspora in the Countryside: Two Mennonite Communities in Mid-20th Century North America. University of Illinois Press and University of Toronto Press, 2006
- Hidden Worlds: Revisiting the Mennonite Migrants of the 1870s. University of Manitoba Press and Newton, Bethel College, 2001 (finalist for the Margaret McWilliams book prize)
- From the Inside Out: The Rural Worlds of Mennonite Diarists, 1863-1929. University of Manitoba Press, 1999
- Family, Church and Market: A Mennonite Community in the Old and the New Worlds, 1850-1930. University Illinois Press and University Toronto Press, 1993 (winner of the 1995 AHA/CHA Albert Corey Prize)
- Blumenort: A Mennonite Community in Transition, 1874-1983. Blumenort Mennonite Historical Society, 1983 (finalist for the Margaret McWilliams Book Prize)

== Academic reviews of Loewen's works ==
- Seeking Places of Peace: Global Mennonite History Series, North America. Journal of Mennonite Studies. 2013, Vol. 31, p233-235. 3p. Historical Period: ca 1601 to 2012.
- Immigrants in Prairie Cities: Ethnic Diversity in Twentieth-Century Canada. Journal of International Migration & Integration. Aug 2012, Vol. 13 Issue 3, p399-400. 2p. Historical Period: 1901 to 2000. DOI: 10.1007/s12134-011-0204-6.
- Immigrants in Prairie Cities: Ethnic Diversity in Twentieth-Century Canada. H-Net Reviews in the Humanities & Social Sciences. Nov 2011, p1-4. 4p. Historical Period: ca 1910 to ca 2000
- Diaspora in the Countryside: Two Mennonite Communities and Mid-Twentieth-Century Rural Disjuncture. American Historical Review. Jun 2009, Vol. 114 Issue 3, p728-729. 2p. Historical Period: ca 1890 to 1950.
- Diaspora in the Countryside: Two Mennonite Communities and Mid-Twentieth Century Rural Disjuncture. Social History/Histoire Sociale. May 2008, Vol. 41 Issue 81, p293-295. 3p. Historical Period: 1930 to 1989.
- Diaspora in the Countryside: Two Mennonite Communities and Mid-Twentieth-Century Rural Disjuncture. Canadian Historical Review. Sep 2008, Vol. 89 Issue 3, p439-441. 3p. Historical Period: 1930 to 1989
- Hidden Worlds, Revisiting the Mennonite Migrants of the 1870s (Book). Journal of American Ethnic History. Fall 2003, Vol. 23 Issue 1, p124-125. 2p. Historical Period: 1870 to 1879.
- Hidden Worlds (Book). Western Historical Quarterly. Summer2003, Vol. 34 Issue 2, p237. 2p. Historical Period: 1870 to 1879.
- Family, Church and Market: A Mennonite Community in the Old and the New Worlds, 1850-1930. Social History/Histoire Sociale. Nov96, Vol. 29 Issue 58, p509-512. 4p. Historical Period: 1850 to 1930.
