= Eberbach Pax =

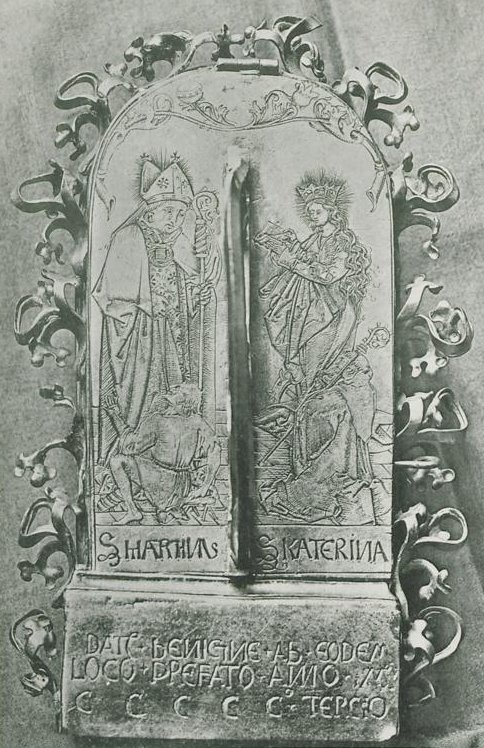
Back of the Eberbach Pax

The Eberbach Pax (German: Eberbacher Kusstafel) is an early Renaissance pax and reliquary from Eberbach Abbey, which is now in the Limburg Cathedral Treasury. The pax was an object used in the Middle Ages and Renaissance for the Kiss of Peace in the Catholic Mass. Direct kissing among the celebrants and congregation was replaced by each in turn kissing the pax, which was carried around those present. The form of the pax was variable but normally included a flat surface to be kissed.

== History ==
The pax was created in the Middle Rhine at the beginning of the sixteenth century. According to an inscription on the pax, the Papal Legate Cardinal Raymond Peraudi gave the pax to Martin Rifflinck, Abbot of Eberbach, in 1503. The pax was also a reliquary, if of a lower grade, since it contained a relief medallion consecrated by Pope Alexander VI, which depicts the Agnus Dei. Each believer who kissed the pax would receive a forty-day indulgence.

In the following years, the pax remained in the Abbey's relic collection. During the Thirty Years War, the Abbey was able to hide it before it was plundered by Swedish troops in 1631.

At the secularisation of the Abbey in 1803, the pax became the property of the Duchy of Nassau. The court sold it to the Frühmesser Müller of Winkel. He gave it to Josephine Brentano. After her death, her husband Anton Theodor Brentano donated the pax to the Bishop of Limburg, Peter Joseph Blum.

Blum left the pax to the Limburg Cathedral treasury, as "Donation of Josephine and Anton Brentano." At this point the pax was restored. The relief medallion of the Agnus Dei had been lost by this point, but it was replaced with a new one, blessed by Pope Pius VIII.

== Description ==
The pax is a 19 x 11.5 cm gilt pax made of beaten silver, with a simple base and a rounded top. The oval medallion of the Agnus Dei is located on the front. This is framed by a crystal above and below and surrounded by quartz crystals. The edge consists of fourteen crockets of Gothic scrollwork. Two saints are engraved on the back. On the left is St Martin of Tours in a bishop's costume with a kneeling beggar. He is balanced on the right by St Catherine with a kneeling abbot. The decoration thus refers closely to the original recipient, Abbot Martin Rifflinck, who shared his name with the former and was especially devoted to the latter. Between the two saints is a hinged handle. The base describes the donation in 1503, using the Antiqua script. On the sides of the base are the arms of the monastery and of Abbot Martin.

== Bibliography ==
- Willy Schmidtt-Lieb, "Künstlerische Impressionen von Kloster Eberbach" in Der Hessische Minister für Landwirtschaft und Forsten, Freundeskreis Kloster Eberbach (Ed.): Eberbach im Rheingau. Zisterzienser – Kultur – Wein. Der Hessische Minister für Landwirtschaft und Forsten, Wiesbaden/Eltville 1986, pp. 161–163.
- Luthmer, Ferdinand (1907). Die Bau- und Kunstdenkmäler des Lahngebiets : Oberlahnkreis, Kreis Limburg, Unterlahnkreis. Frankfurt am Main: Bezirksverband des Regierungsbezirk Wiesbaden. pp. 110–111.
