= Pax (liturgical object) =

Object used in the Middle Ages and Renaissance for the Kiss of Peace in the Catholic Mass

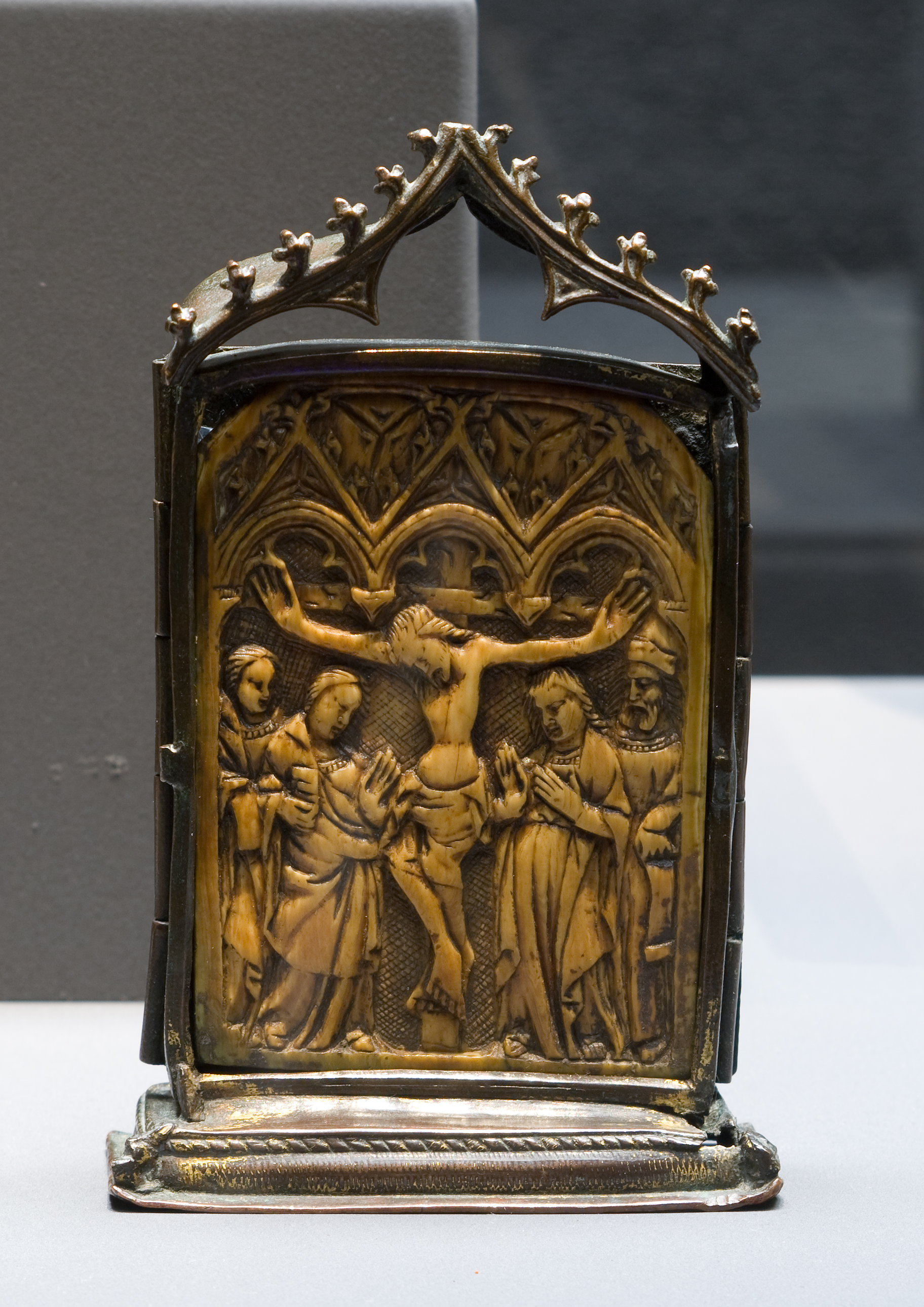
Ivory pax with Crucifixion, Germany or France, 15th century

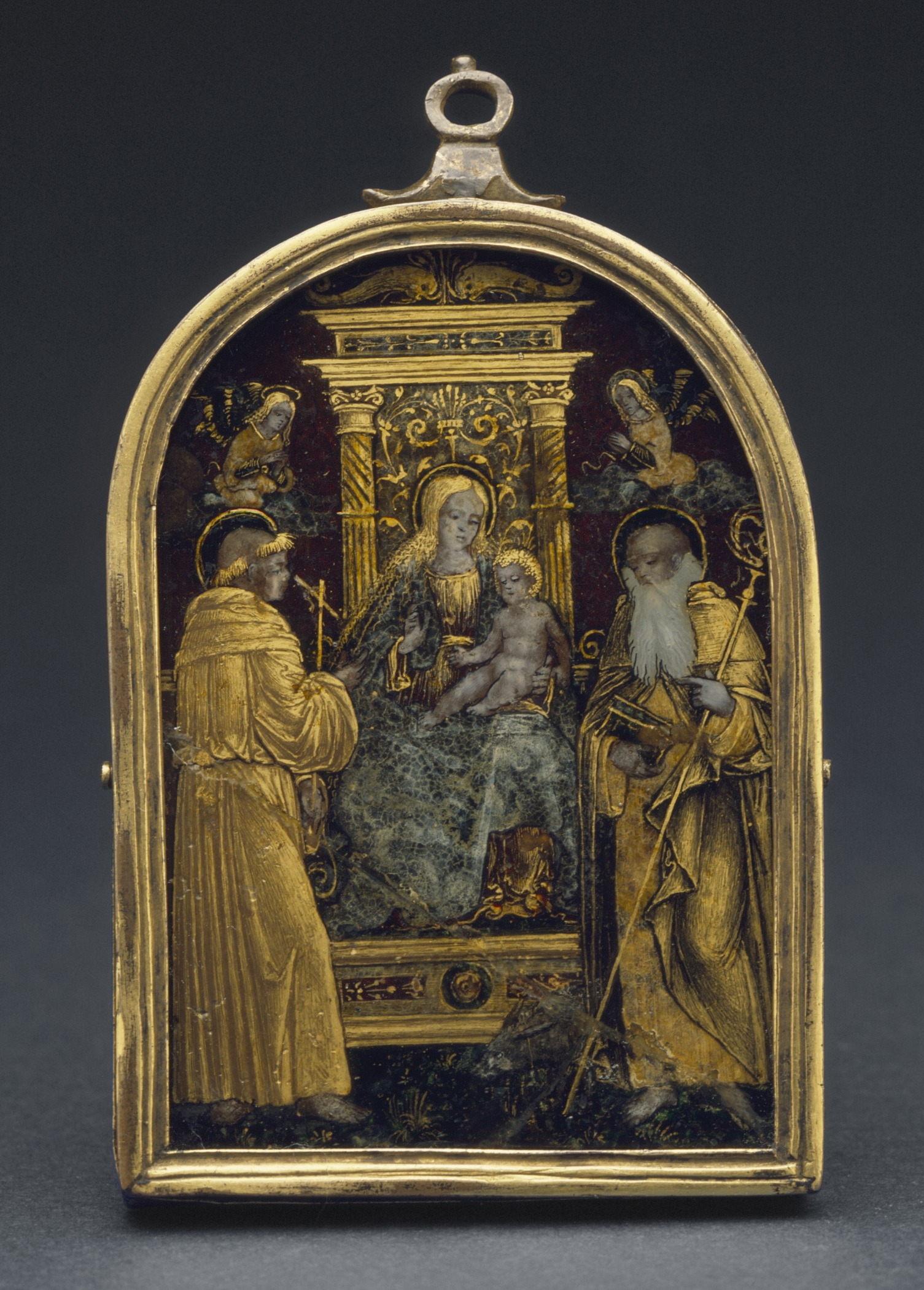
Northern Italy, c. 1480, Glass, paint, gilt, copper, metal foil, 10.16 cm (4.00 in) high

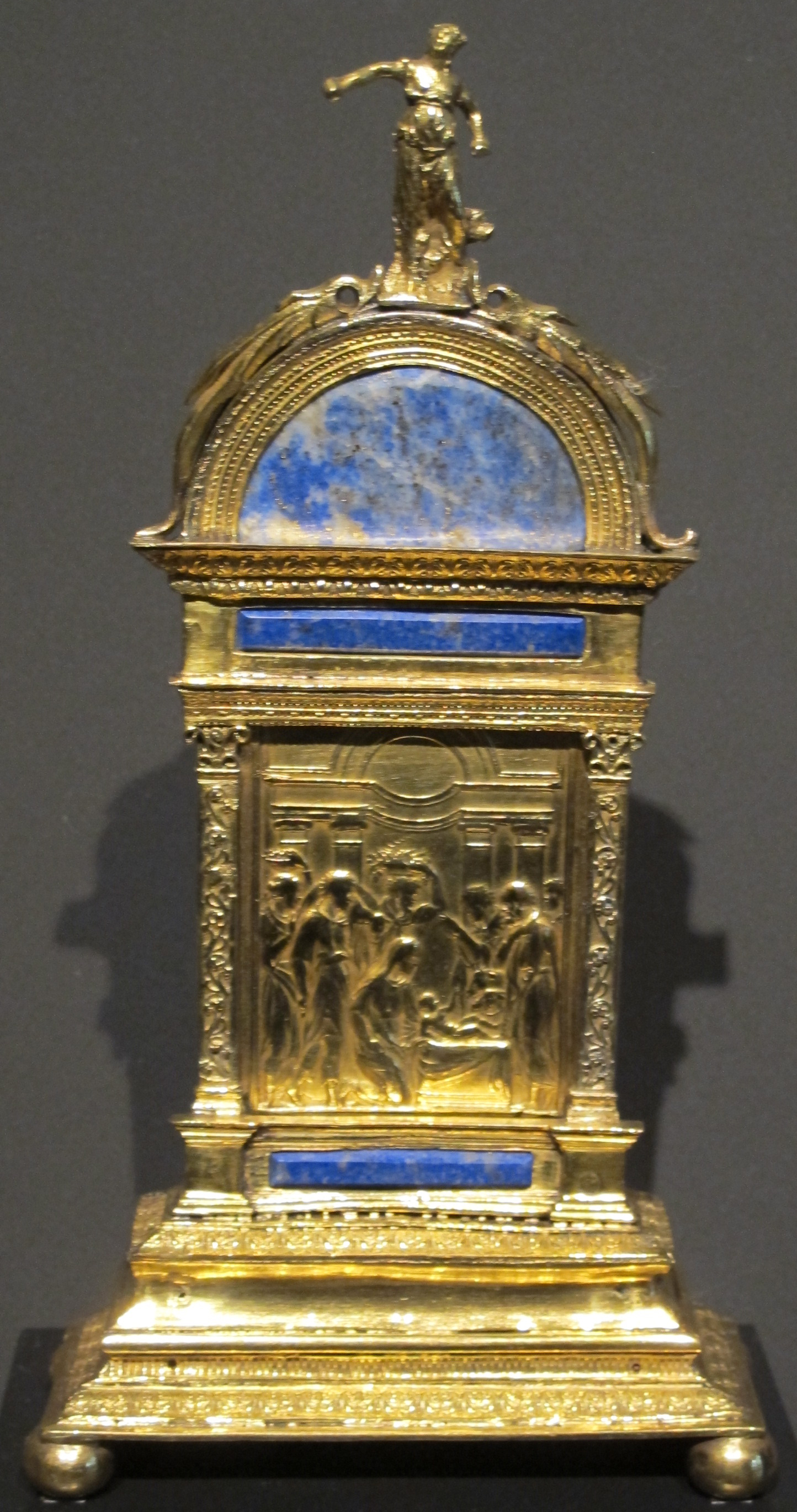
Pax including a plaquette by Valerio Belli, 1520s

The pax or pax board was an object used in the Middle Ages and Renaissance for the kiss of peace in the Catholic Mass. Direct kissing among the celebrants and congregation was replaced by each in turn kissing the pax, which was carried around to those present. A wide range of materials were used, and the form of the pax was also variable but normally included a flat surface to be kissed. Often the pax was held out with a long handle attached, and it seems to have been given a wipe with a cloth between each person. Some paxes are very elaborate and expensive objects, and most survivals fall into this class, but the great majority were probably very simple wood or brass pieces. It was usual to include an image, usually of or including the Virgin Mary or Jesus Christ.

The pax began to replace actual kisses in the 13th century, apparently because of a range of concerns over the sexual, social and medical implications of actual kissing. It is first documented in England, and the 17th-century historian of the Mass, Cardinal Giovanni Bona, associated the introduction with the Franciscan Order. The person holding the pax said "Pax tecum" and received the response "Et cum spiritu tuo" ("Peace to you", "And with your spirit"). The pax gradually fell out of general use, though the Catholic Encyclopedia in 1911 said it was still practised when "prelates and princes" were involved, but "not to others except in rare cases established by custom". In the 20th century the physical kiss, now more often a handshake, was revived in the Mass (though reduced in practice again during the COVID pandemic).

Pax was the Latin name, with osculatorium, osculum pacis and instrumentum pacis as alternatives. Pax was also used in English, in which they were also called a pax board and pax-brede, or paxbrede. Another Latin term was pacificale, still sometimes used in Italian and German. The modern term pax tablet may be used, especially by church historians, where art historians mostly favour pax. (Note: Harvey uses pax board; Duffy and museums such as the Walters Art Museum, source of most of the images here, use pax.) Osculatory is used in some 19th-century sources, and some claim that this refers to a pendant form, worn round the neck by the priest. This does not appear in most modern scholarship, though given a one-line entry by Oxford Art Online. Translators unfamiliar with the concept may introduce still further names into English. Kusstafel ('kiss-board') is one of the German names.

== History ==
The kiss of peace was included in the Mass of the Western Church from the 2nd century at least, and the Eastern Church had its equivalent. The kiss was only supposed to be exchanged between members of the same sex, but numerous references to inter-sex kissing show that this continued to be a possibility. An exception to this was the Nuptial Mass for weddings, where the priest kissed the bridegroom, who then kissed the bride. Other exceptions were masses in the days before Easter, when the association with the treacherous kiss of Judas might be too strong, and the kiss of peace was omitted entirely.

The pax board, as a substitute for the kiss of peace, is first mentioned in 1248 in the statutes of the Archbishop of York, and seems to have been an English invention, perhaps restricted to England until the next century. The statutes of a synod of the Diocese of Exeter in 1287, and an inventory of Saint Paul's Cathedral in London of 1297 provide the next mentions. By 1328 the post-mortem inventory of the possessions of Queen Clementia of Hungary, widow of King Louis X of France, included "ung portepais d'argent" ('a silver pax').

Early texts of the major work Rationale divinorum officiorum by Guillaume Durand, Bishop of Mende in southern France, which was circulating from 1286, do not mention the pax. However, the first vernacular translation, in French from 1382, has an inserted mention of "la paix porter". A synod in Prague in 1355 is the first mention from the Holy Roman Empire; the synod recommended that the pax should be introduced if congregations were reluctant to exchange actual kisses. Other evidence, including surviving paxes, shows it spread at least to Italy, Germany and Spain, and was probably standard in Western European churches by the Reformation.

In Protestantism the pax, and all thought of actual kisses, was abandoned as useless and undesirable symbolic distractions from faith, although the pax was not singled out for much special disparagement in Protestant polemics, with the exception of Richard Baxter, who gave it among a list of other irrational violations of the Second Commandment, saying:

To worship God as the papists do, with images, Agnus Dei's, crucifixes, crossings, spittle, oil, candles, holy water, kissing the pax, dropping beads, praying to the Virgin Mary, and to other saints, repeating over the name of Jesus nine times in a breath, and saying such and such sentences so oft, praying to God in an unknown tongue, and saying to him they know not what, adoring the consecrated bread as no bread, but the very flesh of Christ himself, choosing the titular saint whose name they will invocate, fasting by feasting upon fish instead of flesh, saying so many masses a day, and offering sacrifice for the quick and the dead, praying for souls in purgatory, purchasing indulgences for their deliverance out of purgatory from the pope, carrying the pretended bones or other relics of their saints, the pope's canonizing now and then one for a saint, pretending miracles to delude the people, going on pilgrimages to images, shrines, or relics, offering before the images, with a multitude more of such parcels of devotion, do most heinously dishonour God, and, as the apostle truly saith, do make unbelievers say, "They are mad," (1 Cor. 14:23), and that they are "children in understanding," and not "men," (1 Cor. 14:20).

Another exception were the Anabaptists, who instead kissed on meeting both in normal life and at services; this only stiffened the disdain felt by other Protestants.

By about 1600 the use of the kiss of peace had declined and changed in Catholic practice as well. No longer regarded as a general ceremony of reconciliation, but as one of greeting those deserving honour, it was now restricted to the clergy and the choir, as well as magistrates and male nobility. It was performed at the beginning of High Mass, whereas the pax board had previously been more often associated with the less ceremonial Low Mass. According to the Oratorian liturgical historian Father Pierre Lebrun (1661–1729), the decline in Catholic use was because of the disputes over precedence that it caused.

Another factor may have been that kissing the pax had clearly come to act as a substitute for receiving the Eucharist for many of the faithful, avoiding the need for fasting and other prescribed preparations for Holy Communion.

In modern Catholicism use of the pax is confined to a few religious orders, such as the Dominicans, and individual churches.

== Cause of disputes ==
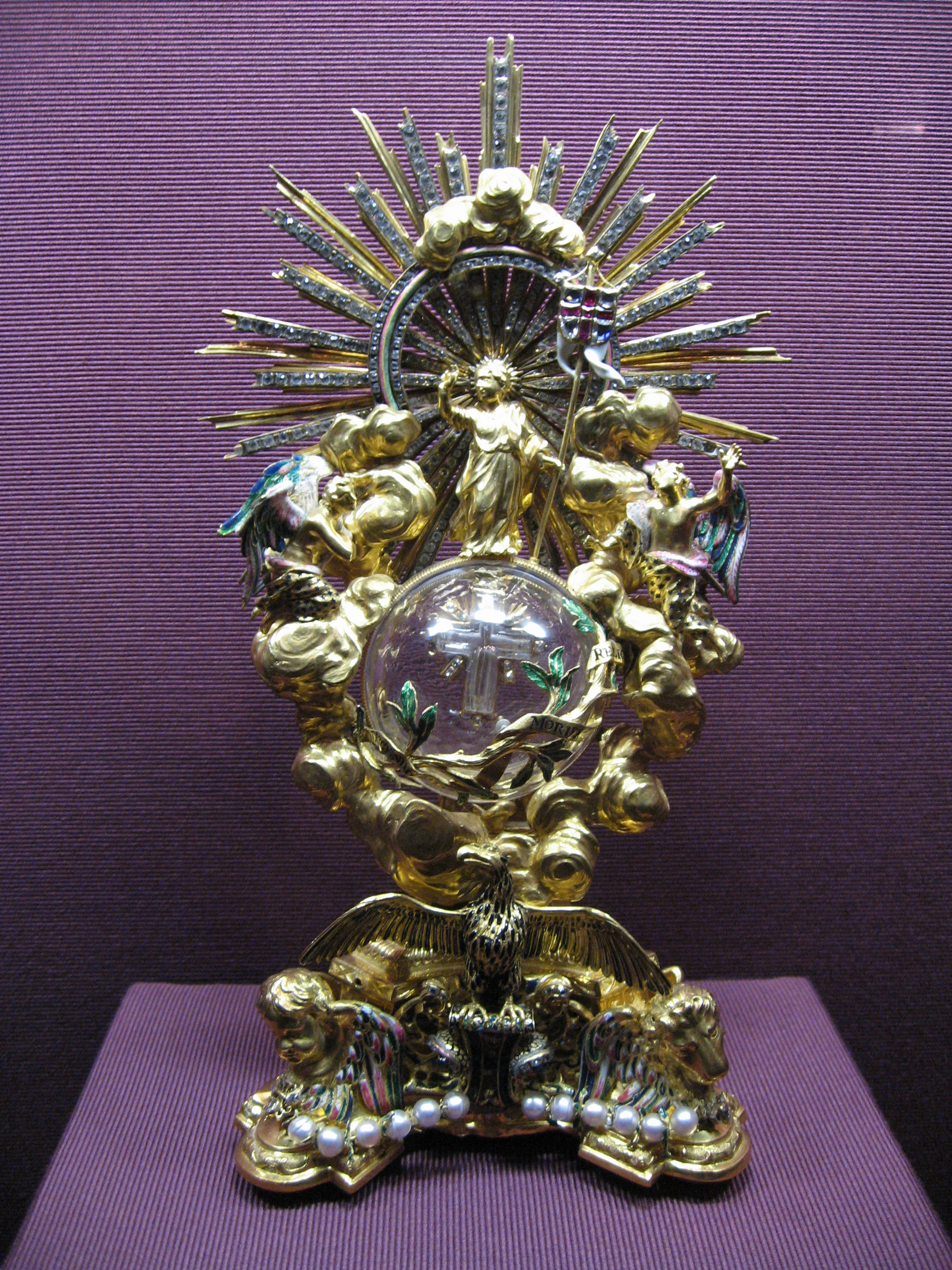
Rococo pax of 1726, for the Imperial Chapel of the Hofburg Palace in Vienna; by this time paxes were largely out of use in ordinary churches

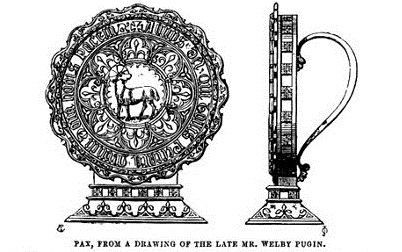
Design for a pax by E.W. Pugin (d. 1875), showing its handle

As earlier with the actual kiss, the pax was often the cause of bad feeling and sometimes actual violence because the order in which it was kissed, descending down the religious and social hierarchy, gave rise to disputes over precedence. Geoffrey Chaucer in The Parson's Tale from his Canterbury Tales, wrote:

And yet is there a private species of Pride that waits first to be greeted ere he will greet, although he is less worthy than that other is, indeed; and also he expects or desires to sit, or else to go before him in the way, or kiss the pax, or be incensed, or go to the offering before his neighbor, and such similar things, beyond what duty requires, indeed, but that he has his heart and his intent in such a proud desire to be made much of and honored before the people.

In The Wife of Bath's Tale Chaucer makes it clear that she was just such a person. Christine de Pisan complained of such behaviour, among women in particular, pointing out that the pax "is for the little people as much as the big ones". She recommended just hanging the pax on the wall of the church "on a nail and let whoever wants to kiss it do so". This was actually recommended by a synod in Seville in 1512, which said the pax should be fixed rather than carried round the church. Thomas More also complained that "men fall at variance for kissing of the pax".

The historian Eamon Duffy in his The Stripping of the Altars recounts that:

In 1494 the wardens of the parish of All Saints, Stanyng, presented Joanna Dyaca for breaking the paxbrede by throwing it on the ground, "because another woman of the parish had kissed it before her." On All Saints Day 1522 Master John Browne of the parish of Theydon-Garnon in Essex, having kissed the pax-brede at the parish Mass, smashed it over the head of Richard Pond, the holy-water clerk who had tendered it to him, "causing streams of blood to run to the ground." Brown was enraged because the pax had first been offered to Francis Hamden and his wife Margery, despite the fact that the previous Sunday he had warned Pond, "Clerke, if thou here after givest not me the pax first I shall breke it on thy hedd."

On the other hand, a "ribald carol" where a female narrator recounts various flirtatious advances made at mass includes the verse:

"Jankin at the Agnus bered the pax-brede;
He twinkled but said nout, and on my fot he trede

Kyrieleison"

== As art ==
Paxes with elaborate metalwork framing an image in a medium that would withstand kissing and wiping are the sort that have been most likely to survive. Other objects that might seem to have had another purpose, such as plaquettes, ivory panels or small painted enamel plaques, may have been made for a pax. Equally other objects began life as serving some other purpose, and were turned into paxes. Some still have a metal fitting at the rear, either a handle or a slot for a long wooden handle to fit into, of which a few have survived. Glass or rock crystal over an image below allowed the image to be kissed repeatedly but not damaged, and enamel also wore relatively well. Carved shell and mother of pearl are sometimes used. Even with a frame paxes are usually less than a foot high, and the images often 4 to 6 inches (100 to 150 mm) high. The inventory of the royal treasure of King Richard II of England lists many paxes among its nearly 1,200 items, including two of plain ungilded silver with red crosses, which Jenny Stratford suggests were for use in Lent. Several record who gave them, or from whom they were seized for offences.

As a type of object that was not quite considered of top importance, the compositions in pax images were very often recycled from another medium such as prints or plaquettes. Gilt-copper is more common than gold in the surrounds, and gems were likely to be glass-paste. However, this is also partly an accident of survival; many paxes were made purely of a single piece of silver, with the image in relief or engraved, but these have rarely survived. If not melted down by the church for funds they were often confiscated by the civil authorities in the late Ancien Régime and Napoleonic period, when a distinction was often made between essential church plate such as chalices and candlesticks, which the church was allowed to keep, and inessential items such as paxes, by then probably no longer in use, which were confiscated. Still more common were copper alloy (brass or bronze) pieces, which were mass-produced (in medieval terms) in late medieval England, though very few have survived. These were cast in one piece, with the image either in the mould or engraved later, and with very similar designs, suggesting the use of pattern books or other models. Some paxes doubled as reliquaries, such as the Eberbach Pax, though this contained the lowest sort of "contact relic", a medallion blessed by the pope.

From inventories and other records, it is known that churches very often had two or more paxes, distinguishing between the best, for feast-days and probably typically of metal, and "ferial" or everyday ones, probably often in wood. Many churches also had pairs of paxes, one used on each side of the central aisle. A rare medieval wood pax was found under floorboards in a cottage near the church at Sandon, Essex in 1910. Dating to about 1500, it has a painted watercolour on vellum Crucifixion set in a wood frame, once gilded. Only extra space below the image, and traces of a handle fitting on the back, make its purpose clear. Surviving medieval English paxes include only two examples each in silver and wood. New College, Oxford has one of the silver ones, of about 1520, with gilded figures in its Crucifixion, and engraving probably by a foreign goldsmith in London. The Victoria and Albert Museum has an English recusant example in engraved silver from around 1640.

English documentary records during the English Reformation, and especially the brief restoration of Catholic practices in the reign of Mary I of England, record a variety of forms of pax, including some in the 1550s that are clearly improvisations replacing the objects confiscated earlier. In one parish a mass-book with a treasure binding was used, at others a small shield with a gentleman's coat of arms on, and an object showing "a nakyd man with the xij sighnes aboute him".

== Gallery ==
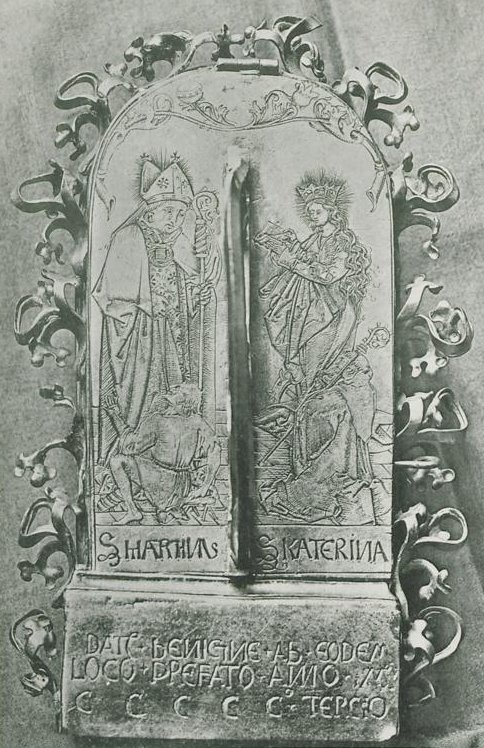
Rear of the German 15th-century Eberbach Pax, with handle and engraved saints

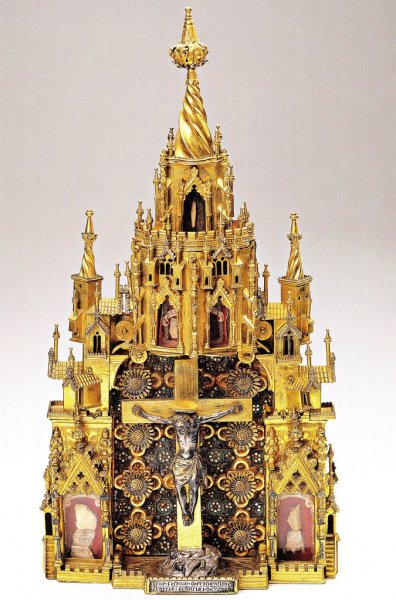
Unusually fancy North Italian pax, including relics, 1434, Trento Cathedral, 33 cm (13 in) high

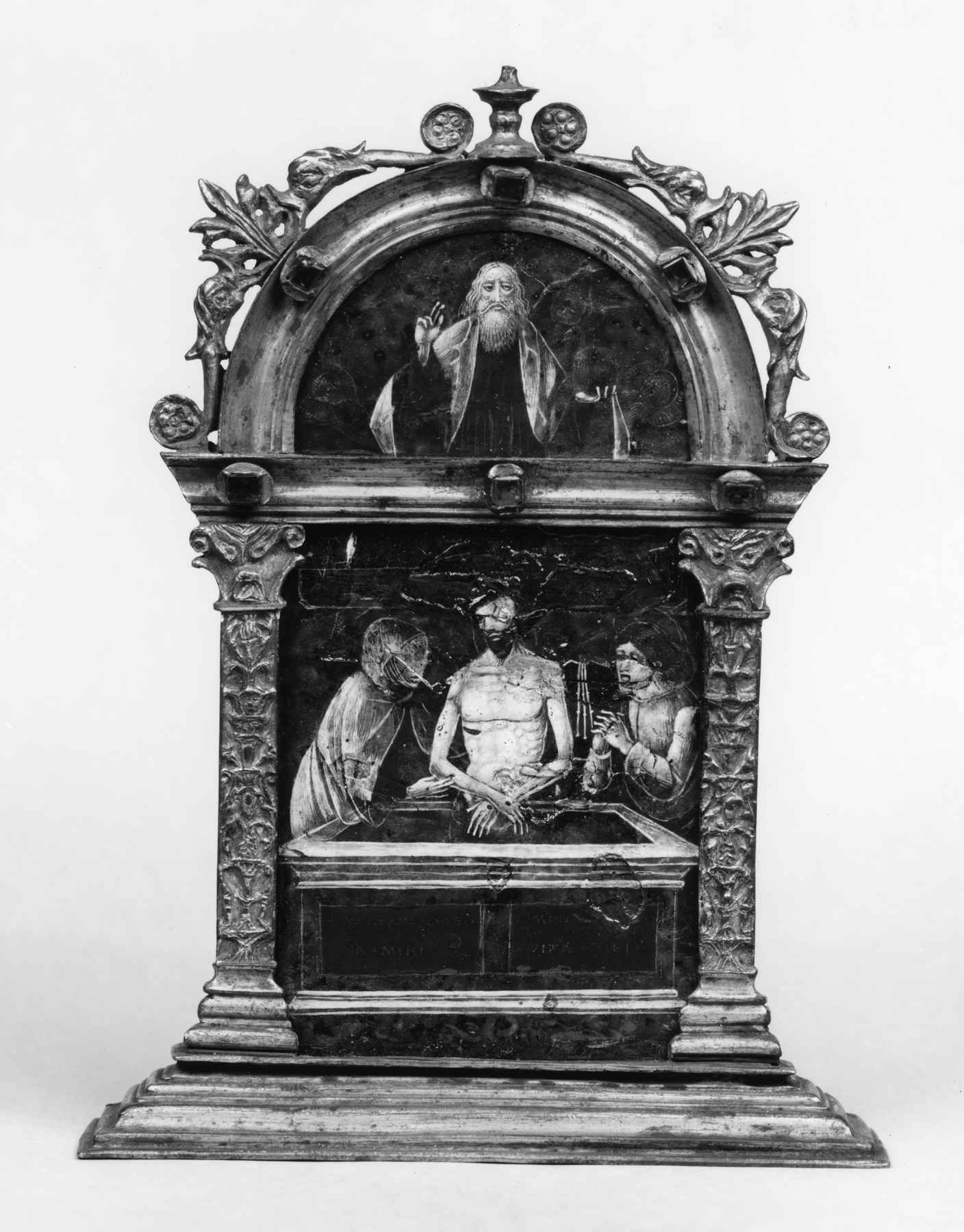
Italian, c. 1500 with Christ as the Man of Sorrows, 18 cm (7.1 in) high

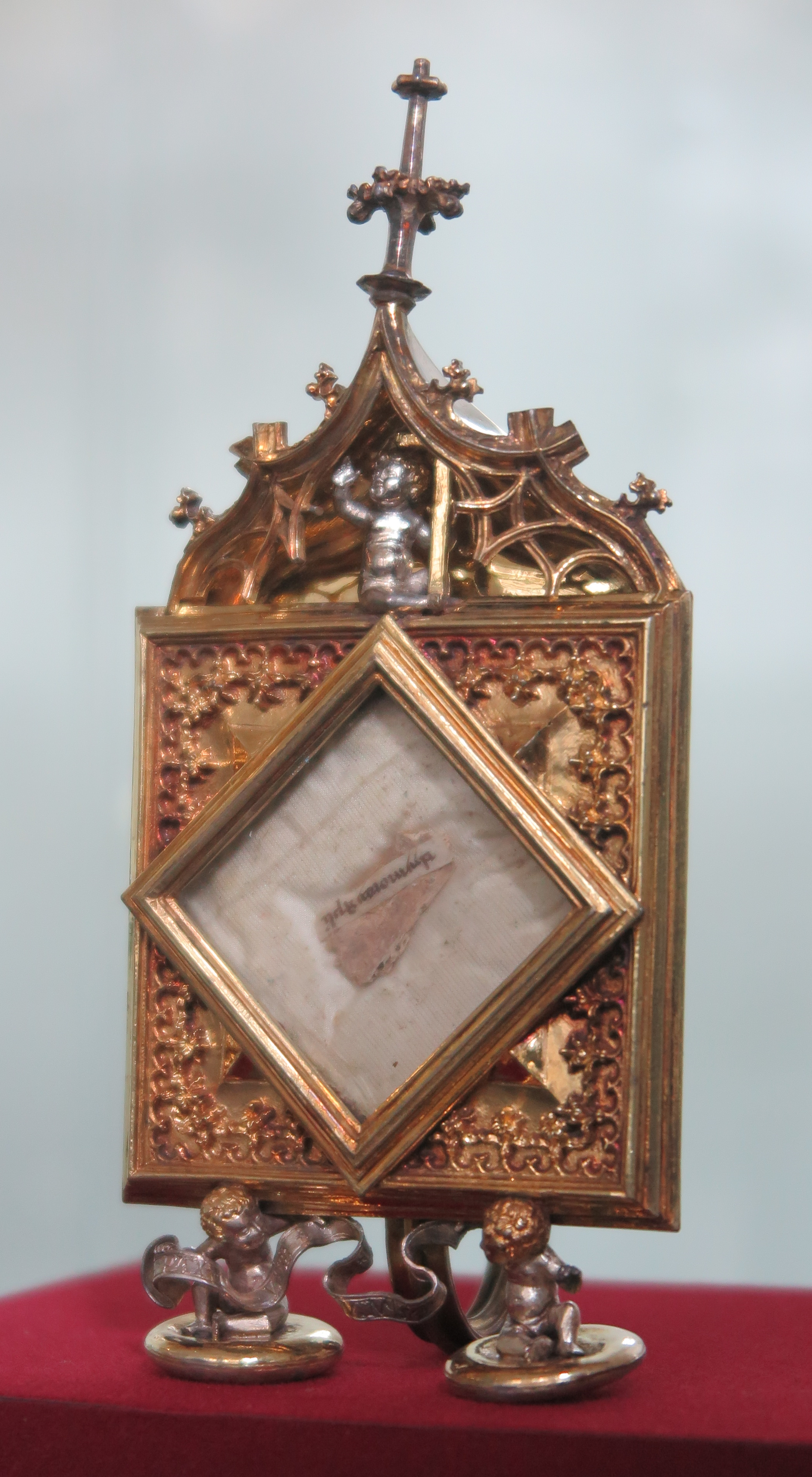
German Late Gothic pax with a relic under glass or crystal, c. 1500

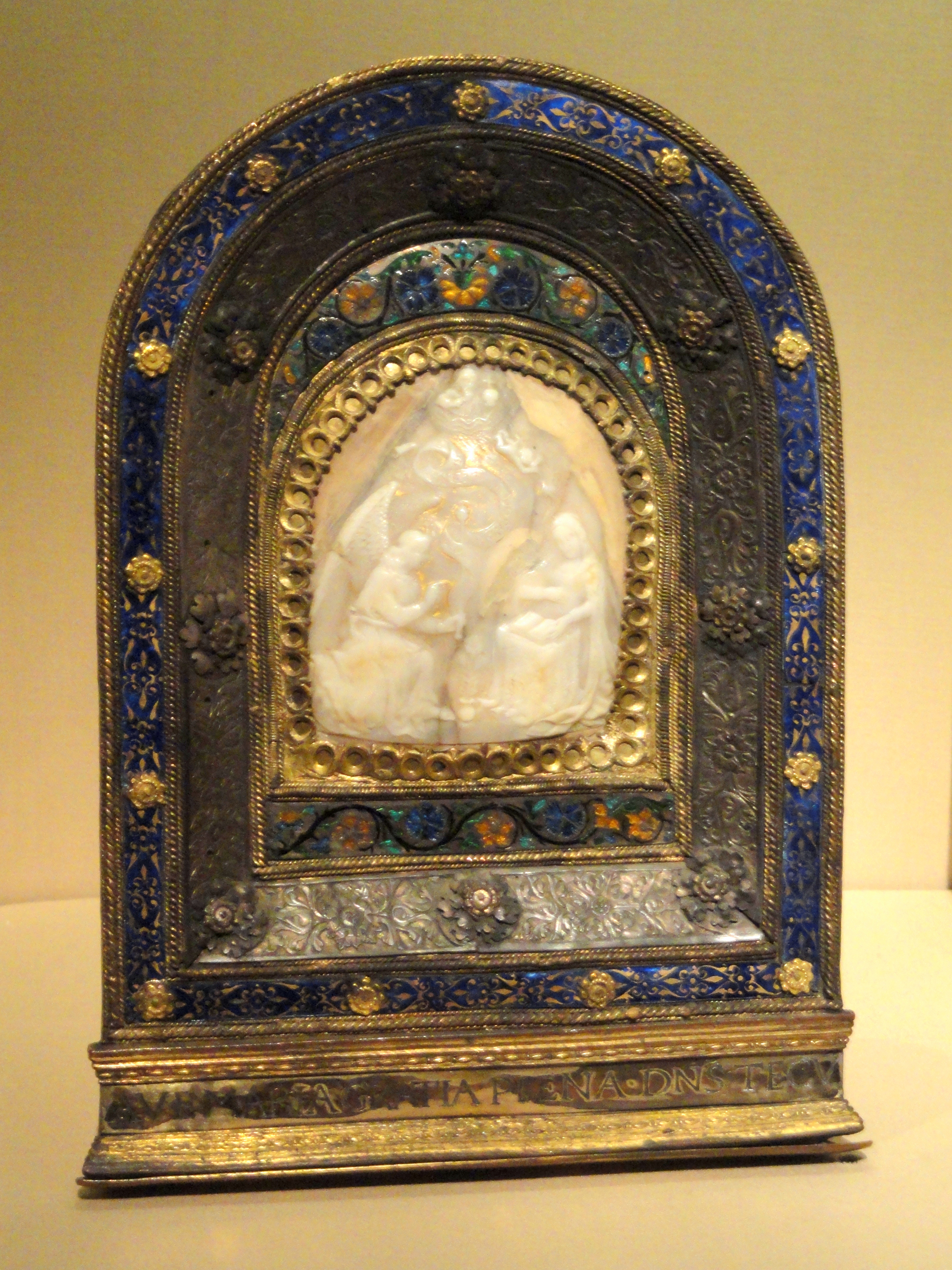
Pax with the Annunciation in shell cameo, gilded silver, copper, enamel. German or Netherlandish shell carving (c. 1500), setting probably Italian (c. 1500–1520)

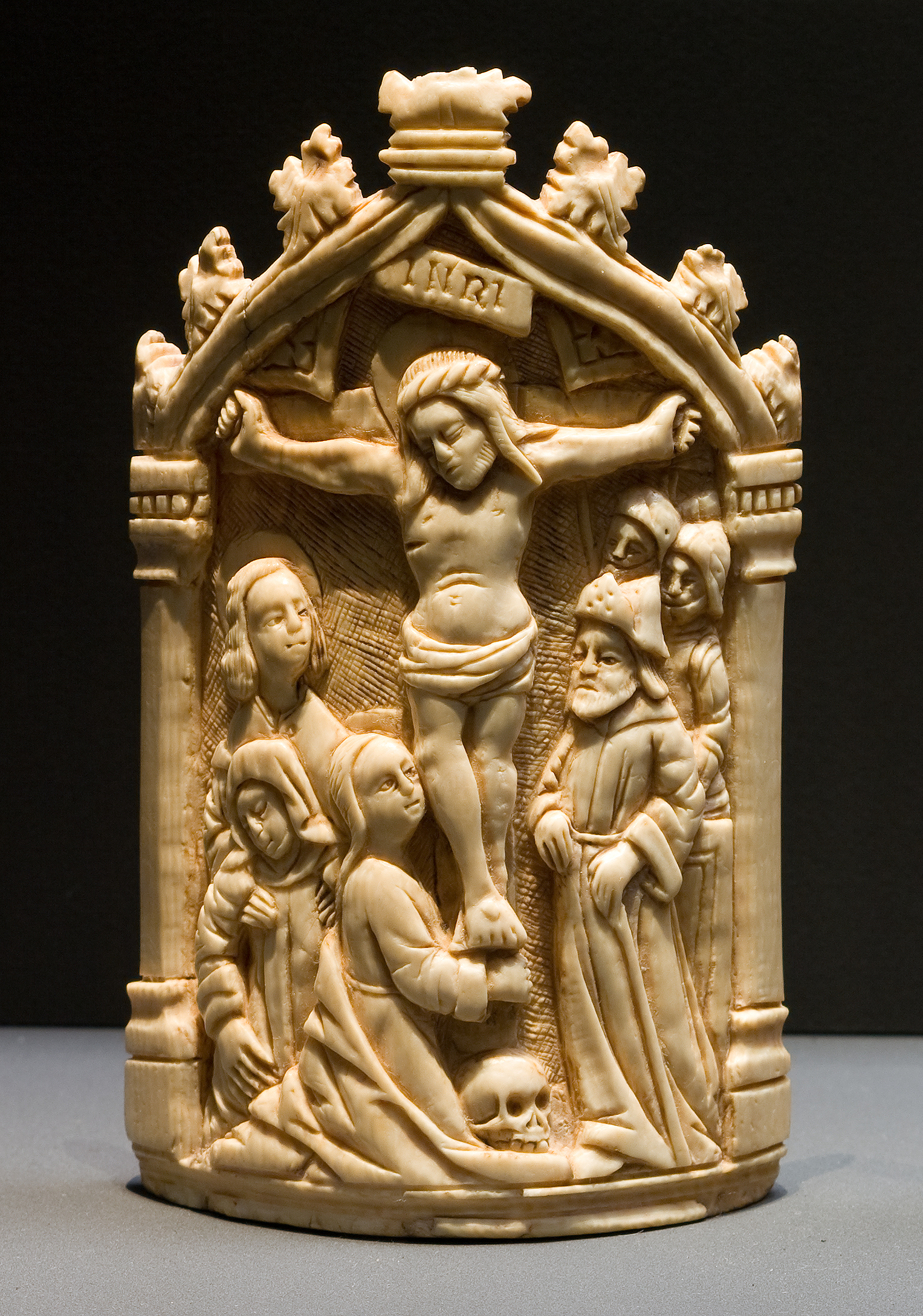
Ivory pax with Crucifixion, Netherlandish, 1500–10

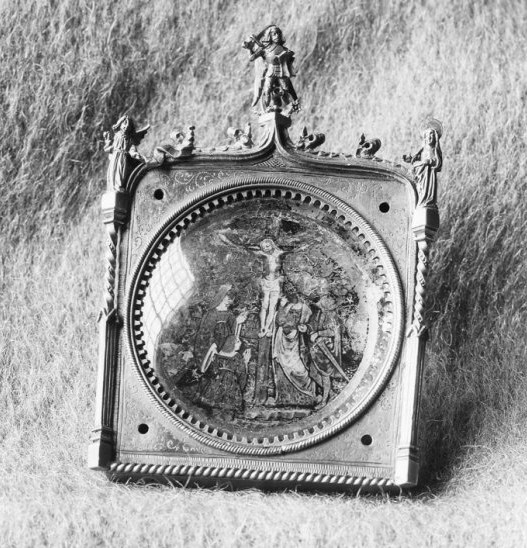
Late Gothic pax from Maastricht, the image under crystal or glass

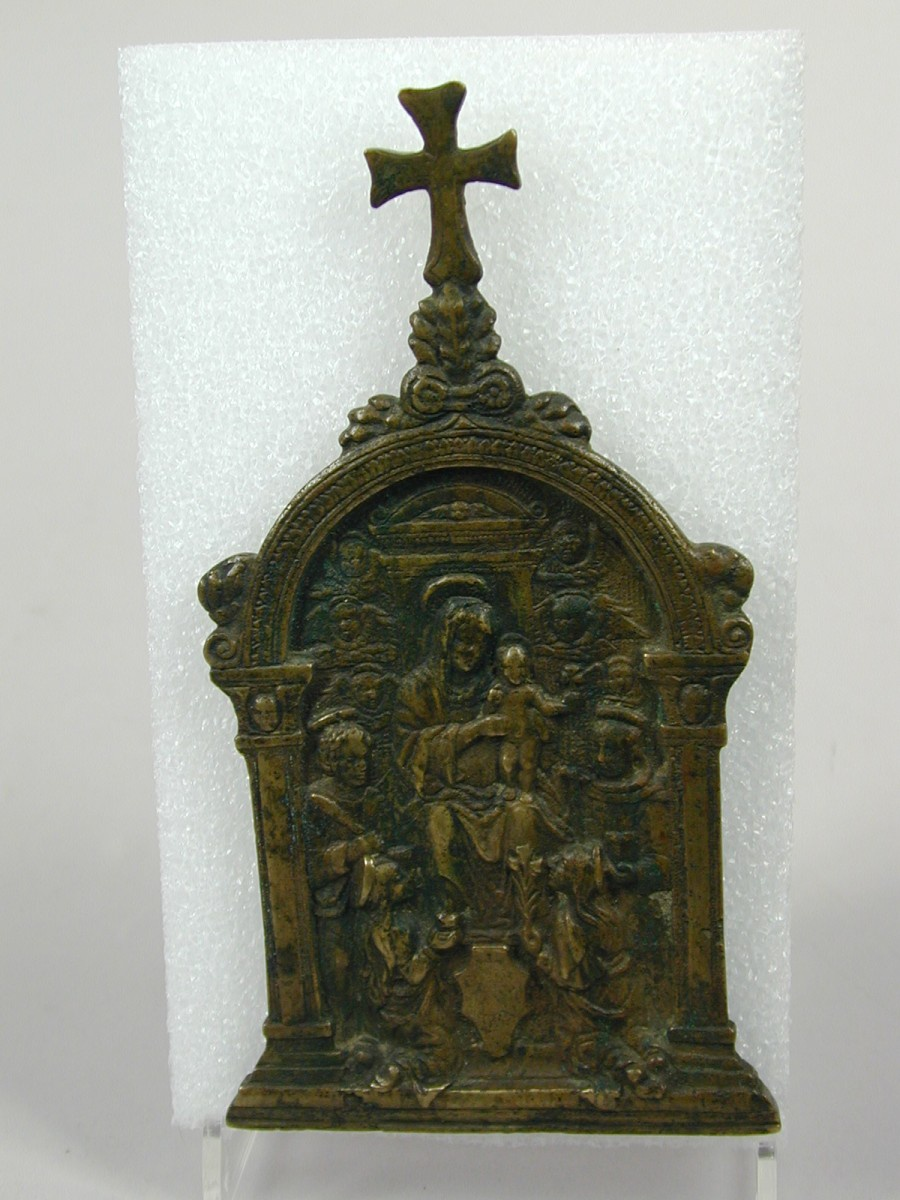
16th-century cast copper pax, Italian

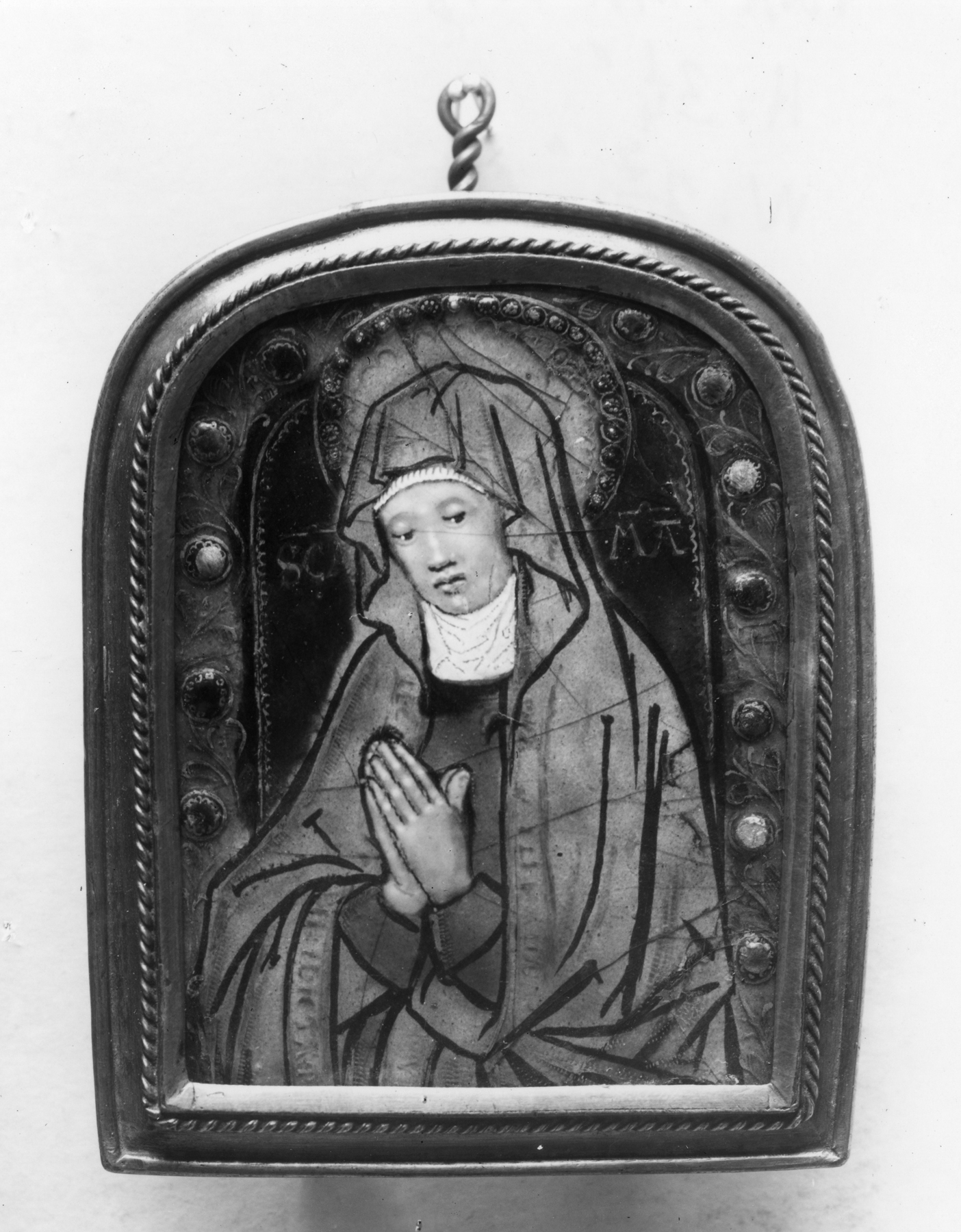
Painted Limoges enamel, 1520-40 by Nardon Pénicaud, 8.3 cm (3.3 in) high

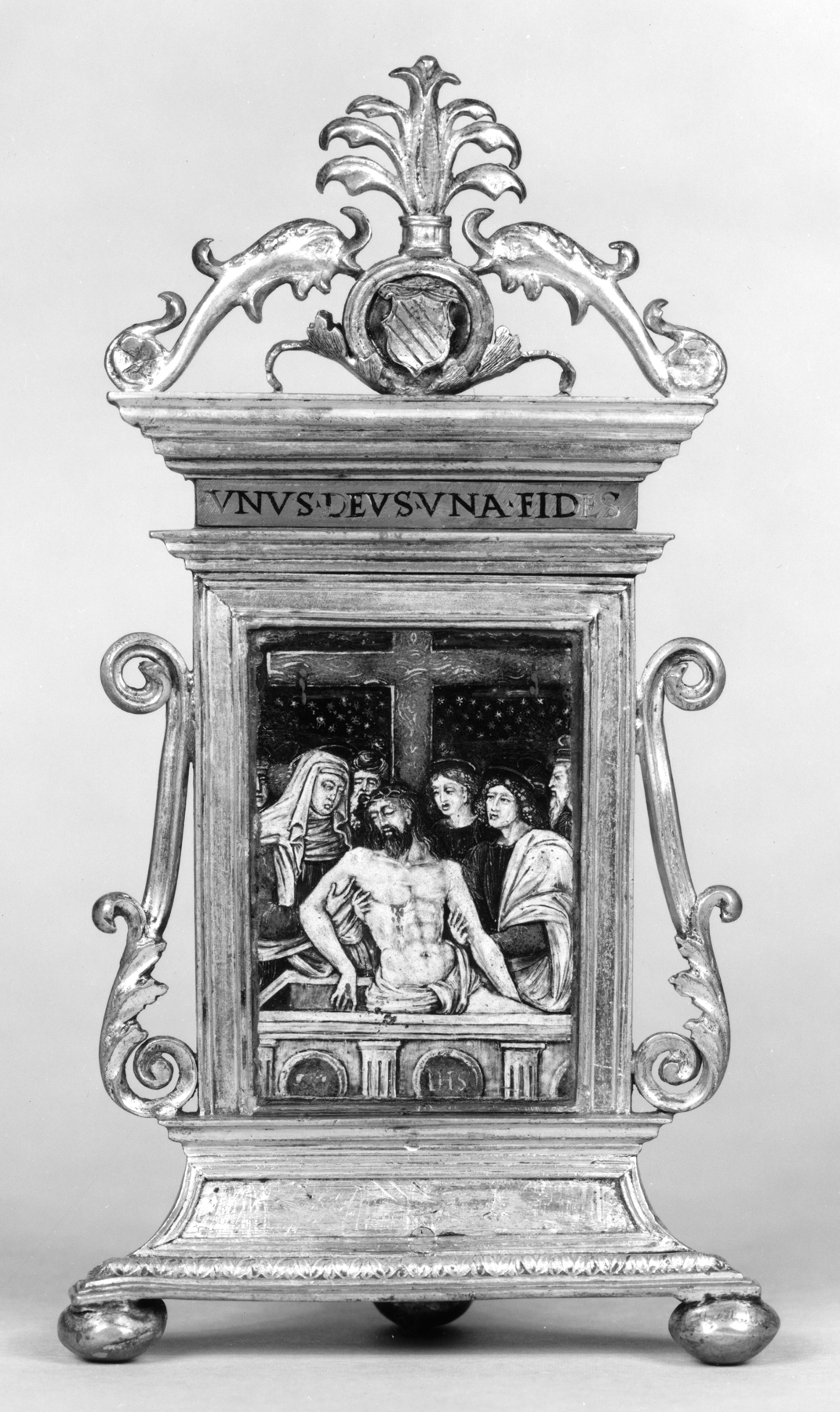
Italian, painted enamel and gilt-copper frame, early 16th century. The main image after a plaquette. 19 cm (7.5 in) high

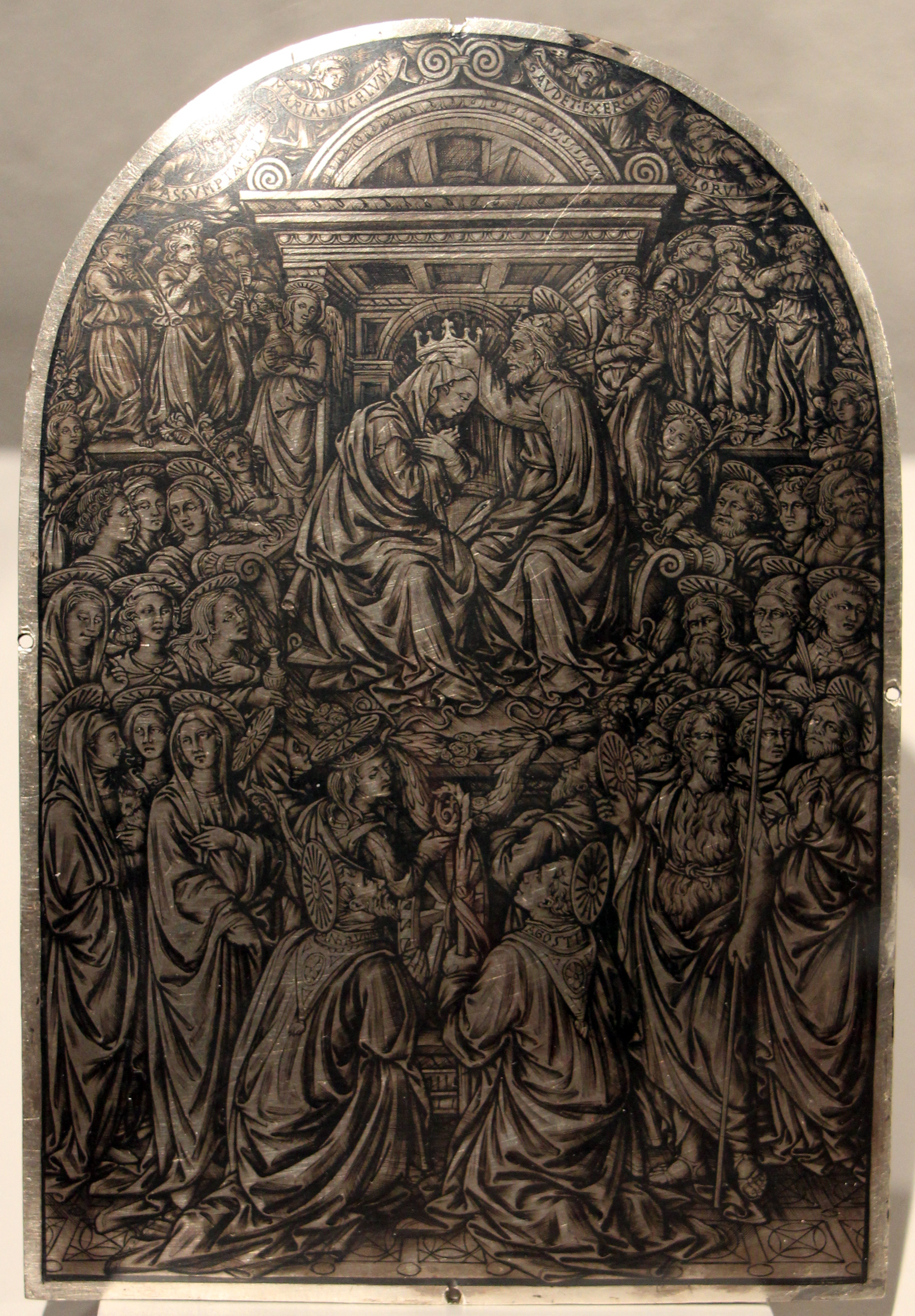
Coronation of the Virgin, niello by Maso Finiguerra, Florence, 1452, now Bargello

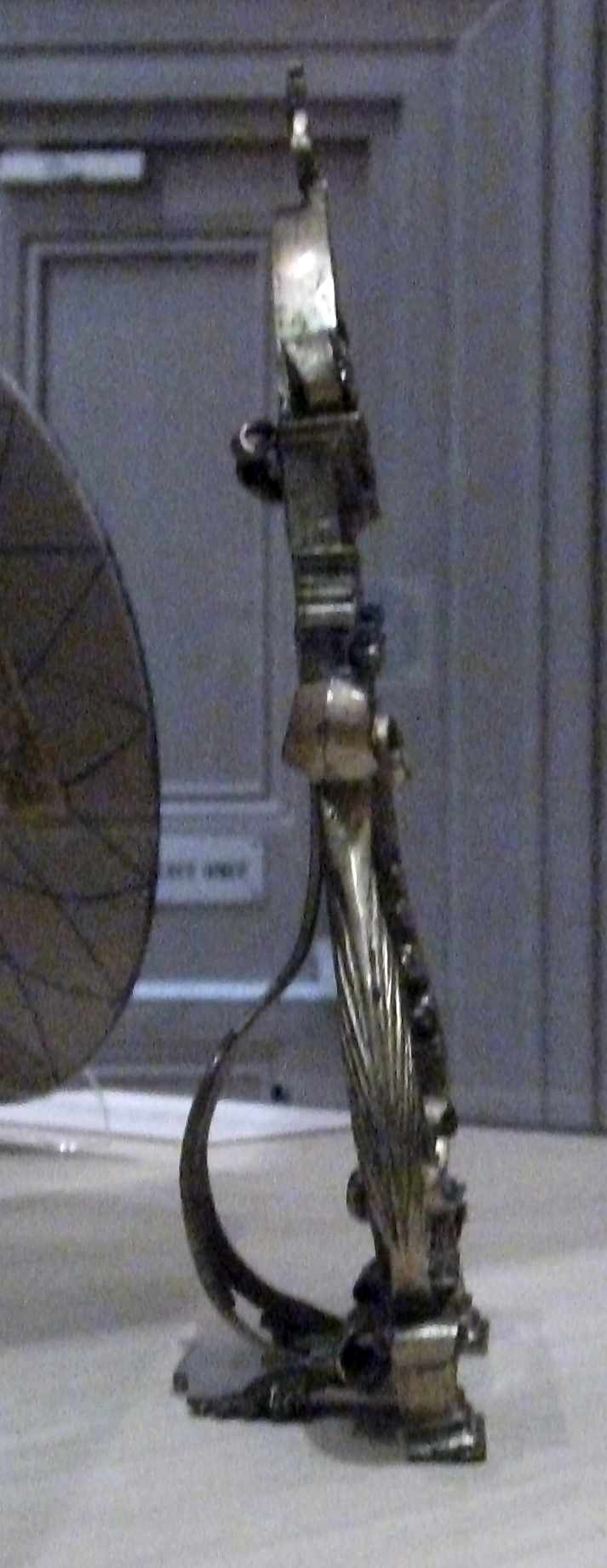
Side view of a pax showing the handle

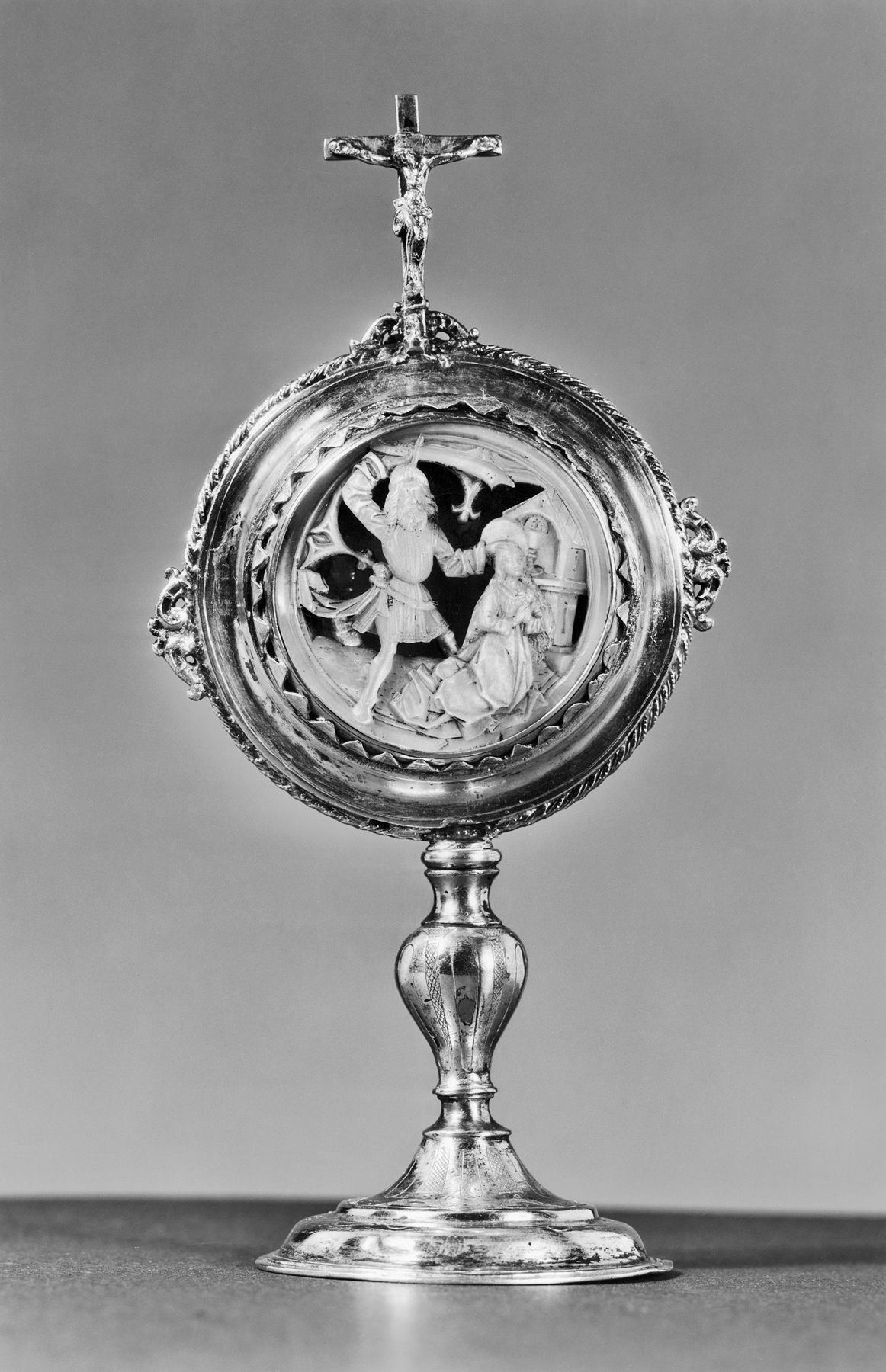
Mother of pearl medallion, after a print by Master E.S., c. 1480, mounted in silver as a pax in 17th century

== Bibliography ==
- Jonathan Alexander & Paul Binski (eds), Age of Chivalry, Art in Plantagenet England, 1200–1400, Royal Academy/Weidenfeld & Nicolson, London 1987
- "CE" = "Pax." The Catholic Encyclopedia. Vol. 11. New York: Robert Appleton Company, 1911. accessed 30 May 2015 online
- Duffy, Eamon, The Stripping of the Altars, 1996, Yale UP, Google Books
- Harvey, Karen, The Kiss in History, 2005, Manchester University Press, ISBN 071906595X, 9780719065958
- Kuhn, Sherman M., Middle English Dictionary, Part 2, 1982, University of Michigan Press, ISBN 0472011626, 9780472011629, Google Books
- Mantello, Frank Anthony Carl and Rigg, A. G., Medieval Latin: An Introduction and Bibliographical Guide, 1996, CUA Press, ISBN 0813208424, 9780813208428
- Marks, Richard and Williamson, Paul, eds. Gothic: Art for England 1400–1547, 2003, V&A Publications, London, ISBN 1851774017
- "Oxford" = "Pax", The Oxford Dictionary of Christian Art and Architecture, Authors: Tom Devonshire Jones, Linda Murray, Peter Murray, 2013, OUP Oxford, ISBN 0199680272, 9780199680276
- Senn, Frank C., The People's Work: A Social History of the Liturgy, 2010, Fortress Press, ISBN 1451408013, 9781451408010, Google Books
- Stratford, Jenny, Richard II and the English Royal Treasure, 2012, Boydell Press, ISBN 1843833786, 9781843833789
- Baxter, Richard, "A Christian Directory, Part 1: Christian Ethics", 17th century, ISBN 9355347324, 9789355347329, 546
