= John Holdeman =

American Mennonite preacher (1832–1900)

John Holdeman (January 31, 1832 - March 10, 1900) was an American preacher and the most well-known founder of the Church of God in Christ, Mennonite, also known in certain areas as the Holdeman Mennonite Church.

Holdeman was born in Wayne County, Ohio in 1832 to Amos and Nancy (Yoder) Holdeman. He married Elizabeth Ritter in 1852. He began preaching in 1858 and drew a large following in Kansas. He preached across the United States and Canada throughout his lifetime. In 1881, many members of another Mennonite denomination, the Kleine Gemeinde, which had originated in the Russian Empire, joined the CGCM, which they believed to be the true Church of God. Holdeman died suddenly in 1900 at the age of 68.

Because he was bilingual (German and English), an avid reader, well-traveled and more broadly informed than many fellow Mennonites; because he came from Mennonite moorings, sympathetic to the feelings which the rejected felt, and appropriately accepting of some of the "new ways" (e.g., revivalism, publishing, etc.) he was uniquely suited to make an impact.

He wrote extensively, and edited the Botschafter der Wahrheit from June 1897 until his death. His published works included: The old ground and foundation (both German (1862) and English (1863); A reply to the criticisms of John Roseborough (1864); Eine Vertheidigung gegen die Verfälscher unserer Schriften (1865); A history of the Church of God (German (1875) and English (1876); A treatise on redemption, baptism, and the Passover and the Lord's Supper (1890); A treatise on magistracy and war, millennium, holiness, and the manifestation of spirits (1891); Eine gründliche Abhandlung von dem schriftwidrigen Entstehen der Siebenten Tag Adventisten und ihrer unevangelischen Lehre (1892); Ein Aufsatz von Unmöglichkeiten (1893); and his major work, Ein Spiegel der Wahrheit (1878; English, 1956).
