= Church of God in Christ, Mennonite =

Christian Church of Anabaptist heritage

The Church of God in Christ, Mennonite
- Classification: Anabaptist
- Theology: Mennonite
- Region: United States, Canada
- Founder: John Holdeman (1832–1900)
- Origin: 1859; 167 years ago
- Separated from: Conservative Mennonite
- Congregations: 138 (2009)
- Members: 27,118 (2021)
- Official website: churchofgodinchristmennonite.net

The Church of God in Christ, Mennonite, also called Holdeman Mennonite, is a Christian Church of Anabaptist heritage. A man named John Holdeman (1832–1900), who was a baptized Mennonite, was instrumental in establishing the church in 1859. The Church of God in Christ, Mennonite is Conservative Mennonite and is different from other Conservative Mennonites because of its one true church doctrine. In 2021, the church had approximately 27,118 baptized members.

== History ==
=== Origins ===
The congregations of the Church of God in Christ, Mennonite are descendants of the Anabaptists of the 16th century. Under the influential work of Menno Simons, many of the Anabaptists became known as Mennonites. Holdeman Mennonites recognize the faith of the Waldenses and other nonconformist groups of the Middle Ages as part of their spiritual heritage and see a direct lineage through them to the Early Church. They believe that "Christ established one true, visible Church, and through her He has preserved His faith and doctrine through the ages."

=== John Holdeman ===
In the mid-19th century, some American Mennonites believed they saw in their church a spiritual decline and drift away from sound doctrine, and sought to "earnestly contend for the faith which was once delivered unto the saints". Among these was John Holdeman (1832–1900), who was born in Wayne County, Ohio, to Mennonite parents. John's father, Amos Holdeman, was interested in the revivalist movement of John Winebrenner, the Churches of God General Conference. John Holdeman became both an evangelist and a reformer. Issues he believed needed reform included the baptism of persons not giving sufficient evidence of conversion, less than diligent child training, and laxity of church discipline. Holdeman and other concerned individuals began holding separate meetings in April 1859, resulting in a permanent separation from the Mennonite church and the eventual organization of the Church of God in Christ, Mennonite. Holdeman wrote extensively and traveled widely, and new congregations were formed in the United States and Canada.

=== The coming of the Mennonites from Russia ===
The spread of the Church of God in Christ, Mennonite among other Mennonites and among the Amish was minimal until the arrival of Mennonite immigrants from the Russian Empire (present-day Ukraine), so called 'Russian' Mennonites who are of Dutch and Prussian heritage and who settled in Canada, mainly Manitoba and in the US, among other places in McPherson County, Kansas, starting in 1874. In 1878, Holdeman baptized 78 members of the McPherson County group. In 1881, he baptized 118 Kleine Gemeinde Mennonites in Manitoba who had migrated from southern Russia (now Ukraine) to North America some years before. With this group came Peter Toews, who led many Mennonite immigrants from Russia then living in Canada and Kansas into the Holdeman church.

== Theology ==
Holdeman's teachings on salvation and the Bible probably reflect more evangelical Protestant and Pietist influence. The church began during a time of widespread revival and spiritual awakening. They believe that a person can lose his or her salvation if they stop following Jesus, termed the conditional preservation of the saints. Leaving or excommunication from the Holdeman Mennonite church is usually considered as following a loss of salvation. They believe that every person that has repented and turned their life over to Christ and follow Christ (born again as described by Jesus) is a member of the Kingdom of Heaven (Kingdom of God or Kingdom of Christ) and that the Church of God in Christ, Mennonite is a true visible church within the Kingdom of Christ. Baptism, by pouring, is the method by which born-again believers are admitted into this visible church. This physical baptism is the baptism of John and is a picture of the baptism of the Holy Spirit by Christ. Only born again Christians are baptized upon confession of faith and the request to be baptized.

Soteriologically, the new birth is considered the "cornerstone" of the doctrine of salvation. It is described as true repentance from sin and acceptance of the atoning work of Christ by faith, resulting in the redemption from sin and being spiritually born again. Those so affected will find their heart filled by God with peace, have assurance of salvation, and grace. This new birth results in one's conversion from a sinful life unto a life that "brings forth the fruit of the Holy Spirit."

In Christology, the Holdeman Church regarding the virgin birth of Jesus denies that Jesus was made from the flesh or seed of Mary and was a miraculous birth, trying to be closer to the teachings of Menno Simons and Melchior Hoffman than other modern Anabaptists. Eschatologically, they hold to an historic Anabaptist amillennial view of Christ's kingdom and reign, teaching that the present dispensation is the only time in which salvation is offered.

The church and the world are viewed as distinctly separate institutions and thus Christians are not to be conformed to the world (Romans 12:1–2). To maintain nonconformity to the world, Christians must not be "compromised by worldly dress, amusements, or other worldly attractions." Worldly entertainment provided by such things as motion pictures, musical instruments, radio, television, and the improper use of the internet are to be avoided. Modesty in apparel is particularly stressed. Jewelry, "costly or fashionable attire", and bodily ornamentation detract from Christian simplicity. Each person dresses as they are impressed by the reading of the word of God and the leading of the Holy Spirit. Christian attire is most noticeable with the women, who wear dresses and head coverings. A head covering symbolizes the leadership of the husband or the father in the household as mans headship is a picture of Christ being the head of the man and God the Son submits to God the Father

Marriage is seen as divinely instituted between one man and one woman for life, for the propagation, purity, and happiness of the human race. It is only permitted between church members. In marriage, Christians are not to be unequally yoked with unbelievers. Divorce is not the standard solution to a problem in marriage, but scripture allows for divorce when adultery has been committed, and remarriage is sanctioned for those who have divorced for adultery. From the beginning, God instituted marriage between one husband and one wife. It is because of the hardness of man's heart that Moses allowed for a writing of divorce.

== Practice ==
The church holds to a strong Mennonite culture, and obligates its members to lead a life according to Christian principles. The members should pattern their lives after their beliefs in integrity in personal and business dealings, non-involvement in government, loving their neighbors, keeping the avoidance of sin with love, inviting the sinner to repent, and emphasis on voluntary service. Non-resistance is standard practice, whether peacemaking among individuals, regarding lawsuits, or concerning warfare among nations. Holdeman Mennonites do not vote, serve in the military, or in law enforcement professions. They consider themselves to be citizens of a heavenly kingdom, not an earthly one.

=== Courtship ===
The Church of God in Christ Mennonite, via General Conference decision, has forbidden its members from pursuing 'carnal courtship,' a term that encompasses any form of dating or courtship. Instead of allowing young people to choose a partner and engage in dating rituals, every congregation has a formal youth group, which organizes group functions such as bible studies, singing evenings, or volleyball games at which young people get to know each other. If a man wants to get married, he meets with a church minister who "carries the proposal" for him. In this tradition, the minister pays a visit to the young lady to whom the young man wants to propose. She can then accept or reject this proposal. In the event that she says yes, the marriage engagement will usually be announced in church the following Sunday morning after the worship service. Weddings are simple religious services followed by a reception for guests.

=== Membership ===
Membership is through believer’s baptism, by pouring water on the believer's head after requesting to be baptized. Communion is only for members and held with bread and unfermented grape juice rather than wine. Excommunication from the Holdeman Mennonite church is the only accepted way to leave. There are cases of membership annulment, but they are rare. The Holdeman Mennonites practice shunning or avoidance toward former members by not eating at the same table with them, shaking hands with them, or having any business partnerships with them.

=== Worship and service ===
Congregations meet weekly on Sunday mornings for Sunday school and worship. Each congregation has its own schedule for other types of meetings, such as communion, teaching, fellowship, Bible study, and singing. Foot washing is practiced by ministers washing the men's feet, and the wives of ministers and/or deacons washing the women's feet. The kiss of peace is also practiced.

Worship takes place in modest buildings that may contain air condition, carpet, and padded pews, but without any musical instruments. Singing is a cappella and in four-part harmony. Preaching is from the Bible and guided by the Holy Spirit and the gospel doesn't require a seminary degree to comprehend and understand it. Most congregations also hold summer vacation Bible school classes during the summer school holidays. These are open to any children, member or non-member in their communities.

=== Clothing and appearance ===
Simplicity and modesty in clothing, personal possessions, and homes is held as an ideal. Plain dress is mandatory, which for women means a mid-length dress, and a head covering. The headcovering for daily use is black and sits on the back of the head. A second black headscarf is required to be over the head when attending church. Men do not wear a necktie in formal dress and otherwise their appearance resembles the look of a typical American businessman or other conservative Mennonites, in that they are dressed in a modest way that does not reveal much skin.

The men, "by order of creation" wear a beard out of "respect for God’s order". Believing a devotional head covering is Scripturally commanded (1 Corinthians 11:1-16) as "an outward sign of submission to God’s order," the women wear a devotional head covering "for prayer and as a sign of submission." Men do not wear a hat or head covering when praying because Christ is the head of man as God the Father is the head of Christ.

=== Technology ===
Modern technologies like automobiles, telephone, and other modern conveniences are allowed. Television, radio, movies, musical instruments, and "the improper use of the internet" is not allowed. The Church of God in Christ Mennonite encourages members to install special software, purported to be a pornography filter, developed by the technology committee on any internet connected devices. This software blocks access to social media as well as many websites that Christians find objectionable. It can, if wanted, be set up so that if the app is disabled, a notification will be sent to a third party stating that the application is not active.

=== Ministers and church organization ===
Ministers are chosen from within the own ranks and formal training is not required. There are only two positions of office in the church and only men are eligible. Ministers and deacons from each congregation are chosen by the local membership by first asking a series of questions regarding a need for more staff, whether there is a gift for the position, and whether the members feel that it is the right time to elect a staff member. These questions are by show of hands and only if they all pass with a significant majority does a secret ballot vote take place. The vote is one ballot per member and there is no nomination process. The ballots are counted by the ministers already in office and, if a high enough percentage of the congregation votes for the same individual, he is elected. The percentages needed for a successful election or total number of votes cast for each candidate are not public knowledge. There are no salaried ministers and they seldom use prepared notes, but rather preach extemporaneously.

A General Conference made up of ministers, deacons, delegates and members meets every seven years (more often if necessary) for decision-making. An annual meeting is held yearly to provide a formal meeting for all business and corporate activities. The General Conference and Annual meeting is open to any members to attend. Matters at the General Conference are voted on by all members present. At each annual meeting a minister's and deacon's meeting is also held to discuss matters pertaining to spiritual life and practical issues and is sometimes, but not always a closed meeting to lay members.

=== Education ===
Formal education beyond eighth or ninth grade is rare outside of California and Quebec (to the tenth grade to comply with compulsory school attendance laws in these cases where religious exemption has not been made) and in the case of job training such as carpentry, nursing, etc. Congregations in Canada teach grades K-9. One thing that causes the Quebec government to give problems to these schools is that they teach Young Earth creationism in their science curriculum, and they use curriculum viewed as Bible-based.

Nearly all congregations have their own private schools. Those that cannot do this because of legal issues, run under a similar system: group homeschooling. 50-70% of their teachers are unmarried women aged eighteen and up. These teachers have some basic formal training in education, and their secondary education varies from completion of a high school curriculum through correspondence to no further education than what they received within their private schools. The main requirement to teach is a solid standing as a member in the Church and a reasonable skill set to be able to handle the grade that they will be teaching. This is determined in consultation with the applicant's minister and local elected school board.

== Adherents and congregations ==
From a small beginning, membership grew to around 750 at the time of Holdeman's death in the year 1900. In 1953 the baptized membership was 5,308, in 41 congregations in Canada and the US. There were missions in Mexico and New Mexico with three ordained ministers of Spanish language, and also a mission station in Canada among indigenous peoples. The church experienced slow but steady growth until the mid-1970s. During the later 1970s the growth slowed, then continued. Numerous new churches have been started because of the growth as members have sought opportunity in new locations, and churches have been planted in new states and provinces.

In 2009, there were 14,672 members and 138 congregations in the US. According to the 2010 US census, there were 153 congregations in the US. In 2021, the church had 27,118 members, of whom 16,132 lived in the US and 5,396 in Canada.

Membership of the Church of God in Christ, Mennonite
Year	United States	Canada	Other Countries	Total
1900	-	-	-	~750
1950	-	-	-	~5,000
1960	4,633	1,555	203	6,391
1970	-	-	-	~8,500
1980	7,478	2,420	875	10,773
1990	9,684	-	-	-
2000	12,144	4,132	2,061	18,337
2010	14,804	5,081	2,894	22,779
2021	16,132	5,396	5,590	27,118

Kansas continues to contain the largest population of the denomination, with over 4,000 members. Current membership still greatly reflects the growth of the church through the Swiss-German ancestry of those such as Holdeman, the Kansas-"Russian Mennonite" ancestry, and the Manitoba-"Russian Mennonite" ancestry. Yet, in some regions, like Quebec, New Brunswick, Nova Scotia and Eastern Ontario, there is a high percentage of believers who have recently joined the Church and do not have the same roots as the majority of the Holdemans in North America, who are still ethnic Mennonites.

In addition to the US and Canada, the Church of God has established congregations and mission work in various countries in Africa, Asia, Central and South America, the Caribbean, and Europe.

== Controversies ==
=== 2016 lawsuit and allegations ===
In February 2016, a lawsuit was filed against the Mennonite church with the plaintiff alleging that he was sexually assaulted by his father from age 11. The lawsuit alleged that clergy failed to contact authorities as required by mandatory reporter statutes. His lawsuit pointed allegations of sexual abuse by people who attended congregations affiliated with the Church of God In Christ Mennonite, some resulting arrests and convictions. The case was settled out of court, and the terms of the settlement were not published by the parties.

=== 2022 allegations by Mennonite Abuse Prevention List ===
On August 2, 2022, a nonprofit called Mennonite Abuse Prevention published a report alleging how sexual abuse allegations are handled in the church. This report alleges, in a series of cases, that there was clergy misconduct including failures to report abuse and cases where victims were discouraged from reporting abuse to police. The allegations claim that, as part of the settlement of the 2016 lawsuit, every congregation explored local mandatory reporting laws and declared that their congregations would now comply. The allegations further claim that, that same year, court records show that ministers at the Gospel Mennonite Church congregation in Almena, Wisconsin were notified that Leslie Toews, a member at the congregation, had sexually abused a 13-year-old girl for about a year, and claim that this abuse was not reported. The allegations claim that the alleged perpetrator arranged to speak with detectives four years later, in 2021. MAP claims that church policy documents shared with them show that church members, including school teachers, are required by law to report directly to authorities, are required to report abuse to clergy, who then investigate and make a judgement call with regard to whether the abuse should be reported to authorities.

=== The purge of the 1970s (The New Way) ===
Economic trends in the 1970s led to an increasing rate of non compliant members, in addition to some members who began to question the doctrine of the "one true church." Church discipline concerns led to a "new way" of dealing with non-conforming members. Church leadership began the process of interviewing every member of every congregation around the conference. This new method was referred to as "paneling", which led to number of members who were disciplined and excommunicated. The practice of excommunicating former members, known as The Avoidance, is still practiced and is an official Conference Decision (policy).

== Publications ==
The Messenger of Truth, which was begun in the early 20th century, is issued bi-weekly from the church headquarters in Moundridge, Kansas, US. Canadian offices are located in Greenland, Manitoba. The church's publishing arm is Gospel Publishers.

== See also ==
- Schowalter Foundation

== Literature ==
- John M. Penner: A Concise History of the Church of God, 1967.
- Cornelius J. Dyck, Dennis D. Martin, et al. (editors): Mennonite Encyclopedia, 1990.
- P. G. Hiebert: Principles of Faith, 3rd edition 1967.
