= Holy kiss =

Traditional Christian greeting

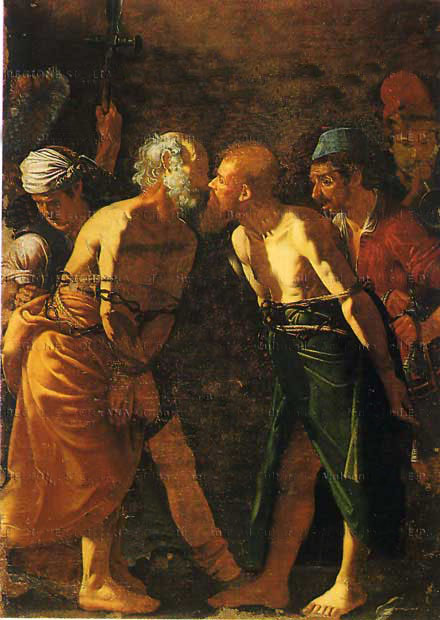
Farewell of Saints Peter and Paul, showing the Apostles giving each other the holy kiss before their martyrdom. (Alonzo Rodriguez, 16th century, Museo Regionale di Messina).

The holy kiss is an ancient traditional Christian greeting, also called the kiss of peace or kiss of charity, and sometimes the "brother kiss" (among men), or the "sister kiss" (among women). Such greetings signify a wish and blessing that peace be with the recipient, and besides their spontaneous uses they have certain ritualized or formalized uses long established in Christian liturgy.

In the New Testament of the Christian Bible, the injunction for believers to greet one another with a holy kiss is given in five places in the New Testament. The early Christian apologist Tertullian wrote that before leaving a house, Christians are to give the holy kiss and say "peace to this house". Apostolic Constitutions likewise declared "Then let the men apart, and the women apart, salute each other with a kiss in the Lord."

Among Conservative Anabaptists, such as the Conservative Mennonite churches and the Dunkard Brethren Church, the holy kiss is counted as an ordinance of the Church. As such, denominations of Conservative Anabaptism observe the practice of the holy kiss. Other denominations (such as the Catholic Church and Lutheran Churches) use various forms of greeting to serve equivalent purposes; these include kisses, handshakes, gestures or hugs, any of which may be called a sign of peace.

== History ==
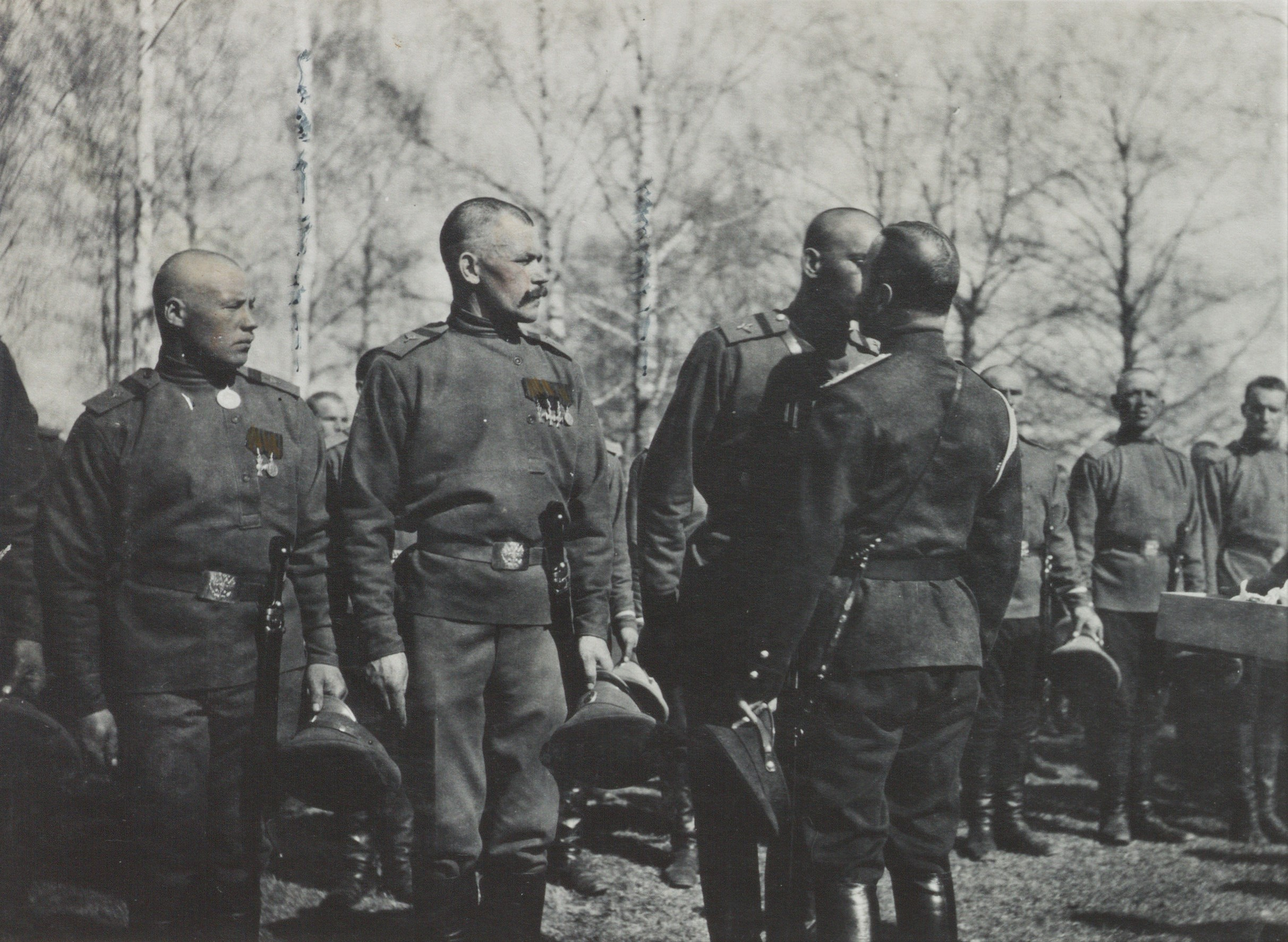
Tsar of Russia Nicholas II gives a "brother kiss" to a soldier, 1916.

It was the widespread custom in the ancient eastern Mediterranean for men to greet each other with a kiss. It was also the custom in ancient Judea and practiced also by Christians. However, the New Testament's references to a holy kiss (Ancient Greek: ἐν ἁγίω φιλήματι, en hagio philemati) and kiss of love (ἐν φιλήματι ἀγάπης) transformed the character of the act beyond a greeting; furthermore, in the early Church, "the verbal exchange of 'peace' with a kiss appears to be a Christian innovation, there being no clear example in pre-Christian literature." The holy kiss was thus followed as a biblical teaching, rather than a cultural tradition. Such a kiss is mentioned five times in the concluding section of letters in the New Testament:

- Romans 16:16—"Greet one another with a holy kiss" (Greek: ἀσπάσασθε ἀλλήλους ἐν φιλήματι ἁγίῳ).
- 1 Corinthians 16:20—"Greet one another with a holy kiss" (Greek: ἀσπάσασθε ἀλλήλους ἐν φιλήματι ἁγίῳ).
- 2 Corinthians 13:12—"Greet one another with a holy kiss" (Greek: ἀσπάσασθε ἀλλήλους ἐν ἁγίῳ φιλήματι).
- 1 Thessalonians 5:26—"Greet all the brothers with a holy kiss" (Greek: ἀσπάσασθε τοὺς ἀδελφοὺς πάντας ἐν φιλήματι ἁγίῳ).
- 1 Peter 5:14—"Greet one another with a kiss of love" (Greek: ἀσπάσασθε ἀλλήλους ἐν φιλήματι ἀγάπης).

The early Christian apologist Tertullian wrote that before leaving a house, Christians are to give the holy kiss and say "peace to this house". Justin Martyr, Origen, and Cyprian attested to the practice of the holy kiss among Christians as well.

Though also practiced outside of church, since the aforementioned epistles were addressed to Christian communities, the practice of the holy kiss was especially relevant in communal worship. It has been noted that these mentions of the holy kiss come at the end of these epistles, indicating "that the kiss was shared in conjunction with the benedictions at the conclusion of worship services" though it soon "became associated with the Eucharist" and thus "its location during the worship service moved forward in time to the celebration of Communion". The holy kiss was seen as an essential part of preparing to partake in the Eucharist:

Peace, reconciliation, and unity were the very essence of the church's life; without them communion would have been a sham. Bestowed by the Spirit and experienced in prayer, their liturgical expression—which pointed forward to the eucharist—was the holy kiss.

For the early Christians, the holy kiss "was associated with the peace and unity given by the Holy Spirit to the congregation".

The writings of the early church fathers speak of the holy kiss, which they call "a sign of peace", which was already part of the Eucharistic liturgy, occurring after the Lord's Prayer in the Roman Rite and the rites directly derived from it. St. Augustine, for example, speaks of it in one of his Easter Sermons:

Then, after the consecration of the Holy Sacrifice of God, because He wished us also to be His sacrifice, a fact which was made clear when the Holy Sacrifice was first instituted, and because that Sacrifice is a sign of what we are, behold, when the Sacrifice is finished, we say the Lord's Prayer which you have received and recited. After this, the 'Peace be with you' is said, and the Christians embrace one another with the holy kiss. This is a sign of peace; as the lips indicate, let peace be made in your conscience, that is, when your lips draw near to those of your brother, do not let your heart withdraw from his. Hence, these are great and powerful sacraments.

Augustine's Sermon 227 is just one of several early Christian primary sources, both textual and iconographic (i.e., in works of art) providing clear evidence that the "kiss of peace" as practiced in the Christian liturgy was customarily exchanged for the first several centuries, not mouth to cheek, but mouth to mouth (note that men were separated from women during the liturgy) for, as the primary sources also show, this is how early Christians believed Christ and his followers exchanged their own kiss. For example, in his Paschale carmen (c. 425–50), Latin priest-poet Sedulius condemns Judas and his betrayal of Christ with a kiss thus, "And leading that sacrilegious mob with its menacing swords and spikes, you press your mouth against his, and infuse your poison into his honey?"

The kiss of peace was known in Greek from an early date as eirḗnē (εἰρήνη, 'peace', which became pax in Latin and peace in English). The source of the peace greeting is probably from the common Hebrew greeting shalom; and the greeting "Peace be with you" is similarly a translation of the Hebrew shalom aleichem. In the Gospels, both greetings were used by Jesus – e.g. Luke 24:36; John 20:21, John 20:26. The Latin term translated as 'sign of peace' is simply pax ('peace'), not signum pacis ('sign of peace') nor osculum pacis ('kiss of peace'). So the invitation by the deacon, or in his absence by the priest, "Let us offer each other the sign of peace", is in Latin: Offerte vobis pacem ("Offer each other peace" or "Offer each other the peace").

From an early date, to guard against any abuse of this form of salutation, women and men were required to sit separately, and the kiss of peace was given only by women to women and by men to men, with closed mouths.

The holy kiss was distinguished as a ritual only to be partaken of by baptized Christians, with catechumens and non-Christians not being greeted this way. Apostolic Tradition specified with regard to catechumens: "When they have prayed they shall not give the kiss of peace for their kiss is not yet holy".

== Liturgical practices ==
Among Conservative Anabaptists, such as the Conservative Mennonite churches and the Dunkard Brethren Church, the holy kiss is counted as an ordinance of the Church. As such, denominations of Conservative Anabaptism observe the practice of the holy kiss.

The practice of a sign of peace remains a part of the worship in traditional churches, including the Catholic Church, Eastern Catholic Churches, Eastern Orthodox churches, Oriental Orthodox churches, the Church of the East; the Lutheran Church, the Anglican Church, and among Spiritual Christians, where it is often called the 'kiss of peace', 'sign of peace', 'holy kiss' or simply 'peace' or 'pax'.

=== Anabaptism ===
The holy kiss is particularly important among many Anabaptist denominations, being counted as an ordinance of the Church. Anabaptist groups observing the holy kiss include the Apostolic Christian Church, the Amish, the Schwarzenau Brethren, and many Conservative Mennonite Churches including the Church of God in Christ, Mennonite.

=== Eastern Orthodoxy ===
In the Eastern Orthodox Church's Divine Liturgy of St. John Chrysostom, the exchange of the peace occurs at the midpoint of the service, when the scripture readings have been completed and the Eucharistic prayers are yet to come. The priest announces, "Let us love one another that with one accord we may confess—" and the people conclude the sentence, "Father, Son, and Holy Spirit, the Trinity, one in essence and undivided." At that point the kiss of peace is exchanged by clergy at the altar, and in some churches among the laity as well (the custom is being reintroduced, but is not universal). Immediately after the peace, the deacon cries "The doors! The doors!"; in ancient times, the catechumens and other non-members of the church would depart at this point, and the doors would be shut behind them. At that, worshippers then recite the Nicene Creed.

In the Eastern Orthodox Liturgy, the kiss of peace acts as a preparation for the Creed: "Let us love one another that we may confess [...] the Trinity."

In the early centuries the kiss of peace was exchanged between the clergy: clergy kissing the bishop, laymen kissing laymen, and women kissing the women, according to the Apostolic Constitutions. Today the kiss of love is exchanged between concelebrating priests. Such has been the case for centuries. In a few Orthodox dioceses in the world in the last few decades, the kiss of peace between laymen has attempted to be reinstituted, usually as a handshake, hugging or cheek kissing.

Another example of an exchange of the peace is when, during the Divine Liturgy, the Priest declares to the people "Peace be with all", and their reply: "And with your Spirit". More examples of this practice may be found within Eastern Orthodoxy, but these are the most prominent examples.

=== Catholicism ===
In the Catholic Church, the term now used is not "the kiss of peace", but "the sign of peace" or "the rite of peace". The General Instruction of the Roman Missal states: "There follows the Rite of Peace, by which the Church entreats peace and unity for herself and for the whole human family, and the faithful express to each other their ecclesial communion and mutual charity before communicating in the Sacrament." The priest says or sings: "The peace of the Lord be with you always", to which the people respond: "And with your spirit." Then, as stated in the Roman Missal, "if appropriate, the Deacon, or the Priest, adds: 'Let us offer each other the sign of peace.'"

In the Roman Rite, it is placed after the Pater Noster and before the Fractio Panis. Even within the Catholic Church, there are liturgical rites (the Ambrosian Rite and the Mozarabic Rite) in which it is placed after the Liturgy of the Word, before the gifts for consecration are put on the altar. The latter placing is influenced by the recommendation in Matthew 5:23–24 about seeking reconciliation with another before completing an offering at the altar. It was a practice in Rome itself at the time of Justin Martyr in the middle of the 2nd century. In the 3rd century the present placing was chosen not only in Rome but also in other parts of the West such as Roman Africa, where Saint Augustine understood it as related to the petition, "Forgive us our trespasses as we forgive those who trespass against us", in the Lord's Prayer and to the link between being in communion with the body of Christ understood as the Church and receiving communion with the body of Christ in the Eucharist.

Within the Roman Rite, instructions for the sign of peace differ depending on the liturgy being performed. In the Tridentine Mass, the sign of peace is given at Solemn Masses alone and is exchanged only among the clergy (unless emperors, kings or princes were present, in which case they, too, received the greeting by means of a pax). It is given by extending both arms in a slight embrace with the words Pax tecum ("Peace be with you"), first by the priest celebrant to the deacon, who in turn gives it to the subdeacon, who gives the sign to any other clergy present in choir dress. There also existed a custom in some places of the groom giving the Peace to the bride at the Nuptial Mass. However, unlike the present form of the Roman Rite, neither the bride nor the groom would pass the peace to anyone else.

In the Mass of Paul VI, the sign of peace is used at most Masses but is not obligatory. It is exchanged between all present in no prescribed order, except that "the Priest gives the sign of peace to a Deacon or minister." The manner prescribed is as follows: "It is appropriate that each one give the sign of peace only to those who are nearest and in a sober manner. The Priest may give the sign of peace to the ministers but always remains within the sanctuary, so as not to disturb the celebration. He does likewise if for a just reason he wishes to extend the sign of peace to some few of the faithful."

The following are considered abuses by the Congregation for Divine Worship and the Discipline of the Sacraments:

- introducing a "song of peace" to accompany the rite;
- the faithful moving from their places to exchange the sign of peace;
- the priest leaving the altar to give the sign of peace to some of the faithful;
- expressing other sentiments, e.g. expressing congratulations, best wishes or condolences among those present at a wedding, funeral or other ceremony.

The gesture by which the sign of peace is exchanged is to be determined by the local episcopal conference. In some countries, such as the United States, the conference has laid down no rules, and the everyday handshake is generally used, while in other countries, such as India and Thailand, a bow is prescribed. A 2014 letter of the Congregation for Divine Worship and the Discipline of the Sacraments recommended that conferences choose gestures more appropriate than "familiar and profane gestures of greeting".

=== Evangelical-Lutheranism ===
The sign of peace during the offering of the Mass at Hedvig Eleonora Church (Evangelical-Lutheran) in Stockholm, Sweden

The Evangelical Lutheran Church in America teaches:

The exchange of peace is a ministry, an announcement of grace we make to each other, a summary of the gift given to us in the liturgy of the Word. This ministry we do to each other is far greater than a sociable handshake or a ritual of friendship or a moment of informality. Because of the presence of Jesus Christ, we give to each other what we are saying: Christ's own peace. Then, having been gathered by the Spirit around the Risen One present in the word, we turn to celebrate his meal (p. 173).

Within the celebration of the Holy Communion, the sign of peace takes the form of a kiss or handshake.

=== Anglicanism and Methodism ===
In the Anglican Church it is common practice at more formal services for the congregation to be invited to "offer one another a sign of peace". However, this is usually a handshake although married couples may kiss one another instead. Methodists likewise exchange "signs and words of God's peace".

=== Reformed ===
The Reformed tradition (inclusive of the Continental Reformed, Presbyterian, Evangelical Anglican and Congregationalist Churches) has adopted the holy kiss either metaphorically (in that members extend a pure, warm welcome that is referred to as a 'holy kiss') or literally (in that members kiss one another).

Other Prodestant Denominations

Many Prodestant Denominations do hold to this tradition as a mid-point greeting among the laity. After worship, announcements the pastor would introduce the laymen to greet each other, at this point many will stand up; wave, shake hands, hug and some may give a kiss on the cheek. This is the modern form of this tradition to this day in various traditions.

== See also ==
- Right Hand of Fellowship
- Kiss of Judas
- Pax (liturgy)
- Pax (liturgical object), an object formerly kissed as a substitute during Catholic masses
- Socialist fraternal kiss
