= Transcona Railer Express =

- City: Winnipeg, Manitoba (Canada)
- League: Manitoba Major Junior Hockey League
- Founded: 2012
- Home arena: Ed Golding Memorial Arena (capacity: 500)
- Colours: Blue, Red
- President: Don Gale
- General manager: Derek Gagnon
- Head coach: Derek Gagnon

Championships
- Jack McKenzie Trophy: 1 (2025–26)
- Art Moug Trophy: 1 (2025–26)

The Transcona Railer Express are a Canadian junior ice hockey team based in Winnipeg, Manitoba, Canada. They are part of the Manitoba Major Junior Hockey League (MMJHL).

== History ==
Formed in the fall of 2012 after the demise of the Transcona Railers (1977–2011), a group of alumni applied for membership into the MMJHL. On January 7, 2012 the league board accepted the new Transcona franchise for the 2012–13 season.

== Season-by-season record ==
Note: GP = Games Played, W = Wins, L = Losses, T = Ties, OTL = Overtime Losses, GF = Goals for, GA = Goals against

Season	GP	W	L	T	OTL	Points	GF	GA	Finish	Playoffs
2012-13	45	1	42	0	2	4	74	308	10th, MMJHL	Did not qualify for playoffs
2013-14	45	10	29	0	6	26	141	223	10th, MMJHL	Did not qualify for playoffs
2014-15	45	22	20	0	3	47	150	140	7th of 10	Lost quarter-finals, 0-4 (Riels)
2015-16	45	19	23	0	3	41	159	191	8th of 10	Lost quarter-finals, 0-4 (Raiders)
2016-17	45	17	27	0	1	35	146	191	9th of 10	Did not qualify for playoffs
2017-18	45	29	11	0	5	63	175	126	3rd of 10	Won quarter-finals, 4-1 (Victorias); Won semifinals, 4-2 (Hawks); Lost League Finals 1-4 (Raiders)
2018-19	45	24	16	0	5	53	164	149	5th of 10	Won quarter-finals, 4-3 (Victorias); Lost semifinals, 3-4 (Canucks)
2019-20	45	29	15	0	1	59	160	134	3rd of 10	Playoffs Cancelled (COVID-19)
2020-21	Season lost due to COVID-19 pandemic									
2021-22	45	33	11	0	1	67	188	95	2nd of 10	Won quarter-finals, 4-1(Knights); Lost semi-finals, 2-4 (Twisters)
2022-23	45	19	23	3	1	42	167	157	7th of 10	Won quarter-finals, 4-1(Knights); Lost semi-finals, 1-4 (Canucks)
2023-24	45	20	20	2	3	45	153	169	8th of 10	Lost quarter-finals, 0-4(Canucks)
2024-25	45	30	9	6	0	66	208	115	3rd of 10	Won quarter-finals, 4-2(Canucks); Won Semifinals 4-1 (Hawks); Lost Finals 1-4 (Riels)
2025-26	44	36	7	1	0	73	215	104	1st of 10	Won quarter-finals, 4-0 (Raiders); Won Semifinals 4-0 (Royal Knights); WON Finals 4-3 (Riels)

== See also ==
- List of ice hockey teams in Manitoba
