= St. Boniface Riels =

Canadian junior ice hockey team

St Boniface Riels
- City: Winnipeg, Manitoba, Canada
- League: Manitoba Major Junior Hockey League
- Founded: 1971
- Home arena: Southdale Community Centre
- Colours: Gold, Black, White
- General manager: Jason Frykas
- Head coach: Ryan Frykas

Championships
- Jack McKenzie Trophy: 6 (1971-72, 1972–73, 1984–85, 1985–86, 2014–15, 2024–25)
- Art Moug Trophy: 7 (1971-72, 1972–73, 1975–76, 1981–82, 1984–85, 1985–86, 2013–14)

The St Boniface Riels are a junior ice hockey team based in Winnipeg, Manitoba, Canada. Founded in 1971, they are part of the Manitoba Major Junior Hockey League (MMJHL).

The Riels have won the Art Moug Trophy (regular season winner) 7 times and the Jack McKenzie Trophy (playoff champion) 6 times.

== Season-by-season record ==
Note: W = Wins, L = Losses, T = Ties, OTL = Overtime Losses, GF = Goals for, GA = Goals against

Season	GP	W	L	T	OTL	GF	GA	Points	Finish	Playoffs
1971-72	30	22	6	2	-	208	123	46	1st MMJHL	League champion
1972-73	35	24	7	4	-	234	157	52	1st MMJHL	League champion
1973-74	35	16	16	3	-	168	162	35	4th MMJHL	
1974-75	37	18	12	7	-	228	180	43	3rd MMJHL	
1975-76	36	22	7	7	-	214	154	51	1st MMJHL	
1976-77	42	12	22	8	-	201	275	32	5th MMJHL	
1977-78	42	14	22	6	-	211	252	34	5th MMJHL	
1978-79	42	23	13	6	-	239	162	52	4th MMJHL	
1979-80	41	12	28	1	-	174	257	25	7th MMJHL	
1980-81	42	21	21	0	-	227	235	42	4th MMJHL	
1981-82	41	28	13	0	-	228	164	56	1st MMJHL	
1982-83	42	19	22	1	-	225	212	39	7th MMJHL	
1983-84	40	21	16	3	-	224	210	45	3rd MMJHL	
1984-85	40	32	7	1	-	277	160	65	1st MMJHL	League champion
1985-86	42	29	10	3	-	270	204	61	1st MMJHL	League champion
1986-87	42	19	22	1	-	264	257	39	6th MMJHL	
1987-88	42	17	22	3	-	237	280	37	4th MMJHL	
1988-89	42	6	35	1	-	163	300	13	8th MMJHL	
1989-90	42	12	38	2	-	207	330	26	7th MMJHL	
1990-91	42	5	36	1	-	192	404	11	8th MMJHL	
1991-92	42	6	36	0	-	178	319	12	7th MMJHL	
1992-93	42	10	32	0	-	188	343	20	7th MMJHL	
1993-94	42	20	22	0	-	211	274	40	5th MMJHL	
1994-95	42	7	34	1	-	140	257	15	8th MMJHL	
1995-96	42	10	31	1	-	178	253	21	8th MMJHL	
1996-97	42	15	27	0	-	176	252	30	6th MMJHL	
1997-98	42	18	20	4	-	186	192	40	4th MMJHL	
1998-99	42	21	20	1	0	197	201	43	5th MMJHL	
1999-00	42	5	37	0	0	116	257	10	8th MMJHL	
2000-01	42	20	19	3	0	169	169	43	4th MMJHL	
2001-02	45	20	22	1	2	191	211	43	7th MMJHL	
2002-03	45	19	22	0	4	189	217	42	6th MMJHL	
2003-04	45	17	23	2	3	162	231	39	7th MMJHL	
2004-05	45	9	32	0	4	176	304	22	9th MMJHL	DNQ
2005-06	45	5	39	0	1	132	345	11	10th MMJHL	DNQ
2006-07	45	6	36	2	1	147	305	15	10th MMJHL	DNQ
2007-08	45	20	22	1	2	191	207	43	7th MMJHL	Lost quarterfinal
2008-09	45	25	18	-	2	195	159	52	5th MMJHL	Lost semifinal
2009-10	45	22	21	-	2	160	162	46	5th MMJHL	Lost quarterfinal
2010-11	45	16	26	-	3	140	184	35	8th MMJHL	Lost quarterfinal
2011-12	40	10	26	-	4	118	182	24	8th MMJHL	Lost quarterfinal
2012-13	45	23	21	-	1	154	144	47	7th MMJHL	Lost quarterfinal
2013-14	45	37	6	-	2	239	144	76	1st MMJHL	Lost final (Raiders)
2014-15	45	29	11	-	5	203	143	63	2nd MMJHL	Won quarterfinals, 4-0 (Railer Express); Won semifinals, 4-2 (Hawks); Won final, 4-0 (Raiders)
2015-16	45	20	20	-	5	152	170	45	7th MMJHL	Lost quarterfinals, 2-4 (Hawks)
2016-17	45	21	18	-	5	168	177	47	8th MMJHL	Lost quarterfinals, 0-4 (Hawks)
2017-18	45	19	22	-	4	146	163	42	8th MMJHL	Lost quarterfinals, 0-4 (Raiders)
2018-19	45	11	30	-	4	125	203	26	9th MMJHL	DNQ
2019-20	45	13	27	-	5	147	207	31	9th MMJHL	DNQ
2021-22	45	6	36	-	3	124	223	15	10th of 10 MMJHL	DNQ
2022-23	45	15	27	2	1	146	201	33	8th of 10 MMJHL	Lost quarterfinals, 1-4 (Canucks)
2023-24	45	24	17	2	2	148	149	52	3rd of 10 MMJHL	Won quarterfinals, 1-0 (Twins); Lost semifinals, 0-4 (Twisters)
2024-25	45	31	11	1	2	200	104	65	4th of 10 MMJHL	Won quarterfinals, 4-0 (Victorias); Won semifinals, 4-0 (Twins); Won League Finals 4-1(Railer Express); MMJHL - Jack MacKenzie Champions
2025-26	45	35	10	1	3	168	118	66	2nd of 10 MMJHL	Won quarterfinals, 4-1 (Twins); Won semifinals, 4-1 (Canucks); Lost League Finals 3-4(Railer Express)

== League championships ==
=== Jack Mackenzie Trophy (playoffs) ===
- 1971-72, 1972–73, 1984–85, 1985–86, 2014–15, 2024–25

=== Art Moug Trophy (regular season) ===
- 1971-72, 1972–73, 1975–76, 1981–82, 1984–85, 1985–86, 2013–14
