= Stonewall Jets =

- City: Winnipeg, Manitoba
- League: Manitoba Major Junior Hockey League
- Founded: 1964
- Home arena: Veterans Memorial Sports Complex
- Colours: blue and yellow
- President: Dale McClintock
- General manager: Dale McClintock
- Head coach: Brock Couch

The Stonewall Jets are a junior hockey team that plays in Stonewall, Manitoba, Canada. The Jets home arena is Veterans Memorial Sports Complex which is also home to the Stonewall Collegiate Institute Rams, Stonewall Blues Minor Hockey Association and Stonewall Flyers Senior hockey club. The Jets previously played in the Ice Palace (Stonewall Arena).

== History ==
Previously the Jets played in the MJBHL (1964-2001). Stonewall joined the Manitoba Major Junior Hockey League in 2001. Their first head coach in the MMJHL was Ed Harvie. Their first general manager was Bill Smith. Their biggest rival is the Charleswood Hawks.

The Jets won their first championship in 2016 with a dramatic finish to the season. Facing elimination in the first round, Stonewall rallied to win three-straight games and advance. Stonewall then swept the regular season winner Raiders Junior Hockey Club before sweeping Pembina Valley Twisters in the finals.

Stonewall returned to the MMJHL Finals in 2017, but came up short in their bid for back-to-back championships falling in six games to the Raiders Junior Hockey Club.

== Season-by-season ==
Season	W	L	T	OTL	Pts	Finish	Playoffs
2001-02	11	33	0	1	23	9th of 10	DNQ
2002-03	12	29	0	4	28	9th of 10	DNQ
2003-04	11	31	1	2	25	10th of 10	DNQ
2004-05	22	22	0	1	45	5th of 10	
2005-06	26	17	1	1	54	5th of 10	
2006-07	25	18	1	1	52	4th of 10	
2007-08	16	24	1	4	37	8th of 10	
2008-09	22	19	--	4	48	8th of 10	
2009-10	18	21	--	6	42	7th of 10	
2010-11	17	25	--	3	37	7th of 10	
2011-12	21	13	--	6	48	4th of 9	
2012-13	6	37	--	2	14	9th of 10	DNQ
2013-14	18	23	--	4	42	7th of 10	
2014-15	19	24	--	1	39	8th of 10	
2015-16	26	17	--	2	54	4th of 10	Won Quarterfinals 4-3 (St. Vital Victorias); Won Semifinals 4-0 (Raiders Junior Hockey Club); Won Finals 4-0 (Pembina Valley Twisters); MMJHL Champions
2016-17	31	13	--	1	54	2nd of 10	Won Quarterfinals 4-2 (St. Vital Victorias); Won Semifinals 4-2 (Pembina Valley Twisters); Lost Finals 2-4 (Raiders Junior Hockey Club)
2017-18	24	17	--	4	52	5th of 10	Won Quarterfinals 4-2 (Canucks); Lost Semifinals 1-4 (Raiders Junior Hockey Club)
2018 to 2022 records not entered
2022-23	12	30	--	2	26	10th of 10	did not qualify for post season play
2023-24	12	19	20	6	44	9th of 10	did not qualify for post season play
2024-25	18	21	4	2	42	7th of 10	lost Quarterfinals 0-4 (Charleswood Hawks)
2025-26	27	16	0	2	56	3rd of 10	lost Quarterfinals 3-4 (River East Royal Knights)

== League championships ==
=== Jack Mackenzie Trophy (playoffs) ===
- 2016

=== Art Moug Trophy (regular season) ===
- none
