= Providence Pilots =

College sports teams

The Providence Pilots are the varsity college sports teams from Providence University College and Theological Seminary located in Otterburne, Manitoba. For over twenty years, the teams competed as the Freemen before changing the name in 2013 to the more gender-neutral and institutionally relevant nickname, Pilots. The Pilots play Men's and Women's soccer, volleyball, basketball, and hockey. The Pilots compete in the NCCAA (soccer, basketball), NIAC (basketball, volleyball), ACCA (basketball), NIRSA (volleyball), NIVC (volleyball), and MCAC (hockey, soccer, basketball). The school won NIAC and NIVC Championships in Women's basketball and volleyball in the 2006-07 season.

== 2006-2007 Pilots Athletics ==
The 2006-2007 season was another successful season for Freemen athletics. The Men's soccer team had a very strong season with a Varsity and Junior Varsity teams competing in CPAC with the Varsity team competing in NCCAA. The Varsity Men's Soccer team won the CPAC championship soundly over the CMU Blazers 6-1. They carried that momentum into NCCAA Regionals and captured a Regional Championship with a 2-0 win over Faith Baptist in the Finals. Coming into Nationals in Kissimmee, Florida as the #7 seeded team, the Freemen were outshot, yet only lost each game by 2 goals. The Women's Soccer team had a strong year as well, capturing their second straight CPAC Championship defeating Steinbach 6-0. They carried that momentum into NCCAA Regionals where they defeated NCU 3-1 for their first ever Regional Finals berth, only to be defeated by Crown.

The Women's basketball team captured the NIAC championship as the host team. The Freemen came into the tournament as the #1 seed and defeated Trinity Bible College for the title. The Men's Basketball team had another tough season, yet had a bright spot during the NIAC Tournament as well. With the BLUE MAN CREW making more noise than ever had been heard in recent Providence athletics history, the #7 seeded Freemen played hard against Oak Hills and defeated them 74-66 for their first win of the tournament. Even though the Freemen fell to Alex Tech by only 2 points in the Consolation Finals, the Freemen finished the tournament in 6th place, bettering their #7 seed entrance.

The Men's Volleyball team has also been very successful capturing the NIVC Championship in Michigan as well as coming in second place at the NIRSA National Championships in Kentucky. Women's Volleyball also had success capturing a NIAC championship in Owatonna, Minnesota. The Men's hockey team finished the season 2-6 and finished third in CPAC while the Women's Hockey Team finished 4th in the annual CPAC Tournament in St Pierre.

== 2007–2008 Providence Freemen athletics wrap-up ==
While the Providence varsity teams are not as strong as they used to be they still managed to capture some strong moments this year. The men's soccer team had a very strong season competing in CPAC and the NCCAA. The Varsity Men's soccer team won the CPAC championship once again over the CMU Blazers 2-0. They carried that momentum into NCCAA Regionals and captured a Regional Championship with a 1-0 win over archrivals Crown College in the Finals. Coming into Nationals in Kissimmee, Florida as the #7-seeded team, the Freemen were outshot, yet only lost their first contest in overtime and then won their second contest in penalty kicks. They ended up finishing 6th in the nation. The women's soccer team had their best year yet, capturing their second straight CPAC Championship defeating archrivals CMU 2-1 in overtime in the Finals. They carried that momentum into NCCAA Regionals where they were defeated by Crown College 1-0, yet were able to grab the wildcard seed into Nationals. At Nationals, the women's soccer team was able to pull off a win in their first contest in penalty kicks. After a loss to Philadelphia in their second contest, the Freelady's won the '3rd-place game' in dramatic fashion, winning 1-0 in overtime against Manhattan.

The men's hockey team returned to its former glory as they finished the season with a mediocre 2-4-2 record, finishing in the basement of the three-team CPAC men's hockey league. However, coming into the CPAC Final Four tournament in Landmark, the Freemen were able to upset the defending CPAC champion ACC Cougars in the semi-finals by a score of 2-1. Providence played their archrivals from CMU in the finals only to be defeated by a score of 4-3.

== Men's Soccer ==
2007 NCCAA North-Central Regional Champions
2007 CPAC Champions

=== 2006 Regular Season (NCCAA/CPAC) ===
Conference	Date	Opponent	Result
NCCAA	Sept. 8	Crown College	Loss: 1-4
NCCAA	Sept. 9	Crown College	Loss: 2-3 (OT)
NAIA II	Sept. 14	Jamestown College	Win: 1-0
CPAC/ACCA	Sept. 19	Canadian Mennonite University	Loss: 0-2
NCCAA	Sept. 21	Faith Baptist	Win: 1-0
NCCAA	Sept. 22	Pillsbury Baptist	Win: 2-1
CPAC	Sept. 27	Steinbach Bible College	Win: 6-0
Exhibition	Sept. 30	Alumni	Draw: 3-3
CPAC	Oct. 1	College U. de St. Boniface	Win: 4-2
NCAA III	Oct. 4	University of Wisconsin Superior	Loss: 0-2
NCCAA	Oct. 5	North Central University	Loss: 1-2
CPAC	Oct. 9	Steinbach Bible College	Win: 6-0
CPAC/ACCA	Oct. 10	Canadian Mennonite University	Draw: 0-0
NCCAA	Oct. 13	Northland Baptist	Loss: 0-3
CPAC	Oct. 16	College U. de St. Boniface	Win: 11-2

=== 2007 CPAC Championships ===
Winnipeg, Manitoba

Game	Date	Opponent	Result
Semi-Final	Oct. 20	College U. de St. Boniface	Win: 7-0
Final	Oct. 21	Canadian Mennonite University	Win: 2-1 (OT)

=== 2007 NCCAA Regionals ===
Otterburne, Manitoba

Game	Date	Opponent	Result
Semi-Final	Oct. 26	North Central University	Win: 4-0
Final	Oct. 27	Crown College	Win: 1-0

=== 2007 NCCAA Nationals ===
Kissimmee, Florida

Date	Opponent	Result	
Nov. 9	Philadelphia	Loss: 0-1 (OT)	
Nov. 10	Hillsdale Baptist	Win: 0-0 (4-1 PKs)	
5th Place Final	Nov. 12	Northland Baptist	Loss: 0-6

== Women's Soccer ==
2007 NCCAA North Central Regional Finalists
2007 NCCAA Nationals: 3rd Place
2007 CPAC Champions

=== 2006 Regular Season (NCCAA/CPAC) ===
Conference	Date	Opponent	Result
NCCAA	Sept. 8	Crown College	Loss: 1-2
NCCAA	Sept. 9	Crown College	Loss: 0-1
NCCAA	Sept. 21	Faith Baptist	Win: 8-0
NCCAA	Sept. 22	Faith Baptist	Win: 3-0
CPAC	Sept. 25	College U. de St. Boniface	Win: 10-0
NCAA II	Sept. 26	Bemidji State University	Loss: 0-10
CPAC	Sept. 27	Canadian Mennonite University	Win: 2-0
NCAA II	Sept. 29	Minnesota State - Moorhead	Loss: 0-7
Exhibition	Sept. 30	Alumni	Win: 1-0
NCAA III	Oct. 4	University of Wisconsin Superior	Win: 3-2 (OT)
NCCAA	Oct. 5	North Central University	Win: 3-1
CPAC	Oct. 9	Canadian Mennonite University	Win: 3-2
NCAA II	Oct. 10	Bemidji State University	Loss 0-3
NCCAA	Oct. 13	Northland Baptist	Win: 2-1
NCAA II	Oct. 15	University of Minnesota - Crookston	Loss: 0-5

=== 2007 CPAC Championships ===
Winnipeg, Manitoba

Game	Date	Opponent	Result
Final	Oct. 21	Canadian Mennonite University	Win: 2-1

=== 2007 NCCAA Regionals ===
Otterburne, Manitoba

Game	Date	Opponent	Result
Semi-Final	Oct. 26	Faith Baptist	Win: 10-0
Final	Oct. 27	Crown College	Loss: 0-3

=== 2007 NCCAA Nationals ===
Kissimmee, Florida

Date	Opponent	Result	
Nov. 9	Southeastern University	Win: 0-0 (3-2 PKs)	
Nov. 10	Philadelphia Biblical University	Loss: 0-3	
3rd Place Final	Nov. 12	Manhattan Christian College	Win: 1-0 (OT)

== Women's Volleyball ==
2006 NIAC Champions

=== NCCAA Pre-Season Tourney (September 8–9) ===
Minneapolis, Minnesota

Date	Opponent	Result
Sept. 8	Presentation College	Loss: 0-3
Sept. 8	Crown College	Loss: 0-3
Sept. 9	Pillsbury College	Win: 3-0
Sept. 9	Pillsbury College	Win: 3-0

Sept. 21: vs. Trinity Baptist (NCCAA) Win: 3-1

=== Trinity Invitational Tournament (September 22–23) ===
Ellendale, North Dakota

Date	Opponent	Result
Sept. 22	Presentation College (NCCAA)	Loss: 2-3
Sept. 22	Trinity Baptist (NCCAA)	Win: 3-2
Sept. 22	Crossroads (NIAC)	Win: 3-0
Sept. 23	St Cloud (NIAC)	Win: 3-1

=== Providence Invitationanl Tournament (September 30–31) ===
Steinbach, Manitoba

Date	Opponent	Result
Sept. 30	Canadian Mennonite University (CPAC)	Win: 3-1
Sept. 30	North Central University (NCCAA)	Win: 3-0
Sept. 31	Red River College (CPAC)	Win: 3-0
Sept. 31	Northland Community College (NJCA)	Win: 3-0

Oct. 4: @ Canadian Mennonite University (CPAC) Win: 3-0

Oct. 11: vs. Canadian Mennonite University (CPAC) Win: 3-0

=== NIAC Championships (October 13–14) ===
Owatonna, Minnesota

Date	Opponent	Result
Oct. 13	Pillsbury College (NCCAA)	Win: 3-1
Oct. 13	Trinity Baptist (NCCAA)	Win: 3-0
Oct. 14	Trinity Baptist (NCCAA)	Win: 3-0

=== Red River College Tournament (October 20–21) ===
Winnipeg, Manitoba

Date	Opponent	Result
Oct. 20	Canadian Mennonite University (CPAC)	Win: 2-1
Oct. 20	College U. de St. Boniface (CPAC)	Win: 2-0
Oct. 21	Red River College (CPAC)	Loss: 1-2
Oct. 21	Assiniboine Community College (CPAC)	Win: 2-0
Oct. 21	Canadian Mennonite University (CPAC)	Win: 2-0
Oct. 21	Red River College (CPAC)	Loss: 1-2

=== NCCA Regional Championships (October 27–28) ===
Ankeny, Iowa

Date	Opponent	Result
Oct. 27	Faith Baptist	Win: 3-2
Oct. 28	North Central University	Loss: 2-3
Oct. 14	Faith Baptist	Loss: 2-3

== Men's Volleyball ==
2007 NIVC Conference Champions

Jan. 24 @ College U. de St. Boniface (CPAC) Win: 3-0

Jan. 30 vs College U. de St. Boniface (CPAC) Win: 3-1

=== Chaos In The Cornfield (NIRSA Div-1) (February 3) ===
Iowa State University: Aimes, Iowa

Game	Opponent	Result
Round Robin	St. Ambrose University	Win: 2-1
Round Robin	Iowa State University	Win: 2-0
Round Robin	University of Iowa	Win: 2-0
Quarter-Final	St. Ambrose University	Win: 2-0
Semi-Final	Iowa State University	Win: 2-0
Final	St. Cloud State University	Win: 2-0

=== Tourney On The Tundra (February 24–25) ===
North Dakota State University: Fargo, North Dakota Finished: 1st Place

Opponent	Result
U. of Wisconsin River Falls	Win: 2-0
U. of Minnesota Twin Cities	Win: 2-0
NDSU Green	Loss: 1-2
Bethel University	Win: 2-0
NDSU Green	Win: 2-0
NDSU Green	Win: 2-0

=== UCF Spring Shootout (NIRSA Div-1) (March 10–11) ===
University of Central Florida: Orlando, Florida

Opponent	Result
Lehigh University	Win: 2-0
Miami University	Win: 2-0
Team Edgar	Win: 2-1
Club F-1	Loss: 0-2
Emerald Coast	Win: 2-0
University of Central Florida	Loss: 0-2

=== NIVC Conference Championships (March 30 - April 1) ===
Michigan Technological University: Houghton, Michigan

Game	Opponent	Result
Round Robin	U. of Wisconsin River Falls B	Win: 2-0
Round Robin	U. of Wisconsin Eau Claire B	Win: 2-0
Round Robin	U. of Wisconsin River Falls A	Win: 2-0
Round Robin	Michigan Tech	Win: 2-0
Round Robin	Bethel University	Win: 2-0
A Final	U. of Wisconsin Eau Claire A	Win: 2-0
AB Final	U. of Wisconsin Eau Claire A	Loss: 1-2
Championship Final	U. of Wisconsin Eau Claire A	Win: 2-0

=== NIRSA National Championships (April 12–14) ===
Louisville, Kentucky

Game	Opponent	Result
Round 1 Pool Play	Eastern Illinois	Win: 2-1
Round 1 Pool Play	State University of New York-Albany	Win: 2-0
Round 1 Pool Play	Westchester University	Win: 2-0
Round 2 Pool Play	Georgetown University	Win: 2-0
Round 2 Pool Play	Baldwin Wallace University	Win: 2-0
Sweet 16	University of Wisconsin Lacrosse	Win: 2-0
Quarter-Final	Bethel University	Win: 2-0
Semi-Final	Augustana College	Win: 2-0
Championship	Ohio Northern	Loss: 0-2

== Men's basketball ==
=== 2006-2007 regular season ===
Date	Opponent	Result
Nov. 17	Pillsbury Bible College	Loss: 67-110
Nov. 18	Pillsbury College	Loss: 54-104
Nov. 24	Red River College	Loss: 80-88
Nov. 30	Faith Baptist	Loss: 67-93
Dec. 1	North Central University	Loss: 62-110
Dec. 2	Crown College	Loss: 54-98
Jan. 5	University of Winnipeg Jr. Wesmen	Loss: 46-80
Jan. 6	Red River College	Loss: 36-93
Jan. 12	AFLBS	Loss: 63-83
Jan. 13	AFLBS	Loss: 72-73
Jan. 19	Trinity Bible College	Loss: 80-102
Jan. 20	Trinity Bible College	Loss: 85-95
Jan. 26	Crossroads College	Win: 57-50
Jan. 27	Crossroads College	Win: 76-61
Feb. 1	Alexandria Tech	Loss: 69-83
Feb. 2	St. Cloud Tech	Loss: 70-96
Feb. 3	St. Cloud Tech	Loss: 64-71
Feb. 8	Alexandria Tech	Loss: 90-96
Feb. 9	Oak Hills Christian College	Loss: 66-91
Feb. 10	Oak Hills Christian College	Loss: 75-92

=== NCCAA Regional Championships (February 15–17) ===
Owatonna, Minnesota

Opponent	Result
Faith Baptist	Loss: 67-82

=== NIAC Conference Tournament (February 22–24) ===
Winnipeg, Manitoba

Opponent	Result
Trinity Bible College	Loss: 86-92
Oak Hills Christian College	Win: 74-66
Alexandria Tech	Loss: 54-56

=== ACCA National Tournament (March 1–3) ===
Bethany, Oklahoma

Opponent	Result
Champion Baptist	Loss: 67-80
Arlington Baptist	Win: 78-69

== Women's basketball ==
2007 NIAC Champions
2007 3rd Place ACCA
2007 NCCAA North Central Regional Finalists

=== 2006-2007 regular season ===
Date	Opponent	Result
Nov. 17	Pillsbury Bible College	Win: 62-37
Nov. 18	Pillsbury College	Win: 67-39
Nov. 22	Canadian Mennonite University	Loss: 57-60
Nov. 30	Faith Baptist	Win: 60-47
Dec. 1	North Central University	Loss: 49-68
Dec. 2	Crown College	Loss: 51-52
Dec. 6	Northlands CC	Win: 62-58
Dec. 9	Northlands CC	Loss: 64-86
Jan. 5	Swoowh	Loss: 59-76
Jan. 6	Red River College	Win: 54-40
Jan. 12	AFLBS	Win: 66-45
Jan. 13	AFLBS	Win: 69-40
Jan. 19	Trinity Bible College	Win: 71-59
Jan. 20	Trinity Bible College	Win: 71-64
Jan. 26	Crossroads College	Win: 56-35
Jan. 27	Crossroads College	Win: 56-40
Feb. 2	Red River College	Win: 54-32
Feb. 3	Canadian Mennonite University	Loss: 58-61
Feb. 8	Swoosh	Loss: 48-73

=== NCCAA Regional Championships (February 15–17) ===
Owatonna, Minnesota

Game	Opponent	Result
Semi-Final	Crown College	Win: 59-50
Final	North Central University	Loss: 63-71

=== NIAC Conference Tournament (February 22–24) ===
Winnipeg, Manitoba

Game	Opponent	Result
Semi-Final	AFLBS	Win: 61-42
Final	Trinity Bible College	Win: 66-56

=== ACCA National Tournament (March 1–3) ===
Bethany, Oklahoma

Game	Opponent	Result
Semi-Final	Hillsdale Free Will Baptist	Loss: 46-61
3rd Place	Canadian Mennonite University	Win: 69-50

== Men's Hockey ==
2008-2009	Provhockey.tk	
Date	Opponent	Result
Oct. 31	Assiniboine Community College	Tie: 1-1
Nov. 16	Canadian Mennonite University	TBD

2007-2008
Date	Opponent	Result
Nov. 17	Canadian Mennonite University	Loss: 2-8
Nov. 23	Assiniboine Community College	Loss: 1-4
Dec. 1	Assiniboine Community College	Loss: 3-4
Dec. 8	Canadian Mennonite University	Win: 4-1
Jan. 12	Assiniboine Community College	Tie: 1-1
Feb. 1	Assiniboine Community College	Win: 7-6
Feb. 2	Canadian Mennonite University	Tie: 4-4
Feb. 6	Bemidji State JV (Exhibition)	Loss: 2-10
Feb. 15	Carleton College (Exhibition)	Loss: 2-9
Feb. 16	Carleton College (Exhibition)	Loss: 1-3
Feb. 23	Canadian Mennonite University	Loss: 1-5

=== 2007-2008 CPAC Final Four ===
Game	Opponent	Result
Semi-Final	Assiniboine Community College	Win: 2-1
Final	Canadian Mennonite University	Loss: 3-4
