= Fort Rouge, Winnipeg =

Neighbourhood in Winnipeg, Manitoba, Canada

Coordinates: 49°52′00″N 97°09′00″W

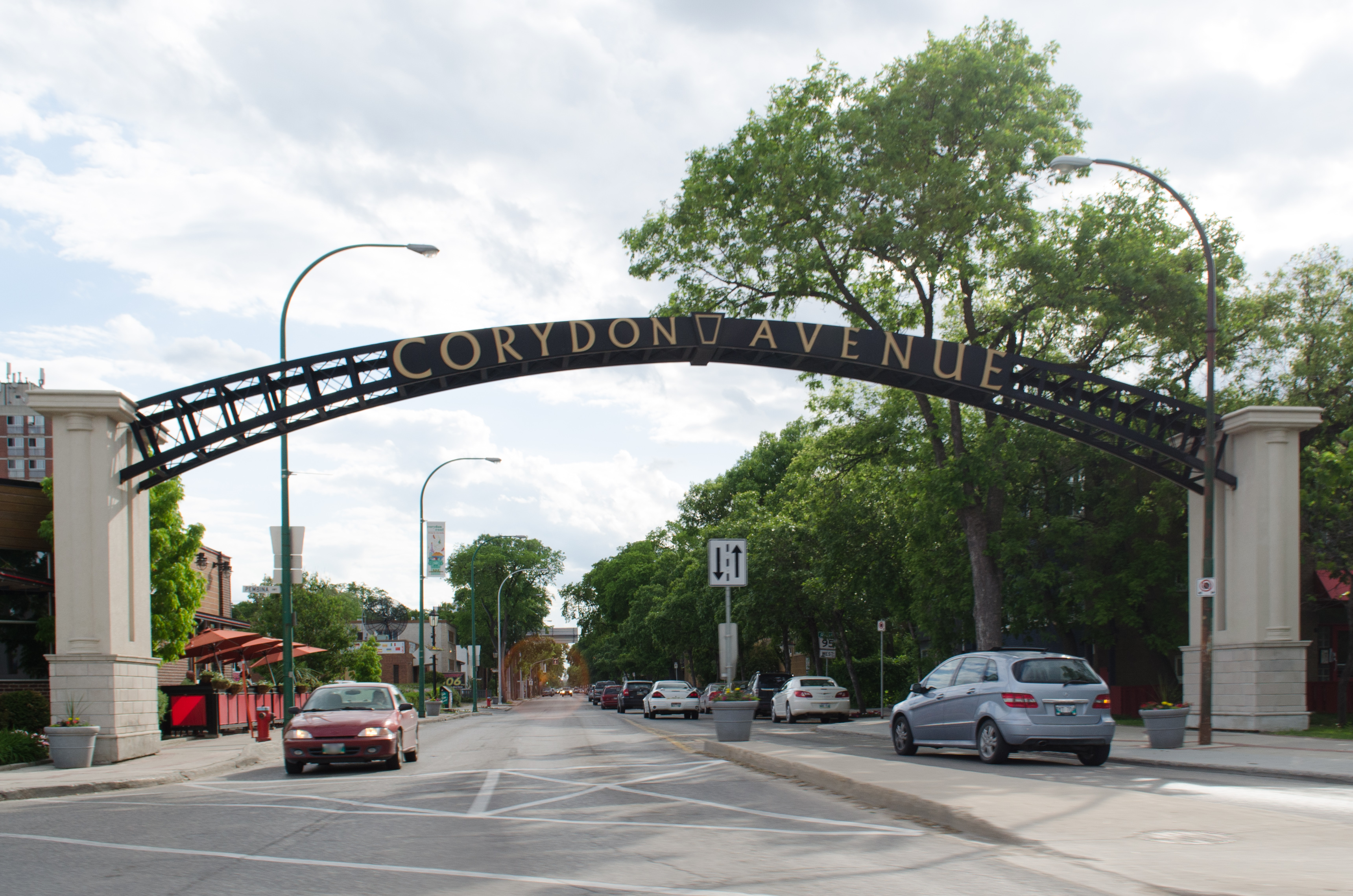
Corydon Avenue arch

Fort Rouge is a district of Winnipeg, Manitoba, in Canada. Located in the south-central part of the city, it is bounded on the north by the Assiniboine River, on the east and south by the Red River, and on the west by Stafford Street and Pembina Highway.

It composes part of the city ward of Fort Rouge-East Fort Garry, as well as belonging to the provincial electoral district of Fort Rouge, and the federal electoral district of Winnipeg South Centre. Fort Rouge is not a discrete census district, so its population cannot be easily obtained through census records; the 2006 combined population of Fort Rouge and the neighbouring district of River Heights was 56,505.

Notable people from Fort Rouge include Kimberly Prost, judge of the International Criminal Court.

== History ==
The district was named after Fort Rouge, a fort built on the Assiniboine River in approximately 1738 by Sieur Louis Damours de Louvières, a lieutenant of the Canadian explorer Pierre Gaultier de Varennes, sieur de La Vérendrye. It is not known if the neighbourhood is built on the site of the fortification.

The area prior to 1880 consisted of a few small farms and woodlots. In 1880, a bridge was built across the Assiniboine River south from Main Street; the following year, another was constructed south along Pembina Road (later known as Osborne Street). Originally known as St. Boniface West, the area was annexed by the City of Winnipeg in 1882.

With the bridge in place to the city, a middle class residential area developed. Most houses in this area were quite modest in size and cost, although during the 1890s and 1900s mansions could be found on Roslyn Road, Wellington Crescent, and River Avenue. Due to its proximity to central Winnipeg and the presence of the Park Line streetcar, Fort Rouge was attractive to a variety of families of the middle and commercial classes as well as the more prosperous from the skilled trades. Most residents were of British Canadian backgrounds. This sense of community was reflected in the large churches that were constructed in the early 1900s along Nassau Street. Notable residents of the time include three victims of the RMS Titanic disaster: real estate developer Mark Fortune, his son Charles Fortune, and banker Thomson Beattie. Another Titanic victim, John Hugo Ross, gave his name to Hugo Street in Fort Rouge some years before his death, while a fifth victim, Eaton's employee George Graham, is buried in St. Marys Cemetery (in St. Marys, Ontario). Immigration agent and legislator William Hespeler also resided in Fort Rouge.

The Canadian Northern Railway shops and yards were also located in Fort Rouge. Working-class neighbourhoods developed around the yards. Many of the residents were able to walk the short distance to work. A few factories and warehouses appeared alongside the tracks and near the Red River as well. The yards are still in operation under the aegis of the Canadian National Railway and Via Rail, although some of the original yards were closed and the land ceded to the City of Winnipeg, which built a large bus garage on the lands.

From the 1950s to the 1980s dozens of high-rise apartment blocks, many over 25 storeys, were built in and around Osborne Village. This is currently Western Canada's second most densely populated neighbourhood. In the 1990s Corydon Avenue was redeveloped and is now one of Winnipeg's most important cultural and night-life areas.

Fort Rouge includes many neighbourhoods. These include Lord Roberts, Riverview, Ebby-Wentworth, Earl Grey, McMillan, and River-Osborne.

== Recreation and living ==
Public schools in Fort Rouge are administered by the Winnipeg School Division.

The only major health care facility in Fort Rouge is the Riverview Health Centre, located in the Riverview neighbourhood. St. Mary's Cemetery, a Catholic burial ground dating to the 19th century, is located on Osborne Street.

=== Sports ===
The Fort Rouge district shares the Fort Garry/Fort Rouge Twins hockey team with the district of Fort Garry. The team plays out of the Century Arena in Fort Garry and are members of the Manitoba Major Junior Hockey League.

The area is the home of the Fort Rouge Curling Club and Wildwood Golf Course.

Team	Founded	League	Arena	Championships
Fort Garry/Fort Rouge Twins	1970	MMJHL	Century Arena	6

== Crime rates ==
The table below shows the crime rates of various crimes in each of the Fort Rouge neighbourhoods. The crime data spans 5 years from the year 2017 to the year 2021. The rates are crimes per 100,000 residents per year.

Crime Rates per 100,000 people in Fort Rouge Neighbourhoods, 2017-2021
Neighbourhood	Pop.	Homicide	Rate (Note: Rate per 100,000 people per year: Figure is calculated by dividing the total incidences of a crime by the neighbourhood population, then multiplying by 100,000, and then dividing by 5, as the data spans 5 years)	Robbery	Rate	Agr. Aslt. (Note: Aggravated assault: Includes assaults which cause bodily harm or utilize weapons; includes the following categories given on Winnipeg CrimeMaps: aggravated assault, aggravated sexual assault, assault against peace officer, assault with weapon or causing bodily harm, attempted murder, firearms offences, sexual assault with a weapon.)	Rate	Cmn. Aslt (Note: Common assault: Excludes assaults which cause bodily harm or utilize weapons; includes the following categories given on Winnipeg CrimeMaps: assault against peace officer, common assault, other assaults, sexual assault.)	Rate	Utt. Threat (Note: Abbreviated from: uttering threats)	Rate	Property	Rate
Crescentwood	2,715	0	0.0	16	117.9	17	125.2	32	235.7	16	117.9	1312	9,664.8
Earl Grey	4,260	1	4.7	48	225.4	69	323.9	105	493.0	23	108.0	1654	7,765.3
Ebby-Wentworth	795	0	0.0	23	578.6	6	150.9	19	478.0	10	251.6	469	11,798.7
Grant Park	2,725	1	7.3	57	418.3	20	146.8	54	396.3	34	249.5	1448	10,627.5
Lord Roberts	4,965	1	4.0	33	132.9	56	225.6	126	507.6	38	153.1	1308	5,268.9
McMillan	3,445	1	5.8	34	197.4	71	412.2	105	609.6	31	180.0	1779	10,328.0
River-Osborne	4,750	7	29.5	97	408.4	122	513.7	235	989.5	55	231.6	2342	9,861.1
Riverview	4,270	1	4.7	41	192.0	20	93.7	52	243.6	20	93.7	945	4,426.2
Rockwood	4,245	0	0.0	20	94.2	16	75.4	24	113.1	8	37.7	1194	5,625.4
Roslyn	4,550	0	0.0	90	395.6	19	83.5	55	241.8	13	57.1	1594	7,006.6
Fort Rouge	36,720	12	6.5	459	250.0	416	226.6	807	439.5	248	135.1	14,045	7,649.8
