= St. Vital Victorias =

- City: Winnipeg, Manitoba Canada
- League: Manitoba Major Junior Hockey League
- Founded: 1975
- Home arena: St. Vital Centennial Arena
- Colors: Red, Black, White
- Owner: Dwayne Joseph
- Head coach: Tyler Anderson (2023-present)

The St. Vital Victorias are a junior ice hockey team based in Winnipeg, Manitoba, Canada. They are part of the Manitoba Major Junior Hockey League (MMJHL).

== History ==
The St. Vital Victorias were named in the memory of Company Sergeant-Major John Robert Osborn, V. C. Originally from Norfolk, England, Osborn settled in St. Vital and served with the 1st Battalion of the Winnipeg Grenadiers in World War II. On September 19, 1941, during an attack against the Japanese at Jardine's Lookout and Mount Butler, Hong Kong, the enemy began to throw grenades. Osborn displayed the highest quality of heroism and sacrifice. After picking up several live grenades and hurling them back at the enemy, he threw himself on a grenade in order to save the lives of his comrades. Osborn was posthumously awarded the Victoria Cross, the British Empire's highest military decoration for bravery and gallantry.

Set on a black hockey puck background, the white St. V. is joined with the red V for "Victorias". The positioning of the V's symbolizes the unity of the Junior Hockey team with affiliated Community Clubs, the AA Vic teams, and the community in general. The white colour of the St. V. symbolizes the purity associated with the name SAINT. The red V symbolizes the courage of the man whose confirmed honour promoted the name of the team. The flow action motion of the stylized letters symbolizes the spirit of the game of hockey, and, specifically, of Victoria teams.

The St. Vital Minor Hockey Association was created in 1972, to administer minor hockey in the area. Three years later, the Junior Victorias were formed, as the club joined the Manitoba Major Junior Hockey League (MMJHL) for the team's inaugural campaign in 1975-76.

The Junior Vics fall under the regulations of Hockey Manitoba, operating as a community-owned club. St. Vital is located in the southeastern section of Winnipeg, and the Association comprises the Dakota, Glenlee, Glenwood, Greendell, Norberry, and Windsor Community Centres.

== Season-by-season record ==
Note: GP = Games Played, W = Wins, L = Losses, T = Ties, OTL = Overtime Losses, GF = Goals for, GA = Goals against

Season	Wins	Loses	Ties	OTL	GF	GA	Points	Finish	Playoffs
1975-76	13	21	2	-	174	238	28	7th	
1976-77	10	29	3	-	179	270	23	6th	
1977-78	10	30	2	-	175	258	22	7th	
1978-79	10	29	3	-	148	223	23	7th	
1979-80	17	23	2	-	209	247	36	6th	
1980-81	29	13	0	-	298	213	58	2nd	
1981-82	24	16	1	-	243	208	49	3rd	
1982-83	10	31	1	-	215	355	21	8th	
1983-84	14	25	1	-	241	278	29	9th	DNQ
1984-85	1	38	1	-	115	350	4	9th	DNQ
1985-86	18	22	2	-	249	267	38	6th	
1986-87	26	15	1	-	277	229	52	2nd	
1987-88	11	30	1	-	184	267	23	7th	
1988-89	24	16	2	-	242	201	50	3rd	
1989-90	14	26	2	-	215	240	30	6th	
1990-91	27	14	1	-	244	198	55	1st	
1991-92	3	39	0	-	148	362	6	8th	
1992-93	14	27	1	-	201	302	29	6th	
1993-94	21	20	1	-	247	208	43	4th	
1994-95	21	21	0	-	224	216	42	4th	
1995-96	30	11	1	-	271	189	61	2nd	
1996-97	24	17	1	-	210	190	49	3rd	
1997-98	19	22	1	-	230	218	39	6th	
1998-99	26	15	1	0	283	185	53	2nd	
1999-00	21	20	1	0	187	179	43	5th	
2000-01	19	20	1	2	159	155	41	5th	
2001-02	28	13	1	3	198	154	60	4th	
2002-03	25	13	4	3	197	158	57	3rd	
2003-04	41	1	2	1	262	98	85	1st	Jack McKenzie Trophy winner
2004-05	37	4	4	0	253	105	78	2nd	
2005-06	34	8	1	2	235	122	71	1st	
2006-07	19	23	2	1	175	180	41	7th	
2007-08	27	14	3	1	187	120	58	4th	
2008-09	27	15	-	3	221	139	57	4th	Lost quarterfinal
2009-10	34	8	-	3	203	96	71	3rd	
2010-11	22	20	-	3	174	168	47	5th	
2011-12	22	16	-	2	147	147	46	5th	
2012-13	19	22	-	4	179	170	42	8th	Lost quarterfinal
2013-14	15	27	-	3	157	208	33	9th	DNQ
2014-15	22	17	-	6	154	160	50	5th of 10	Lost quarterfinal, 3-4 (Hawks)
2015-16	24	17	-	4	164	154	52	5th of 10	Lost quarterfinal, 3-4 (Jets)
2016-17	22	17	-	6	177	187	50	7th of 10	Lost quarterfinal, 2-4 (Jets)
2017-18	22	22	-	2	165	186	46	6th of 10	Lost quarterfinal, 1-4 (Railer Express)
2018-19	29	13	-	3	189	158	61	3rd of 10	Lost quarterfinal, 3-4 (Railer Express)
2019-20	29	10	-	6	188	129	64	2nd of 10	Playoffs cancelled due to COVID
2020-21	2	3	-	0	18	19	4	COVID	
2021-22	28	11	-	6	190	150	62	4th of 10	Lost quarterfinal, 2-4 (Jr. Hockey Club)
2022-23	26	16	-	3	191	182	55	4th of 10	Won quarterfinal, 4-3 (Twins); Won Semifinals 4-3 (Hawks); Lost League Finals 0-4 (Canucks)
2023-24	21	16	-	8	164	175	50	5th of 10	tbd quarterfinal, 0-1 (Twins)
2024-25	24	17	3	1	170	164	52	5th of 10	Lost quarterfinal, 0-4 (Riels)
2025-26	11	30	2	2	149	209	26	9th of 10	Did Not Qualify

== Championships ==
=== Jack Mackenzie Trophy (playoffs) ===
- 2003-04

=== Art Moug Trophy (regular season) ===
- 1990-91, 2003–04, 2005–06
