= Gwen Smid =

Canadian writer of picture books (born 1979)

Gwen Smid (born 1979 in Winnipeg, Manitoba, Canada) is a Canadian writer of picture books.

== Writing ==
Smid's first book, Mary's Atlas: Mary Meets Manitoba, was published in 2008 by Peanut Butter Press, and secured a place on McNally Robinson's bestseller list for months. It depicts a young girl's exploration of Manitoba in search of the Golden Boy's lost torch. This was followed by 2010's Mary's Atlas: Mary Meets Ontario.

Smid's articles have also appeared in sources such as The Globe and Mail, The Ottawa Citizen, and various academic journals.

Smid's story, "Sand" was published in Inspiration Planet Earth: Our Natural Environment is Life, the Canadian Authors Association's 2011 anthology.

== Personal life ==
Smid attended Providence College (Otterburne, Manitoba) from 1997–2000 and then attended the University of Manitoba (Winnipeg) from 2000–2003. Smid earned her Bachelor of Arts and Bachelor of Education degrees. Smid is a high school teacher and author.

== Bibliography ==
- "Blue Skies Over Auschwitz." Article. The Ottawa Citizen, 2015.
- "Sinner's Corner." Article. Geez Magazine, Issue 37, 2015.
- "Sand." Short Story. Inspiration Planet Earth: The Natural Environment is Life, 2011.
- "I've Learned to Love Dandelions." Article. The Globe and Mail, 2010.
- Mary's Atlas: Mary Meets Ontario. Picture Book. Peanut Butter Press, 2010, ISBN 978-0-9865329-1-7.
- "Duped by Grandma." Article. The Globe and Mail, 2009.
- "No Longer a Rookie?" Article. The Manitoba Association for Teachers of English Journal, 2009.
- "Bringing the Boreal Forest into a Prairie Classroom." Article. The Manitoba Social Studies Teachers Association, 2009.
- "Igloo: What a Teacher Can Learn." Article. The Manitoba Association for Teachers of English Journal, 2009.
- Mary's Atlas: Mary Meets Manitoba. Picture Book. Peanut Butter Press, 2008, ISBN 978-0-9735579-4-7.
- "How We Met." Article. 2: A Magazine for Couples, 2005.
