= Bruno Zarrillo =

Italian-Canadian ice hockey player

- Born: September 5, 1966 (age 60) Winnipeg, Manitoba, Canada
- Height: 5 ft 11 in (180 cm)
- Weight: 170 lb (77 kg; 12 st 2 lb)
- Position: Left wing
- Shot: Right
- Played for: HC Bolzano (Serie A); HC Milano Vipers (Serie A); Kölner Haie (DEL); Nürnberg Ice Tigers (DEL); SC Bern (NLA); SC Langenthal (NLB); HC Sierre (NLB)
- National team: Italy
- Playing career: 1987–2004

Bruno Zarrillo (born September 5, 1966) is an Italian-Canadian retired professional ice hockey winger.

== Achievements ==
- 1987 - Manitoba Major Junior Hockey League Champion with River East Royal Knights
- 1988 - Manitoba Major Junior Hockey League Champion with River East Royal Knights
- 1990 - Serie A Champion with HC Bolzano
- 1995 - Serie A Champion with HC Bolzano
- 1997 - NLA Champion with SC Bern
- 2004 - Serie A Champion with HC Milano Vipers

== International play ==
Bruno Zarrillo played in the Olympics in 1992, 1994, 1998. Additionally he represented Italy in the World Championships ten times.
