= Zarrillo =

Zarrillo is a surname. Notable people with the surname include:

- Bonita Zarrillo (born 1965/66), Canadian politician
- Bruno Zarrillo (born 1966), Italian-Canadian ice hockey player
- Michele Zarrillo (born 1957), Italian singer-songwriter
