= Manitoba Colleges Athletic Conference =

Manitoba Colleges Athletic Conference (MCAC; French: Conférence athlétique des collèges du Manitoba), previously known as the Central Plains Athletic Conference, is an organization of college athletics in southern Manitoba, Canada.

Manitoba Colleges Athletic Conference sports include men's and women's in each of soccer, volleyball, and basketball. Historical sports included badminton, futsal, golf, hockey, and table tennis.

== Current members ==
| Institution | Location | Founded | Affiliation | Enrollment | Nickname |
|---|---|---|---|---|---|
| Assiniboine College | Brandon | 1961 | Public | 4,100 | Cougars |
| Brandon University | Brandon | 1890 | Public | 2,980 | Bobcats |
| Canadian Mennonite University | Winnipeg | 1999 | Private | 630 | Blazers |
| Providence University College | Otterburne | 1925 | Private | 325 | Pilots |
| Red River College Polytechnic | Winnipeg | 1938 | Public | 21,000 | Rebels |
| Université de Saint-Boniface | Winnipeg | 1818 | Private | 1,333 | Les Rouges |

== Former Members ==
| Institution | Location | Nickname | Sports |
|---|---|---|---|
| University of Winnipeg | Winnipeg, MB | College Wesmen | Men's & Women's Basketball; Men's & Women's Volleyball; Men's & Women's Soccer |
| Oak Hills Christian College | Bemidji, MN | Wolfpack | Men's & Women's Basketball |
| Steinbach Bible College | Steinbach, MB | Flames | Men's Soccer; Men's Basketball; Men's Hockey |
| Booth University College | Winnipeg, MB | Generals | Men's Basketball; Women's Volleyball |
| University College of the North (Formerly Keewatin Community College) | The Pas, MB | Badgers | Men's Hockey |
| Western Christian College | Dauphin, MB | Mustangs | Men's Basketball; Men's & Women's Volleyball |
