= Morris, Manitoba =

Morris
- Town
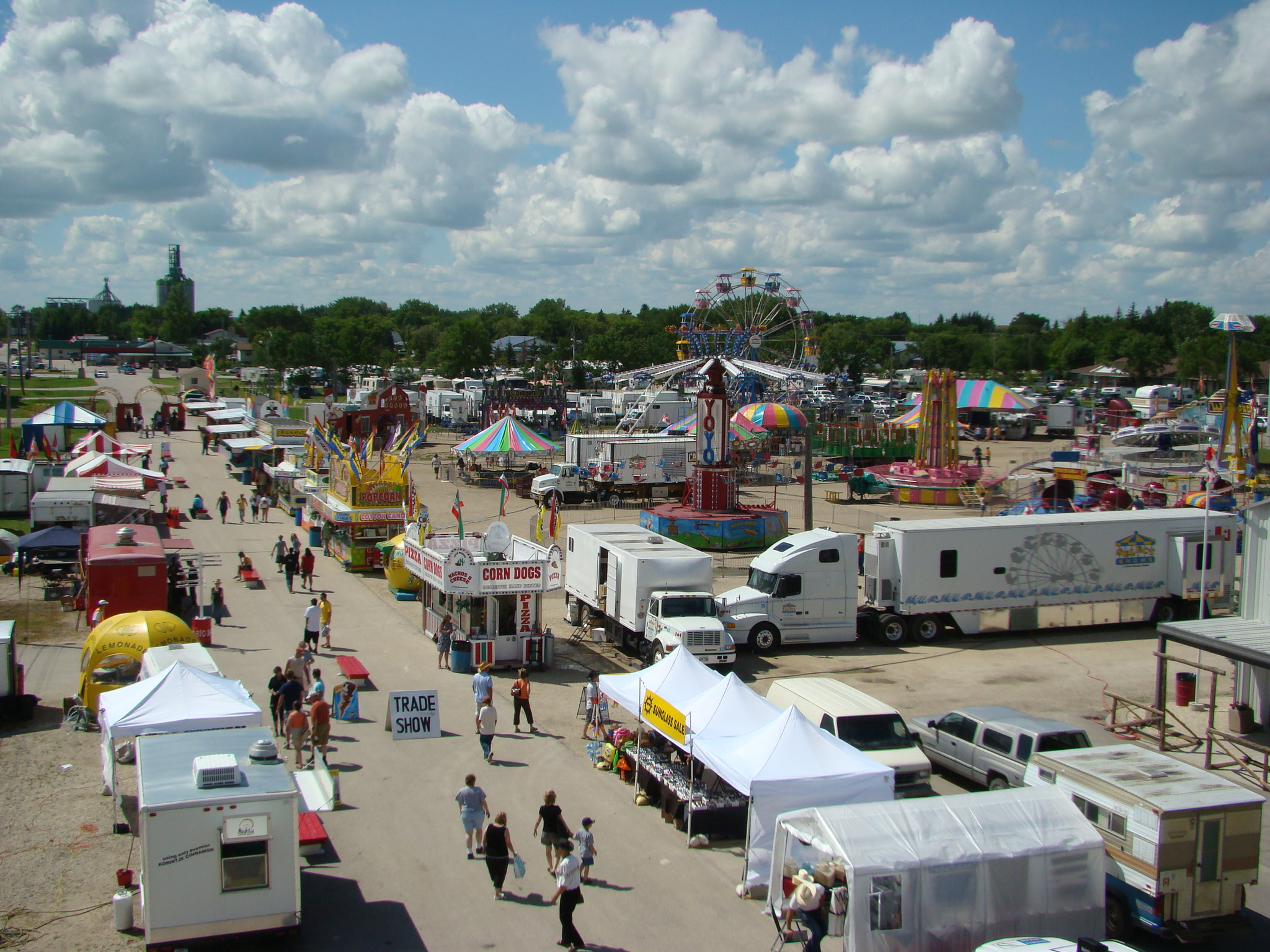
- The Manitoba Stampede and Exhibition in Morris

- Flag

- Town boundaries

- Location in Manitoba
- Coordinates: 49°21′18″N 97°21′54″W
- Country: Canada
- Province: Manitoba
- Region: No. 3
- Post office established: 1874
- Incorporated town: 1883
- Named for: Alexander Morris

Government
  - Governing body: Morris Town Council
  - MP (Portage-Lisgar): Branden Leslie (CPC)
  - MLA (Midland): Lauren Stone (PC)

Area
  - Total: 6.10 km^{2} (2.36 sq mi)

Population (2021)
  - Total: 1,975
  - Density: 309.1/km^{2} (801/sq mi)
- Time zone: UTC−6 (CST)
  - Summer (DST): UTC−5 (CDT)
- Area code: 204
- Website: Official website

Morris is a small town in the Pembina Valley region of Manitoba, Canada, located 51 km south of Winnipeg and 42 km north of Emerson. Morris is home to 1,885 people (2016). The town is named after Alexander Morris, the second Lieutenant Governor of Manitoba.

Highway 75, which turns into Interstate 29, is the major highway which runs from Winnipeg to Missouri. Morris is the only town where Highway 75 is called "Main Street". The town of Morris is mostly surrounded by the Rural Municipality of Morris, except for a relatively small eastern border with the northwest corner of the Rural Municipality of Montcalm, across the Red River of the North.

Morris is host to the annual Manitoba Stampede and Exhibition.

== History ==
The town has a very long history involving floods and fur trade companies. Fur traders started to settle in the Morris area in the late 18th century because of its strategic location along the Red River. By 1801, there were two fur-trading stations at the settlement, the North West Company and the XY Company. Barges came up and down the Red River, and the Red River ox carts that travelled between Fort Garry and the Pembina Settlement went right through Morris, and offered many opportunities for trade. (See Red River Trails)

By 1874, the ox carts began to carry settlers to the areas around the Scratching River (now the Morris River) and the population began to grow. The town of Morris was named after Alexander Morris, the second Lieutenant Governor of Manitoba, and was officially incorporated in 1883. In 1891, the town of Morris had a population of 286.

Morris is one of 18 communities in the Red River Valley of Manitoba surrounded by a ring dike. The first ring dike was built to protect the town from the 1966 Red River Flood, by the Canadian Army Engineers, the Mennonite Disaster Service and local volunteers. A permanent dike protected Morris during the 1997 Red River flood.

== Geography ==
The town of Morris lies in the middle of the Red River Valley. The shallow valley spreads for many kilometres to the east and west, but only rises a few metres at most. The land is remarkably flat. Repeated flooding in the past has left the valley floor covered in rich river silt. The fine black soils are some of the best-producing agricultural soils in the world. The Red River Valley is part of the remnants of the prehistoric Lake Agassiz, which was once much larger than Lake Superior, which is the biggest of the five Great Lakes.

== Demographics ==
In the 2021 Census of Population conducted by Statistics Canada, Morris had a population of 1,975 living in 826 of its 868 total private dwellings, a change of 4.8% from its 2016 population of 1,885. With a land area of 5.91 km^{2} (2.28 sq mi), it had a population density of 334.2/km^{2} (865.5/sq mi) in 2021.

In 2016, the median age was 38.8, slightly higher than the provincial average of 38.2.

Population by ethnic group, 2011
Ethnic group	Population	Percent
European	1,470	84%
Canadians	425	24.3%
First Nations	70	4%
Métis	55	3.1%
Asians	50	2.9%
Africans	0	0%
Total respondent population	1,750	

== Economy ==
The economy of Morris is based on agriculture. The town of Morris is a major service provider to the surrounding agricultural community. Currently, businesses and manufacturers in Morris produce and supply a variety of goods to both national and international markets.

== Attractions ==
=== Manitoba Stampede and Exhibition ===
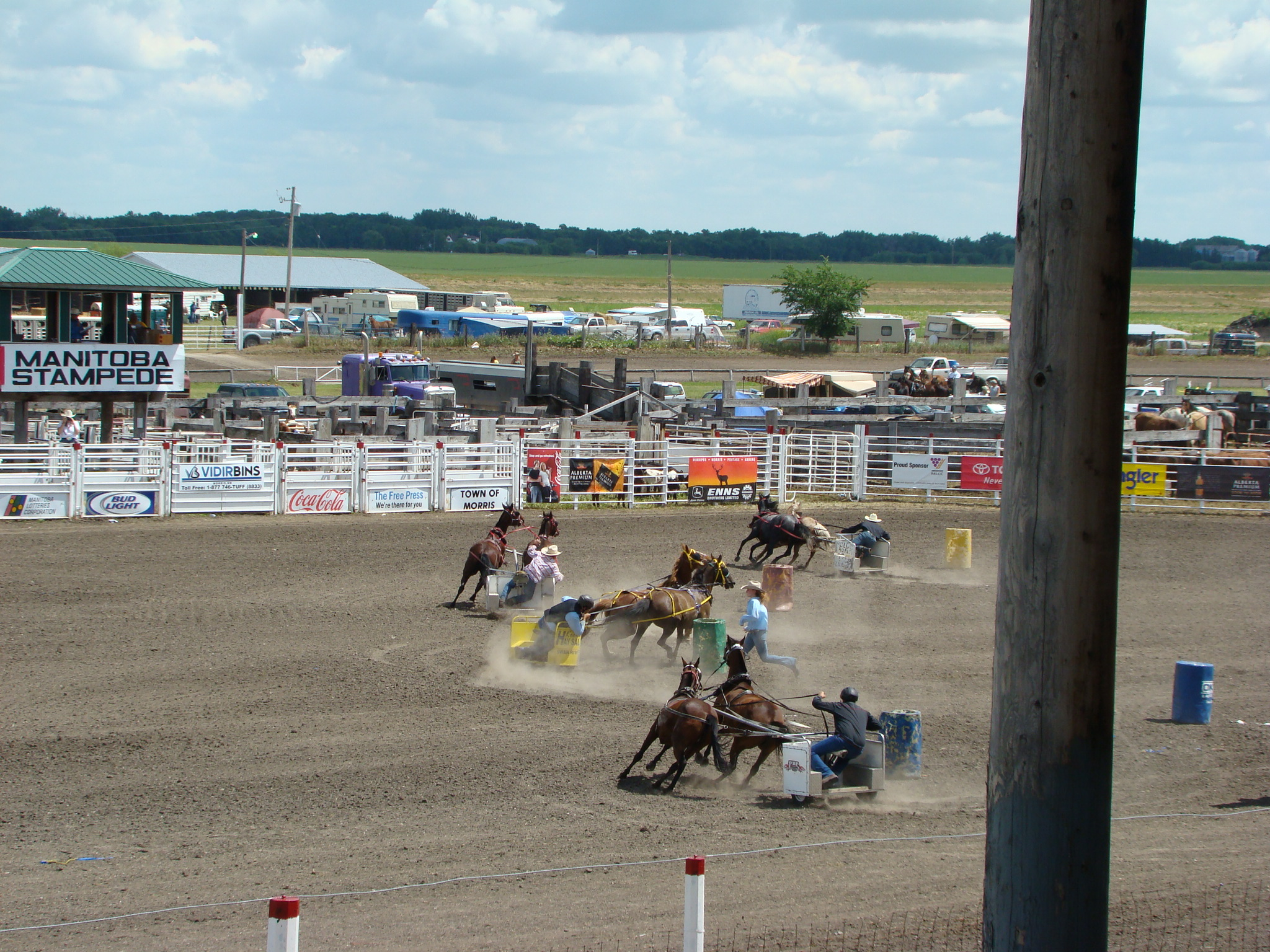
Manitoba Stampede 2008 in Morris

The town of Morris holds a variety of annual events, which brings many visitors to the community each year. Each July, the Valley Agricultural Society hosts the Manitoba Stampede and Exhibition, known as the Big "M". For four days, thousands of spectators and participants from across North America come to watch the competition. One of the largest dairy shows in the province, light and heavy horse shows, school work and home-craft competitions, commercial and craft displays, Loule's famous petting zoo, midway rides, free family entertainment, indoor cabaret Friday and Saturday evening featuring top country bands, community church service and the kids' pedal tractorpull on Sunday. The Manitoba Stampede and Exhibition is the largest professional rodeo east of Calgary, Alberta. The Valley Agricultural Society, formed in 1895, was originally established as an agriculture fair. This fair was combined with a professional rodeo in 1964 to become an annual event.

== Sports ==
Morris is the home of the Pembina Valley Twisters of the MMJHL having joined in 2001

The Morris Mavericks a high school hockey team in the Zone IV hockey league has enjoyed success winning multiple Zone IV championships and Provincial championships

Team	Founded	League	Arena	Championships
Pembina Valley Twisters	2001	MMJHL	Morris Multiplex	3
Morris Mavericks	2008	Zone IV	Morris Multiplex	5

== Transportation ==
Morris is located along PTH 75, which is the main route for Manitobans to get into the United States. Morris is also served by PTH 23, running east and west, providing access to much of southern Manitoba.

Morris is also served by two railroad companies. The first is the Canadian National Railway whose line runs north-south from Winnipeg to the Canadian-U.S. border. The second is the Canadian Pacific that has a branch which currently ends (it was formerly a line all of the way to the US border at Gretna) in Altona. The Southern Manitoba Railway which ran west from Morris for 80 miles was torn up in 2008, due to non-use.

== Climate ==
Morris

Climate chart (precipitation, max. and min. temperature)
J	F	M	A	M	J	J	A	S	O	N	D
25 −15 −17	17 −14 −17	30 −7 −11	48 14 −2	91 25 2	113 27 12	70 26 15	67 26 12	42 22 9	49 15 1	21 4 −4	20 −14 −16
- █ Average max. and min. temperatures in °C
- █ Precipitation totals in mm
Imperial conversion
J	F	M	A	M	J	J	A	S	O	N	D
1 5 1	0.7 7 1	1.2 19 12	1.9 57 28	3.6 77 36	4.4 81 54	2.8 79 59	2.6 79 54	1.7 72 48	1.9 59 34	0.8 39 25	0.8 7 3
- █ Average max. and min. temperatures in °F
- █ Precipitation totals in inches

== Notable people ==
- Sandra Birdsell, writer
- William Clubb, politician
- Paul P. Enns, theologian
- George Minaker, politician
- A. James Reimer, theologian
- Harry Shewman, politician

== See also ==
- List of francophone communities in Manitoba
