= Paul P. Enns =

Paul P. Enns (born June 17, 1937) is an evangelical Christian pastor, biblical scholar and writer who serves as a full-time minister at Idlewild Baptist Church in Lutz, Florida, and as adjunct professor at Southeastern Baptist Theological Seminary. He is notable as one of the translators of the updated New American Standard Bible and as the author of The Moody Handbook of Theology.

== Early life and education ==
Enns was born in Morris, Manitoba, where he graduated from Morris Collegiate Institute. Both he and his wife Helen (née Klassen) have a "Russian" Mennonite background. He went on to earn a diploma in architectural drafting from Manitoba Institute of Technology (1964), and then his B.R.E. from Winnipeg Bible College. He completed his graduate work, both his Th.M. (1973) and Th.D. (1979) at Dallas Theological Seminary. He was ordained at Grace Bible Church in Dallas, Texas on May 27, 1973.

== Academic career ==
Enns began his teaching career at Winnipeg Bible College (1973–74). He taught Bible exposition at Dallas Theological seminary for one year (1976–77), and then became assistant professor of Bible at Northwestern College (1977–80). Following this, Enns moved to Jacksonville, Florida, to serve as chairman of Bible and theology and dean at Luther Rice Seminary (1980–84), and then associate professor of biblical studies at Talbot Theological Seminary (1984–87). Upon moving back to Florida, he took on the role of provost and dean, organizing the seminary program in the graduate school of Trinity College of Florida, which in 1994 became the Tampa Bay Extension of Dallas Theological Seminary. At that time, Enns went on to develop a similar seminary program at his church, which was soon converted to an extension of Southeastern Baptist Theological Seminary.

== Pastoral career ==
Enns first began in ministry as an assistant pastor while he was still pursuing his undergraduate degree. He also served as a pastor following his graduation, then as minister of Christian education during his first teaching stint in Manitoba, and later as an interim pastor for a year in Minnesota. Since 1996, he has been pastor of biblical training and leadership development at Idlewild Baptist Church.

== Personal life ==
Enns was married to Helen for 45 years until her death in 2005. Together they had two sons, Terry and Jeremy. Enns has five grandchildren.

== Publications ==
In addition to The Moody Handbook of Theology, Enns is also the author of Manners & Customs of Bible Times (2000), Approaching God: Daily Reflections for Growing Christians (2003), and Heaven Revealed: What Is It Like? What Will We Do?... And 11 Other Things You've Wondered About (2011), and "Everything Happens for a Reason, God's Purposes in a World Gone Bad" (2012), along with a number of biblical commentaries, including four volumes in the Bible Commentary Series.
