= Southern Manitoba Railway =

Railway in Canada

Southern Manitoba Railway (reporting mark SMNR) was incorporated in July 1999 in Winnipeg, Manitoba, Canada. The railway was 80 miles (128 kilometers) long and provides transportation for the movement of grain and grain products. SMNR interchanged traffic with the Canadian National Railway at Morris, Manitoba.

The railway originally consisted of three ex CN subdivisions, the Miami (60 miles), Carman (40 miles) and Hartney (41 miles) subdivisions. The Hartney subdivision and a portion of the Carman subdivision was abandoned and removed before 2007.

As of the fall of 2007, the US-owned Southern Manitoba Railway was defunct. The track has been ripped up and sold for scrap metal, and the ties were removed and trucked away. All of the small farming communities in Southern Manitoba which depended on this railway for movement of their grain products now have to rely on trucking instead.

The last two miles of the Miami subdivision out of Morris were retained and are used by Cargill in Morris to store and switch rail cars.
