= St. James Civic Centre =

Community sports venue in southern Manitoba

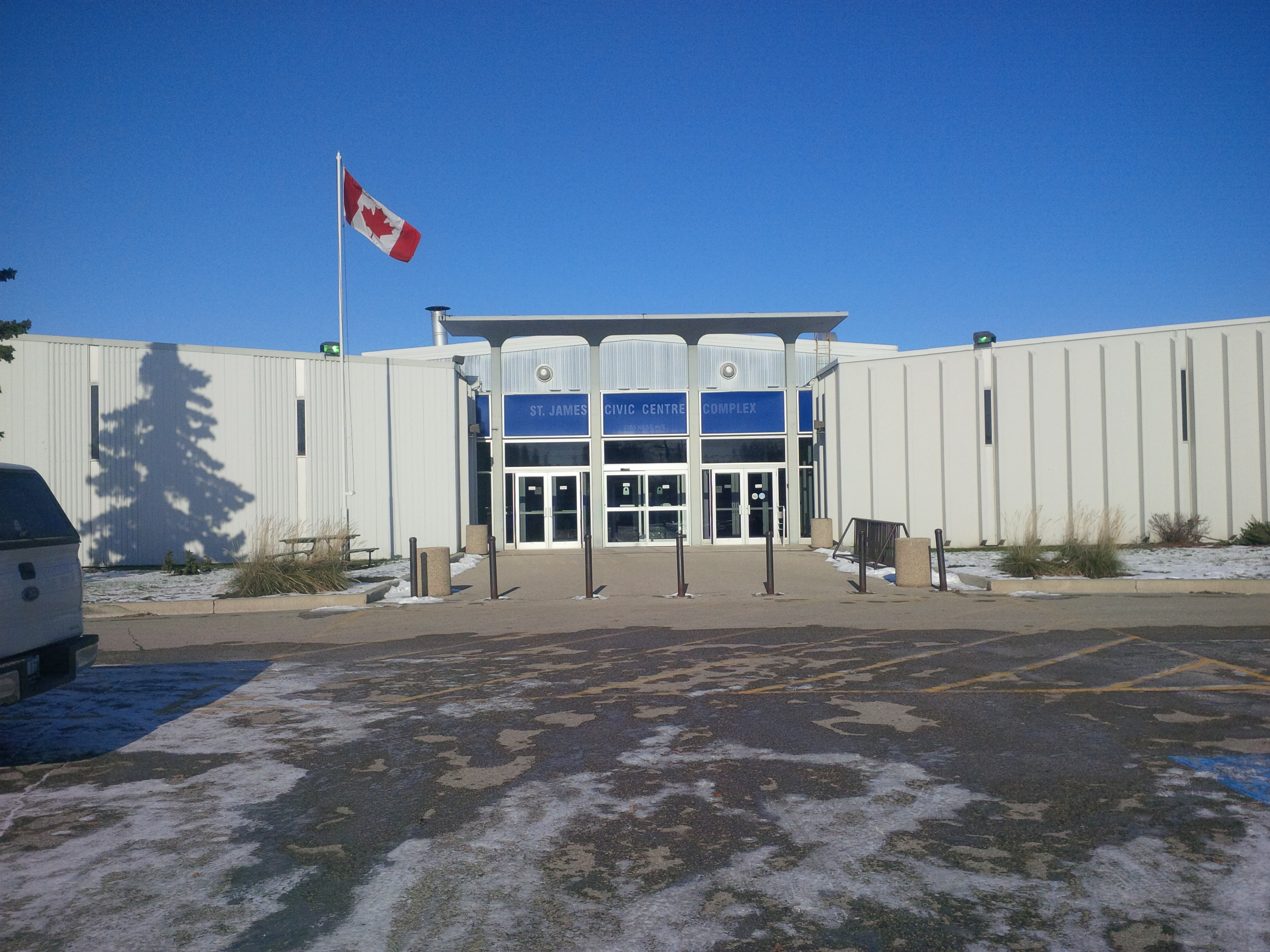
- St. James Civic Centre

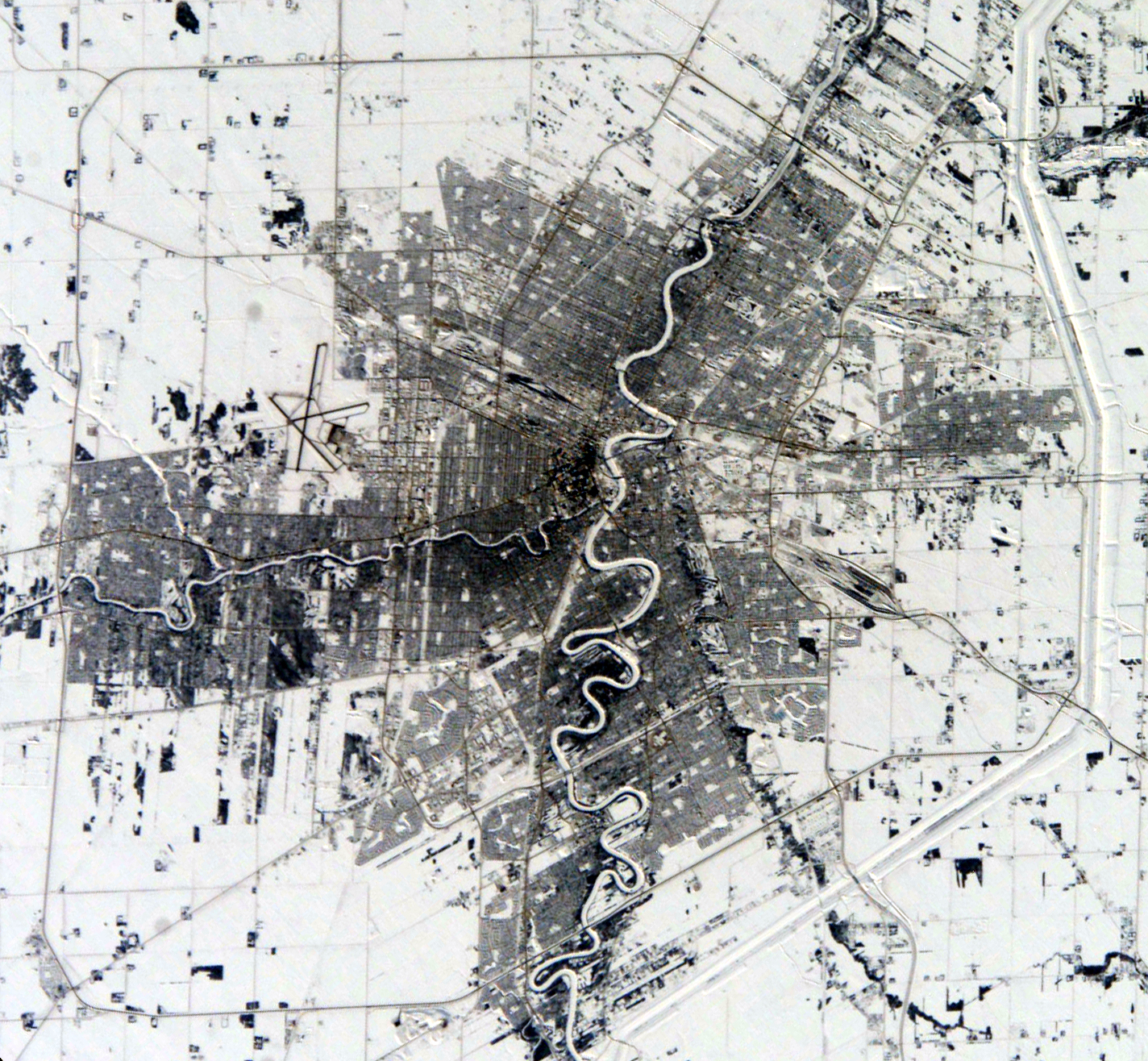
- Location in Winnipeg Location in Manitoba Location in Canada
- Location: Winnipeg, Manitoba, Canada
- Coordinates: 49°53′10″N 97°14′03″W
- Owner: City of Winnipeg
- Capacity: 1,500 (ice hockey)

Construction
- Opened: 1967

Tenants
- St. James Canadians (MJHL) 1967-2004; St. James Canucks (MMJHL) 1978-present Winnipeg Saints (MJHL) 2011-2012

The St. James Civic Centre is a multipurpose recreation complex located in the St. James district of Winnipeg, Manitoba, Canada. The complex features an indoor ice hockey arena, swimming pool, and auditorium. Built in 1967, the St. James Civic Centre is owned and operated by the City of Winnipeg.

The St. James Civic Centre arena has been one of the more prominent hockey venues in Winnipeg since its opening. With a seating capacity of 1,500, it is one of the larger arenas in the city.

The facility is currently home to the St. James Canucks of the Manitoba Major Junior Hockey League and local minor hockey teams.

The arena is also used for sledge hockey and ringette during the winter, as well as non-sporting activities during the summer. The pool and leisure centre includes a 25-yard*** swimming pool and weight room. In addition, there is a 350-seat auditorium and two meeting rooms. The facilities are available to the public year-round.

== History ==
An architectural drawing published in October 1964 of the new St. James Civic Centre, to be located on a portion of land formerly used by the Assiniboine Golf Course.

The St. James Civic Centre arena opened on January 22, 1966. The whole complex cost $850,000 to build with the first hockey event between St. James and Deer Lodge.

The St. James Canadians of the Manitoba Junior Hockey League were the arena's primary tenant from its opening in 1967 until the club's demise in 2004. Another MJHL team, the Winnipeg Saints, played one season there in 2011–2012.

It was also the venue for the CBC Championship Curling and the CBC Curling Classic series which aired from 1966 to 1979. The arena was also used a filming location for the 2011 hockey film Goon.
