= Providence University College and Theological Seminary =

Canadian Christian college

Coordinates: 49°30′06″N 97°02′41″W

- Motto: Knowledge and Character for Leadership and Service
- Type: Christian
- Established: 1925
- Affiliations: Association of Theological Schools in the United States and Canada, CCCU
- Religious affiliation: Evangelical Christian
- President: Kenton C. Anderson
- Undergraduates: 250
- Postgraduates: 75
- Location: Otterburne, Manitoba, Canada
- Campus: 100 acres (40 ha)
Colors
Institutional Blue and Institutional Grey
- Nickname: Pilots
- Sporting affiliations: MCAC, CCAA, NIAC, NCCAA
- Website: www.prov.ca

Providence University College and Theological Seminary is an Evangelical Christian university college and theological seminary located approximately 50 kilometres (31 miles) southeast of Winnipeg in Otterburne, Manitoba, Canada.

== History ==
Providence University College and Theological Seminary, formerly known as The Winnipeg Bible Training School, was founded in Canada in 1925, and renamed a short time later to Winnipeg Bible Institute with one of its founding leaders named Reverend H. L. Turner. When it received a provincial charter to grant theological degrees in 1949, it was renamed Winnipeg Bible Institute and College of Theology, and started a full degree-granting program before being renamed Winnipeg Bible College in 1963.

In 1970, the college moved 50 kilometres (31 mi) south to Otterburne, Manitoba, where it acquired the vacant building of the former St. Joseph's College, a Roman Catholic high school. A graduate division was formed as Providence Theological Seminary in 1972, which had full membership in the Association of Theological Schools (ATS). In 1992, the school was renamed Providence College and Theological Seminary. The name was further changed in 2011 to Providence University College and Theological Seminary. The school had an enrolment of 525 in the University College and Seminary in 2019.

== Academics ==
=== Providence University College ===
Providence University College offers bachelor degrees in the Arts, Science, Business Administration and Theology. Some of its most popular majors include Aviation, Communications & Media, Biblical Studies, Biology, Business, Health Science, Psychology and TESOL (Teaching English to Speakers of Other Languages).

Providence University College is home to two distinct schools which include: an English Language Institute which prepares international students, whose first language is not English, for successful academic studies at the post-secondary level, and the Buller School of Business that offers two-year, three-year and four-year programs.

While most courses are taught on the main Otterburne campus in rural Southeastern Manitoba, the university branched out in 2022 to offer a two-year Associate of Arts in Business in downtown Winnipeg and continues to develop a significant presence in the city.

Providence is accredited by The Association for Biblical Higher Education (ABHE), and offers more than 200 courses that are transferable to University of Manitoba, as well as other Canadian educational institutions such as Brandon University and the University of Winnipeg.

=== Providence Theological Seminary ===
The seminary offers one-year graduate certificates, diplomas, bachelors, masters and doctoral degrees in areas such as leadership, chaplaincy, christian studies, educational studies and counselling. Its most popular program is a Master of Arts in Counselling as well as a Master of Divinity and Doctor of Ministry. The various programs offer options for students who are continuing their education, seeking ordination, advancing their training, general knowledge and skill sets.

There are a number of flexible learning offerings in the Seminary, as it offers Distance Education which includes courses delivered through in-person classes, modular classes, hybrid format, directed study, and online learning.

The seminary has been publishing the journal Didaskalia since 1989. The journal is abstracted and indexed in Religious and Theological Abstracts, ATLA Religion Database, and ATLASerials Online.

=== Centre for On-Demand Education ===
In 2023, Providence launched its Centre for On-Demand Education (CODE). This is a new offering that seeks to address the needs of: individual students who want to continue their education and upgrade their skills; as well as employers who want to develop their employees with on-the-job training.

=== William Falk Library and Learning Resource Centre ===
The Providence Library and Learning Resource Centre provides room for more than 100,000 volumes and the latest in technology. The number of private study carrels and other private work stations has increased to 200. The facility is around 20,000 square feet and open to both students and the public. Visit prov.ca for library hours.

== Athletics ==
Providence is the home of the Pilots, who compete in both the National Christian College Athletic Association (NCCAA), as well as the Manitoba Colleges Athletics Conference (MCAC). Providence has teams for Men's and Women's basketball, volleyball, soccer, and futsal. Providence University College is equipped with a fully functional gymnasium, soccer fields, an outdoor ice rink and two beach volleyball courts. They play all their home games at the Niverville's Community Resource and Recreation Centre (CRRC).

== Notable alumni ==
- K.R. Byggdin, writer
- Paul P. Enns, theologian
- Henry Hildebrand, academic
- Erwin Lutzer, theologian
- Jordan Peters, curler
- Joey Royal, Anglican bishop
- Gwen Smid, writer
- Matt Fast and John Paul Peters of The Undecided, musicians
- Andrew Unger, writer

== See also ==
- List of evangelical seminaries and theological colleges
- List of universities in the Canadian Prairies
- Higher education in Manitoba
