= Manitoba Major Junior Hockey League =

Canadian ice hockey league

- Sport: Ice hockey
- Founded: 1970
- First season: 1970-71
- President: Kerry Lines
- No. of teams: 10
- Most recent champion: Transcona Railer Express (2026)
- Most titles: Charleswood Hawks (16)
- Website: MMJHL.ca

The Manitoba Major Junior Hockey League (MMJHL) is a junior ice hockey league in Manitoba, Canada. Founded in 1970, the league was operated as an independent league. MMJHL affiliated with Hockey Manitoba and Hockey Canada in the mid-1990s. Teams compete annually for the Art Moug Trophy (regular season winner) and Jack McKenzie Trophy (playoff champion).

== History ==
Founded in 1970, the Manitoba Major Junior Hockey League was created due to a lack of playing opportunities for Winnipeg-area players. After the restructuring of junior hockey in the country, Hockey Canada relegated the Manitoba Junior Hockey League (MJHL) from Major Junior (previously known as Tier I) to Junior 'A' (Tier II), meaning there was no active "second-tier" league in the Winnipeg area.

The new league applied to the Manitoba Amateur Hockey Association (now Hockey Manitoba) for membership and was initially accepted. When the MAHA was informed the league wanted to call itself the "Manitoba Junior 'B' Hockey League", MAHA objected on the grounds that the MJHL was in the process of constructing a developmental league for itself with that name. After negotiations between the MJHL and the new league did not work out, the league informed the MAHA that it would operate independently.

In 1977, the Canadian Amateur Hockey Association offered the league a Junior B status, instead of its requested Junior A status. Affiliation with Hockey Manitoba did happen during the mid-1990s as insurance premiums became too much for league members.

The league's first season started with the original four teams: Charleswood Hawks, Fort Garry Blues, River Heights Cardinals and Stonewall Rockets. Only a week into the season, the league was contacted by teams in Portage la Prairie and St. James who were looking for a league to play in after the MJHL's attempt to create a Junior 'B' league failed. Soon after, Neepawa approached the league also, but due to travel did not join. Instead, Neepawa participated in at least two interleague games against each team. In the second season, a team from Kenora, Ontario did this as well.

At the end of the first season, the MMJHL was allowed to send a "champion" (St. James) to compete against the MAHA Junior 'B' champion.

The Manitoba Major Junior Hockey League name comes from the league's adaptation of the Western Hockey League's player eligibility rules (permitted to roster four "over-age" 21-year-old players).

== Teams ==
Team	Centre	Founded	McKenzie Trophy titles	Moug Trophy titles
Charleswood Hawks	Eric Coy Arena	1970	16	14
Fort Garry/Fort Rouge Twins	Century Arena	1970	7	5
Pembina Valley Twisters	Morris Multiplex	2001	3	3
Raiders Junior Hockey Club	Seven Oaks Sportsplex	1977	3	4
River East Royal Knights	Terry Sawchuk Memorial Arena	1981	7	8
St. Boniface Riels	Southdale Community Centre	1971	6	7
St. James Canucks	St.James Civic Centre Arena	1978	4	3
St. Vital Victorias	St. Vital Centennial Arena	1975	1	3
Stonewall Jets	Veterans Memorial Sports Complex	2001	1	0
Transcona Railer Express	Ed Golding Memorial Arena	2012	1	1

=== Former teams ===
- East Kildonan Knights (1972–1981)
- Kern-Hill Nationals (1973–1975)
- Midland Flyers (1975–1985)
- Portage la Prairie (1970–1972)
- River Heights Cardinals (1970–1978)
- Selkirk (1972–1973)
- Stonewall (1970–1971)
- Transcona Railers (1983-2011)
- Transcona Titans (1972–1976)
- West Kildonan Nev Knights (1972–1975)

== Champions ==
Season	Jack McKenzie Trophy (playoff champion)	Art Moug Trophy (regular season winner)	Regular season record
1970-71	River Heights Cardinals	River Heights Cardinals	23-3-6
1971-72	St. Boniface Riels	St. Boniface Riels	22-6-2
1972-73	St. Boniface Riels	St. Boniface Riels	24-7-4
1973-74	Charleswood Hawks	Charleswood Hawks	25-8-2
1974-75	Fort Garry/Fort Rouge Blues	West Kildonan Nev Knights	19-11-7
1975-76	Fort Garry/Fort Rouge Blues	St. Boniface Riels	22-7-7
1976-77	Fort Garry/Fort Rouge Blues	Fort Garry/Fort Rouge Blues	30-7-5
1977-78	Fort Garry/Fort Rouge Blues	Fort Garry/Fort Rouge Blues	28-7-7
1978-79	Charleswood Hawks	Seven Oaks Raiders	31-10-1
1979-80	Seven Oaks Raiders	Seven Oaks Raiders	36-6-0
1980-81	Charleswood Hawks	Charleswood Hawks	31-11-0
1981-82	River East Royal Knights	St. Boniface Riels	28-13-0
1982-83	Fort Garry/Fort Rouge Bisons	St. James Canucks	25-6-1
1983-84	Transcona Railers	Transcona Railers	27-12-1
1984-85	St. Boniface Riels	St. Boniface Riels	32-7-1
1985-86	St. Boniface Riels	St. Boniface Riels	29-10-3
1986-87	River East Royal Knights	River East Royal Knights	28-13-0
1987-88	River East Royal Knights	River East Royal Knights	34-6-2
1988-89	River East Royal Knights	River East Royal Knights	37-3-2
1989-90	River East Royal Knights	River East Royal Knights	35-6-1
1990-91	Transcona Railers	St. Vital Victorias	27-14-1
1991-92	Transcona Railers	Transcona Railers	33-8-1
1992-93	River East Royal Knights	River East Royal Knights	33-9-0
1993-94	Charleswood Hawks	River East Royal Knights	33-8-1
1994-95	Charleswood Hawks	River East Royal Knights	33-9-0
1995-96	Charleswood Hawks	Charleswood Hawks	39-2-1
1996-97	Charleswood Hawks	Charleswood Hawks	33-8-1
1997-98	St. James Canucks	Charleswood Hawks	30-10-2
1998-99	Fort Garry/Rouge Twins	Fort Garry/Rouge Twins	36-5-1
1999-00	Fort Garry/Rouge Twins	Fort Garry/Rouge Twins	31-9-2
2000-01	River East Royal Knights	Fort Garry/Rouge Twins	28-9-2-3
2001-02	Charleswood Hawks	Charleswood Hawks	35-7-1-2
2002-03	Charleswood Hawks	Charleswood Hawks	37-6-1-1
2003-04	St. Vital Victorias	St. Vital Victorias	41-1-2-1
2004-05	Charleswood Hawks	Charleswood Hawks	42-2-0-1
2005-06	Charleswood Hawks	St. Vital Victorias	34-8-1-2
2006-07	Charleswood Hawks	Charleswood Hawks	41-2-1-1
2007-08	Pembina Valley Twisters	Charleswood Hawks	34-6-2-3
2008-09	Charleswood Hawks	Charleswood Hawks	35-8-2
2009-10	Charleswood Hawks	Pembina Valley Twisters	35-7-3
2010-11	Charleswood Hawks	Charleswood Hawks	40-3-2
2011-12	Charleswood Hawks	Charleswood Hawks	33-4-3
2012-13	Pembina Valley Twisters	Charleswood Hawks	37-4-4
2013-14	Raiders Jr. Hockey Club	St. Boniface Riels	37-6-2
2014-15	St. Boniface Riels	Raiders Jr. Hockey Club	31-8-5
2015-16	Stonewall Jets	Raiders Jr. Hockey Club	32-9-4
2016-17	Raiders Jr. Hockey Club	Charleswood Hawks	30-10-5
2017-18	Raiders Jr. Hockey Club	Raiders Jr. Hockey Club	37-3-5
2018-19	Pembina Valley Twisters	Pembina Valley Twisters	35-6-4
2019-20	Playoffs cancelled due to COVID-19	Pembina Valley Twisters	35-7-3
2020-21	none	Season cancelled due to COVID-19 pandemic	- -
2021-22	St.James Canucks	St. James Canucks	37-4-4
2022-23	St.James Canucks	St. James Canucks	40-4-1
2023-24	St.James Canucks	St. James Canucks	37-7-1
2024-25	St. Boniface Riels	Fort Garry/Fort Rouge Twins	36-7-0-2
2025-26	Transcona Railer Express	Transcona Railer Express	36-7-1-0

== League records ==
Category	Team/Player	Stats	Season
Best regular season record	St. Vital Victorias	41-1-2-1	2003-04
Most goals scored (team) in a season	River East Royal Knights	346 (42 games)	1989-90
Fewest goals against (team) in a season	Charleswood Hawks	84 (40 games)	2011-12
Most points (individual) in a season	Tim Lorentz, Transcona Railers	51 goals, 103 assists	1991-92
Most goals (individual) in a season	Scott Parker, River East Royal Knights	72 goals	1989-90
Best goalie GAA in a season**	Ryan Hall, Charleswood Hawks	1.58 GAA	2017-18
Best goalie save% in a season**	Ryan Hall, Charleswood Hawks	.948 save%	2017-18

** = minimum of 12 games played
