= River East Royal Knights =

- City: Winnipeg, Manitoba
- League: Manitoba Major Junior Hockey League
- Founded: 1972
- Home arena: Terry Sawchuk Memorial Arena
- Colours: Away: Black, Purple, White Home: White, Gold, Purple
- Owner: Barry Bonni
- General manager: Barry Bonni
- Head coach: Manny Minuk

The River East Royal Knights are a junior ice hockey team in the Manitoba Major Junior Hockey League. Based in Winnipeg, Manitoba, Canada, the Royal Knights play their home games at Terry Sawchuk Memorial Arena.

== History ==
Formed in 1972 as the East Kildonan Knights, president and part owner John Haasbeek (who led a group that bought the team in 1977) folded the team in April 1981 after operating it for four seasons. Haasbeek was then approached by Barry Bonni (2017 Manitoba Hockey Hall of Fame inductee) about keeping a team in the area. The two worked together and formed the new River East Royal Knights for the 1981-82 MMJHL season.

After three straight seasons by the E.K. Knights of finishing third in the league standings the Royal Knights captured the Jack McKenzie Trophy in their very first season. The team won four consecutive league titles from 1987 to 1990 and again in 1993 and 2001.

The Royal Knights have been to the league finals twelve times while claiming the Art Moug Trophy (regular season winner) seven times in team history.

== Season-by-season ==
Season	W	L	T	OTL	Pts	Finish	Playoffs
1972-73	17	16	2	---	36	4th of 8	
1973-74	11	17	7	---	29	7th of 8	
1974-75	17	15	5	---	39	5th of 8	
1975-76	13	19	4	---	30	6th of 8	
1976-77	18	17	7	---	43	4th of 7	
1977-78	27	13	2	---	57	3rd of 8	
1978-79	25	10	7	---	57	3rd of 8	
1979-80	22	19	1	---	45	3rd of 8	
1980-81	27	15	0	---	54	3rd of 8	
1981-82	22	20	0	---	44	4th of 8	League champion
1982-83	25	16	1	---	51	2nd of 8	
1983-84	18	20	2	---	38	6th of 9	
1984-85	20	20	0	---	40	5th of 9	
1985-86	19	19	4	---	42	5th of 8	
1986-87	28	13	0	---	56	1st of 8	League champion
1987-88	34	6	2	---	70	1st of 8	League champion
1988-89	37	3	2	---	76	1st of 8	League champion
1989-90	35	6	1	---	71	1st of 8	League champion
1990-91	24	17	1	---	49	6th of 8	
1991-92	28	14	0	---	56	3rd of 8	
1992-93	33	9	0	---	66	1st of 8	League champion
1993-94	33	8	1	---	67	1st of 8	
1994-95	33	9	0	---	66	1st of 8	
1995-96	28	13	1	---	57	3rd of 8	
1996-97	13	28	1	---	27	8th of 8	
1997-98	25	15	2	---	52	2nd of 8	
1998-99	22	19	1	---	45	4th of 8	
1999-00	19	21	2	---	40	6th of 8	
2000-01	19	16	3	4	45	3rd of 8	League champion
2001-02	31	12	0	2	64	2nd of 10	
2002-03	36	7	1	1	76	2nd of 10	
2003-04	24	18	2	1	51	3rd of 10	
2004-05	25	17	1	2	53	4th of 10	
2005-06	27	16	1	1	56	3rd of 10	
2006-07	24	17	2	2	52	4th of 10	
2007-08	25	15	1	4	55	5th of 10	
2008-09	21	17	---	7	49	7th of 10	
2009-10	20	22	---	3	43	6th of 10	
2010-11	11	31	---	3	25	9th of 10	
2011-12	9	25	---	6	24	8th of 9	
2012-13	22	19	---	4	48	5th of 10	
2013-14	21	18	---	6	48	5th of 10	
2014-15	23	19	---	3	49	6th of 10	
2015-16	18	22	---	5	41	9th of 10	DNQ
2016-17	6	39	---	0	12	10th of 10	DNQ
2017-18	2	41	---	2	6	10th of 10	DNQ
2018-19	3	40	---	2	8	10th of 10	DNQ
2019-20	4	36	---	5	13	10th of 10	DNQ
2020-21	0	4	-	0	0	Covid	
2021-22	20	25	-	0	40	7th of 10	Lost Quarters 1-4 (Transcona)
2022-23	28	14	-	3	59	2nd of 10	Lost Quarters 1-4 (Transcona)
2023-24	8	31	5	1	22	10th of 10	Did Not Qualify
2024-25	8	32	2	0	18	9th of 10	Did Not Qualify
2025-26	25	19	1	0	51	6th of 10	Won Quarterfinals 4-3 (Stonewall); Lost Semi-Finals 0-4 (Transcona)
