= Pembina Valley Twisters =

- City: Morris, Manitoba (Canada)
- League: Manitoba Major Junior Hockey League
- Founded: 2001
- Home arena: Morris Multiplex
- Colours: Maroon, Black, and White
- Owner(s): Pat Schmitke
- Website: pembinavalleytwisters.ca

Championships
- Jack McKenzie Trophy: 3 (2007-08, 2012-13, 2018-19)
- Art Moug Trophy: 2 (2009-10, 2018-19)

The Pembina Valley Twisters are a junior ice hockey team based in Morris, Manitoba, Canada. A member of the Manitoba Major Junior Hockey League (MMJHL), the Twisters play their home games at Morris Multiplex.

== History ==
The Pembina Valley Twisters first skated into existence in September 2001, founded by Glenn Cordy and Kerry Lines. Glenn and Kerry coached the Sanford Sabers High School Hockey Team during the 2000–01 season. At the conclusion of an emotional season it was realized that the graduating players did not have a place to continue playing outside the "Winkler Flyers" and a Junior B team in St. Malo, Manitoba. Thus the founding of the team in 2001.

The first four years were played in Oak Bluff. The first coach was Danny McDonald.

The third and fourth years were led by Rick Smith and his coaching staff. During both seasons, the Twisters competed and made the playoffs. Concluding the fourth season, as was the case with Danny McDonald, Rick Smith stepped down as head coach.

After their fourth season, Glen Munford contacted Kerry Lines inquiring about an expansion franchise for Morris. That was not possible, as sharing the existing geographic area would not work. The other possibility was proposed, moving the Twisters to the Town of Morris. After several discussions and after partaking in the Stampede Parade, it was unanimously decided to move the franchise to Morris. The existing ownership group of Kerry, Don Boyd and Doug Ushakas joined Glen Munford and Dale Rempel to make up the new ownership group.

The Twisters entered their fifth year with Doug Ushakas behind the bench as head coach, after two previous seasons as an assistant to Rick Smith. After an off-season recruiting program, the Twisters were eliminated during the first round of playoffs.

== League championships ==
=== Jack McKenzie Trophy (playoffs) ===
- 2007-08, 2012-13, 2018-19

=== Art Moug Trophy (regular season) ===
- 2009-10
- 2018-19
- 2019-20

== Head coaches ==
- Danny McDonald (2001–2003)
- Rick Smith (2003–2005)
- Doug Ushakas (2005–2007)
- Garth Shindle (2009–2012)
- Derek Mohr (2012–2016)
- Ryan Dyck (2016–2020)
- Matt Dyck (2020-2022)
- Braeden Beernaerts (2022-2025)
- Chris Unger (2025 - present)
