= Otterburne =

Coordinates: 49°29′50″N 97°03′06″W

Location of Otterburne in Manitoba

Otterburne is a small settlement in the Rural Municipality of De Salaberry, Manitoba, located about 50 kilometers south of Winnipeg, in Canada. It is named after Otterburn, Northumberland in England, and is the location of Providence University College and Theological Seminary.

On 30 July 2005, a windstorm reaching speeds of over 150 km/h ripped through the Otterburne area, destroying trees, damaging buildings, and picking up irrigation wheels which weighed over 15 tonnes. Eyewitnesses reported seeing a tornado.
