= Fort Garry/Fort Rouge Twins =

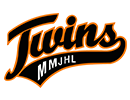
- City: Winnipeg, Manitoba
- League: Manitoba Major Junior Hockey League
- Founded: 1970
- Home arena: Century Arena
- Colours: Orange and black
- Owner(s): Twins LP
- General manager: Scott Wong
- Head coach: Scott Wong

Franchise history
- Fort Gary/Fort Rouge Blues 1970–1978; Fort Garry/Fort Rouge Legion 90's 1978–1981; Fort Garry/Fort Rouge Bisons 1981–1983; Fort Gary/Fort Rouge 90's 1984–1986; Fort Garry/Fort Rouge Twins 1986–present

Championships
- Jack McKenzie Trophy: 7 (1974-75, 1975-76, 1976-77, 1977-78, 1982-83, 1998-99, 1999-00)
- Art Moug Trophy: 6 (1976-77, 1977-78, 1998-99, 1999-00, 2000-01, 2024-25)

The Fort Garry/Fort Rouge Twins are a Canadian junior ice hockey team currently based in Winnipeg, Manitoba, Canada. Established in 1970 as the Fort Garry/Fort Rouge Blues, the club is a charter member of the Manitoba Major Junior Hockey League (MMJHL).

Since 2010, Century Arena has been the home of the Twins, who have won seven league championships. Fort Garry/Fort Rouge has also won the Art Moug Trophy (regular season title) six times.

== History ==
| Team Name | Seasons | Home arena |
|---|---|---|
| Fort Garry/Fort Rouge Blues | 1970-78 | |
| Fort Garry/Fort Rouge Legion 90's | 1978-81 | Century Arena |
| Fort Garry/Fort Rouge Bisons | 1981-83 | Max Bell Centre |
| Fort Garry/Fort Rouge Twins | 1986- 2009 | Sam Southern Arena |
| | 2010 - present | Century Arena |

== League championships ==
=== Jack Mackenzie Trophy (playoffs) ===
- 1974-75, 1975-76, 1976-77, 1977-78, 1982-83, 1998-99, 1999-00

=== Art Moug Trophy (regular season) ===
- 1976-77, 1977-78, 1998-99, 1999-00, 2000-01, 2024-25
