= Charleswood Hawks =

- City: Winnipeg, Manitoba
- League: Manitoba Major Junior Hockey League
- Founded: 1970
- Operated: Non-Profit Community Organization
- Home arena: Eric Coy Arena
- Colours: White, black and red
- President: Tim Scharer
- General manager: Tim Scharer
- Head coach: Will Kinsman

Championships
- Jack McKenzie Trophy: 16 (1973-74, 1978-79, 1980-81, 1993-94, 1994-95, 1995-96, 1996-97, 2001-02, 2002-03, 2004-05, 2005-06, 2006-07, 2008-09, 2009-10, 2010-11, 2011-12)
- Art Moug Trophy: 15 (1973-74, 1980-81, 1995-96, 1996-97, 1997-98, 2001-02, 2002-03, 2004-05, 2006-07, 2007-08, 2008-09, 2010-11, 2011-12, 2012-13, 2016-17)

The Charleswood Hawks are a Canadian junior ice hockey team currently based in Winnipeg, Manitoba, Canada. Established in 1970, the Hawks a charter member of the Manitoba Major Junior Hockey League (MMJHL)

Eric Coy Arena is the home of the Hawks, who are the most successful team in the history of MMJHL. The Charleswood Hawks have won the Art Moug Trophy 15 times and the Jack Mckenzie Trophy 16 times.

== League championships ==
=== Jack Mackenzie Trophy (playoffs) ===
- 1973–74, 1978–79, 1980–81, 1993–94, 1994–95, 1995–96, 1996–97, 2001–02, 2002–03, 2004–05, 2005–06, 2006–07, 2008–09, 2009–10, 2010–11, 2011–12,

=== Art Moug Trophy (regular season) ===
- 1973–74, 1980–81, 1995–96, 1996–97, 1997–98, 2001–02, 2002–03, 2004–05, 2006–07, 2007–08, 2008–09, 2010–11, 2011–12, 2012–13, 2016–17
