= Higher education in Alberta =

Post-secondary education in Alberta, Canada

Province of Alberta

Higher education in Alberta refers to the post secondary education system for the province of Alberta. The Ministry of Advanced Education in Alberta oversees educational delivery through universities, publicly funded colleges, technical institutions, and private colleges. These institutions offer a variety of academic and vocational pursuits. Students have access to post-secondary options through most regions of Alberta, and a developed articulation system allows for increased student mobility.

== History ==
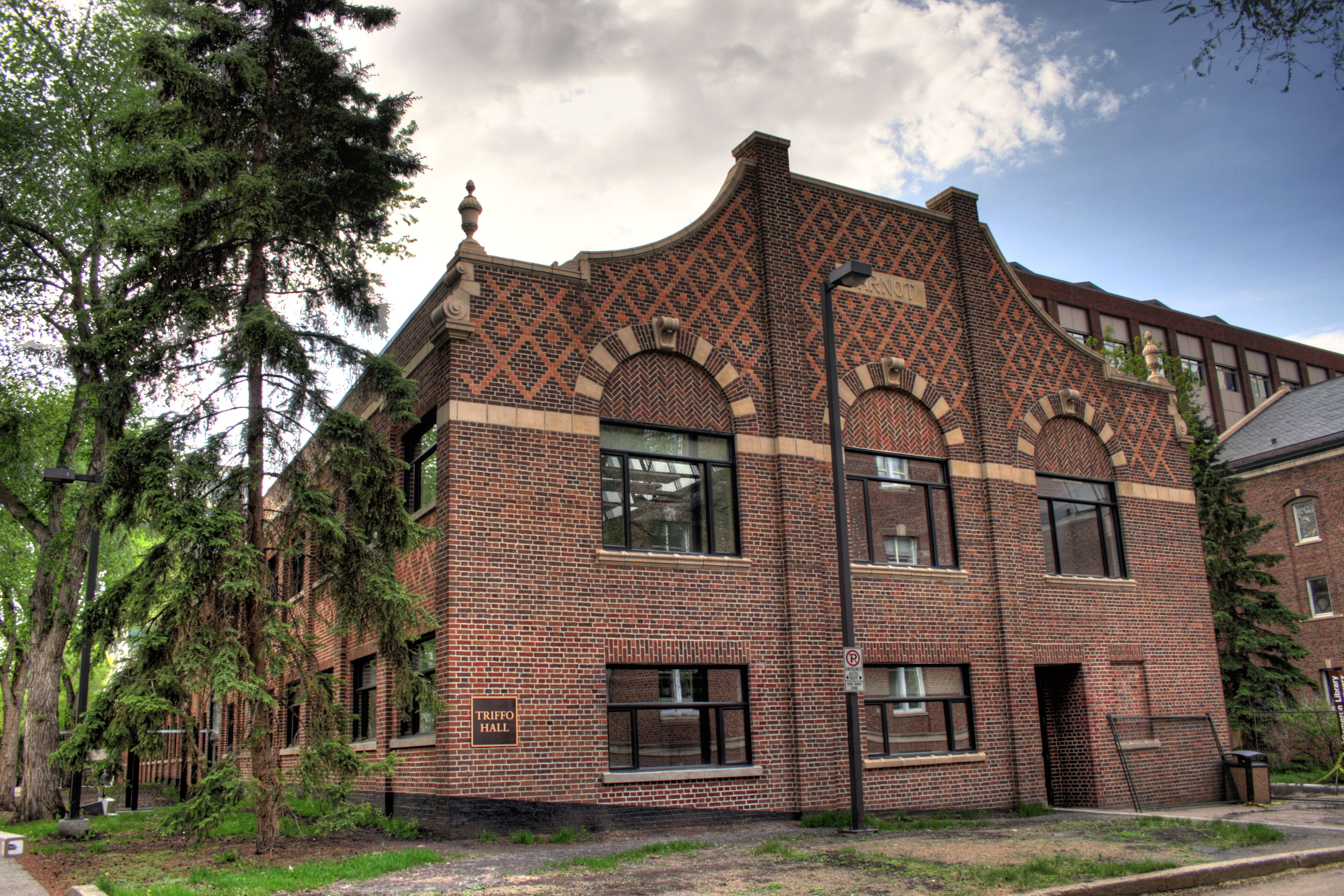
Triffo Hall, on the campus of the University of Alberta, Edmonton

=== Establishment of universities in Alberta (1908–1950s) ===
In 1905, the province of Alberta was created out of the North West Territories and the following year, the Alberta legislature passed an act to establish a provincial university. Founded in 1908, the University of Alberta became the first degree granting institution in the province. The university followed the model of the land-grant state colleges in the Midwest of the United States and is a non-denominational, publicly supported institution that provides programs accessible to the provincial population.

A number of Calgary business owners and the municipal government attempted to establish the private "University of Calgary" in Calgary and by October 1912, began classes. In 1911, 1913 and 1915 it applied for degree-granting powers, but was turned down. It was renamed Calgary College, and closed in 1915 due to low enrolment, lack of financial support, continuing squabbles with the province and the beginning of the World War I.

In 1916 The Provincial Institute of Technology and Art (PITA) is established in Calgary to train returning veterans of World War I.

Mount Royal College in Calgary becomes a junior college affiliated with the University of Alberta in 1931 and begins offering one-year university transfer programs. But the affiliation entailed a certain degree of control over college affairs by the University of Alberta.

In 1933, the Banff School of Fine Arts was established with the aid of a grant from the Carnegie Corporation of New York.

After the World War II, higher education in Alberta expanded resulting from the province's fast transformation into an urban industrial society and increased demand for skilled manpower. In response to the growing demand for university education, the provincial government allowed the university of Alberta to establish a branch of its Faculty of Education in Calgary in 1945. In 1957, Lethbridge Junior College was established.

=== Post-secondary expansion (1960s) ===
The 1960s was also a period of important institutional development for the post-secondary sector, as various legislations were enacted in order to consolidate and solidify new institutions. Several institutions were created in smaller urban centres, establishing a network of colleges and technical institutes. Some of these were Red Deer College in 1964, Medicine Hat College in 1966, Grande Prairie Junior College in 1966, and Mount Royal College in 1966. The University of Calgary and the University of Lethbridge, which had been branch campuses of the University of Alberta, were developed into autonomous institutions in 1966 and 1967 respectively.

Federal government support for technical education continued after World War II via the Technical and Vocational Training Assistance Act (TVTAA) of 1960, which was designed to help construct new vocational high schools, institutes of technology and adult-training centres. The province began expanding the capacity for apprenticeship and vocational training that, until then, had been handled solely by the Provincial Institute of Technology and Arts (PITA) in Calgary. The Northern Alberta Institute of Technology (NAIT) was created in Edmonton, and PITA was transformed into the Southern Alberta Institute of Technology, both in 1962.

New agencies were also formed such as the Board of Post-Secondary Education and the Alberta Department of Advanced Education in 1967, which were to oversee post-secondary institutions other than universities. Another milestone occurred in 1966, when the province of Alberta began systematically providing operating grants to post-secondary institutions. In 1969, the Colleges Act was passed, making colleges partners in higher education in the province. The act aims at solidifying the newly created colleges of the province.

In 1969, the Minister of Education, Robert Curtis Clark, established a Commission on Educational Planning headed by Dr. Walter Worth. The Worth Report (1972) set the course for PSE in the province to this day. Among the recommendations made in the Worth Report, one major theme is that the provincial government should change structures in such a manner as to have more direct influence on the post-secondary system.

=== Distance education in Alberta (1970s) ===
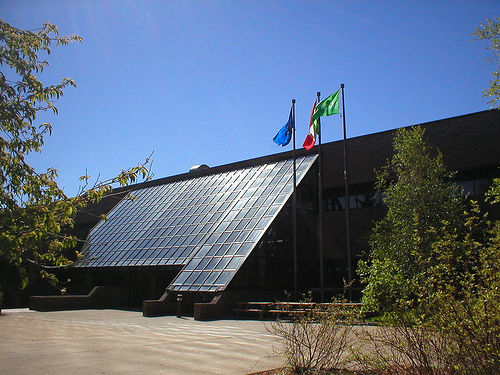
Athabasca University in Athabasca, Alberta.

The 1970s witnessed new institutional developments, the most important being the creation of the fourth Alberta university, Athabasca University, in 1970 by an order in council of the Government of Alberta. It was to be a campus-based university, but given decreasing enrolments in university campuses afterwards, the institution followed the model of the British open university specializing in the delivery of distance education courses and programs. In 1970, the Alberta government also established the Banff Centre for Continuing Education under the trustee of the University of Calgary.

The Ministry of Advanced Education was established in 1972. The Alberta Council on Admissions and Transfer (ACAT) was established in 1974 to guide the transfer of academic credit among provincial post-secondary institutions. In 1975, the Conservative government acknowledged the linkage between education and employment by transferring the Manpower Division from Manpower and Labour to the Department of Advanced Education and Manpower. This arrangement existed until 1983, when the manpower portfolio was again separated from Advanced Education.

A series of new funding policies were introduced in 1973 and 1976. These new funding mechanisms took into account factors such as the projection of operational costs over a three-year period and the rate of inflation to determine the allocation of resources for a growing number of institutions.

=== Increasing institutional competition and financial restructuring (1980s–1990s) ===
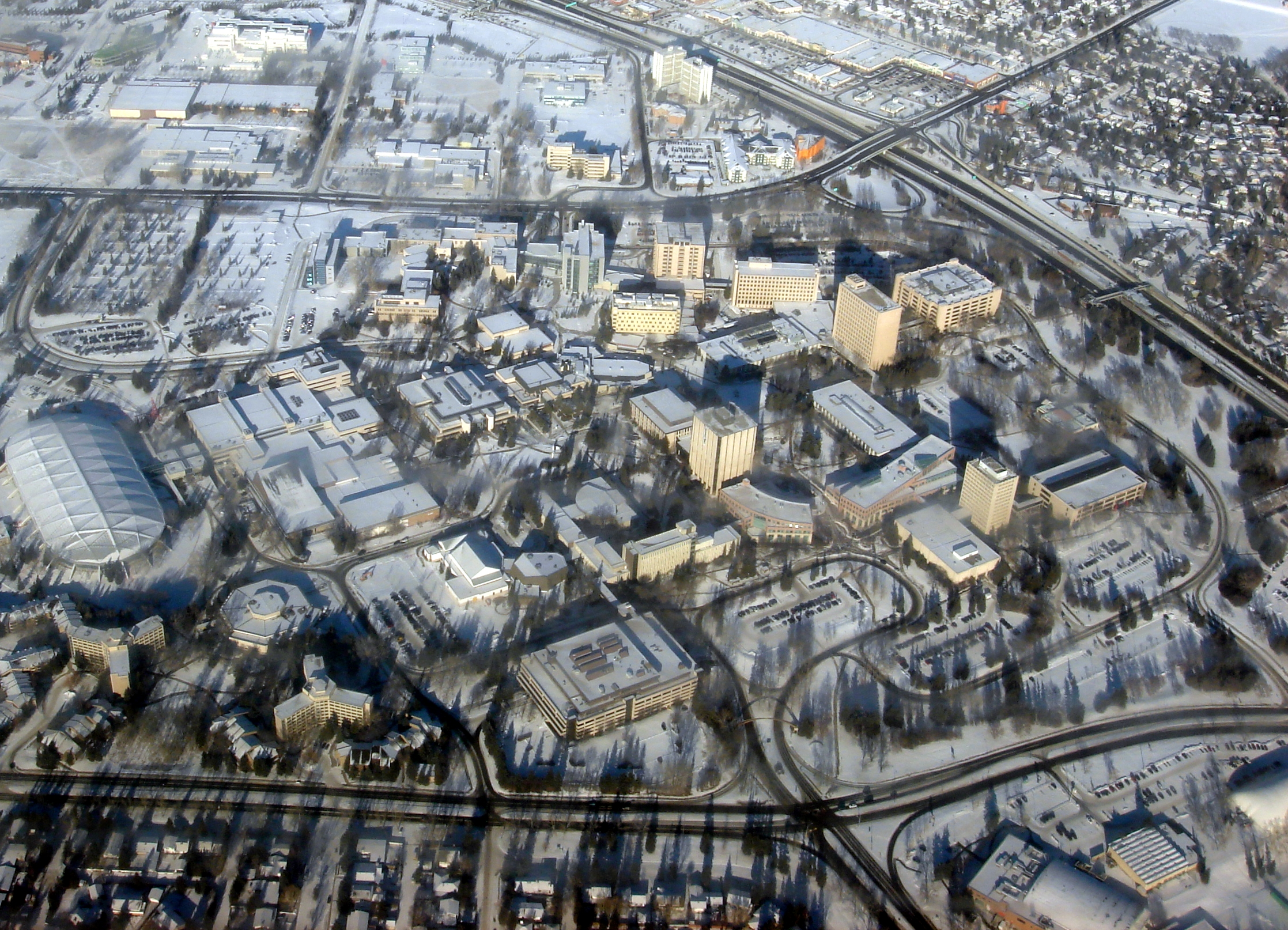
Aerial photo of the University of Calgary

In the 1980s, community colleges began to receive funds in order to establish their own apprenticeship training programs. Prior to this, these programs were centralized in technical institutes. As technical institutes lost their exclusive control over apprenticeship programs, they gained increased autonomy when Bill 98, the Technical Institutes Act, was approved in 1982, transferring their governance from the provincial government to their own board of governors. In the financial front, the 1980s are marked by the introduction of a Supplementary Enrolment Fund for Post-Secondary funding in 1982, which factored in enrolment increases to allocate provincial financial resources.

The 1990s saw Alberta's post-secondary system change in terms of significant financial restructuring imposed by the provincial government, and the introduction of a new and targeted funding model that emphasizes accountability and demonstration of results. These developments were part of the province's deficit reduction strategy in the Alberta government's 1993 announcement to eliminate its provincial debt within four years. The 1990s were characterized by the introduction of funding caps and reduction in overall support for post-secondary programs. One such program was a tuition fee policy introduced by the provincial government in 1990–91, which limited the amount of revenue that public post-secondary institutions could generate from fees to 30% of net operating expenditures by the year 2000. As a result, Alberta went from being the province with the highest per-capita funding for post-secondary education in 1984 to being the ninth, or second to last in 2000.

=== Second post-secondary expansion and government restructuring (2000s–present) ===
In 2000, the provincial government created a K-16 model by combining K-12 and higher education into one department named Alberta Learning.

On March 17, 2004, the Post-Secondary Learning Act was proclaimed, amalgamating the former Universities Act, Colleges Act, Banff Centre Act and Technical Institutes Act into a single piece of legislation.

The booming Alberta economy led to significant investments in post-secondary institutions and policies. A series of new scholarships were introduced for all newborns in the province, and the existing Rutherford scholarships were expended. There were also heavy capital investments, with almost all the main campuses receiving funds for expansions, renovations, and upgrades. A new interest in P3 funding also fuelled this expansion. Many of the new facilities and faculty have made the University of Alberta one of the world's top research institutions, and boast the second-largest student body in Canada as of September, 2009.

In September, 2009, Calgary's Mount Royal University and Edmonton's Grant MacEwan University became the province's fifth and sixth public universities, respectively. Formerly considered colleges, both institutions offer many of the degrees and facilities previously only available at the two larger universities.

Despite recent high provincial spending, tuition costs remain a concern for many Alberta students. Many promised cuts have yet to be realized, and costs are expected to rise again in the 2010s. The recent worldwide economic downturn has also brought a huge number of unemployed people back to school, putting further pressures on the institutions.

== Access ==
=== Geographical ===
Post-Secondary institutions in Alberta have been established in response to geographic population growth. In the beginning, there was only one university in the province, but satellite campuses were established as the population in other parts of the province grew. Later, these satellite campuses became universities that met the educational needs of the province's growing urban centres. In the 1960s, colleges sprouted, enabling access to higher education in rural areas.

=== Transferability ===
Improving access is done not only through geography expansion but also by increasing transferability or articulation of courses and programs between post-secondary institutions. Historically, students completed programs at a single institution. However, over time students have become increasingly mobile, attending more than one post-secondary institution throughout the course of their academic lives. The province has supported and encouraged this kind of student mobility by developing college programs that transfer to larger urban post-secondary institutions where degrees can be completed.

Initially articulation between the post-secondary institutions was conducted on a course by course basis. This approach proved to be laborious and inconsistent. As a result, Alberta post-secondary institutions and the provincial government collaborated to establish the Alberta Council on Admissions and Transfer (ACAT) in 1974.

Through ACAT, post-secondary stakeholders work cooperatively to ensure a smooth transition and transferability of courses and programs within the post-secondary system. ACAT also promotes assessment and recognition of prior learning assessment to recognize experiences outside of formal course requirements.

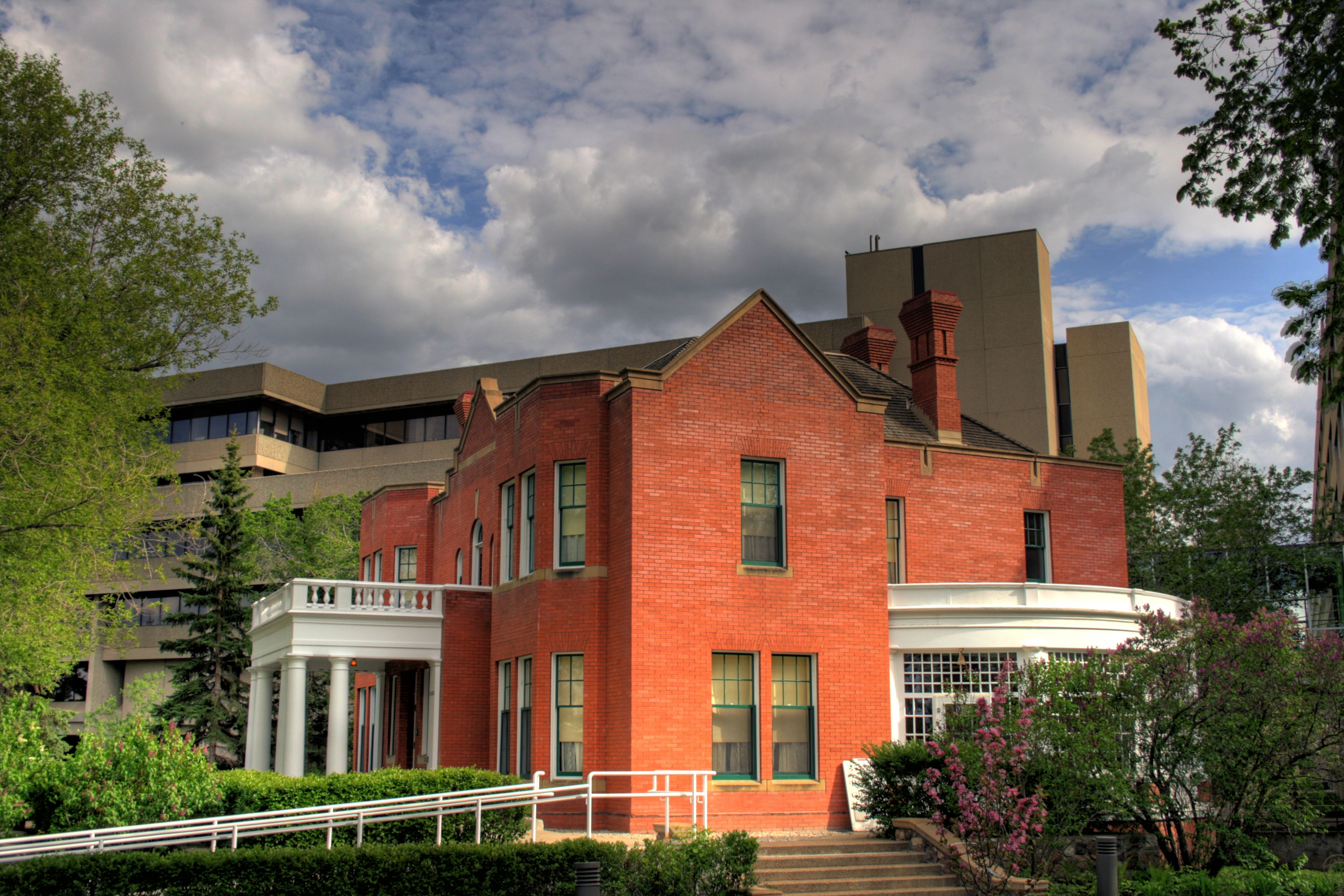
West view of Rutherford House on the grounds of the University of Alberta, Edmonton.

Through ACAT various types of transfer agreements exist. In program articulation, students in colleges and technical institutes' programs can transfer to the first or second year of another institution's program. Depending on whether the student is transferring after accumulating one year credits or two years credits, it is called a "one plus one" or "two plus two" transfer.

Credit transfer between institutions considers transferability at an individual course level. In some cases, a course may be considered the same at the sending institution as it is at the receiving institution (the course is a transfer course). In other cases, a course is considered sufficiently similar or meets discipline requirements even though there is not an equivalent course at the receiving institution (the course is considered transferable).

In addition to covering Alberta institutions, Aurora College in Northwest Territories, and Nunavut Arctic College in Nunavut are covered by ACAT.

In 2007, ACAT and the British Columbia Council on Admissions and Transfer agreed to a protocol regarding transfers between Alberta and British Columbia. The purpose of the protocol is to ensure that any student who satisfactorily completes course work in either Alberta or British Columbia, and wishes to transfer to an institution in the other may do so. This protocol is "in lieu of formal articulation because it is unlikely that the volume of students transferring to institutions in the other province will justify the resources necessary to undertake a formal articulation on a course-to-course basis."

=== Prior Learning Assessment and Recognition – PLAR ===
Many Alberta post-secondary programs have Prior Learning Assessment and Recognition (PLAR). PLAR recognizes learning can be obtained through means other than formal credit courses.

PLAR was in place prior to the change in the post-secondary act and is available in a wide variety of courses and programs. It continues to be a factor that aids in making post-secondary options accessible.

=== ApplyAlberta ===
In 2005, Alberta created a single online application system for 21 publicly funded post-secondary institutions called ApplyAlberta. By 2008 all 26 publicly funded post-secondary institutions were participating. The initiative serves two purposes: to facilitate entry into the post-secondary system for students, and to track the number of qualified applications, withdrawals, and other data to improve departmental planning.

=== eCampusAlberta ===
eCampusAlberta was a partnership of the 26 Alberta publicly funded post-secondary institutions that facilitated increased access to high quality online learning opportunities. The partnership allowed Alberta students living anywhere in the province to receive post-secondary education from any of the partnership's member institutions. Students could use the eCampusAlberta website to learn about and register in courses and programs and to choose their lead and partner institutions. eCampusAlberta ceased operation in March 2017; the impact on distance education enrolment is being assessed.

=== Dual Credit Policy ===
In May 2013, the Albertan Progressive Conservative Party released a document commissioned by Alison Redford, Premier at the time, entitled Provincial Dual Credit Strategy: Call to Action. This short policy detailed the party's vision for dual credit opportunities as they related to high school students transitioning to higher education on a career path, and included two phases: "From Vision to Action" and "From Implementation to Sustainability". Redford committed $11 million over three years to fund the development of this plan.

Between 2008 and 2011, the Alberta government funded dual credit pilot projects while, at the same time, individual school jurisdictions and post-secondary institutions negotiated separate non-government funded dual credit agreements. Through these dual credit opportunities, high school students participated in apprenticeship training and/or post-secondary, college or university courses while earning both high school and post-secondary credits for the same course.

The Dual Credit Strategy calls for an expansion of the network of partnerships between the government (school jurisdictions) and higher-education institutions, and provides an evolving database to a list of courses called "pathways" organized based on emerging with a particular designation or certification in the job market. A pathway is defined as "a selection of courses providing students with opportunities to explore and acquire the attitudes, skills, knowledge, and values for a potential career." Comprehensive Community Institutions, which focus on trade certification, and technical/vocational studies, make up the majority of the partnerships.

As of June 2015, there are 60 pathways available to students. The target students of this legislation, although available to all Albertan students, are explicitly listed as First Nations, Métis and Inuit students, those living in remote or rural communities, and students who are at risk of dropping out of high school.

=== Future challenges and improving access ===
Changing demographics in Alberta are likely to have a profound effect on post-secondary education. The majority of the population growth in Alberta is its urban centres – Edmonton, Calgary, Red Deer and Lethbridge – while the proportion of people living in small towns and rural areas is declining. Institutions based in rural communities will likely have challenges meeting enrolment targets while institutions in urban centres will face pressure in having enough capacity.

Meanwhile, although the number of people immigrating to Alberta has been increasing, persistent gaps between immigrant and non-immigrant Albertans' success in the labor market will impact the province's ability to attract and retain highly skilled individuals. Therefore, addressing the most challenging labor market barriers for new Canadians—the lack of Canadian work experience, the lack of recognition for foreign credentials, and language barriers—would support new Albertans and the province in meeting its current and future demographic, labour, and skill needs.

With their Business Plan priorities, the Ministry of Advanced Education indicates that it is committed to increasing access to learning opportunities. One of their focuses is to target under-represented groups in post-secondary, most notably First Nations, Metis and Inuit learners. The Access Advisory Council is a body appointed by the Ministry of Advance Education and Technology to provide advice in relation to the operation and reporting of the Access to the Future Fund.

Finally, the impact of dropping oil prices on the Alberta economy in spring 2015 will have significant impacts on Albertans' need to access higher education. Workers may need to return to the classroom to upgrade their skills to remain competitive in a weaker economy. Access to education at all levels remains a priority for Alberta as the province continues to invest in developing a strong knowledge-based economy rather than its historic heavy reliance on the natural resource industry.

== Structure ==
=== Public post-secondary institutional structure ===
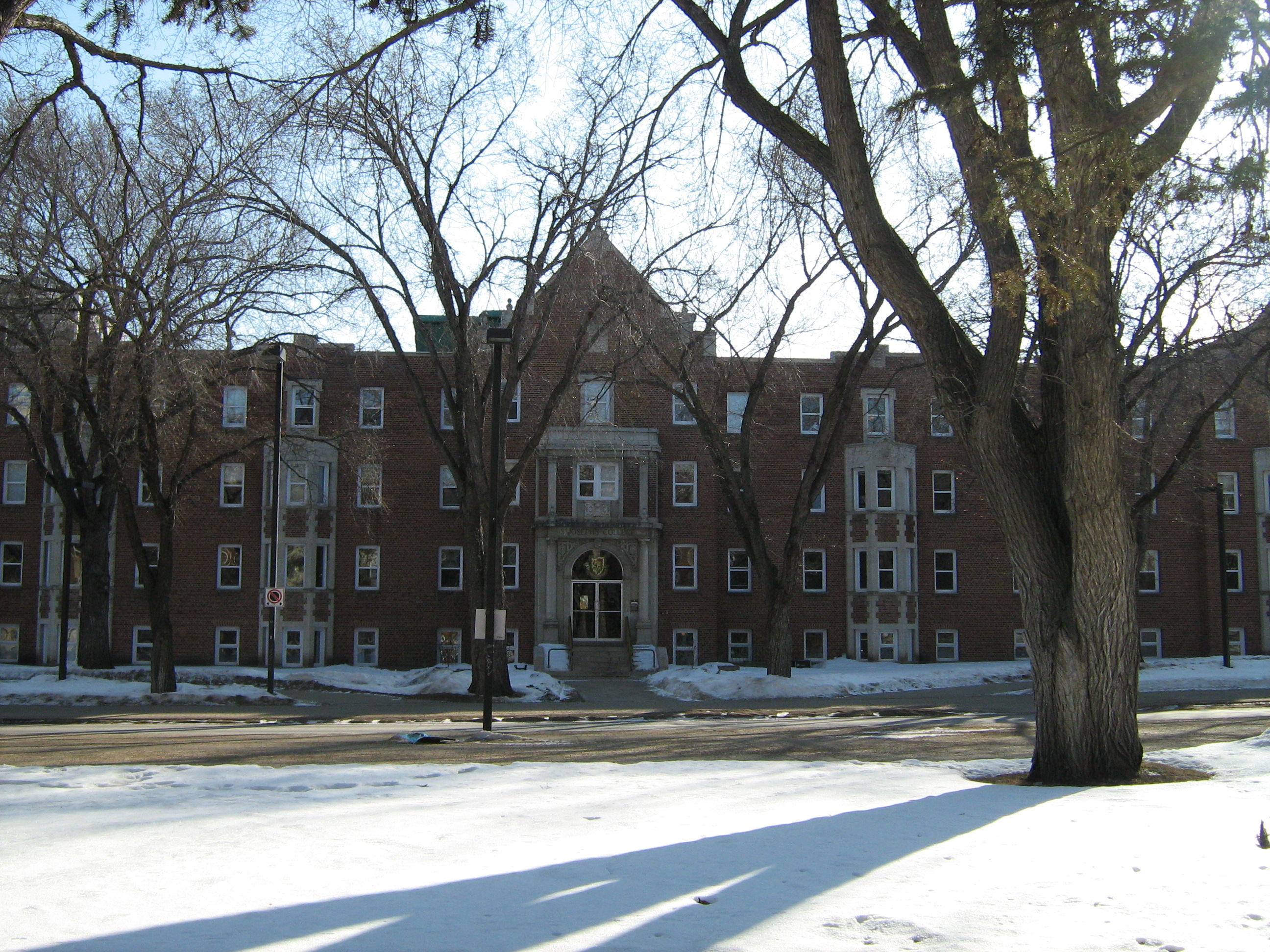
St. Joseph's College at the University of Alberta.

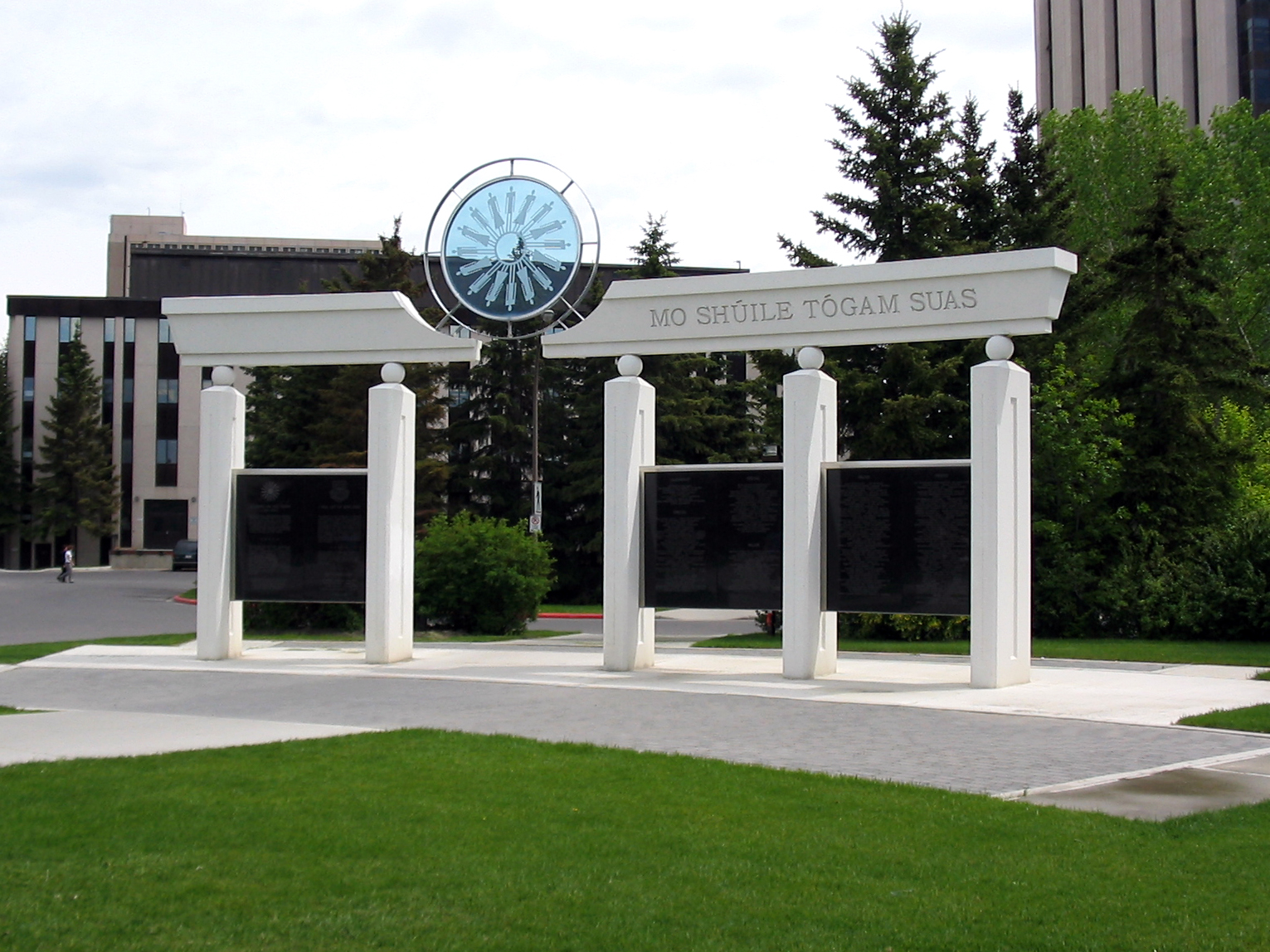
University of Calgary.

Alberta's public post-secondary system is organized into six categories or institutional designations. Collectively, these institutions offer a comprehensive set of certificates, diplomas, applied degrees, bachelors, masters and doctoral programs. Each public post-secondary institution has a mandate outlining the institution's direction in terms of programming, region and client group served. An institution's mandate is one of the guidelines used when new credit programs are considered for approval by the Ministry of Advanced Education. In 2007, the Ministry of Advanced Education developed a model that defines institutions according to their credentials, type and intensity of research activity, and geographic focus. The six categories or institutional designations are:

- Comprehensive Academic and Research Institutions (Athabasca University, University of Alberta, University of Calgary, University of Lethbridge)
- Baccalaureate and Applied Studies Institutions (MacEwan University, Mount Royal University)
- Polytechnic Institutions (e.g., NAIT, SAIT Polytechnic, Red Deer Polytechnic)
- Comprehensive Community Institutions (e.g., Bow Valley College, Keyano College, Lakeland College)
- Independent Academic Institutions (e.g., Ambrose University, King's University)
- Specialized Arts and Culture Institutions (e.g., Alberta University of the Arts, The Banff Centre)

=== Research structure ===
When Alberta established its six sector advanced education system in 2007, it also clearly defined roles and responsibilities for three categories of research: pure, applied, and scholarly.

Pure research is defined as exploratory and primarily conducted by Comprehensive Academic and Research Institutions (CARI). Applied research focuses on identification of solutions to specific areas, may involve third party engagement or funding, and is conducted by non- CARIs. Lastly, scholarly research encourages faculty members at non-CARIs to engage in research that supplements their instructional mandate, possibly in collaboration with a CARI.

With the clarity of roles established in the post-secondary system, Alberta's universities, colleges and technical institutes focus their mandates to contribute to the overall success of Alberta's research and innovation system. Provincial higher education research falls under the banner of Alberta Innovates.

=== Provincial legislation ===
Alberta has produced various acts to deal with post-secondary education over the course of its history. These acts were passed to regulate the development of different types of educational institutions established over time (see chronology). Most recently, the Ministry of Advanced Education proclaimed the Post-secondary Learning Act in 2004. This act is now the singular piece of legislation that takes the place of four previous acts (the universities, colleges, Banff Centre and technical institutes acts). The rationale for combining all these acts is to establish a framework to expand offerings of baccalaureate degrees beyond the universities and private degree granting university colleges. Public colleges and institutes under this act can grant degrees as well. Another reason for this move is: to promote better coordination between public post-secondary institutions; avoid duplication of functions; move toward a single seamless post-secondary system; and ensure efficient allocation of resources. The creation of Campus Alberta Quality Council as the body that examines proposals for new degrees is also part of the consolidated Post-secondary Learning Act.

==== Campus Alberta ====
In 2002, Alberta Learning released Campus Alberta, a document about the province's post-secondary system. Campus Alberta contains a set of guiding principles intended on fostering high quality, flexible learning opportunities for Alberta citizens. This document triggered changes in the post-secondary system, particularly to the acts that governed the different educational institutions. Although the concept has since evolved, this document set parameters around the emerging notion of lifelong learning. The key factors that encourage lifelong learning are:

- A global tendency towards a knowledge-based economy
- Globalization of international markets and growing competitive pressures
- Industry's need for an increasingly sophisticated and expanding workforce
- The positive impact education has on the individual and society at large.

Campus Alberta advocates for a learning system that is responsive and focused on the learner as well as innovative, collaborative, and accessible. In terms of accessibility and collaboration, the report recognizes the importance of both formal and informal learning opportunities as a way of earning credits for post-secondary education and encourages more articulation between post-secondary entities.

Now, the Campus Alberta Planning Resource has become an annual profile of Alberta's advanced education system, published by Alberta Advanced Education and Technology. The latest Campus Alberta Planning Resource was published in 2014. It provides a common source for data on demographics, enrolment, and economic factors that impact demand for post-secondary education and the capacity of post-secondary institutions to meet this demand. This helps to ensure that Campus Alberta can respond to the needs of learners, the economy, and society in all regions across the province.

== Governance ==
=== Ministry of Advanced Education ===
The public post-secondary system is overseen by the Ministry of Advanced Education. The ministry's role is to provide oversight and leadership, facilitate partnerships, and work with post-secondary stakeholders. Credit programs are approved and administered by Alberta Innovation and Advanced Education.

The Ministry of Advanced Education does not act in isolation but has a number of councils and boards to provide policies and guidelines. These include:

- Alberta Council on Admissions and Transfer
- Alberta Apprenticeship and Industry Training Board
- Alberta Post-Secondary Application System
- Campus Alberta Quality Council

=== Public post-secondary institutions ===
Public post-secondary institutions in Alberta have a bicameral governance structure. According to the Post-secondary Learning Act, each institution is governed by an autonomous Board of Governors. This entity provides strategic direction, establishes program offerings, approves admissions requirements, and promotes the development of the communities served by the institution.

In addition to the Board of Governors, colleges and technical institutes have academic councils that make recommendations to and reports for the Board of Governors in academic policy matters, such as election and admission of students; review and provision of courses and programs of instruction; and academic awards.

Universities in Alberta each have a senate whose main duty is to inquire into any matters that might benefit the university and enhance its position in the community. The senate also deals with academic matters. Reports on various matters are provided to the senate by the academic councils defined by the current legislation: a) General Faculties Council; b) Deans' Council; and c) Faculty and School Councils. The senate also requires reports from entities representing the student body such as the Council of Students Association and the Council of Graduate Students Association.

== Funding ==
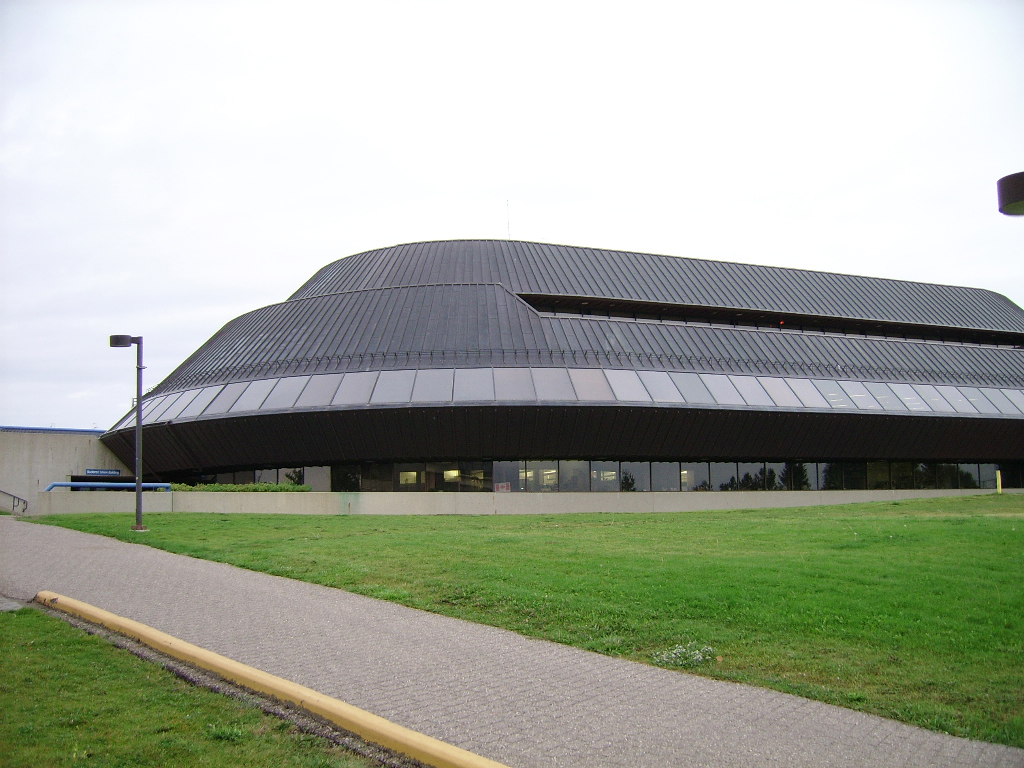
The Students' Union (SU) building at the University of Lethbridge in Lethbridge, Alberta

=== Responsibility and sources ===
The provincial government of Alberta provides monetary support to 26 post-secondary institutions. (See section: Publicly Funded Post-secondary Institutions) Although Alberta Advanced Education provides the majority of funding, post-secondary institutions raise additional funds by generating tuition and student fees; offering fee-based services; and offering non-credit and off-campus credit programming. A third source of funding comes from donations, sponsored research funding from provincial and federal agencies and private industry, and investments.

In principle the funding of post-secondary education in Alberta is a responsibility shared by students, their families and society. In a context of rising student costs, the Alberta government has set in place policies in areas such as tuition fees and financial assistance to ensure adequate levels of access and affordability.

=== Tuition fee policy ===
In order to ensure a reasonable contribution by the students to the costs of post-secondary education, the Alberta government regulates the payment of tuition fees. The tuition fee policy introduced in 1990 and amended in 1995 ensures that this direct monetary contribution does not exceed 30% of the cost of their education.

This policy requires public post-secondary institutions to charge the same fee to all residents of Canada and to impose a surcharge of 100% to all foreign students. Although students now contribute proportionately more toward the costs of their post-secondary education than they did in 1994–95, societal contributions have also increased.

=== Financial assistance ===
Alberta's student loan program is structured on the shared-cost principle. Loans are awarded on the basis of student need and parental contributions. Society contributes through loan forgiveness and servicing costs. Alberta's student financial assistance program has increased student loan levels as well as the number and value of non-repayable forms of financial assistance in a context marked by the rising cost of post-secondary education.

==== Alberta Centennial Education Savings Plan ====
In 2005 the Alberta Centennial Education Savings Plan (ACES) was created. This program aims to encourage parents to plan early for their children's future post-secondary education needs. ACES pays $500 into a Registered Education Savings Plan for any child born to or adopted by Alberta residents starting 1 January 2005. Additional $100 grants are available at ages 8, 11, and 14 to children enrolled in school, provided at least $100 has been contributed during the previous year.

=== Research funding ===
The Ministry of Advanced Education supports the research function of universities through base operations grants and envelope funding that finance the overall infrastructure required for research in the province. The research infrastructure includes not only physical resources, such as facilities and equipment, but also human resources, such as faculty and graduate students. In addition to the aforementioned mechanisms, a specific type of activity called sponsored research is supported externally by: a) federal research granting councils, b) non-profit, and c) industry sources. However, a significant proportion of this research is sponsored by provincial government sources as well. The allocation of resources for sponsored research is based on the experts' assessment of the qualities and potential of a particular project.

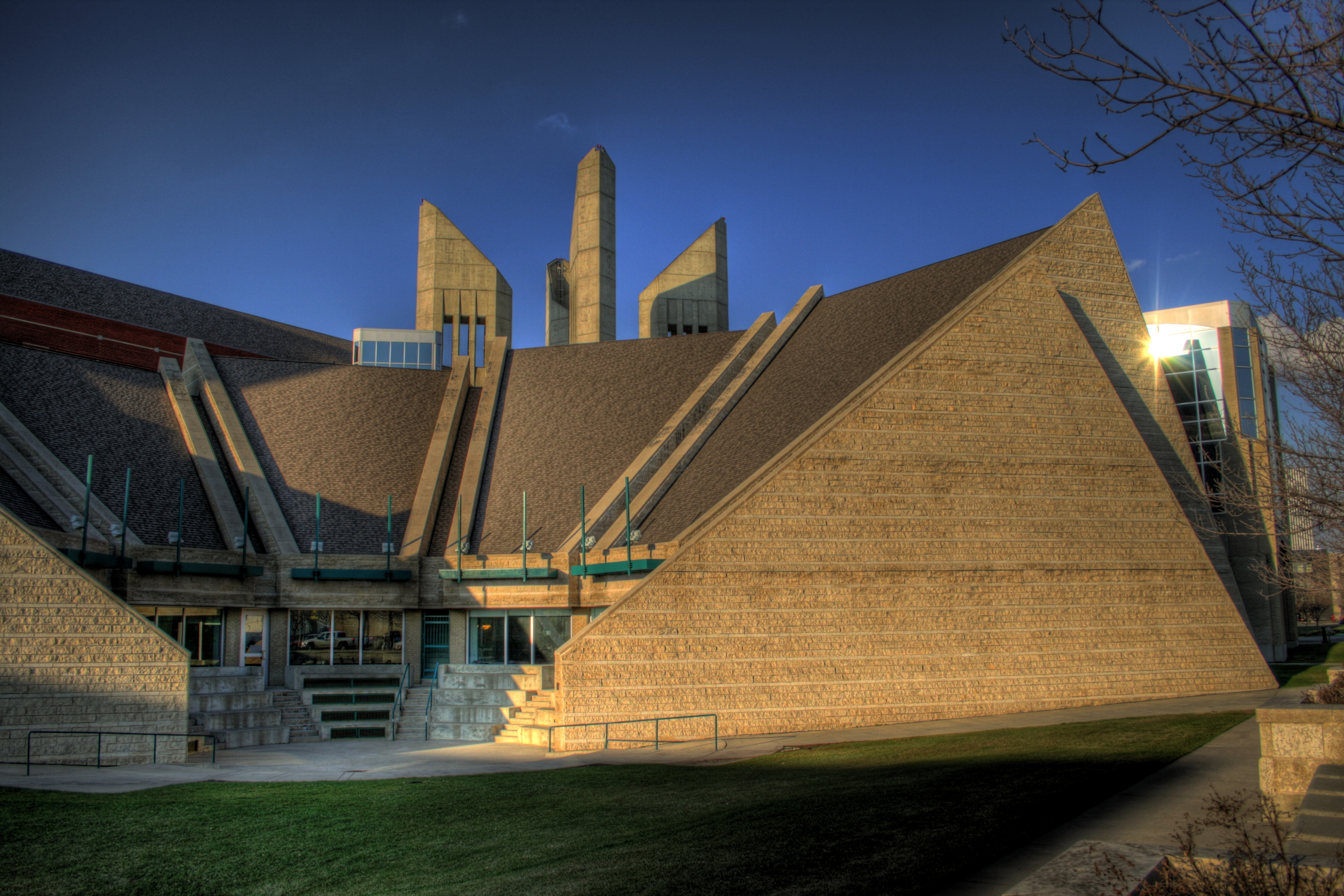
MacEwan University

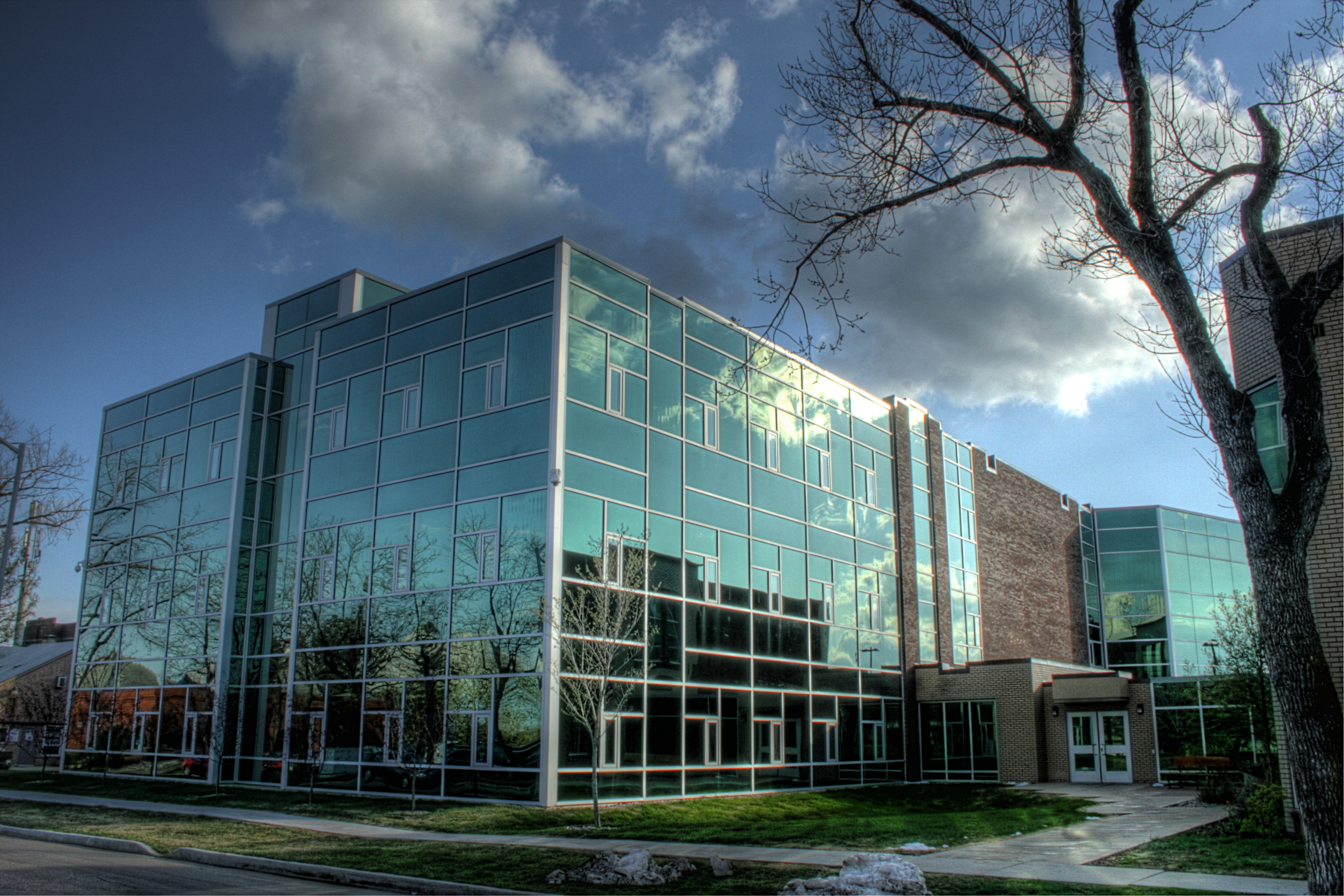
Hole Academic Centre at Concordia University College.

== See also ==
- List of universities in Canada
- List of colleges in Canada
- List of business schools in Canada
- List of law schools in Canada
- List of Canadian universities by endowment
- Higher education in Canada
- Education in Alberta
- List of colleges in Alberta
