= Alberta Advanced Education =

Agency overview
- Formed: 2004 (as individual ministry)
- Jurisdiction: Alberta
- Headquarters: Edmonton, Alberta
- Annual budget: C$6,156,143,000 (2019)
- Agency executives: Myles McDougall, Minister of Advanced Education; Rod Skura, Deputy Minister
- Website: https://www.alberta.ca/advanced-education.aspx

Alberta Advanced Education (also known as the Ministry of Advanced Education) is a ministry in the Executive Council of Alberta. Alberta Advanced Education is responsible for the public funding of post-secondary institutions in the province, in addition to loans and grants for post-secondary students.

The ministry has existed in its current form since 2004. However, two other ministries with the same title existed from 1971–1975 and 1983–1992. On April 30, 2019, Demetrios Nicolaides was appointed Minister of Advanced Education following the 2019 Alberta general election, replacing Marlin Schmidt.

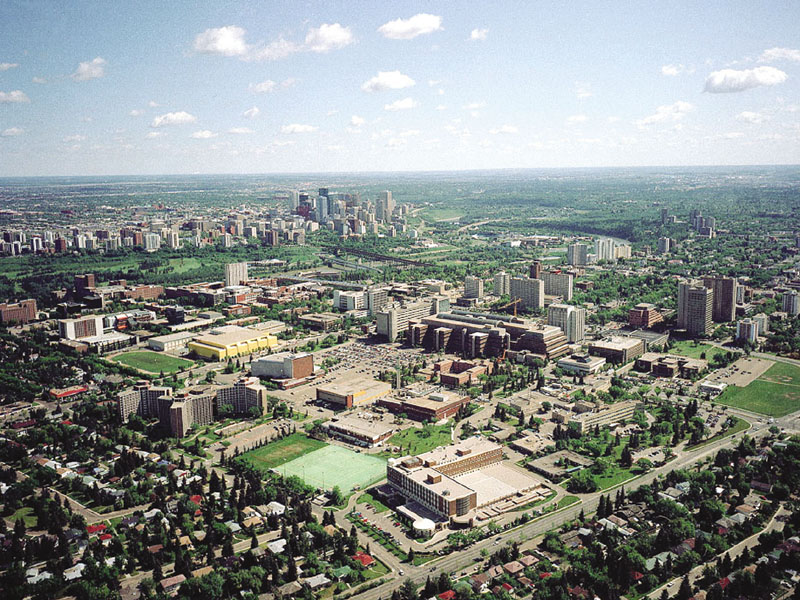
Aerial view of the University of Alberta North Campus, the oldest post-secondary institution in the province

== History ==
Alberta Advanced Education was founded on November 25, 2004 by an Order-in-Council, with Dave Hancock serving as inaugural minister. Alberta Advanced Education was created after the Ministry of Learning was split into the ministries of Education and Advanced Education.

Previously, the Advanced Education portfolio had changed hands across various ministries, including Advanced Education and Career Development (1992-1999) and Advanced Education and Manpower (1975-1983).

As of 2018, the ministry oversees institutions with a collective enrolment 263,495 students, with 17% of Albertans aged 17 to 34 enrolled in provincial post-secondary entities. Alberta Advanced Education's 2019 budget was $6,156,143,000, $5,700,030,000 (93%) of which was distributed directly to individual institutions.

== Minister of Advanced Education ==
Minister of Advanced Education
Affiliation	Name	Date appointed	Date departed	Premier(s)
United Conservative	Myles McDougall	May 16, 2025	Incumbent	Smith
United Conservative	Rajan Sawhney	June 9, 2023	May 15, 2025	Smith
United Conservative	Demetrios Nicolaides	April 30, 2019	June 8, 2023	Kenney; Smith
New Democratic	Marlin Schmidt	February 2, 2016	April 30, 2019	Notley
New Democratic	Lori Sigurdson	May 24, 2015	February 2, 2016	Notley
Progressive Conservative	Thomas Lukaszuk	February 4, 2013	24 May 2015	Redford; Hancock; Prentice
Progressive Conservative	Stephen Khan	May 8, 2012	February 4, 2013	Redford
Progressive Conservative	Greg Weadick	February 18, 2011	May 8, 2012	Stelmach
Progressive Conservative	Doug Horner	December 15, 2006	February 4, 2011	Stelmach
Progressive Conservative	Denis Herard	April 6, 2006	December 15, 2006	Klein
Progressive Conservative	Dave Hancock	November 25, 2004	April 5, 2006	Klein

== Provincial Institutions ==
Alberta Advanced Education divides public entities receiving funding into five groups in the ministry's annual report.

Comprehensive Academic Research Universities	Undergraduate Universities	Polytechnic Institutions	Comprehensive Community Colleges	Specialized Arts and Culture Institutions
Athabasca University; University of Alberta; University of Calgary; University of Lethbridge	Alberta University of the Arts; MacEwan University; Mount Royal University	Northern Alberta Institute of Technology; Southern Alberta Institute of Technology	Bow Valley College; Northwestern Polytechnic; Keyano College; Lakeland College; Lethbridge College; Medicine Hat College; NorQuest College; Northern Lakes College; Olds College; Portage College; Red Deer College	Banff Centre for Arts and Creativity

In addition, some independent institutions in the province receive funding from Alberta Advanced Education; these include Ambrose University, Burman University, Concordia University of Edmonton, St. Mary's University College, and The King's University College

== See also ==
- Higher education in Alberta
- List of universities in Canada
