= Olds College =

Public college in Olds, Alberta, Canada

Olds College of Agriculture & Technology
- Motto: "Transforming agriculture for a better world"
- Type: Public college
- Established: 1913
- Academic affiliations: UACC, CICan, AACTI
- President: Debbie Thompson
- Faculty: 108
- Administrative staff: 436
- Students: 1,997 (2023-24 fulltime equivalent)
- Location: Olds, Alberta, Canada; 51.790°N 114.095°W
- Colours
- Nickname: Broncos
- Sporting affiliations: CCAA
- Mascot: Billy the Bronco
- Website: www.oldscollege.ca

Olds College of Agriculture & Technology is an Alberta public post-secondary institution located in Olds, Alberta, established in 1913 as Olds Agricultural College.

Total student enrolment for the 2020–2021 academic year was 5446.

The college is a member of the Alberta Rural Development Network.

== History ==
In the year 1911, Olds College was operating as a provincially funded demonstration farm. On November 21, 1913 it opened as the Olds School of Agriculture and Home Economics, with W.J. Elliot as the principal. Students studied field husbandry, farm mechanics and domestic science. In addition, the provincial administration of the college was moved from the Ministry of Agriculture to the Ministry of Advanced Education at that time. In 2022, Olds College rebranded as Olds College of Agriculture & Technology.

== Campus ==
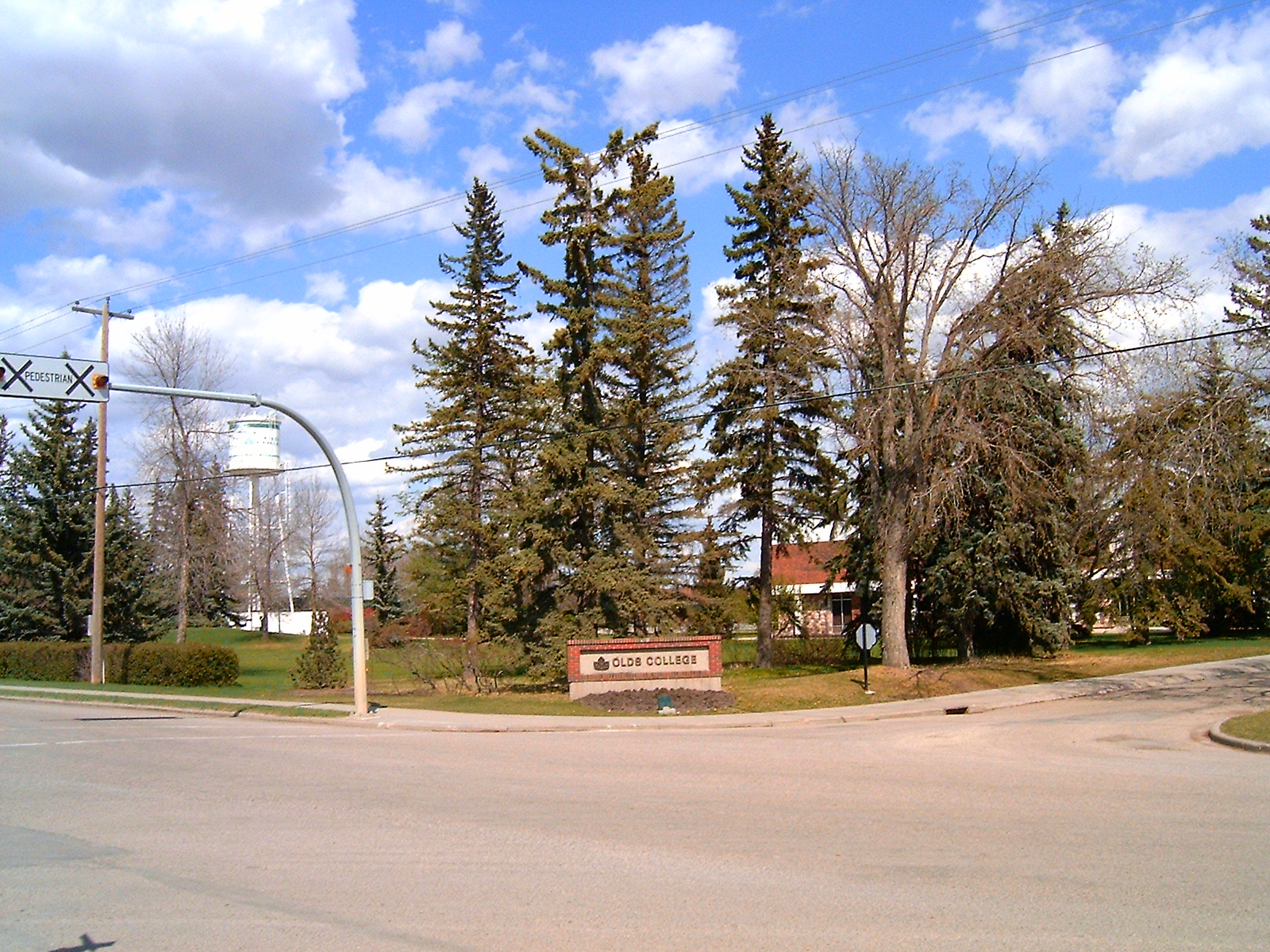
Olds College

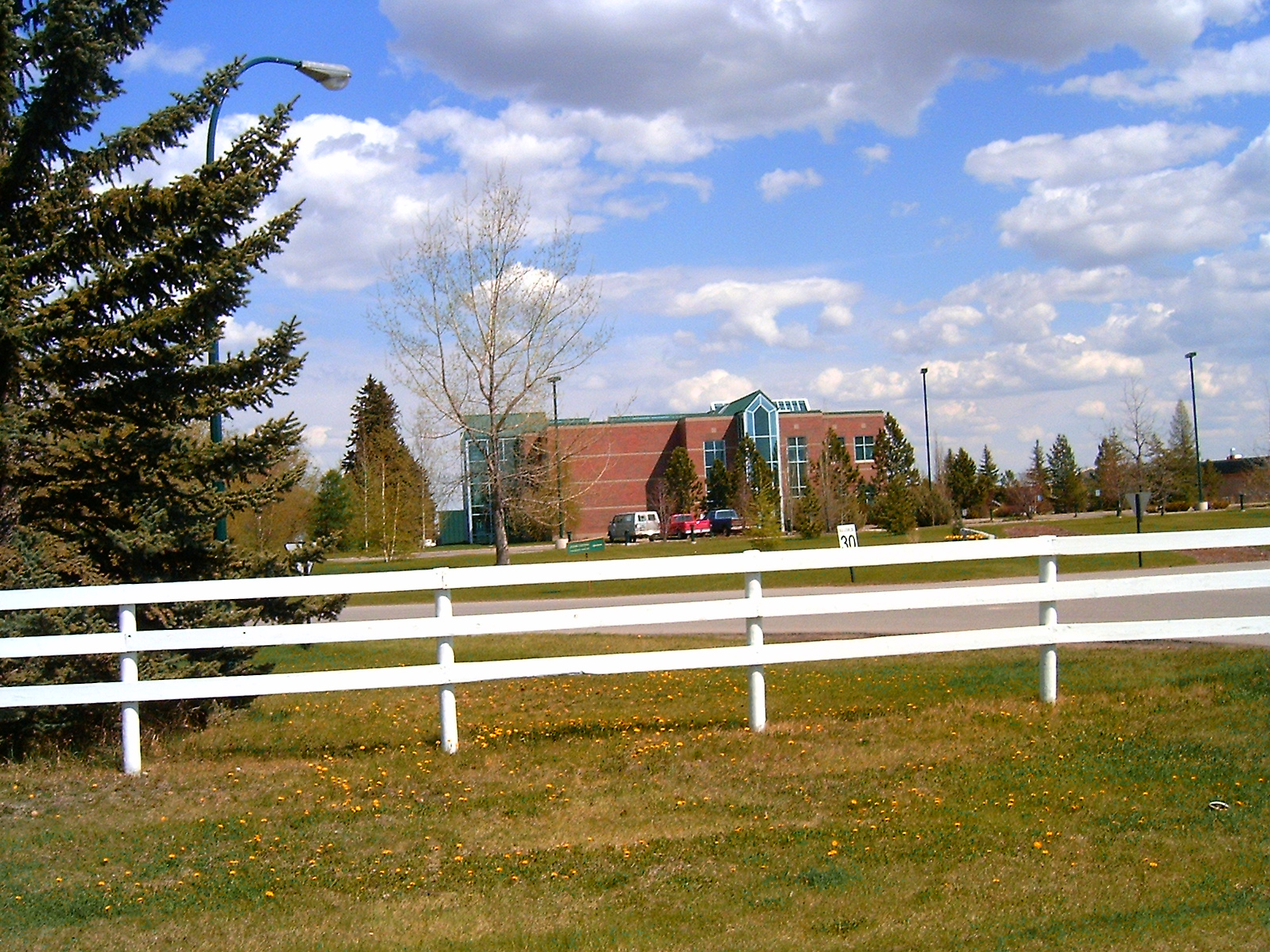
Olds College Building

Olds College of Agriculture & Technology is located on the eastern edge of the township of Olds. The campus covers over 3,600 acres (1,500 ha) including farmland in Didsbury, Carstairs, and Saskatchewan.

The Agriculture Learning Hub, opened in 2022, is home to the Werklund School of Ag Technology. These programs include Ag Management Diploma, Bachelor of Applied Science; Agribusiness, Precision Ag Techgronomy Diploma, and Land & Water Resources Diploma.

The Land Sciences building is connected to the Greenhouses and Landscape Pavilion and features classrooms, typically in use by Horticulture and Land & Environment Classes, as well as offices for faculty in those programs. Here students can specialize in programs like Environmental Stewardship & Rural Planning, Land Reclamation & Remediation, and Surface Land Management Majors.

The highlight of the Land Sciences Building is the atrium, a glass seating area filled with vegetation.

The Fine Arts Theatre opened in late 2008. The facility offers a 350+ seat theatre which is used for community events, high school drama productions and more. This building is offered in partnership between Olds College and Chinook's Edge School Division.

On-Campus residence includes Centennial Village featuring 450 student rooms and College Courts which feature 45 4-Bedroom Townhouses with kitchens.

The Learning Resource Centre (LRC) is home to the Library, Alumni Centre, Campus Store, Students’ Association offices, and the Bell E-Learning Centre The campus is also home to the Botanic Gardens and Treatment Wetlands and two riding arenas.

== Curriculum and degrees ==
Olds College of Agriculture & Technology offers 41 full-time programs. They are authorized by the Government of Alberta to grant certificates, diplomas, Bachelor of Applied Science Degrees and Apprenticeship designations.

In Fall 2023, the new Bachelor of Digital Agriculture Degree will launch. This four-year program will immerse students in global challenges in agriculture exploring solutions using digital agriculture technologies and practices.

== Scholarships and bursaries ==
Olds College offers over 475 scholarships, bursaries and awards annually, valued at over $555,000.

The Government of Canada sponsors an Aboriginal Bursaries Search Tool that lists over 680 scholarships, bursaries, and other incentives offered by governments, universities, and industry to support Aboriginal post-secondary participation. Olds College scholarships for Aboriginal, First Nations and Métis students include: TransAlta Aboriginal Educational Awards.

== Smart Farm & Research ==
The Olds College Centre for Innovation (OCCI) is the applied research division of Olds College. Olds College actively pursues involvement in applied research that advances innovation-based rural economic development in Alberta.

== Athletics ==
The Olds College Broncos compete in the ACAC Alberta Colleges Athletic Conference; sports include: basketball, women's hockey, soccer, volleyball, and futsal.

The college first entered the ACAC in 1966. Starting with Men’s & Women’s basketball later leaving to improve the college as a whole in 1993. They re-entered the league in 2001 after an eight year hiatus. 2012 was a huge year for the college as Mount Royal University withdrew from ACAC (badminton, basketball, futsal, golf, hockey, soccer and volleyball) to participate in CIS (Canada West) Olds College (OC) began participation in golf, soccer, basketball, and volleyball. The Broncos have 3 CCAA national championship gold medals to their name.

Olds College has an unusual athletic program. They participated in ACAL for basketball and volleyball from 2001-2014. At one point they had two basketball teams, one participating in the ACAL League and one in the ACAC. Players that couldn’t make the roster played on the varsity team to develop further.

Previous ACAC Championship’s

1967-1968 OAVC Women’s Volleyball

2012-2013 Women’s Basketball

2018-2019 Women’s Basketball

== Community Learning Campus ==
The Community Learning Campus (CLC) is a partnership approach to collaboratively delivering high school, post-secondary, and community education. The CLC addresses specific rural needs by sharing resources and working jointly with a variety of community groups and agencies. The CLC is a joint venture between Olds College and Chinook's Edge School Division (CESD) in collaboration with the Town of Olds, Mountain View County, and the University of Alberta. Integrated with the Olds College Campus, the CLC consists of five multi-use facilities complete with integrated programming.

Ralph Klein Centre is home to the Community Learning Campus, The CLC Fitness Centre, the Olds High School, and also has government administration offices. The facility was named after the late Ralph Klein, former premier of Alberta. The Ralph Klein Centre is also home to the Olds College Broncos, where they host the majority of their games.

== Notable people ==
Sharon Carry served as registrar and vice president of student and support services at Olds College.

== See also ==
- List of agricultural universities and colleges
- Education in Alberta
- List of universities and colleges in Alberta
- Canadian Colleges Athletic Association
