= Bow Valley College =

Canadian college

Coordinates: 43°00′29.84″N 81°16′18.82″W

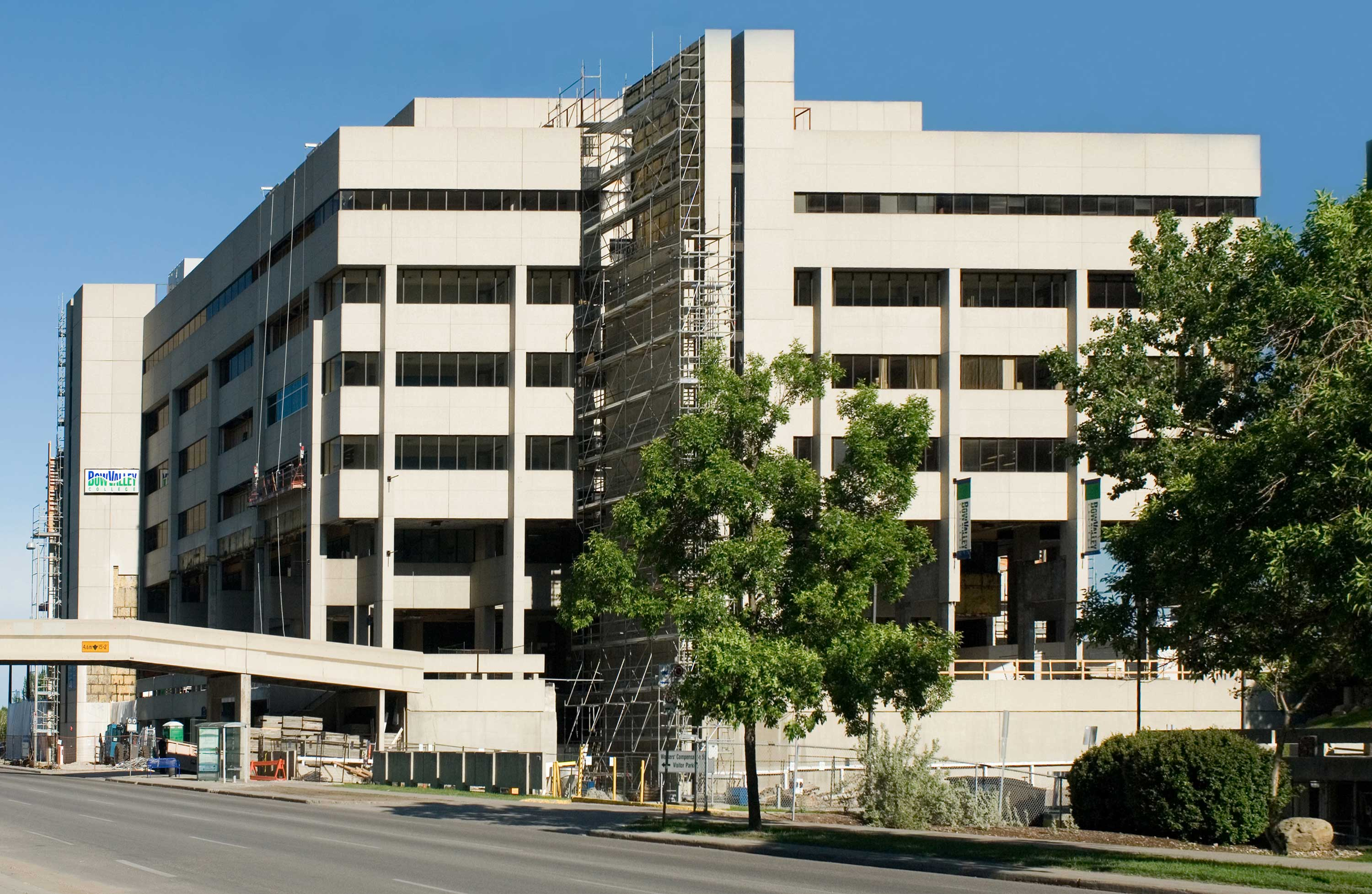
- Bow Valley College
- Former name: Alberta Vocational Centre
- Type: Public College (Canada)
- Established: 1965
- Affiliations: CICan, Alberta Association of Colleges & Technical Institutes, CBIE
- President: Dr. Misheck Mwaba
- Chair, Board of Governors: John Kousinioris
- Administrative staff: 1,400
- Students: 9,625 (2023-24 fulltime equivalent)
- Location: 345 6th Avenue SE, Calgary, Alberta, Canada
- Campus: Urban
- Colours: Blue
- Website: bowvalleycollege.ca

Bow Valley College is a comprehensive community college based primarily in Calgary, Alberta, Canada. The institution also operates regional campuses in Airdrie, Cochrane, and Okotoks as of 2025. As of 2024, the college serves a total enrolment of 9,550 full-load equivalents, and employs almost 1,400 full-, part-time, and casual employees.

== Programs ==
Bow Valley College offers one-year certificates and two-year diplomas for disciplines including business, health, community studies, creative technologies, academic upgrading, and English-language learning. Programs are provided in-class, online, or via blended delivery. The college also offers professional support and development services to newcomers to Canada.

Since September 2024, Bow Valley College has offered programs in game development, virtual reality, and animation. The college opened a digital entertainment production hub in May 2025, expanding its offerings in filmmaking.

=== Schools ===
As of 2025, Bow Valley College maintains specialized schools in the areas of business, community studies, health and wellness, technology, entertainment arts, foundational learning, and global access.

=== Health Care Centre of Excellence ===
Bow Valley College launched the Health Care Centre of Excellence (HCCE) in the fall of 2025, bringing together its collection of Health Care and social work programs with a focus on education and applied research.

Along with the flagship Practical Nursing Diploma program, the school also offers a Healthcare Aide Certificate, Interdisciplinary Therapy Assistant Diploma, Pharmacy Technician Diploma, Practical Nurse Diploma, and Perioperative Nursing for Registered Nurses. A Psychiatric Nurse Diploma was approved in the winter of 2026 with the first cohort scheduled to start in September 2026.

According to a press release in Feb 2026, the college also has 14 new health care programs under development, pending campus expansion. Demand for health programs is especially high with spaces filling up within a week of the application period opening. In February of 2026 the college reported between 2.5 and 3 applicants per available space in most health programs. Applications were closed for the new psychiatric nursing program after two weeks.

As of 2026, Bow Valley College’s Practical Nursing Program is the largest user of Virtual Reality health care simulation training in Canada. Using the UbiSim platform, students are able to earn credit for clinical hours in simulation with a focus on learning hospital procedures, scope of practice awareness and addressing unexpected changes in patients’ condition in a safe and organized environment. Applied Research studies headed by college instructors found simulation replaced early clinical hours with a 2:1 benefit for nursing students.

== History ==
=== Alberta Vocational Centre and campus: 1963-1997 ===
The institution that would become Bow Valley College, the Alberta Vocational Centre–Calgary, opened in 1965 after the Government of Alberta received federal funding to introduce adult continuing education and job readiness programs. Informal courses that provided the basis for the Centre's offerings had begun in the basement of SAIT a few years earlier, in 1963.

In its earliest years, the Centre operated out of temporary quarters, beginning with a vacant car dealership showroom. In 1972, the Centre received a permanent location in Downtown Calgary, on 3rd Street and 6th Avenue Southeast (today known as its North Campus). By 1990, the Centre served 6,500 full-time students and 15,000 part-time students.

=== Becoming a college and expansion: 1997-2018 ===
The Centre became a college in 1997, transitioning from a government-administered body to an autonomous public post-secondary governed by a board. Sharon Carry was appointed to serve as president and chief executive officer, succeeding Nancy Lynch. A year later, the institution adopted the name Bow Valley College to reflect the region (the Bow Valley) it serves.

In 2010, construction began on a second campus for the college, which had been considering expansion since 2002. Bow Valley's South Campus, located opposite Calgary's City Hall, opened in May 2013. Later that year, the college launched its Iniikokaan Aboriginal Centre (a Blackfoot term meaning "buffalo lodge"), offering programs targeted at Indigenous students. Shawn Atleo attended its opening.

After two decades of service, Carry retired at the end of 2016. She was replaced by Laura Jo Gunter, a former administrator at George Brown College. Bow Valley established a School of Creative Technologies in 2017, and a regional campus in Cochrane in 2018.

=== Current operations: 2019-present ===
The Government of Alberta announced funding cuts to public post-secondaries in 2019. Bow Valley College was reportedly the "hardest hit," alongside MacEwan University. The next year, Bow Valley College closed its Canmore satellite campus, citing a decrease in both enrolments and provincial funding.

In April 2020, Bow Valley College's health sciences students were among the Alberta-based learners whose graduations were fast-tracked in order to improve the province's response to the COVID-19 pandemic. This followed a media push by students requesting to help. The next month, Gunter left her post to become the new president and CEO of NAIT. She was replaced by Dr. Misheck Mwaba.

Bow Valley College underwent a rebrand in 2021 to its current crest, described as an "abstract landscape" that represents the five values its employees deemed the most important: respect, creativity, inclusion, resilience, and teamwork. In 2023, the college was redesignated as a comprehensive community college by the Ministry of Advanced Education. In November that year, the college received $5.5 million in funding from Calgary's municipal government for a new digital production hub, which would ultimately open in 2025.

In January 2024, Bow Valley College was named one of Alberta's Top 75 Employers. Its South Campus became the host of Calgary's first esports arena in September, to expand its programming in game development and related technologies. The college established a varsity esports team named the Bow Valley College Bears.

Bow Valley celebrated its 60th year in 2025. In September, Mwaba was reappointed for a second term as president and CEO. The college announced in November that it had received an undisclosed "transformative" donation from Calgary-based philanthropists, Esmail and Safana Bharwani. To honour the gift, which will create a new endowment for student awards, Bow Valley announced its intention to rename its School of Arts and Sciences to the Bharwani School of Arts and Sciences. In December, Bow Valley College was ranked 30th by Research Infosource's annual rankings of Canada's top 50 research colleges.

== Associated organizations ==
Bow Valley College is a member of the Alberta Rural Development Network and Colleges and Institutes Canada.

== Regional facilities ==
As of 2025, Bow Valley College operates regional campuses in Airdrie, Cochrane, and Okotoks.

== Student government ==
Students receive representation and services through the Students' Association of Bow Valley College (SABVC), a students' union. Independent from the college, SABVC supports student clubs on campus, provides scholarships, and manages a health and dental plan for learners. SABVC also hosts events to promote student wellbeing and advocates for students on provincial matters to Alberta Advanced Education. Through the Calgary Student Alliance, SABVC works in partnership with other local students' associations.

In 2017, SABVC donated $1.25 million to Bow Valley College, believed to be the largest donation from a students' union to a community college in Alberta's history. The college's president, Laura Jo Gunter, described it as a "tremendous act of generosity." In 2023, SABVC and the college lobbied the City of Calgary to rename the light rail transit station near its downtown campus. The stop was renamed City Hall / Bow Valley College in September.

== Controversies ==
Bow Valley College was allegedly defrauded by a director in 2008, who diverted $189,000 in institutional funds to businesses owned by himself or family members.

A 2013 investigation by the Office of the Information Privacy Commissioner found that the college had failed to protect personal information, following the leak of data relating to 189,300 students and 3,500 employees.

The college has gone on to make significant upgrades to its digital security. In June 2024 it became the first and only post-secondary institution to achieve Trusted Cloud Provider and CSA Star Level 1 designation by the international Cloud Security Alliance. It has also played host to network security and hacker events including BSides Calgary which bring together the institution's in-house technical security skills and students from IT programs within the School of Technology.

== See also ==
- Education in Alberta
- List of universities and colleges in Alberta
- Higher education in Alberta
- Canadian government scientific research organizations
- Canadian university scientific research organizations
- Canadian industrial research and development organizations
