= List of colleges in Alberta =

Colleges in Alberta may refer to several types of educational institutions. College in Canada most commonly refers to a career-oriented post-secondary institution that provides vocational education or education in applied arts, applied technology and applied science. These publicly funded institutions are known as comprehensive community colleges and polytechnic institutions and provide apprenticeships, certificates, and diploma programs. Comprehensive community colleges may also provide undergraduate programs in collaboration with a university, while polytechnic institutions may also provide select undergraduate programs approved by the provincial government.

In addition to publicly funded institutions, several privately funded post-secondary institutions also use the term college in their name. This includes private career colleges licensed by the province, faith-based institutions, and several other types of post-secondary institutions.

== Public institutions ==
All publicly funded post-secondary institutions, including comprehensive community colleges, polytechnic institutions, and other institutions like the Banff Centre are governed under provincial legislation called the Post-secondary Learning Act.

=== Comprehensive community colleges ===
Comprehensive community colleges are publicly funded post-secondary institutions with a focus on providing vocational skills in specific fields, as well as providing continuing education programs and academic upgrading needed for admission into other institutions (like universities in Alberta). These institutions may conduct research that supports economic and social development in their region.

These institutions provide certificate and diploma programs. These institutions may also provide apprenticeships for technical training programs and undergraduate programs in collaboration with a university.

The following is a list of publicly funded comprehensive community colleges:

Institution	Main campus (Note: In addition to their main campuses, several comprehensive community colleges may also operate regional/satellite campuses in other municipalities inside their geographic service area.)	Primary geographic service area	Founded
Bow Valley College	Calgary	Calgary Metropolitan Region	1965
Keyano College	Fort McMurray	Northeastern Alberta	1965
Lakeland College	Lloydminster	East Central Alberta	1913
Medicine Hat College	Medicine Hat	Southeastern Alberta	1965
NorQuest College	Edmonton	Edmonton Metropolitan Region	1965
Northern Lakes College	Slave Lake	North Central Alberta	1999
Olds College	Olds	Central Alberta	1913
Portage College	Lac La Biche	East Central Alberta	1968

=== Polytechnic institutions ===
Polytechnic institutions are publicly funded post-secondary institutions with a focus on industry and vocational training, as well as technical programming. These institutions also provide programs for academic upgrading and continuing education programs. These institutions may conduct research and scholarly activities that align with the credentials they offer or are focused on strengthening economic development in the province.

These institutions provide apprenticeships, certificate, and diploma programs. These institutions may also provide select undergraduate programs approved by the provincial government.

The following is a list of publicly funded comprehensive community colleges:

Institution	Location	Primary geographic service area	Founded
Lethbridge Polytechnic	Lethbridge	Southwestern Alberta	1957
Northern Alberta Institute of Technology	Edmonton	Northern Alberta	1962
Northwestern Polytechnic	Grande Prairie	Northwestern Alberta	1966
Red Deer Polytechnic	Red Deer	Central Alberta	1964
Southern Alberta Institute of Technology	Calgary	Southern Alberta	1916

=== Other public institutions ===
There is one publicly funded institution in Alberta with a specialized focus on the fine arts and culture, the Banff Centre for Arts and Creativity, based in Banff. As opposed to other publicly funded comprehensive community colleges and polytechnic institutions, the Banff Centre services the entire province. The Banff Centre provides certificate and diploma programs and is permitted to conduct research and scholarly activities that align with the credentials they offer.

== Private institutions ==
=== Private career college ===
There are over 190 private career colleges based in Alberta that offer various career training and vocational programs. All private career colleges are licensed under the Provincial Vocational Training Act and its related regulations.

Although these institutions are privately operated and financed, the provincial government monitors private career colleges by requiring them to submit annual reports on student graduation and job placement rates as well as through compliance reviews. A private career college's licence can be revoked by the provincial government if graduation and job placement rates are below 70 per cent for four consecutive reporting periods.

=== Faith-based institutions ===
There are 12 faith-based institutions in Alberta. Many of these institutions are privately operated and funded, although some are affiliated with a public university in Alberta. These institutions offer bachelor of theology programs, and may also be approved to provide select degree programs by the provincial government.

The following is a list of designated faith-based institutions based in Alberta:

Institution	Location	Founded
Alberta Bible College	Calgary	1932
Canadian Lutheran Bible Institute	Camrose	1932
Canadian Baptist Theological Seminary and College	Cochrane	1987
Clearwater College	Caroline	1971
Concordia Lutheran Seminary	Edmonton	1984
Newman Theological College	Edmonton	1964
Peace River Bible Institute	Sexsmith	1934
Prairie College	Three Hills	1922
Rocky Mountain College	Calgary	1992
Rosebud School of the Arts	Rosebud	1973
St. Stephen's College	Edmonton	1908
Vanguard College	Edmonton	1942

=== Other types of privately funded "colleges" ===
In addition to private career colleges and faith-based institutions, there exist several post-secondary flight schools and language schools that also use the term college in their name. However, the majority of these institutions do not use the term in their name.

== See also ==
- Education in Alberta
- Higher education in Alberta
- Higher education in Canada
- List of business schools in Canada
- List of Canadian universities by endowment
- List of colleges in Canada
- List of law schools in Canada
- List of universities in Canada
