= Alberta Association of Colleges & Technical Institutes =

The Alberta Association of Colleges & Technical Institutes (AACTI) is an organization advocating for Alberta's 16 public colleges and technical institutes. AACTI operates out of two locations; a head office in Edmonton and an innovation office at the Olds College School of Innovation (OCSI).

== History ==
Alberta public colleges and technical institutes have had an informal association since 1990. In 1992, the Council of Presidents and the Council of Board Chairs for the 12 public colleges and institutes became more formalized and an Executive Assistant was hired to provide support to the two councils. Sharon Carry was one of the original founders of the organization.

In August 2002, the Alberta Association of Colleges & Technical Institutes (AACTI) was incorporated under the Societies Act of Alberta.

== Membership ==
- Alberta College of Art and Design
- Banff Centre
- Bow Valley College
- Grande Prairie Regional College
- Grant MacEwan College
- Keyano College
- Lakeland College
- Lethbridge College
- Medicine Hat College
- Northern Alberta Institute of Technology
- NorQuest College
- Northern Lakes College
- Olds College
- Portage College
- Red Deer College
- SAIT Polytechnic
