= Alberta Colleges Athletics Conference =

The Alberta Colleges Athletic Conference (ACAC) is the governing body for collegiate sports in Alberta, Canada. Founded in 1964, as the Western Inter-College Conference, the ACAC is represented by eighteen schools, including one in Saskatchewan, that compete in ten sports.

The ACAC is a member of the Canadian Colleges Athletic Association, and provincial champions compete for national collegiate titles.

== Teams ==
- Ambrose University Lions in Calgary, Alberta
- University of Alberta Augustana Campus Vikings in Camrose, Alberta
- Briercrest College and Seminary Clippers in Caronport, Saskatchewan
- Concordia University of Edmonton Thunder in Edmonton, Alberta
- Keyano College Huskies in Fort McMurray, Alberta
- King's University Eagles in Edmonton, Alberta
- Lakeland College (Alberta) Rustlers in Vermilion, Alberta
- Lethbridge College Kodiaks in Lethbridge, Alberta
- Medicine Hat College Rattlers in Medicine Hat, Alberta
- Northern Alberta Institute of Technology Ooks in Edmonton, Alberta
- Northwestern Polytechnic Wolves in Grande Prairie, Alberta
- Olds College Broncos in Olds, Alberta
- Portage College Voyageurs in Lac La Biche, Alberta
- Prairie College Pilots in Three Hills, Alberta
- Red Deer Polytechnic Kings/Queens in Red Deer, Alberta
- SAIT Polytechnic Trojans in Calgary, Alberta
- St. Mary's University Lightning in Calgary, Alberta

== Sports ==
Conference sports
Sport	Men's	Women's	Mixed
Badminton	✓	✓	✓
Basketball	✓	✓	
Cross country	✓	✓	
Curling	✓	✓	✓
Futsal	✓	✓	
Golf	✓	✓	
Ice Hockey	✓	✓	
Soccer	✓	✓	
Indoor Track	✓	✓	
Volleyball	✓	✓	

== See also ==
- Canadian Colleges Athletic Association
