= NorQuest College =

Public community college in Edmonton, Alberta, Canada

- Former name: Alberta Vocational College
- Type: Community college
- Established: 17 February 1965
- Affiliations: CICan, CCAA, AACTI, CBIE
- President: Carolyn Campbell
- Students: 11,374 (2023-24 fulltime equivalent)
- Location: 10215 108 Street NW; Edmonton, Alberta, Canada; T5J 1L6; 53.54334°N 113.50650°W
- Campus: Urban/suburban/remote (downtown,Wetaskiwin, Whitecourt
- Website: NorQuest College

NorQuest College is a publicly funded, post-secondary institution in Edmonton, Alberta, Canada. The student body is approximately 12,435 full-time or part-time credit students, and approximately 7,876 non-credit or continuing education students. Approximately 1,879 students graduate each year.

== History ==
NorQuest College, formerly Alberta Vocational College (AVC), was officially established by the Government of Alberta in 1965 with the primary objective of providing untrained and under-employed Albertans with the opportunity to develop skills required in an industrialized workforce. In 1965, AVC consisted of four academic upgrading classrooms, a space housing 60 business education students, a barber shop, a beauty culture lab, and a welding and equipment maintenance shop. There were additional programs offered at separate locations in Edmonton. With government plans to construct a central downtown site for the college in 1970, these programs would all be offered under the same roof by 1971 and total student enrolment would rise to 2,300 in 1972 from 550 in 1966. New programs were developed and existing programs expanded and revised to accommodate the educational needs of an increasing student body.

== Governance ==
NorQuest College became board governed in 1998 and operates under the authority of the Post-secondary Learning Act and is responsible to the Minister of Advanced Education. The board has 14 members.

== Campus ==
NorQuest College's main campus is located in downtown Edmonton off 102 Ave and 108 Street. The campus consists of three buildings: the Civic Employees Legacy Tower, the Singhmar Centre for Learning, and Centre 106.

The Singhmar Centre for Learning is the newest building that finished construction in 2017. It consists of four floors and includes a food services area, The Core bookstore, the Centre for Growth and Harmony where students can receive free health and wellness support, the Miyo-pimâtisiwin Centre for Indigenous students, and the Intercultural Child & Family Centre. On the second floor, students and visitors will find the Learner Centre that includes library services, academic coaching services, a computer commons area, and more.

The Civic Employees Legacy Tower includes the Office of Registrar on the first floor where students can speak with college representatives about their upcoming courses, fees, and documents. It also houses another food services area and offices for student advisors and recruiters.

In addition to the Edmonton campus, NorQuest has a regional campus in Wetaskiwin. Students can take Academic Upgrading, the Health Care Aide certificate, or the Practical Nurse diploma there. They can also receive student advising, tutoring, and Elder support.

NorQuest provides education services to students at the Fort Saskatchewan Correctional Centre and the Edmonton Remand Centre. Each week, approximately 150 students take academic upgrading, personal development, or employment training courses.

On September 21, 2023, NorQuest College opened the Miyonohk (pronounced mee-yo-nook) park at their Edmonton campus. Meaning "a good place" in Cree, the park is a place where students, staff, and the public can study, gather, and socialize. The park measures approximately 2,700 square meters and provides a striking green space on the east side of NorQuest's campus. The name was gifted to the college by Indigenous Elders and cultural advisors.

== Programs ==
NorQuest College offers over 60 programs. Known for providing a work-relevant education that aligns with the tasks performed on the job, NorQuest's programs are accredited and industry recognized.

NorQuest College offers one of the largest and most prestigious Practical Nursing diploma programs across Canada.

NorQuest College also offers a Social Work diploma,[1] Pharmacy Technician diploma, Business Administration diploma, Medical Device Reprocessing Technician certificate, Health Care Aide certificate, Machine Learning Analyst diploma, and Early Learning and Child Care diploma and certificate. NorQuest also offers Academic Upgrading, Canadian Adult Education Credential (CAEC) preparation, Open Studies, and ESL training, including the popular LINC and ESL Intensive programs.

Through non-credit and continuing education programs, students can explore a wide range of topics in aviation, management, insurance, supply chain, and more. One of their most popular non-credit options is the Flight Attendant program.

== Centres and institutions ==
NorQuest College also offers services, consulting, and training through their centres and institutes.

=== Indigenous Career Center ===
The Indigenous Career Center - ICC (Formerly the Alberta Indigenous Construction Career Centre -AICCC) connects prospective Indigenous workers with employers recruiting for construction related careers. It is a partnership with NorQuest College, the Government of Alberta, Indigenous communities, and industry organizations.

=== Colbourne Centre for Inclusive Leadership ===
The Colbourne Institute for Inclusive Leadership provides customized Equity, Diversity, and Inclusion (EDI) training for leaders in Edmonton and across Canada. They develop strategies based on their partners' unique EDI goals and needs and provides the tools and resources to help organizations reach these goals.

== Awards and recognitions ==
In 2023, NorQuest College won Bronze for the CiCAN's Excellence in Equity, Diversity, and Inclusion Award.

NorQuest was also recognized as a Corporate Culture Winner by Canada's Most Admired in the non-profit and broader public sector category. They also won the award previously in 2017 and 2020.

In addition, NorQuest is recognized as one of Canada's Top 50 Research Colleges by Research info Source Inc. NorQuest conducts research in five main areas: Equity, Diversity, Inclusion, and Accessibility in the Workplace, Community and Social Innovation, Business and Industry Solutions, Health Innovation, Practice, and Programing, and Higher Educational Innovation and Trends.

== See also ==
- List of universities and colleges in Alberta
- Education in Alberta
- Canadian Interuniversity Sport
- Canadian government scientific research organizations
- Canadian university scientific research organizations
- Canadian industrial research and development organizations
