= Northwestern Polytechnic =

Community college in Alberta, Canada

- Former names: Grande Prairie Junior College, Grande Prairie Regional College
- Type: Polytechnic
- Established: 1966
- Affiliations: CICan, CCAA, U Sports, University of the Arctic, ACU, ACAC, AACT
- President: Vanessa Sheane
- Students: 2,227 (2024-25 fulltime equivalent)
- Location: Grande Prairie, Alberta, Canada; 55°10′31.77″N 118°49′6.25″W
- Campus: Urban
- Colours: Dark blue, light blue, pink and yellow
- Nickname: Wolves
- Website: www.nwpolytech.ca

Northwestern Polytechnic (NWP), previously known as Grande Prairie Regional College (GPRC) is a publicly funded educational institution located in northwestern Alberta, Canada.

Founded in 1966 as Grande Prairie Junior College with Dr. Henry Anderson as Dean, the institution officially honoured the first student body of 101 charter students on April 21, 1967.

NWP currently operates campuses in Grande Prairie, Alberta, and has a laboratory and research presence through its National Bee Diagnostic Centre (NBDC), located in Beaverlodge, Alberta. It formerly had a campus in Fairview.

The Polytechnic is the largest post-secondary institution in northern Alberta, offering certificate, diploma, apprenticeship, and undergraduate programs across four schools dedicated to Applied Science and Technology, Business, Health, and Skilled Trades.

NWP has over 3,800 total attending students as of 2025.

== History ==
Northwestern Polytechnic was opened as the Grande Prairie Junior College in 1966. Four years later, the institution was renamed Grande Prairie Regional College, and in 1974, classes were first started in a purpose-built, curvilinear facility designed by famed Canadian architect Douglas Cardinal.

During the 1990's the campus footprint broadened, as did program offerings. In 1991, an addition to the Grande Prairie campus, designed by architects Field, Field, and Field, was officially opened. In September 1995, GPRC established its first degree pathway, the Bachelor of Applied Forest Resource Management.

In 2009, Fairview College was folded into GPRC, expanding the college into two campuses located 115 km apart.

In January 2020, the province of Alberta announced a new performance-based funding model for colleges and universities. In March, GPRC announced significant budget reductions. In May, GPRC eliminated 85 staff positions and 2 programs, and later that month, the government of Alberta announced that GPRC would not become a university and move toward polytechnic status instead. In August 2021, GPRC appointed another new president, Justin Kohlman, the third in under five months. Kohlman's term, which ended abruptly after less than two years, was noted for a lack of transparency. On December 9, 2021, the government of Alberta approved the name change for the institution, officially becoming Northwestern Polytechnic.

In September 2025 the province announced a $1million dollar investment to expand the trades program.

Northwestern Polytechnic has announced that the Fairview campus will be closed at the end of the 2025-26 academic year.

== Research ==
In the spring of 2007, the school's Centre of Research and Innovation was established, and the National Bee Diagnostic Centre (NBDC) in Beaverlodge was opened in 2012. Now a designated Technology Access Centre (TAC), the NBDC provides comprehensive and diagnostic services and testing for the beekeeping industry. In addition, The centre plays a role in selective breeding and scientific testing for fraudulent honey.

In 2013, GPRC achieved eligibility to apply for research funds from the Social Sciences and Humanities Research Council (SSHRC).

== Academic programs ==
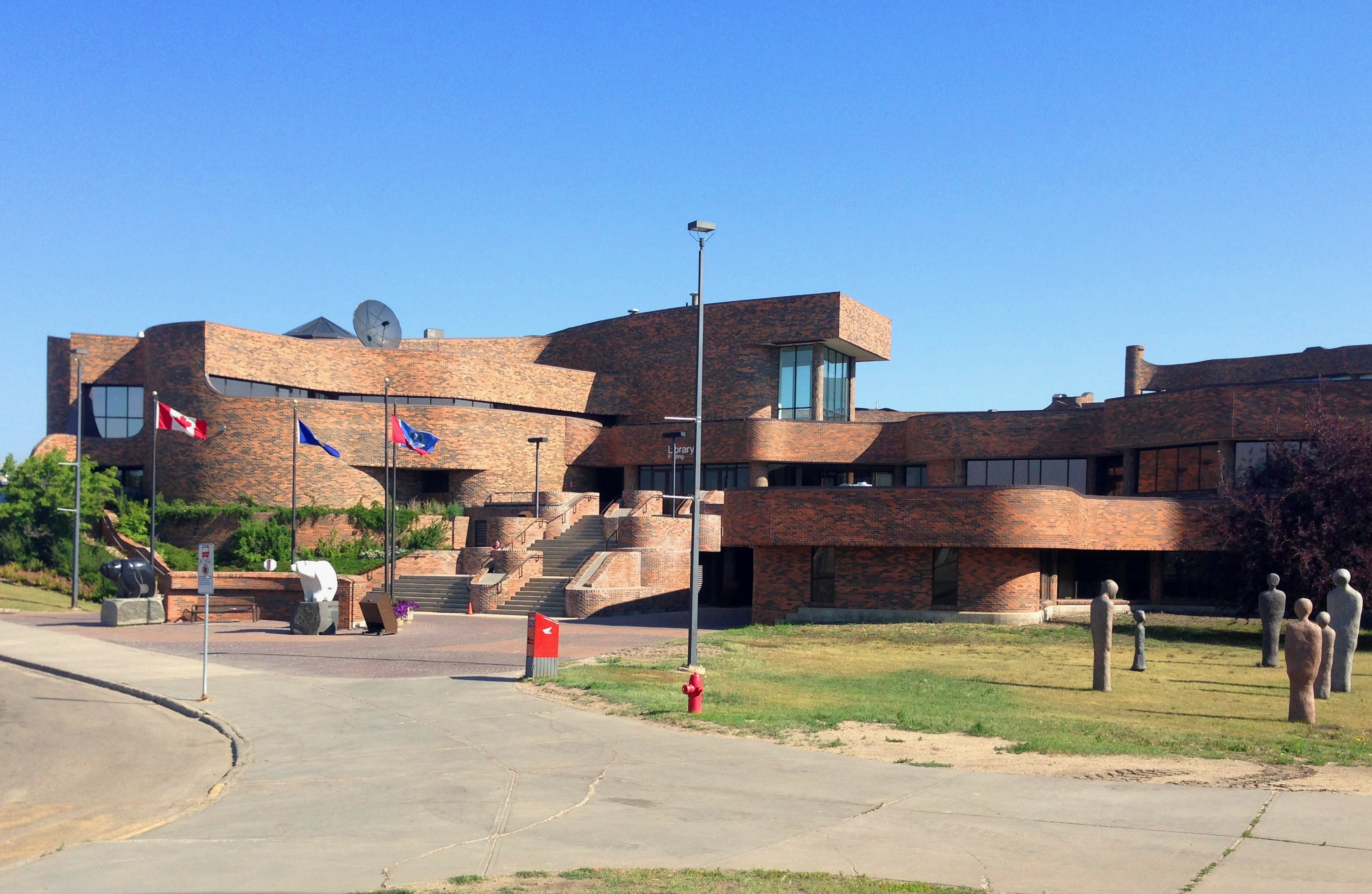
Grande Prairie campus main entry

As a polytechnic, NWP has expanded a variety of learning pathways. In Fall 2023, NWP began offering four-year bachelor's degrees in business administration and computing science. In Fall 2025, NWP began offering four-year bachelor's degrees in elementary education. In 2024, NWP was the recipient of funding to expand education for mental health professions in Alberta, and began offering a social work diplomas in 2025.

NWP is part of the Northern Alberta Medical Program (NAMP), a multi-site medical education program in partnership with the University of Alberta, which prepares graduates for family medicine and general practice.

In addition to local degrees, NWP also offers several collaborative degree completion opportunities, which allow students to complete two years as an NWP student before completing their qualification at a degree-granting university. As of 2026, transfer programs include two years toward a Bachelor of Arts, commerce, engineering, fine arts, kinesiology, and science.

NWP offers a range of two-year diploma programs, certificates and apprenticeship pathways. The institution has industry partnerships with global corporations like Caterpillar Inc. and Finning Canada, and hosts the only authorized Harley-Davidson® Training Centre in Canada.

Academic upgrading is also offered, which allows individuals to earn high school prerequisites needed for apprenticeship programs, and college-level or university courses, and/or a certificate of grade 12 Equivalency. The Polytechnic's continuing education department offers a variety of office, business, industry, safety, health, and human services certificate and micro-credential courses that range from one-day courses to full-credit programs.

== Athletics ==
Northwestern Polytechnic's athletics program is a member of the Alberta Colleges Athletics Conference and Canadian Collegiate Athletics Association. Student-athletes compete as the NWP Wolves, and as of 2026, athletes competed in eleven teams over seven sports, including cross-country running, basketball, indoor track, soccer, futsal, and volleyball, and golf. A women's hockey program will be added in the fall of 2026.

== Scholarships, awards, and bursaries ==
There are more than 300 scholarships, awards, and bursaries available to Northwestern Polytechnic students.

== Campus life ==
=== Grande Prairie facilities ===
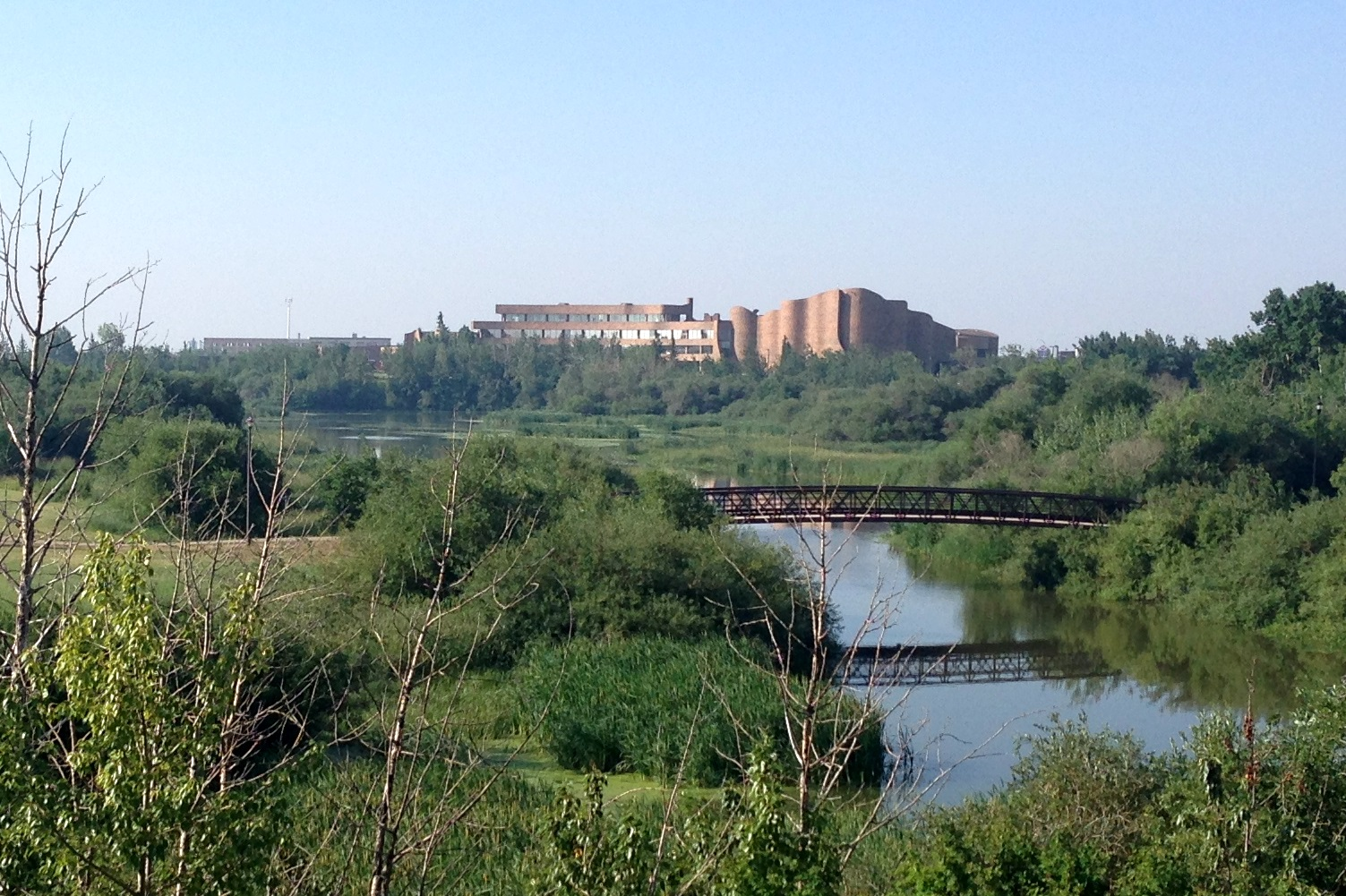
View of the Grande Prairie campus from across Muskoseepi Park

Located in the south of Alberta's Peace Country, and 450 km northwest of Edmonton, NWP's Grande Prairie campus includes a cafeteria, daycare, bookstore, theatres, a learning commons, and a health centre. On-campus housing is located near to the city's Muskoseepi Park trail system.

Northwestern Polytechnic's Grande Prairie campus includes the 500-seat Douglas J. Cardinal Centre for Performing Arts. The campus's student lounge, Howlers, also hosts weekend and evening entertainment often arranged by the NWP Students Association (NWPSA).

NWP's fitness facility at its Grande Prairie campus includes a weight room and a multipurpose fitness studio. A gymnasium, known as the "Wolf Den", is home to the NWP Wolves Athletic teams.

=== Fairview Campus facilities ===
Located 82 km from Peace River and 115 km from Grande Prairie, Northwestern Polytechnic's Fairview Campus houses a working farm for veterinary technology students, trades and technology labs, as well as a learning Commons. Northwestern Polytechnic's Fairview Campus also features a theatre and gymnasium with two volleyball courts and basketball courts.

As of October 6, 2021, NWP officially handed over operations of the Fairview Fitness Centre to the Town of Fairview with an arrangement that students, staff and community members would have ongoing access to the amenities and services.

The Fairview campus closed at the end of the 2025-26 academic year. It was reopened as a satellite campus of Northern Lakes College for the 2026-27 year.

== Residence ==
Northwestern Polytechnic has on-campus student residences in Fairview and Grande Prairie.

The Grande Prairie Campus Residence offers housing for over 500 students, with furnished accommodations for both single students and those with families. The Fairview Campus Housing and Residence offers dormitory, apartment, townhouse, and family living quarters.

== See also ==
- List of agricultural universities and colleges
- Education in Alberta
- List of universities and colleges in Alberta
