= Medicine Hat College =

College in Medicine Hat, Alberta

Coordinates: 50°1′3.38″N 110°41′3.39″W

- Motto: Scienta Mentem Sustinet (Latin: "Knowledge Sustains the Mind")
- Type: Public degree-granting community college
- Established: 1965
- Affiliations: CICan, CCAA, CCAA, AACTI, CBIE
- President: Kevin Shufflebotham
- Students: 2,119 (2023-24 fulltime equivalent)
- Location: Medicine Hat, Alberta, Canada
- Campus: Urban Medicine Hat Brooks
- Colours: gold ; black ; red
- Nickname: Rattlers
- Mascot: Rattlesnake
- Website: mhc.ab.ca

Medicine Hat College is a public, board governed, community college serving southeastern Alberta and southwestern Saskatchewan, Canada. The college is located in the city of Medicine Hat, Alberta, and was founded in 1965. Almost 2,500 students attend the main campus; another 200 attend Brooks Campus, located 100 km west of Medicine Hat in Brooks.

== Programs ==
More than 40 diplomas and certificates are offered along with 25 university transfer programs, and numerous apprenticeship trades. There are also several opportunities for degree completion at MHC. Students are able to complete a bachelor's degree in nursing, education, and business, thanks to collaborative agreements with the University of Calgary and Mount Royal University, respectively. Applied degrees are offered in Applied Arts (Visual Communications) and Applied Health Science (Paramedic). Graduates from diploma programs such as Criminal Justice may also complete degrees through Athabasca University. The college offers unique diploma programs such as Addictions Counseling.

== Services ==
Students are well served with services designed to support academic success. These include wellness, personal counseling, writing specialist, indigenous support specialist and more. The Entrepreneur Development Centre (EDC) specializes in helping students launch their own businesses.

== Library ==
Two libraries serve the college. The Vera Bracken Library is located in the B wing on the Medicine Hat Campus and was built in 2003. There is also a library at the Brooks Campus. The libraries have 100,000 print and non-print resources, 17,000 e-books, and over 20,000 online periodicals. The college is a member of The Alberta Library, the Southern Alberta Information Network, the Canadian Library Association, and the Library Association of Alberta.

== Athletics ==
The Medicine Hat College varsity athletic teams are known as the "Rattlers" and compete in the Alberta Colleges Athletic Conference. Sports include: basketball, volleyball, soccer, cross country, indoor track, women's ice hockey, futsal, and golf.

== See also ==
- Robert E. Sackley : a former president of Medicine Hat College
- Education in Alberta
- List of universities and colleges in Alberta
