= British Columbia Council on Admissions and Transfer =

The British Columbia Council on Admissions and Transfer (BCCAT) governs the credit-transfer agreements between post-secondary institutions in British Columbia, Canada.
