= Alberta private schools =

Educational institution in Alberta, Canada

Private schools are a type of K-12 educational institution in the Canadian province of Alberta, which are overseen and funded by the Government of Alberta. Tuition limits are not set by the government, and private schools do not receive funding for transportation or optional charges such as uniform and specialized curriculum activities.

In the 2023–24 school year, approximately 45,477 students attended a private school, or around 5.68 per cent of the total student population.

As of April 2024, there are 166 private school authorities in Alberta who operate a total of 222 schools.

== History ==
In 1946, the Social Credit Party government under the leadership of Ernest Manning recognized the creation of private schools with legislative changes to the provincial Education Act. Lobbied heavily by religious and conservative groups - primarily Dutch neo-Calvinists in the Christian Action Foundation, the Societies for Christian Education, and the Association of Private Schools and Colleges in Alberta (APSCA) - the Government of Alberta began providing public funding to private schools in 1967, starting at $100 per student. Further changes in 1974-76 under Peter Lougheed's Progressive Conservative government increased per-student funding to 33 per cent of what public schools received, then 40 per cent.

Following the election of Ralph Klein in 1992, a notable difference in messaging and justification for private school funding emerged which centred on "parent choice". Klein's government soon introduced charter schools legislation, and in April 1997 a private member bill sponsored by PC MLA Carol Louise Haley and supported by then-provincial treasurer Stockwell Day, seeking a $14 million increase to annual funding of private schools, was brought forward. Per-student funding was increased to 60 per cent of what public schools received by 1998, while the public school system saw wages cut for teachers, funding cuts, repealed education regulations, the centralization of school boards, and the elimination of taxation powers for schools to raise revenue on their own.

This situation was detested by workers in the education system and the public in general and pressure built gradually in the following years, eventually culminating in the 2002 Alberta teachers' strike. At its peak, 22,000 teachers out of a total 32,000 were on strike by February, affecting around 357,000 students out of a total 550,000.

Following unsuccessful back to work orders in February, Minister of Learning and Education Lyle Oberg declared a public emergency. The Klein government in collusion with the Alberta School Boards' Association agreed to pass Bill 12, the Education Services Settlement Act (ESSA) on March 14, 2002, in response to the strike, which was widely seen as a betrayal to teachers and an illegal and draconian piece of legislation. The ESSA imposed a wage settlement arbitration process on teachers and made it nearly impossible to appeal this process or its results in court; gave the government permission to remove the right to strike or lockout; forbade teachers from engaging in slowdowns or diminishing their job duties; broadened the term 'strike' to include two or more teachers acting together to refuse to perform assigned responsibilities; and established severe penalties for any non-compliance. Larry Booi, the Alberta Teachers' Association (ATA) President, responded to the legislation by stating "This is a black day for public education and for democracy in Alberta. This government has made a terrible decision, and we all shall have to live with the consequences".

Though the strike ended, the private school system has grown in size and in funding under Progressive Conservative governments, which formed the provincial government continuously between 1971 and 2015. At the initiative of Ed Stelmach's government in 2008, per-student funding rose to 70 per cent of that received by public schools (equivalent to around $5,200 per student), and remains at this rate today.

== Private schools and private school authorities in Alberta ==
These are classified by the Government into 3 different types and 2 special designations:

- Registered private schools: registered under Section 29(1) of the Education Act; must meet requirements outlined by the Act and in sections (2), (3), (4), (5), and (21) in the Private Schools Regulation. They are ineligible for government funding and although not required to use certificated teachers or teach the Alberta curriculum, are required to maintain a list of subjects, skills, and knowledge areas.
- Accredited private schools (non funded): registered under Section 29(2) of the Education Act; must meet the requirements of a registered private school and the additional Private Schools Regulation requirements under sections (6), (8), (9), and (10). They must use certificated teachers, but are not required to teach the Alberta curriculum.
- Accredited funded private schools: funded by the government through the Education Grants Regulation; must meet additional Private Schools Regulation requirements under sections (7), (12), (13), (14), (15), (16), (17), (18), (19), and (20). They are required to use certificated teachers, must teach the Alberta curriculum, and must have a principal who is also a certificated teacher.
- Designated special education private schools: funded by the government; given special approval and funding by the Minister of Education for the purpose of serving students identifying with mild, moderate, or severe disabilities, and must meet the additional requirements under section (11) of the Private Schools Regulation.
- Heritage language schools: offers approved language and culture courses outside of regular school hours to students who already have basic education needs met at another school authority; if funding is granted, a principal must be a certificated teacher and audited financial statements are required.

As of April 2024, there are 166 private school authorities operating 222 schools in Alberta:

Authority	School	City	Grades Taught	Additional Details
1620215 Alberta Ltd.	Cochrane Valley Montessori School	Cochrane	K	
1620215 Alberta Ltd.	Cochrane Valley Montessori School	Cochrane	1-6	
40-Mile Christian Education Society	Cherry Coulee Christian Academy	Bow Island	K-12	
Access International College (Calgary) Inc.	Access Academy	Calgary	7-12	
Ahmadiyya Muslim Schools Society Alberta	Ahmadiyya Muslim School	Calgary	K-9	
Airdrie Christian Academy Society	Airdrie Christian Academy	Airdrie	K-12	
Al Mustafa Academy & Humanitarian Society	Al-Mustafa Academy	Edmonton	K-12	
Al Mustafa Academy & Humanitarian Society	Al-Mustafa North Location	Edmonton	K-9	
Al-Zahra Islamic Research Foundation	Al-Qaim International School	Calgary	K-9	
AlBaqir Academy Association	AlBaqir Academy	Edmonton	K-12	
Alberta Chinese Cultural Education Society	Alberta Heritage Language	Edmonton	10-12	
Alberta Chung Wah School Society	Alberta Chung Wah School	Calgary	10-12	
Alberta Conference of 7th Day Adventist Church	Chinook Winds Adventist Academy	Calgary	K-12	
Alberta Conference of 7th Day Adventist Church	College Heights Christian School	Lacombe	K-12	
Alberta Conference of 7th Day Adventist Church	Higher Ground Christian School	Medicine Hat	K-9	
Alberta Conference of 7th Day Adventist Church	Mamawi Atosketan Native School	Ponoka	K-12	
Alberta Conference of 7th Day Adventist Church	Peace Hills Adventist School	Wetaskiwin	K-9	
Alberta Conference of 7th Day Adventist Church	Prairie Adventist Christian eSchool	Lacombe	K-12	
Alberta Conference of 7th Day Adventist Church	South Side Christian School	Medicine Hat	K-9	
Alberta Conference of 7th Day Adventist Church	Sylvan Meadow Adventist School	Red Deer County	K-9	
Alberta Conference of 7th Day Adventist Church	Woodlands Adventist School	Ponoka	K-9	
Alberta Interscience Association	Russian Education Centre	Edmonton	10-12	
Arise Calgary Church	Arise Christian Academy	Calgary	1-12	
Asasa Learning	Asasa Academy	Calgary	K-6	
Asasa Learning	Little Angels	Calgary	K	
Atlas Learning Academy Ltd.	Atlas Learning Academy Ltd.	Airdrie	K-9	
Aurora Learning Foundation	Aurora Learning Foundation	Sherwood Park	1-12	
Aurora Learning Foundation (Calgary)	Aurora Learning Calgary	Calgary	1-12	
Banbury Crossroads School	Banbury Crossroads School	Calgary	K-12	
Bearspaw Christian School Society	BCS@Home	Calgary	K-12	
Bow Island Congregation, Church of God in Christ, Mennonite	Sun Country Christian School	Calgary	n/a	
Buffalo Head Mennonite School Society	Neuanlage School	Buffalo Head Prairie	n/a	
Buffalo Head Mennonite School Society	Ostland School	Buffalo Head Prairie	n/a	
Buffalo Head Mennonite School Society	Rosenfeld School	Buffalo Head Prairie	n/a	
Buffalo Head Mennonite School Society	Vastland School	Buffalo Head Prairie	n/a	
Calgary Academy Society	Calgary Academy Collegiate	Calgary	K-12	
Calgary Changemakers in Education Society	Calgary Changemakers School	Calgary	K-9	
Calgary Chinese Alliance School Society	Calgary Chinese Alliance School	Calgary	10-12	
Calgary French & International School Society	Calgary French & International School	Calgary	K-12	
Calgary German Language School Society	Calgary German Language School Society	Calgary	7-12	
Calgary International Academy Ltd.	Calgary International Academy	Calgary	1-6	
Calgary International Academy Ltd.	Calgary International Academy ECS	Calgary	K	
Calgary Mandarin School Association	Calgary Mandarin School	Calgary	10-12	
Calgary Quest Children's Society	Calgary Quest School	Calgary	1-12	
Calgary Waldorf School Society	Calgary Waldorf School	Calgary	K-9	
Calvin Christian School Society of the Netherlands Reformed Congregations	Calvin Christian School	Coalhurst	K-12	
Canadian Collegiate Institute	Canadian Collegiate Institute	Edmonton	n/a	
Canadian Polish Language and Culture Parent Association	Polish Sienkiewicz School	Edmonton	10-12	
Canadian Reformed School Society of Edmonton	Parkland Immanuel Christian School	Edmonton	K-12	
Canadian Reformed School Society of Neerlandia	Covenant Canadian Reformed School	County of Barrhead No. 11	K-12	
Capstone Engineering Academy	Capstone Engineering Academy	Calgary	1-12	
Central Alberta Christian High School Society	Central Alberta Christian High School	Lacombe	10-12	
Centro Linguistico E Culturale Italiano Calgary	Italian School of Calgary	Calgary	7-12	
Chinese Cultural Promotion Society (CCPS)	The Chinese Cultural Promotion Society	Edmonton	10-12	
Chiniki Community College	Chiniki Community College	Mînî Thnî	10-12	
Church of God in Christ Mennonite	Hilltop Christian School	Fort Vermilion	1-9	
Church of God in Christ Mennonite Pembina Valley Congregation	Pembina Valley Christian School	Westlock	1-9	
Church of God in Christ Mennonite Rosedale Congregation	Rosedale Christian School	Crooked Creek	n/a	
Clear Water Academy Foundation	Clear Water Academy	Calgary	K-12	
Cleardale Mennonite School Society	Cleardale Mennonite School	Cleardale	1-9	
Cleardale Mennonite School Society	Worsely Mennonite School	Cleardale	1-6	
Coaldale Canadian Reformed School Society	Coaldale Christian School	Coaldale	K-12	
Columbia College Calgary	Columbia College	Calgary	10-12	
Congregation House of Jacob-Mikveh Israel	Akiva Academy	Calgary	K-9	
Countryside Christian School	Countryside Christian School	Edberg	K-9	
Creekside Creative Academy	Creekside Creative Academy	Red Deer	K-9	
Delta West Academy Society	Delta West Academy	Calgary	K-12	
Destiny Christian School Society	Destiny Christian School Society	Red Deer County	K-9	
Devon Christian School Society	Devon Christian School	Devon	K-9	
Duchess Bethel Mennonite School	Duchess Bethel Mennonite School	Duchess	n/a	
E2 Society for Twice-Exceptional Learners	E2 Academy	Edmonton	K-12	
Eastside City Church and Missionary Society	Eastside Christian Academy	Calgary	K-12	
Echo Valley Church of God in Christ Mennonite	Echo Valley Christian School	Bluffton	n/a	
Edison School Society	Edison School	Foothills	K-12	
Edmonton Academy Society for Learning Disabled	Edmonton Academy	Edmonton	1-12	
Edmonton Bible Heritage Christian School & College Society	Edmonton Bible Heritage Christian School	Edmonton	n/a	
Edmonton Islamic School Society	Edmonton Islamic Academy	Edmonton	K-12	
Edmonton Khalsa School Educational Association	Edmonton Khalsa School	Edmonton	K-6	
Education Unlimited Network	Education Unlimited Academy	Kingman	K-12	
Elves Special Needs Society	Elves Adult & Youth Centre	Edmonton	K-12	
Elves Special Needs Society	Elves Child Development Centre	Edmonton	K	
First Steps Elementary Academy	First Steps Elementary Academy	Red Deer	K-6	
Foothills Academy Society	Foothills Academy	Calgary	1-12	
Footprints for Learning Society	Footprints for Learning Society	Airdrie	K-12	
Footprints for Learning Society	Footprints for Learning Academy (West Side Campus)	Airdrie	n/a	
Fort McMurray Montessori Foundation	Hillcrest Montessori Academy	Fort McMurray	K-6	
GCA Education Society	Glenmore Christian Academy Junior High	Calgary	1-9	
Genesis Protestant Reformed School Society of Lacombe	Genesis Protestant Reformed School	Clive	n/a	
German Language School Society of Edmonton	German Language School Society of Edmonton	Devon	n/a	
Gil Vicente Edmonton Portuguese School Society	Gil Vicente School	Edmonton	n/a	
Gobind Marg Charitable Trust Association	Gobind Sarvar School	Edmonton	K-6	
Gobind Marg Charitable Trust Foundation	Gobind Sarvar School Guru Nanak Gate Campus	Calgary	1-12	
Gobind Marg Charitable Trust Foundation	Gobind Sarvar School	Calgary	K-6	
Greek Orthodox Community of Edmonton and District Society	St. George's Hellenic Language School	Edmonton	n/a	
Headway School Society of Alberta	Headway School Society of Alberta	Edmonton	K-12	
Hellenic Academia Institute	Hellenic Academia Institute	Edmonton	n/a	
Hellenic Society of Calgary and District	Greek Community School	Calgary	10-12	
Hellenic-Canadian Community of Edmonton and Region	Hellenic-Canadian Community of Edmonton and Region	Edmonton	n/a	
High Level Christian Education Society	High Level Christian Academy	High Level	K-9	
Hillcrest Christian School Society	Hillcrest Christian School	Grande Prairie	K-12	
Horizon Academy Institute	Horizon Heritage Arabic School	Calgary	10-12	
Ignite Alberta Institute for Learning	Ignite Centre for eLearning	Edmonton	K-12	
Independent Baptist Christian Education Society	Harvest Baptist Academy	Spruce Grove	K-12	
Independent School Authority Ltd.	Summit West Independent School	Okotoks	K-12	
Inner City Youth Development Association	Inner City High School	Edmonton	10-12	
Janus Academy Society	Janus Academy	Calgary	1-9	
Janus Academy Society	Janus Academy Junior/Senior High School	Calgary	1-12	
Khalsa School Calgary Educational Foundation	Khalsa School Calgary Educational Foundation	Conrich	K-9	
Kneehill Christian School	Kneehill Christian School	Linden	1-9	
Koinonia Christian School - Red Deer Society	Emmaus Learning Community - DSEPS	Red Deer	1-12	
Koinonia Christian School - Red Deer Society	Koinonia Christian School (Red Deer)	Red Deer	K-12	
Koinonia Christian School - Red Deer Society	Koinonia @ Home	Red Deer	K-12	
Lady Fatima Academy	Lady Fatima Academy	Calgary	K-6	
Lakeland Christian School Society	Lakeland Christian Academy	Cold Lake	K-12	
Lakeland Christian School Society	Peace Christian Academy	Grimshaw	K-12	
Lakeland Church of God in Christ (Mennonite) of Dewberry	Lakeland Country School	Dewberry	n/a	
Lakeview Christian School	Lakeview Christian School	Stettler	1-9	
Legacies Academy Foundation	Legacies Academy	High River	K-6	
Lighthouse Christian School Society	Lighthouse Christian School	Sylvan Lake	K-12	
Living Springs Mennonite Church of Hythe	Living Springs Christian School	Hythe	n/a	
Living Truth Christian School Society	Living Truth Christian School	Mirror	K-12	
Living Waters Christian Academy	Living Waters Christian Academy	Spruce Grove	K-12	
Lycee Louis Pasteur Society	Lycee Louis Pasteur	Calgary	K-12	
Maria Montessori Education Centre of Calgary, Ltd.	Maria Montessori School	Calgary	K-9	
Maria Montessori Education Centre of Calgary, Ltd.	Maria Montessori School - cSPACE King Edward Location	Calgary	K	
Maskwachees Cultural College Foundation	Maskwachees Cultural School	Maskwacis	10-12	
Meadows Christian Education Society	Meadows Christian Academy	Edmonton	K-9	
Montessori School of Calgary	Montessori School of Calgary	Calgary	K-6	
Mountain View Academy Society	Mountain View Academy	Calgary	K-12	
Muslim Association of Canada	MAC Islamic School	Edmonton	K-12	
Muslim Association of Canada	MAC Islamic School - Calgary Chapter	Calgary	K-9	
Muslim Association of Canada	MAC Islamic School Southside Campus	n/a	n/a	
Nebula Foundation	Nebula Academy	Edmonton	K-9	
Neriah Christian School Society of the Netherlands Reformed Congregation	Neriah Christian School	Calgary	1-9	
New Heights School and Learning Services Society	New Heights School and Learning Services	Calgary	K-12	
Newell Christian School Society	Newell Christian School	Brooks	K-9	
North Point School for Boys	North Point School	Calgary	1-12	
North Point School for Boys	North Point School for Boys	Calgary	K-9	
North Point School for Boys	North Point School - DSEPS	Calgary	1-12	
Northern Lights School Education Foundation	Northern Lights School	Spirit River	1-9	
Olds Mountain View Christian School Association	Olds Mountain View Christian School	Olds	K-12	
Parkland Community Living and Supports Society	Parkland School Special Education	Red Deer	1-12	
Peace Mennonite School	Peace Mennonite School	La Crete	n/a	
Philippine Cultural Center Foundation (Calgary)	Filipino Language and Cultural School of Calgary	Calgary	n/a	
Phoenix Education Foundation	Phoenix Education Foundation	Calgary	K-12	
Pincher Creek Meadow Valley Ministry	Meadow Valley Christian Academy	Pincher Creek	n/a	
Ponoka Christian School Society	Ponoka Christian School	Ponoka	K-9	
Progressive Academy Education Society	Progressive Academy	Edmonton	K-12	
Providence Christian School Society	Providence Christian School	Monarch	K-12	
Red Crow Community College	Red Crow Community College	Cardston	10-12	
Renfrew Educational Services Society	Renfrew Educational Services - Bowness Centre	Calgary	K	
Renfrew Educational Services Society	Renfrew Educational Services - Child Development Centre	Calgary	K	
Renfrew Educational Services Society	Renfrew Educational Services - Janice McTighe Centre	Calgary	K-9	
Renfrew Educational Services Society	Renfrew Educational Services - Park Place Centre	Calgary	n/a	
Renfrew Educational Services Society	Renfrew Thomas W. Buchanan Centre	Calgary	K-9	
River Valley School Society	River Valley School ECS	Calgary	K	
Rocky View Mennonite Church	Rockyview Christian School	Pincher Creek	n/a	
RTD Math Academy Ltd.	RTD Math Academy	Red Deer	7-12	
Rundle College Society	Rundle Studio	Calgary	7-12	
Saddle Lake Indian Full Gospel School Mission	Sawenegezhik Academy	Saddle Lake	n/a	
SCcyber E-Learning Community	SCcyber E-Learning Community	Calgary	10-12	
SCcyber E-Learning Community	SCcyber E-Learning Institute	Calgary	10-12	
School of East Indian Languages and Performing Arts of Calgary	School of East Indian Languages and Performing Arts	Calgary	n/a	
Slave Lake Koinonia Christian School Society	Slave Lake Christian Academy	Slave Lake	K-9	
Solomon College	Solomon College	Edmonton	10-12	
Sreekumar Education Foundation	Canadian International Private School	Edmonton	n/a	
St. Matthew Evangelical Lutheran Church of Stony Plain, Alberta	St. Matthew Lutheran Christian Academy	Stony Plain	K-9	
Stirling Mennonite Church Day School	Stirling Mennonite Day School	Raymond	n/a	
Strathcona-Tweedsmuir School	Strathcona-Tweedsmuir Online	Okotoks	7-12	
Strathcona-Tweedsmuir School	Strathcona-Tweedsmuir School	Okotoks	K-12	
Swedish Society of Calgary	Swedish Language School	Calgary	7-9	
Tanbridge Academy	Tanbridge Academy	Calgary	K-9	
Tempo School	Tempo School	Edmonton	K-12	
The Alberta Ballet Company	Alberta Ballet School	Calgary	7-12	
The Calgary Chinese Public School Society	Calgary Chinese Private School	Calgary	10-12	
The Calgary Jewish Academy	Calgary Jewish Academy	Calgary	K-9	
The Canadian Montessori School Ltd.	Canadian Montessori School	Calgary	K-6	
The Canadian Montessori School Ltd.	Canadian Montessori School North	Calgary	K	
The Canadian Montessori School Ltd.	Canadian Montessori School West	Calgary	K	
The Canadian Reformed School Society of Calgary	Tyndale Christian School	Calgary	K-12	
The Chinese Academy Foundation	The Chinese Academy	Calgary	10-12	
The Cornerstone Christian Academy of Camrose	Cornerstone Christian Academy	Kingman	K-12	
The Dante Alighieri Society	Dante Alighieri Italian School	Edmonton	n/a	
The Edge School for Athletes Society	Edge School	Calgary	1-12	
The Father's House Christian Fellowship - Sturgeon County	The Father's House Christian School	Morinville	K-12	
The Filipino Canadian Saranay Association of Alberta	Filipino Language & Cultural School	Edmonton	K-12	
The Gilbertine Institute of Catholic Studies	Holy House of Our Lady and St. Benedict	Edmonton	1-9	
The Gilbertine Institute of Catholic Studies	The Gilbertine Academy	Calgary	K-12	
The Gilbertine Institute of Catholic Studies	Villa Spiritus	Derwent	10-12	
The Heart Valley Church of God in Christ Mennonite	Heart Valley Christian School	Wanham	n/a	
The Lacombe Christian School Society	Lacombe Christian School	Lacombe	K-9	
The Old Sun Society	Old Sun Community College	Siksika 146	10-12	
The Renert School Foundation	Renert School	Calgary	K-12	
The Rimbey Christian School Society	Rimbey Christian School	Rimbey	K-9	
The Society of Ukrainian Studies of Alberta	Ivan Franko Ukrainian School	Edmonton	7-12	
Third Academy International Ltd.	LYNX East	Bragg Creek	K-9	
Third Academy International Ltd.	LYNX West	Calgary	K-9	
Third Academy International Ltd.	The Third Academy	Rocky View County	1-6	
Third Academy International Ltd.	Third Academy Calgary South	Rocky View County	7-12	
Third Academy International Ltd.	URSA	Calgary	K-12	
Tween Valley Fellowship/Tween Valley Christian School	Tween Valley Christian School	Taber	K-12	
Unlimited Potential Community Services Society	Bright Bank Academy	Edmonton	1-9	
Unlimited Potential Community Services Society	Columbus Academy	Edmonton	1-12	
Unlimited Potential Community Services Society	Phoenix Academy	Edmonton	7-12	
Unlimited Potential Community Services Society	Thomas More Academy	Edmonton	1-12	
Waldorf Education Society of Edmonton	Waldorf Independent School of Edmonton	Edmonton	K-9	
Webber Academy Foundation	Webber Academy	Calgary	K-12	
West Island College Society of Alberta	West Island College	Calgary	7-12	
Wilson Prairie Mennonite School Society	Blumenort Mennonite School	La Crete	n/a	
Wilson Prairie Mennonite School Society	Tompkins Mennonite School	La Crete	n/a	
Wilson Prairie Mennonite School Society	Wilson Prairie Mennonite School	La Crete	n/a	
Yellowhead Koinonia Christian School Society	Yellowhead Koinonia Christian School	Edson	K-12	
Yufeng Chinese School Centre	Yufeng Chinese School	Calgary	1-12	
