= Sharon Carry =

Canadian education administrator

- Born: March 31, 1950 (age 76); Calgary, Alberta, Canada
- Occupation: Higher education administrator
- Years active: 1972-2016

Sharon Dawn Carry (born March 31, 1950) is a Canadian education administrator. She was president and chief executive operator at Bow Valley College from 1997 until 2016.

== Early life and education ==
Carry was born on March 31, 1950, in Calgary, Alberta. She completed her Bachelor of Arts, Bachelor of Education (with distinction), and Masters of Communication Studies.

== Career ==
After working for the University of Calgary while a student, Carry began her career at Mount Royal College in 1972. Between 1983 and 1997, Carry held positions at Olds College, including registrar, dean, and vice president of student and support services. From 1997 to 2016, Carry served as president and chief executive officer of Bow Valley College from 1997 through the end of 2016, where she led the school through a transition from provincial administration to a public governance model. Her administration doubled enrollment and expanded programs and facilities.

Carry was also the owner of a marketing and communications business and consulted for private and public sector organizations. She has served on the boards of Council of Post-Secondary Presidents of Alberta, the Calgary Homelessness Foundation, the Calgary Community Land Trust, the Credit Union Deposit Guarantee Corporation, . She is currently a director of the International Women's Forum, YW Calgary, the Alberta Order of Excellence Council, and ABC Benefits Corporation Foundation.

- Alberta Order of Excellence (2014)
- Distinguished Service Award from the Association of Canadian Community Colleges (2013)
- Queen Elizabeth II Diamond Jubilee Medal (2012)
- City of Calgary's Award for Education (2010)
- Alberta Centennial Medal (2005)

She has honorary degrees from Olds College and Southern Alberta Institute of Technology and she also received the first honorary Masters of Fine Arts from Alberta College of Art and Design (now known as Alberta University of the Arts).

In 2015, Carry was given the honorary title and a Blackfoot name, Niipaitapi [nee-bah-tah-pee] Askinimatstohki [es-ksee-nee-maht-stooh-kee], which translates to Lifelong Educator.
