= Keyano College =

Postsecondary institution in Alberta, Canada

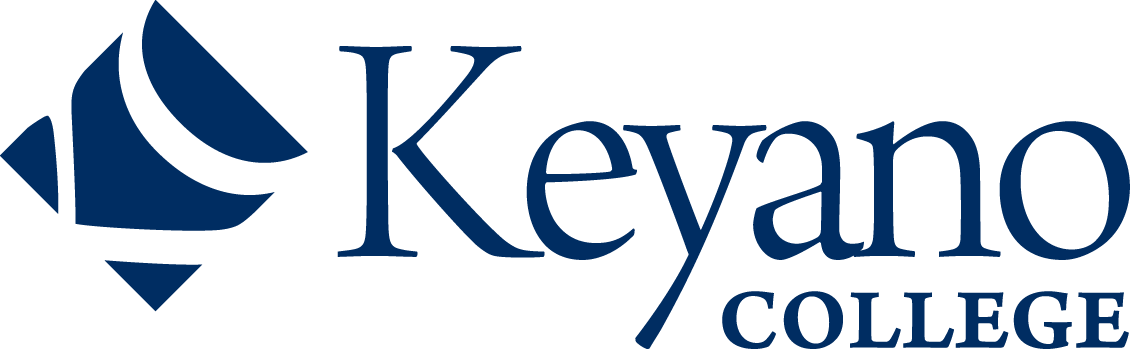
- Former name: Alberta Vocational Centre
- Motto: Yours, Mine, Ours
- Type: Public
- Established: 1965
- Academic affiliations: AACTI; CICan; CCAA; ACAC
- President: Scott MacPherson
- Faculty: 260
- Students: 2,164 (2023-24 fulltime equivalent)
- Location: 8115 Franklin Avenue, Fort McMurray, Alberta, Canada; 56.7145°N 111.3477°W
- Campus: Urban/suburban
- Campuses: Anzac; Fort Chipewyan; Fort McMurray; Fort McKay
- Colours: Blue & white
- Nickname: Huskies
- Mascot: King
- Website: www.keyano.ca/en/index.aspx

Keyano College is a post-secondary college located in Fort McMurray, Alberta, Canada. It offers specialized training to more than 2,100 full-time students and over 4,000 part-time students. The main Clearwater Campus is located in downtown Fort McMurray with the Suncor Energy Industrial Campus located in the Gregoire Industrial Park and a new campus in Fort Chipewyan. Outreach campuses are located in Anzac, and Fort McKay. The college is also a member of the Alberta Rural Development Network.

== History ==
Keyano College opened in Fort McMurray in 1965 as the Alberta Vocational Centre (AVC). The official opening ceremonies were held on January 26, 1966. In 1975 the college was reopened under its current name, "Keyano", which is a Cree word which, roughly translated, means, "Sharing". The college's slogan was further adapted from that to be "Yours, Mine and Ours".

In 1978 Keyano College went public and became a community college when the province appointed a Board of Governors to serve as the decision-making body for the institution.

In 2013 and 2018, the Auditor General of Alberta recommended the college implement information technology systems to meet legislative compliance. In 2020, the college network was infected with malware after installing SolarWinds. 19 staff were laid off later that year. In 2022, the college was a victim of a data breach.

In 2021 the college launched an eSports Management program, and later invested nearly $1 million in a new eSports arena.

In 2024, police were called to the campus for two student protests. The students, who were protesting failing grades, were mainly in the early childhood education program, with one of the cheapest tuitions. Some students insisted they were entitled to a passing grade by paying tuition. President Jay Notay indicated that granting those students requests would be "compromising our academic integrity".

== Programs offered ==
Students can choose from certificate and diploma programs in a wide variety of areas, such as aboriginal entrepreneurship, business administration, college & career preparation, childhood studies, Bachelor of Education, EMT, environmental technology, office administration, practical nurse, human resources management, social work, and university studies.

A number of trades programs are also offered, such as heavy equipment technician and power and process engineering. There are one- and two-year university transfer programs in a variety of disciplines with collaborative degrees in nursing and elementary education. Apprenticeship programs are also offered in electrician, heavy equipment technician, millwright, steamfitter/pipefitter, and welding. To make entering the workforce an easier process, Keyano offers pre-employment programs as an alternative to traditional apprenticeship training. First-rate technology is also used, including a new oilsands power & process engineering laboratory. This facility was funded in part by industry leaders.

Keyano also has an active Language Instruction for Newcomers to Canada (LINC) Program, which is funded by Immigration, Refugees, and Citizenship Canada, and that offers English language instruction to newcomers to Canada.

== Scholarships and bursaries ==
Each Fall, Keyano hosts a Student Awards ceremony where sponsors give out their awards to deserving students. In 2024-2025, Keyano awarded over $715,000.

== Student life ==
Keyano's own theatre offers concerts (like Jann Arden, George Canyon, and Ron James) and plays (Calendar Girls, Mamma Mia!) as well as lectures and guest speakers. In 2013, the Keyano Gala hosted speakers Melissa Blake, mayor of Wood Buffalo, CTV journalist Seamus O’Regan and Alan Doyle of Great Big Sea.

== Athletics ==
Sports teams include: basketball, volleyball, soccer, cheer, cricket and futsal.

== See also ==
- Education in Alberta
