= Education in Alberta =

Education in the Province of Alberta
Alberta Education
- Minister of Education: Demetrios Nicolaides

National education budget
- Budget: $9.8 billion

General details
- Primary languages: English and French
- System type: Provincial, public and private

Education in Alberta is provided mainly through funding from the provincial government. The earliest form of formal education in Alberta is usually preschool which is not mandatory and is then followed by the partially-mandatory kindergarten to Grade 12. This is managed by Alberta Education (also known as the Ministry of Education) which has divided the province into 379 school authorities. Higher education in the province is managed by Alberta Advanced Education.

Alberta has a highly-developed education system and is known for having one of the most academically successful education systems in Canada, and the world. It has also historically performed well on international ranking tests and diploma examinations.

== History ==
The first schools in what is now Alberta were parochial, that is, they were organized, owned and operated by Church clergy, missionaries, or authorities, both Roman Catholic and Protestant. A nominal fee was often charged for the attendance of students at these schools, and the fee was more often waived, as an act of charity or as an act of proselytizing, or as an act of local solidarity.

The first "free" school (which would now be called a public school) in what is now Alberta, was established in the Hamlet of Edmonton, in what was then Northwest Territories, in early 1881. The school was established before the Northwest Territories had a Territorial Assembly, and before there was any law for the Territory respecting schools, or local government, or local taxation. The people of the Hamlet of Edmonton elected trustees to govern the establishment and operation of the school, and submitted to an informal local taxation entirely on the basis of local solidarity.

Between 1883 and 1905 a system of education developed in Alberta by which public education was available in every community once the local population initiated its introduction; and separate school education could be provided subsequently, provided certain conditions were met. This system, by which public education was to be universally available and separate school education available under certain conditions, was the system which the federal government of Sir Wilfrid Laurier enshrined in the constitution of Alberta (the Alberta Act) in 1905.

The most recent significant development in the governance of education in Alberta has been the emergence of Francophone education authorities in response to the adoption of the Canadian Charter of Rights and Freedoms (1982). There are now five Francophone authorities in Alberta. In the south a public Francophone authority and a separate Francophone authority share coterminous boundaries. In the north there are three authorities which provide both public and separate school education. The Francophone authorities, together, cover the province, but they are not required to provide Francophone education from place to place, except where numbers warrant, and it is the responsibility of the authority to decide whether numbers warrant.

== Educational stages ==
There are often multiple terms for each level.

- Early childhood education
  - Pre-school
- Elementary education
  - Kindergarten (ages 5–6)
  - Grade 1 (ages 6–7)
  - Grade 2 (ages 7–8)
  - Grade 3 (ages 8–9)
  - Grade 4 (ages 9–10)
  - Grade 5 (ages 10–11)
  - Grade 6 (ages 11–12)
- Junior high/middle school
  - Grade 7 (ages 12–13)
  - Grade 8 (ages 13–14)
  - Grade 9 (ages 14–15)
- High school/senior high
  - Grade 10 (ages 15–16)
  - Grade 11 (ages 16–17)
  - Grade 12 (ages 17–18)
- Higher/post-secondary education
  - College: The term college usually refers to a community college or a technical, applied arts, or applied science school. These are post-secondary institutions granting certificates, diplomas, associates degree, and bachelor's degrees.
  - University: A university is an institution of higher education and research, which grants academic degrees in a variety of subjects. A university is a corporation that provides both undergraduate education and postgraduate education.
  - Graduate school: A graduate school is a school that awards advanced academic certificates, diplomas and degrees (i.e. master's degree, Ph.D.)

== Legislation ==
The School Act is a provincial statue governing primary education and secondary education within Alberta. The Act authorizes the creation of and regulates public, separate, and Francophone school authorities and that Alberta Education will oversee the school authorities. Responsibility for oversight of the administration of individual schools lies with the district school authority. The ministry has the ability to dissolve school authorities, which has only happened twice in provincial history, as recently as 1999. One of the trustees who was a member of the 1999 dissolution was notable Alberta politician Danielle Smith, whom as of 2012 is the Leader of the Official Opposition.

The Education Act received royal assent in 2012. When the NDP took power however their government decided that it would review this Act which had been passed under the previous Conservative government and that the school act would remain in place for the 2016/2017 school year.

The Post-Secondary Learning Act is a provincial statue governing post-secondary education within Alberta. Government oversight for post-secondary education across the province lies with Alberta Advanced Education. This ministry provides funding to Alberta universities, colleges and other post-secondary institutions.

== K–12 ==
In Canada the province with the best educational record – indeed the jurisdiction in the English-speaking world with the best state school performance – is Alberta.

— Michael Gove, UK Secretary for Education,

The ministry responsible for kindergarten to grade 12 (also known as primary and secondary education) is Alberta Education. The ministry has divided the province into 379 school authorities. The authorities are both public, private, charter, and separate. All school authorities are required to employ teachers who are certificated by Alberta Education under the Executive Director of Teaching & Leadership Excellence. The Ministry is also responsible for setting curriculum, or as it is officially referred to, programs of study.

There were 690,844 students in K–12 enrolled in Alberta as of the 2014/2015 school year.

In accordance with the School Act children are required to attend school from age 6 to 16, roughly kindergarten to Grade 11.

=== Funding ===
For many years the provincial government has provided the greater part of the cost of providing K–12 education. Prior to 1994 public and separate school authorities in Alberta had the legislative authority to levy a local tax on property, as supplementary support for local education. In 1994 the government of the province eliminated this right for public school authorities, but not for separate school authorities. Since 1994 there has continued to be a tax on property in support of K–12 education; the difference is that the mill rate is now set by the provincial government, the money is collected by the local municipal authority and remitted to the provincial government. The relevant legislation requires that all the money raised by this property tax must go to the support of K–12 education provided by school authorities. The provincial government pools the property tax funds from across the province and distributes them, according to a formula, to public and separate school jurisdictions and Francophone authorities.

In addition to the property tax collected, the provincial government allocates money each year from the General Revenue Fund, for the support of K–12 public and separate school education. In the case of the money drawn from the General Revenue Fund, it is also used to provide full financial support for charter schools, a type of privately-operated but publicly-funded school that does not charge tuition (and receives the same funding per student that a public district school would receive). Private schools and homeschooling receive some funding, but parents will pay a substantial portion of the cost.

Since 1994 all school authorities with a civil electorate (public, separate, Francophone) are funded almost entirely by the provincial government. School authorities may, and many do, allow the school administration to levy fees for art supplies, textbook rentals, and transportation. There is, however, an appeals process which families can undertake who cannot afford the fees.

=== Organization ===
The school authorities are governed by trustees who are elected by the electorate of the authority. The school authorities may then appoint a superintendent who will then manage day-to-day operations of the authority while the board focuses on the organization of the system. In some cases where private schools are their essentially their own school authority they do not appoint a superintendent. Schools then operate under the management of the school authority.

Students in Alberta have their courses mandated but normally after each section of schooling they are given more freedom in what they can choose to take. Then starting in high school most courses begin to be labeled with a dash, for example "Math 20-1", where "-1" is the highest level followed by "-2", etc. Courses are also labeled with a 10, 20, 30, or in some cases 31. 10, the lowest, is generally taken in grade 10 followed by 20 taken in grade 11 and so on. However, there is no rule stating that one cannot take, for example, math 20-1 in grade 10, assuming one has the prerequisites. All of the available courses can be accessed here.

=== Curriculum or programs of study ===
==== Changes in curriculum ====
Under the Progressive Conservative Party of Alberta, the government adopted a discovery/inquiry based curriculum for the 2008-2009 school year, which has been heavily criticized since then by people citing declining PISA scores.

On June 15, 2016, the NDP government announced that "Alberta Education would begin to develop new curriculum... unlike any seen in Alberta" from K–12 within six years.

==== Western and Northern Canadian Protocol ====
In 1993 Alberta, Manitoba, Saskatchewan, British Columbia, Yukon Territory and Northwest Territories ministers for education signed the Western Canadian Protocol for Collaboration in Basic Education (WCP). In February 2000, Nunavut also joined NWCP. Its main goal is to create frameworks with learning outcomes in mathematics, language arts and international languages. In 2014 the agreement was placed in abeyance. Therefore, the WNCP is no longer developing curriculum frameworks.

==== City of Lloydminster situation ====
The City of Lloydminster straddles the Alberta/Saskatchewan border, and both the public and separate school systems in that city are counted in the above numbers: both of them operate according to Saskatchewan law.

=== Issues ===
Current issues for K–12 education in Alberta include, but are not limited to:

1. grade inflation;
2. the balance of power between school boards and the education ministry;
3. public school funding;
4. private school funding;
5. the manner in which the curriculum is taught, such as discovery learning, personalized learning and reform mathematics;
6. LGBT sex education;
7. class sizes;

=== Initiatives ===
==== Alberta Initiative for School Improvement ====
The Alberta Initiative for School Improvement (AISI) was an Alberta government initiative which sought to "improve student learning and performance by fostering initiatives that reflect the unique needs and circumstances of each school authority."

Funding for AISI was suspended as part of the 2013 Alberta Budget.

==== Inspiring Education: A Dialogue with Albertans ====
This was enacted in 2009 by the then Minister of Education of Alberta, Canada, David Hancock and Alberta Education to encourage discussion relating to building a long-term education framework focusing on values, goals, and processes.

== Standardized testing ==
=== Provincial Achievement Tests ===
Provincial Achievement Tests (PATs) are exams taken in grades 6 and 9 by almost all students of the province in the subject areas of mathematics, sciences, language arts, and social studies. The exams are administered in both French and English.

=== Diploma examinations ===
Diploma examinations, or "diplomas" in colloquial use, are exams taken in 30-level courses (Grade 12 courses), these include: English Language Arts 30-1 and 30-2, Mathematics 30-1 and 30-2, Biology 30, Chemistry 30, Physics 30, Science 30, and Social Studies 30-1 and 30-2. They are administered in both French and English. The diploma examinations are worth 30% of a student's final grade as of 2015, before which the exams were weighted as 50% of a student's grade. Alberta is unique among the provinces in that it requires these exams.

=== International examinations ===
Alberta works, like many Canadian provinces, with national, international, and interprovincial organizations.

==== Programme for International Student Assessment ====
The Programme for International Student Assessment or PISA's, is a worldwide study by the Organisation for Economic Co-operation and Development (OECD) in member and non-member nations of 15-year-old school pupils' scholastic performance on mathematics, science, and reading. Canada takes part in the studies and the Council of Ministers of Education, Canada releases reports stating the individual provinces scores. Reports can be found here. While Alberta used to have some of the highest scores in the world its scores have since been steadily decreasing. Critics like the Alberta Teachers' Association says that the tests are unfair as they do not highlight other strengths and that other countries teach to the test while Albertan teachers are required to teach the curriculum.

Canadian and Albertan Math PISA Scores 2000 to 2018

Canadian and Albertan Reading PISA Scores 2000 to 2018

Canadian and Albertan Science PISA Scores 2000 to 2018

== Higher education ==
Higher education in Alberta may also be referred to as post-secondary or tertiary education.

Alberta's oldest university is the University of Alberta in Edmonton. The University of Calgary, once affiliated with the University of Alberta, gained its autonomy in 1966 and is now the second largest university in Alberta. The University of Lethbridge has campuses in Lethbridge, Calgary, and Edmonton. Athabasca University focuses on distance learning. In September 2009, the Government of Alberta designated two colleges as universities, creating MacEwan University in Edmonton and Mount Royal University in Calgary.

There are 13 colleges that receive direct public funding, along with two technical institutes, NAIT and SAIT. There is also a large and active private sector of post-secondary institutions, including DeVry University.

Students may also receive government loans and grants while attending selected private institutions. One such scholarship is the Rutherford Scholarship. There has been some controversy in recent years over the rising cost of post-secondary education for students (as opposed to taxpayers). In 2005, Premier Ralph Klein made a promise that he would freeze tuition and look into ways of reducing schooling costs. So far, no plan has been released by the Alberta government.

== See also ==
- Education in Canada
- Alberta charter schools
- Higher education in Alberta
- List of Alberta school authorities
- List of universities and colleges in Alberta
- Public school authorities' Association of Alberta
- List of Canada-accredited schools abroad
