= International Community of Mennonite Brethren =

The International Community of Mennonite Brethren (ICOMB) was officially launched at the 1990 Mennonite World Conference in Winnipeg, Manitoba as a partnership of global Mennonite Brethren conferences.

ICOMB was originally conceived by leaders of MBMS International (now known as "Multiply") at an international mission consultation in Curitiba, Brazil in 1988. ICOMB functions as a framework for Mennonite Brethren conferences (national associations of congregations) worldwide to relate as peers rather than as mission churches under the structure of MBMS International.

In 2005 the term "committee" was officially changed to "community" by the conference representatives assembled at ICOMB's annual leadership summit in Japan.

In 2005, Victor Wall, president and representative of the Paraguay-German Mennonite Brethren Conference, was chosen to be the first Executive Secretary of ICOMB. He completed his term in 2010. In 2011, David Wiebe of Canada was chosen to be Executive Secretary. He had resigned from his position as Executive Director of the Canadian Conference of Mennonite Brethren Churches in 2010. In 2018 Rudi Plett of the Paraguay-German Mennonite Brethren Conference, who had chaired the ICOMB Executive Committee 2011-2017, and then served as Associate Director overseeing the Latin American churches, was chosen to be Executive Secretary.

== Membership ==
ICOMB members are national associations of Mennonite Brethren churches, also known as conferences. Names of members are listed by continent.

- Africa
  - Community of the Churches of the Mennonite Brethren of Congo – CEFMC
  - Evangelical Church of the Mennonite Brethren of Angola – IEIMA
  - Mennonite Brethren Church of Malawi - MBCM
- Asia
  - Conference of the Mennonite Brethren Church of India – CMBI
  - Japan Mennonite Brethren Conference – JMBC
  - Khmu Mission - KM
- Europe
  - Association of the Mennonite Brethren of Portugal – AIMP
  - Bund Taufgesinnter Gemeinden (Germany) – BTG
  - Conference of Mennonite Brethren Churches in Germany – AMBD
  - Mennonite Free Church of Austria – MFO
  - Mennonite Brethren Church of Bavaria – VMBB
  - Lithuania Free Christian Church – LLKB
- Latin America
  - Association of the Mennonite Brethren Church of Colombia – AIHMC
  - Brazilian Convention of Evangelical Mennonite Brethren Churches – COBIM
  - Council of the Mennonite Brethren Churches of Uruguay – CCHMU
  - Evangelical Convention of Paraguayan Mennonite Brethren Churches (Spanish) – CEIPHM
  - Paraguayan Mennonite Brethren Conference (German) – AHM
  - Mennonite Brethren Evangelical Church of Peru – IEHM
  - United Evangelical Church of Mennonite Brethren in Panama – IEUHM
  - Christian Peace Church of Mexico – ICPM
- English North America
  - Canadian Conference of Mennonite Brethren Churches – CCMBC
  - United States Conference of Mennonite Brethren Churches – USCMBC

== See also ==
- Canadian Conference of Mennonite Brethren Churches
- Japan Mennonite Brethren Conference
- US Conference of Mennonite Brethren Churches
