= MBMS International =

MBMS International, now called Multiply, is the global missions agency of the US and Canadian MB (Mennonite Brethren) churches. With missionaries in over 25 countries, Multiply also partners with other Mennonite Brethren conferences around the world in mission work. The International Office is in Abbotsford, British Columbia, Canada.

Historical names include: MB Mission, MBMS International (MBMSI), Mennonite Brethren Missions/Services (MBM/S) and Board of Missions and Services (BOMAS).

== See also ==
- Mennonite
- Canadian Conference of Mennonite Brethren Churches
- US Conference of Mennonite Brethren Churches
- International Committee of Mennonite Brethren (ICOMB)
