= Mennonite Brethren Church =

Christian evangelical denomination

Mennonite Brethren
Founder
- Peaceful Anabaptists

Regions with significant populations
- India, Democratic Republic of Congo, SE Asia, Canada, United States of America.

Religions
- Anabaptist

Scriptures
- The Bible

The Mennonite Brethren Church is an evangelical Mennonite Anabaptist movement with congregations.

== History ==
The conference was established among Plautdietsch-speaking Russian Mennonites in 1860. During the 1850s, some Mennonites were influenced by Radical Pietism, which found its way into the Mennonite colonies of the southern Russian Empire now known as Ukraine. Mennonite immigrants from West Prussia who had been influenced by pietistic leaders transplanted those ideas to the large Molotschna colony. The pastor of a neighboring congregation, Eduard Wüst, reinforced this pietism. Wüst was a revivalist who stressed repentance and Christ as a personal savior, influencing Catholics, Lutherans and Mennonites in the area. He associated with many Mennonite leaders, including Leonhard Sudermann.

In 1859, Joseph Höttmann, a former associate of Wüst met with a group of Mennonites to discuss problems within the main Mennonite body. Their discussion centered on participating in communion with church members who were living in a way that seemed unholy or were not converted, and baptism of adults by immersion, which was distinct from other Mennonite churches who primarily baptized by pouring.

On January 6, 1860, this growing group of Mennonites influenced by a combination of Prussian Mennonite pietism, contacts with Moravian Brethren and indirectly through the influential preaching of Eduard Wüst, met in the village of Elisabeththal, Molotschna and formed the Mennonite Brethren Church. They felt that other Mennonites had grown cold and formal, and were seeking greater emphasis on discipline, prayer and Bible study. The group presented a document to the elders of the Molotschna Mennonite Churches which indicated "that the total Mennonite brotherhood has decayed to the extent that we can no more be part of it" and fear the "approach of an unavoidable judgment of God." The immediate catalyst for the new organization was the discipline placed on a body of brethren who met to observe communion in a private home without the elders' sanction. The Mennonite Brethren were also in contact with and influenced by German Baptists J. G. Oncken and August Liebig.

The Mennonite Brethren movement spread throughout the Mennonite colonies and produced many distinguished leaders, particularly in Molotschna. These include P. M. Friesen (educator and historian), Jakob and Abraham Kroeker (writers), Heinrich Braun (publisher), Peter Braun (educator) and A. H. Unruh (educator). Jakob Kroeker (1872–1948) was one of the most prolific Mennonite writers, completing a fourteen volume Old Testament commentary. By breaking religious and cultural patterns that had become a hindrance to Mennonite society, the contribution of the Mennonite Brethren allowed all Mennonite groups in Russia to pursue a more wholesome Christian life.

The Mennonite Brethren movement also spread through missionary endeavor. They commissioned the first missionaries to travel from Southern Russia (Ukraine) to India in 1887, establishing congregations in the Hyderabad, Telangana State, region. In the ensuing years, Mennonite Brethren churches have been established in SE Asia, Africa, Europe, and Latin America.

Because of growing pressure by the Czarist government and later because of the political turmoil of the Russian Revolution, significant numbers of the Mennonite Brethren moved to the United States, Canada, Paraguay, Brazil and Mexico. In the Soviet Union their organizational structures ceased to exist by 1930 due to Communist persecution. At that time some remaining Mennonite Brethren moved from Ukraine to the republics of Soviet Central Asia. After World War II several Mennonite Brethren churches emerged in that region. In 1966 they joined the Evangelical-Baptist Union—an umbrella organization tightly controlled by the Soviet government.

== See also ==
- Bethany College (Saskatchewan)
- Canadian Conference of Mennonite Brethren Churches
- Canadian Mennonite University
- Columbia Bible College (Abbotsford, British Columbia)
- Conference of the Mennonite Brethren Churches in India
- École de Théologie Évangélique de Montréal
- Fresno Pacific University
- Fresno Pacific University Biblical Seminary
- Immanuel Schools
- International Committee of Mennonite Brethren (ICOMB)
- Japan Mennonite Brethren Conference
- Mennonite Brethren Collegiate Institute
- Tabor College, Kansas
- US Conference of Mennonite Brethren Churches
