= The Exodus =

Founding myth of the Jewish people

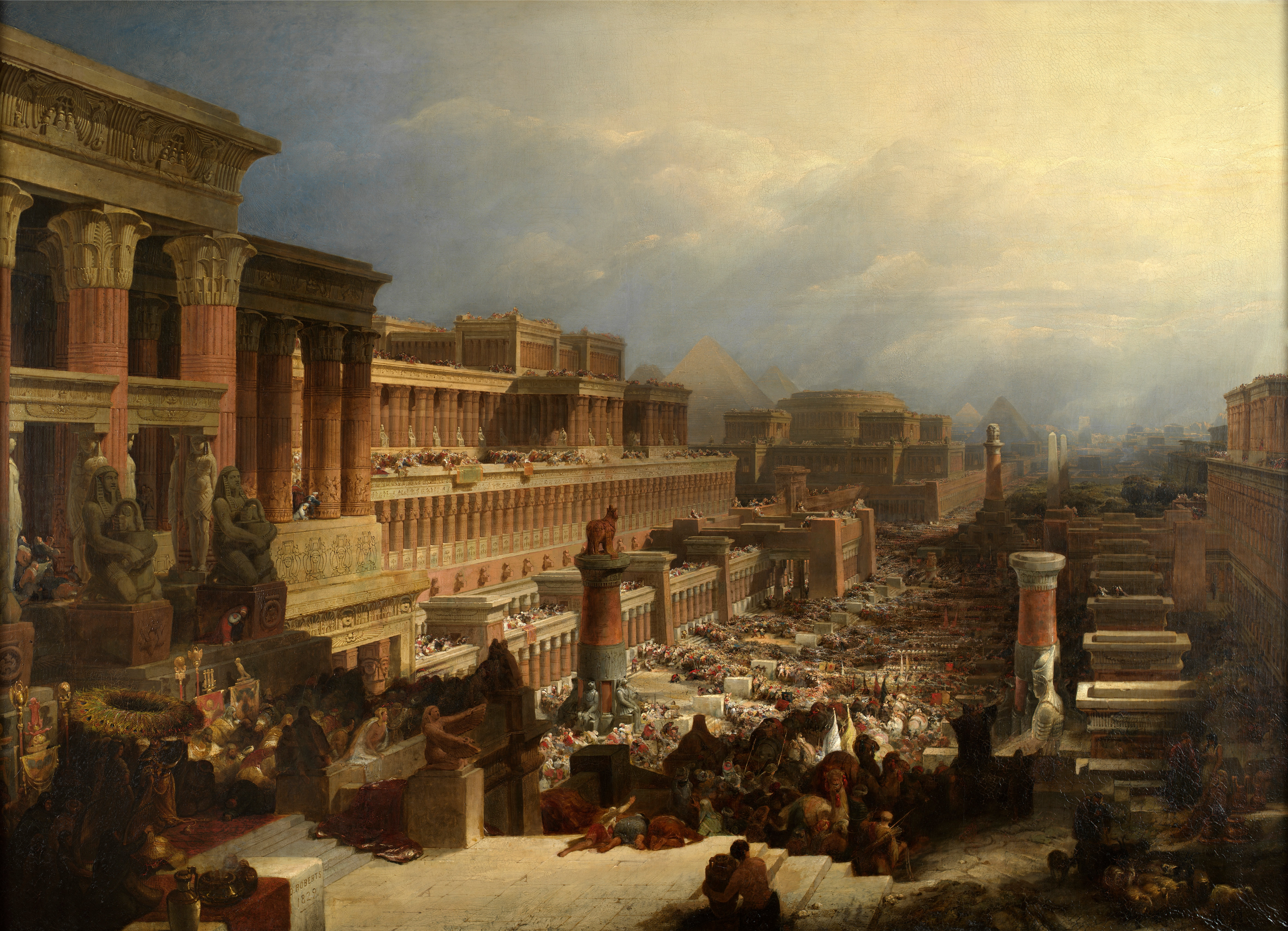
The Departure of the Israelites (David Roberts, 1829)

The Exodus (Hebrew: יציאת מצרים, romanized: Yəṣīʾat Mīṣrayīm, lit. 'Departure from Egypt' (Note: The name Exodus derives from Ancient Greek ἔξοδος, exodos, 'going out')) is the founding myth (Note: The term myth is used here in its academic sense, meaning "a traditional story consisting of events that are ostensibly historical, though often supernatural, explaining the origins of a cultural practice or natural phenomenon". It is not being used to mean "something that is false".) of the Israelites whose narrative is spread over four of the five books of the Pentateuch (Exodus, Leviticus, Numbers, and Deuteronomy). The narrative describes a history of Egyptian bondage of the Israelites followed by their exodus from Egypt through a passage in the Red Sea, in pursuit of the Promised Land under the leadership of Moses.

The story of the Exodus is central in Judaism. It is recounted daily in Jewish prayers and celebrated in festivals such as Passover. Early Christians saw the Exodus as a typological prefiguration of resurrection and salvation by Jesus. The Exodus is also recounted in the Quran as part of the extensive referencing of the life of Moses, a major prophet in Islam. The narrative has also resonated with various groups in more recent centuries, such as among African Americans striving for freedom and civil rights, and in liberation theology.

The consensus of modern scholars on the historicity of the Exodus is that the Pentateuch does not give an accurate account of the origins of the Israelites, who appear instead to have emerged in the central highlands of Canaan in the late second millennium BCE (around the time of the Late Bronze Age collapse) from the indigenous Canaanite culture. Most modern scholars believe that some elements in the story might have some historical basis, but that it has little resemblance to the story told in the Pentateuch. While the majority of modern scholars date the composition of the Pentateuch to the period of the Achaemenid Empire (5th century BCE), elements of this narrative are older, since allusions to it are made by 8th-century BCE prophets such as Amos and Hosea.

== In the Bible ==
The Exodus tells a story of the enslavement of the Israelites, the Plagues of Egypt, the departure of the Israelites from Egypt, the revelations at Mount Sinai, and the Israelite wanderings in the wilderness up to the borders of Canaan. Its message is that the Israelites were delivered from slavery by Yahweh their god, and therefore belong to him by covenant.

=== Narrative ===
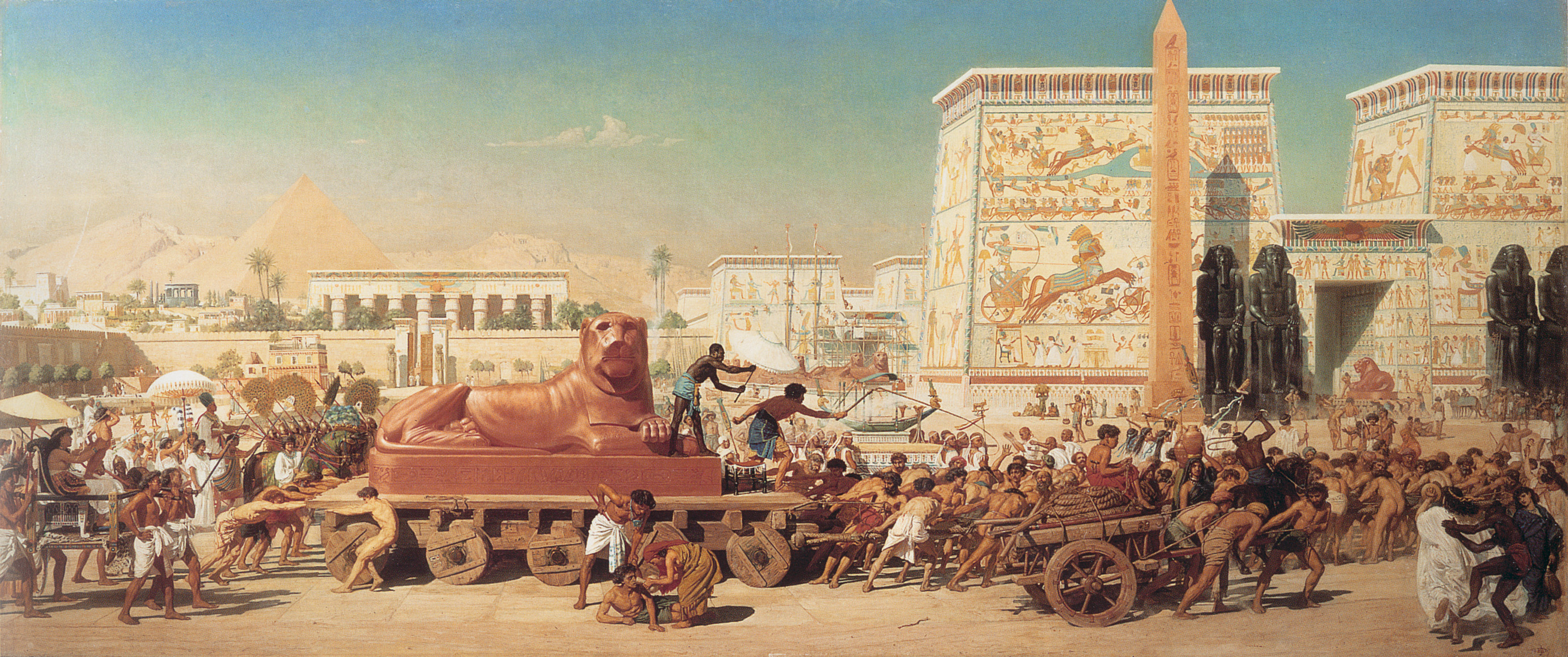
Israel in Egypt (Edward Poynter, 1867)

The story of the Exodus is told in the first half of the book of Exodus, with the remainder recounting the 1st year in the wilderness, and followed by a narrative of 39 more years in the books of Leviticus, Numbers, and Deuteronomy, the last four of the first five books of the Bible (also called the Torah or Pentateuch). In the first book of the Pentateuch, the Book of Genesis, the Israelites had come to live in Egypt in the Land of Goshen during a famine, under the protection of an Israelite, Joseph, who had become a high official in the court of the Egyptian pharaoh. Exodus begins with the death of Joseph and the ascension of a new pharaoh "who did not know Joseph" (Exodus 1:8).

The pharaoh becomes concerned by the number and strength of the Israelites in Egypt and enslaves them, commanding them to build at two "supply" or "store cities" called Pithom and Rameses (Exodus 1:11). (Note: A "store city" or "supply city" was a city used to store provisions and garrison an important campaign route. The Septuagint version includes a reference to a third "supply city" built by the Hebrews: " On, which is Heliopolis" (LXX Exodus 1:11, trans. Larry J. Perkins).) The pharaoh also orders the slaughter at birth of all male Hebrew children. One Hebrew child, however, is rescued and abandoned in a floating basket on the Nile. He is found and adopted by Pharaoh's daughter, who names him Moses. Grown to a young man, Moses kills an Egyptian he sees beating a Hebrew slave, and takes refuge in the land of Midian, where he marries Tzipporah, a daughter of the Midianite priest Jethro. The old pharaoh dies and a new one ascends the throne.

According to Ezekiel 20:8–9, the enslaved Israelites also practised "abominations" and worshiped the gods of Egypt. This provoked Yahweh to destroy them but he relented to avoid his name being "profaned".

Meanwhile, Moses goes to Mount Horeb, where Yahweh appears in a burning bush and commands him to go to Egypt to free the Hebrew slaves and bring them to the Promised Land in Canaan. Yahweh also speaks to Moses's brother Aaron, and the two assemble the Israelites and perform miraculous signs to rouse their belief in Yahweh's promise. Moses and Aaron then go to Pharaoh and ask him to let the Israelites go into the desert for a religious festival, but he refuses and increases their workload, commanding them to make bricks without straw. Moses and Aaron return to Pharaoh and ask him to free the Israelites and let them depart. Pharaoh demands Moses to perform a miracle, and Aaron throws down Moses' staff, which turns into a tannin (sea monster or snake) (Exodus 7:8-13); however, Pharaoh's magicians (Note: These magicians are referred to in the Hebrew text asḥartummîm, which derives from Ancient Egyptianḥrj-tp (Demoticp-hritob,Akkadian: ḥar-tibi) a title meaning "chief" and shortened from "chief lector priest". The Pharaoh's magicians are able to replicate Moses and Aaron's actions until the third plague (gnats), when they are the first to recognize that a divine power is at work (Exodus 8:19). In plague four (festering boils), they themselves are afflicted and no longer contest with Moses and Aaron.) are also able to do this, though Moses' serpent devours the others. Pharaoh refuses to let the Israelites go.

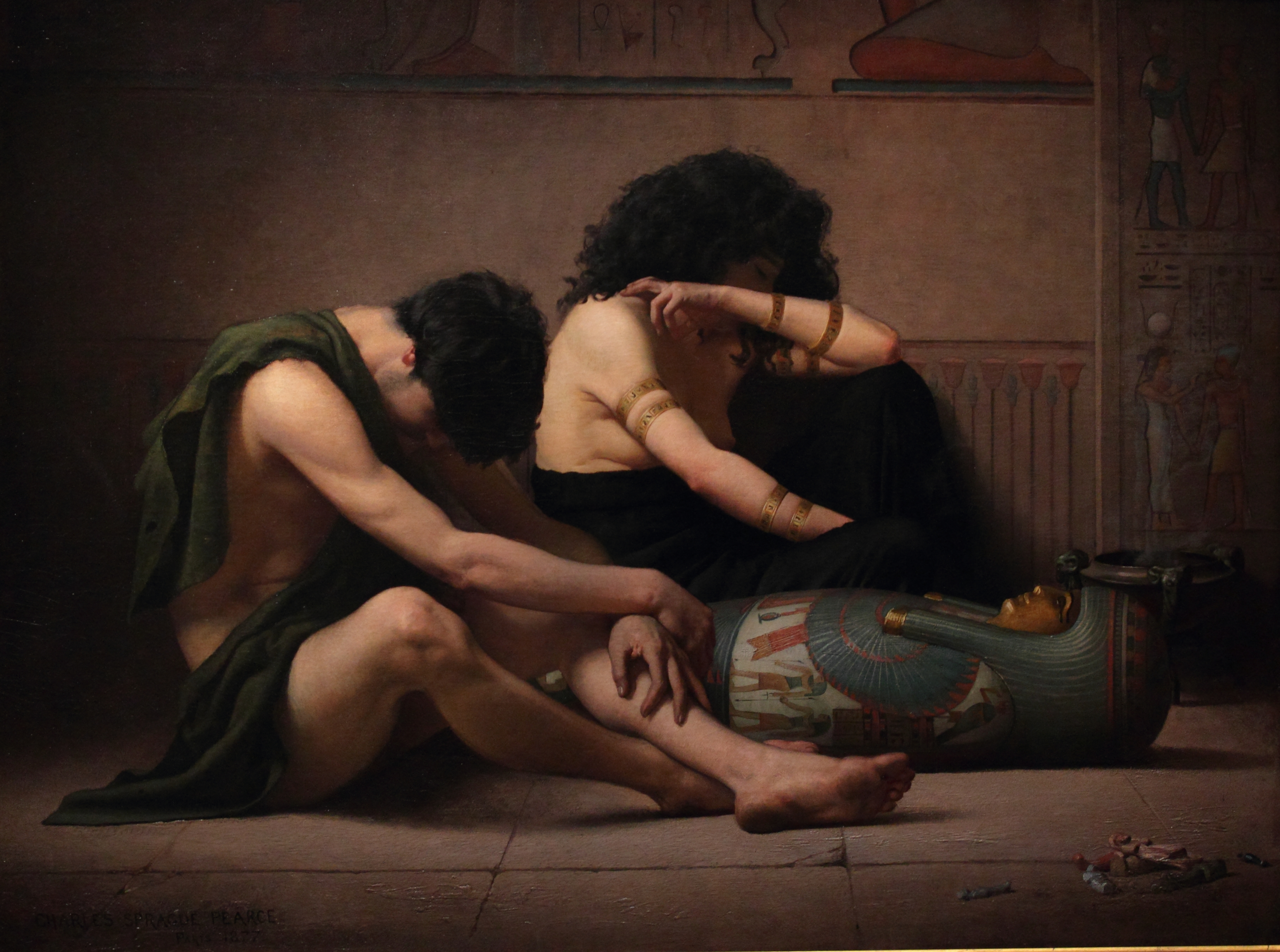
Lamentations over the Death of the First-Born of Egypt by Charles Sprague Pearce (1877)

After this, Yahweh inflicts a series of Plagues on the Egyptians each time Moses repeats his demand and Pharaoh refuses to release the Israelites. Pharaoh's magicians are able to match the first plagues, in which Yahweh turns the Nile to blood and produces a plague of frogs, but they cannot match any plagues starting with the third, the plague of gnats. After each plague, Pharaoh asks the Israelites to worship Yahweh to remove the plague, then still refuses to free them.

Moses is commanded to fix the first month of Aviv at the head of the Hebrew calendar. He instructs the Israelites to take a lamb on the 10th day, and on the 14th day to slaughter it and daub its blood on their doorposts and lintels, and to observe the Passover meal that night, the night of the full moon. In the final plague, Yahweh kills the firstborn sons and firstborn cattle of the Egyptians, but the Israelites are spared this by the blood on their doorposts. Yahweh commands the Israelites to commemorate this event in "a perpetual ordinance" (Exodus 12:14).

Pharaoh finally casts the Israelites out of Egypt after his firstborn son is killed. Yahweh leads the Israelites in the form of a pillar of cloud in the day and a pillar of fire at night. However, once the Israelites have left, Yahweh "hardens" Pharaoh's heart to change his mind and pursue the Israelites to the shore of the Red Sea. Moses uses his staff to part the Red Sea, and the Israelites cross on dry ground, but the sea closes on the pursuing Egyptians, drowning them all.

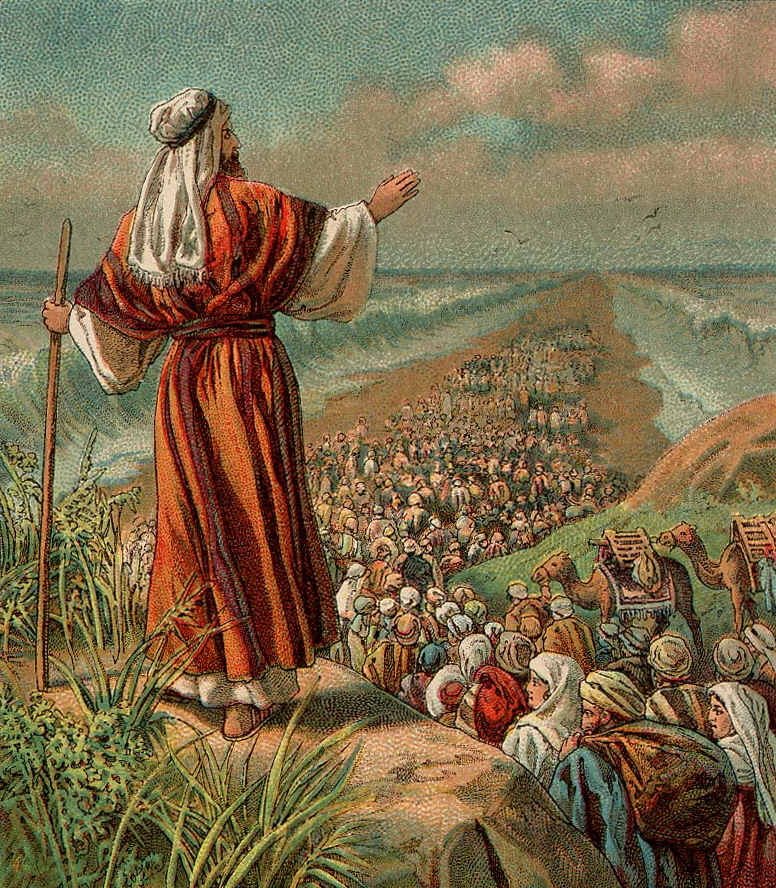
Moses parts the Red Sea (1907 print)

The Israelites begin to complain, and Yahweh miraculously provides them with water and food, eventually raining manna down for them to eat. The Amalekites attack at Rephidim, but are defeated. Jethro, the father-in-law of Moses, convinces him to appoint judges for the tribes of Israel. The Israelites reach the Sinai Desert and Yahweh calls Moses to Mount Sinai, where Yahweh reveals himself to his people and establishes the Ten Commandments and Mosaic covenant: the Israelites are to keep his torah (law, instruction), and Yahweh promises them the land of Canaan.

Yahweh establishes the Aaronic priesthood and detailed rules for ritual worship, among other laws. However, in Moses's absence the Israelites sin against Yahweh by creating the idol of a golden calf. As punishment Yahweh has the Levites kill three thousand of the Israelites (Exodus 32:28), and Yahweh sends a plague on them. The Israelites now accept the covenant, which is reestablished; they build a tabernacle for Yahweh, and receive their laws. Yahweh commands Moses to take a census of the Israelites and establishes the duties of the Levites. Then the Israelites depart from Mount Sinai.

Yahweh commands Moses to send twelve spies ahead to Canaan to scout the land. The spies discover that the Canaanites are formidable, and to dissuade the Israelites from invading, the spies falsely report that Canaan is full of giants (Numbers 13:30-33). The Israelites refuse to go to Canaan, and Yahweh declares that the generation that left Egypt will have to pass away before the Israelites can enter the promised land. The Israelites will have to remain in the wilderness for forty years, and Yahweh kills the spies through a plague except for the righteous Joshua and Caleb, who will be allowed to enter the promised land (Numbers 13:36-38). A group of Israelites led by Korah, son of Izhar, rebels against Moses, but Yahweh opens the earth and sends them living to Sheol (Numbers 16:1-33).

The Israelites come to the oasis of Kadesh Barnea, where Miriam dies and the Israelites remain for nineteen years. To provide water, Yahweh commands Moses to get water from a rock by speaking to it, but Moses instead strikes the rock with his staff, for which Yahweh forbids him from entering the Promised Land. Moses sends a messenger to the king of Edom requesting passage through his land to Canaan, but the king refuses. The Israelites then go to Mount Hor, where Aaron dies. The Israelites try to go around Edom, but the Israelites complain about lack of bread and water, so Yahweh sends a plague of poisonous snakes to afflict them (Numbers 21:4–7).

After Moses prays for deliverance, Yahweh has him create a brazen serpent, and the Israelites who look at it are cured (Numbers 21:8–9). The Israelites are soon in conflict with various other kingdoms, and king Balak of Moab asks the seer Balaam to curse the Israelites, but Balaam blesses them instead. Some Israelites begin having sexual relations with Moabite women and worshipping Moabite gods, so Yahweh orders Moses to impale the idolators and sends another plague. The full extent of Yahweh's wrath is averted when Phinehas impales an Israelite and a Midianite woman having intercourse (Numbers 25:7-9). Yahweh commands the Israelites to destroy the Midianites, and Moses and Phinehas take another census. Then they conquer the lands of Og and Sihon in Transjordan, settling the Gadites, Reubenites, and half the Tribe of Manasseh there.

Moses then addresses the Israelites for a final time on the banks of the Jordan River, reviewing their travels and giving them further laws. Yahweh tells Moses to summon Joshua to lead the conquest of Canaan. Yahweh tells Moses to ascend Mount Nebo, from where he sees the Promised Land, and dies.

=== Covenant and law ===
The climax of the Exodus is the covenant (binding legal agreement) between God and the Israelites mediated by Moses at Sinai: Yahweh will protect the Israelites as his chosen people for all time, and the Israelites will keep Yahweh's laws and worship only him. The covenant is described in stages: at Exodus 24:3–8 the Israelites agree to abide by the "book of the covenant" that Moses has just read to them; shortly afterwards God writes the "words of the covenant"—the Ten Commandments—on stone tablets; and finally, as the people gather in Moab to cross into the promised land of Canaan, Moses reveals Yahweh's new covenant "beside the covenant he made with them at Horeb" (Deuteronomy 29:1). The laws are set out in a number of codes:

- Ethical Decalogue or Ten Commandments, Exodus 20 and Deuteronomy 5;
- The Book of the Covenant, Exodus 20:22–23:3;
- Ritual Decalogue, Exodus 34;
- The ritual laws of Leviticus 1–6 and Numbers 1–10;
- The Holiness Code, Leviticus 17–26;
- Deuteronomic Code, Deuteronomy 12–26.

== Origins and historicity ==
There are two main positions on the historicity of the Exodus in modern scholarship. The majority position is that the biblical Exodus narrative has some historical basis, although there is little of historical fact in it. (Note: "The biblical text has its own inner logic and consistency, largely divorced from the concerns of secular history. [...] conversely, the Bible, never intended to function primarily as a historical document, cannot meet modern canons of historical accuracy and reliability. There is, in fact, remarkably little of proven or provable historical worth or reliability in the biblical Exodus narrative, and no reliable independent witnesses attest to the historicity or date of the Exodus events.") The other position, often associated with the school of Biblical minimalism, is that the biblical exodus traditions are the invention of the exilic and post-exilic Jewish community, with little to no historical basis.

The biblical Exodus narrative is best understood as a founding myth of the Jewish people, providing an ideological foundation for their culture and institutions, not an accurate depiction of the history of the Israelites. The view that the biblical narrative is essentially correct unless it can explicitly be proved wrong (Biblical maximalism) is today held by "few, if any [...] in mainstream scholarship, only on the more fundamentalist fringes." There is no direct evidence for any of the people or events of Exodus in non-biblical ancient texts or in archaeological remains, and this has led most scholars to omit the Exodus events from comprehensive histories of Israel.

=== Reliability of the biblical account ===
Most mainstream scholars do not accept the biblical Exodus account as history for a number of reasons. Most agree that the Exodus stories were written centuries after the apparent setting of the stories. Scholars argue that the Book of Exodus itself attempts to ground the event firmly in history, reconstructing a date for the exodus as the 2666th year after creation (Exodus 12:40–41), the construction of the tabernacle to year 2667 (Exodus 40:1–2, 17), stating that the Israelites dwelled in Egypt for 430 years (Exodus 12:40–41), and specifying place names such as Goshen (Gen. 46:28), Pithom, and Ramesses (Exod. 1:11), as well as the count of 600,000 Israelite men (Exodus 12:37).

The Book of Numbers further states that the number of Israelite males aged 20 years and older in the desert during the wandering was 603,550, which works out to a total population of 2.5–3 million including women and children—far more than could be supported by the Sinai Desert. The geography is vague with regions such as Goshen unidentified, (Note: It must be stated, however, that while there is no consensus on the identity of the Land of Goshen, some proposals for its original location have been advanced.) and there are internal problems with dating in the Pentateuch. No modern attempt to identify a historical Egyptian as a prototype for Moses has found wide acceptance, and no period in Egyptian history matches the biblical accounts of the Exodus. Some elements of the story are miraculous and defy rational explanation, such as the Plagues of Egypt and the Crossing of the Red Sea. The Bible does not mention the names of any of the pharaohs involved, further obscuring comparison of archaeologically recovered Egyptian history with the biblical narrative.

While ancient Egyptian texts from the New Kingdom mention "Asiatics" living in Egypt as slaves and workers, these people cannot be securely connected to the Israelites, and no contemporary Egyptian text mentions a large-scale exodus of slaves like that described in the Bible. The earliest surviving historical mention of the Israelites, the Egyptian Merneptah Stele (c. 1207 BCE), appears to place them in or around Canaan and gives no indication of any exodus. Archaeologist Israel Finkelstein argues from his analysis of the itinerary lists in the books of Exodus, Numbers and Deuteronomy that the biblical account represents a long-term cultural memory, spanning the 16th to 10th centuries BCE, rather than a specific event: "The beginning is vague and now untraceable." Instead, modern archaeology suggests continuity between Canaanite and Israelite settlement, indicating a primarily Canaanite origin for Israel, with no suggestion that a group of foreigners from Egypt comprised early Israel.

=== Potential historical origins ===
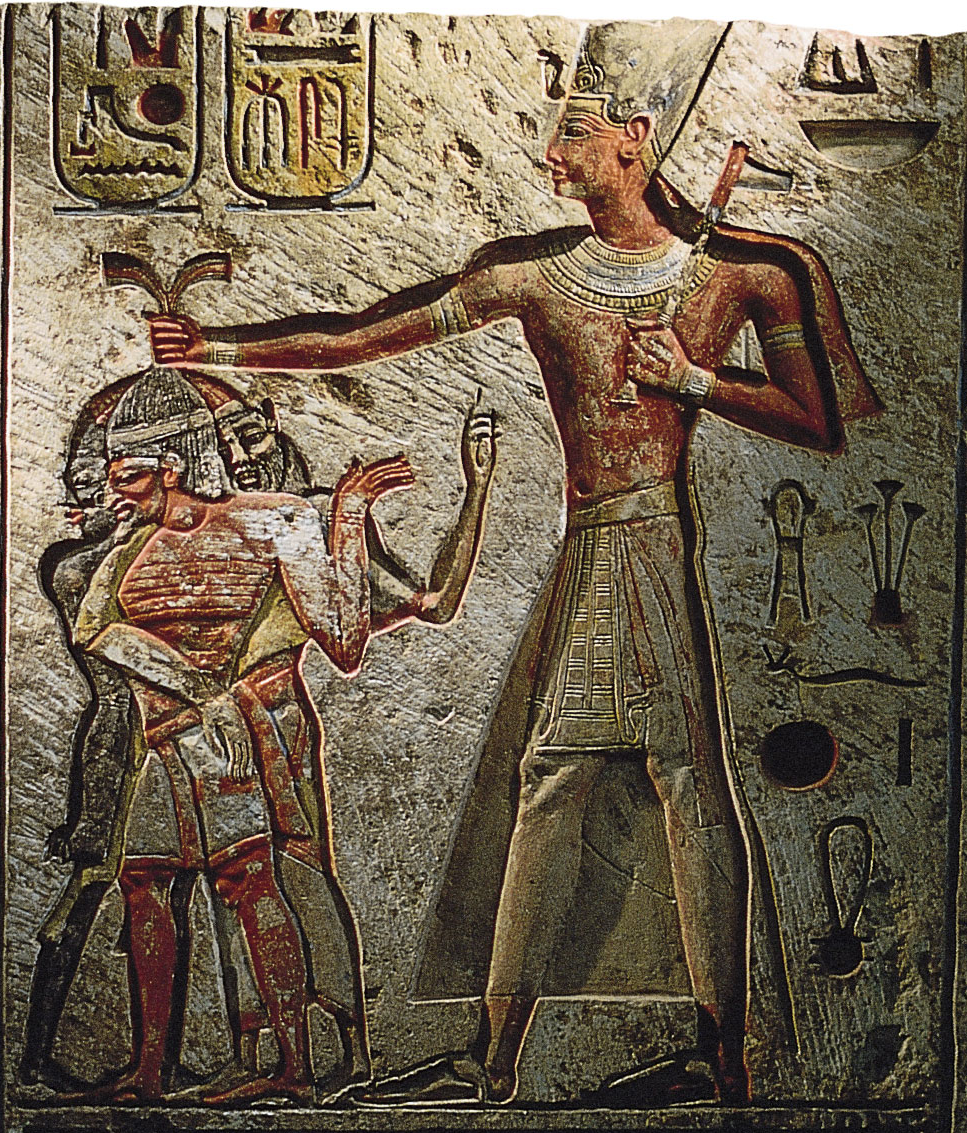
Ramesses II, one of several suggested pharaohs in the Exodus narrative. Created c. 1250 BCE

Despite the absence of any archaeological evidence, according to Avraham Faust, "most scholars agree that the narrative has a historical core" made up of a probable reconstruction of an Exodus based on similar collective memories, with biblical scholar Kenton Sparks referring to it as "mythologized history". Faust specifies that the result of his assessment is unlikely if it is solely based on either Egyptian presence in Late Bronze Age Canaan or the foreign Hyksos rulers of Egypt, and rules out Midian human activity "which cannot help in dating the Exodus" in identification of the proto-Israelites. Agreeing in treating the expulsion of the Hyksos "not as related to the flight of a group of slaves[,]" Manfred Bietak points out that the portrayal of the Hyksos as a ruling elite with a background in trade and seafaring conflicts with the biblical portrayal of the Israelites as oppressed in Egypt. Most scholars posit that a small group of Egyptian origin may have joined the early Israelites, and contributed their own Egyptian Exodus story to all of Israel. (Note: "While there is a consensus among scholars that the Exodus did not take place in the manner described in the Bible, surprisingly most scholars agree that the narrative has a historical core, and that some of the highland settlers came, one way or another, from Egypt..." "Archaeology does not really contribute to the debate over the historicity or even historical background of the Exodus itself, but if there was indeed such a group, it contributed the Exodus story to that of all Israel. While I agree that it is most likely that there was such a group, I must stress that this is based on an overall understanding of the development of collective memory and of the authorship of the texts (and their editorial process). Archaeology, unfortunately, cannot directly contribute (yet?) to the study of this specific group of Israel's ancestors.") William G. Dever cautiously identifies this group with the Tribe of Joseph, while Richard Elliott Friedman identifies it with the Tribe of Levi.

Most scholars who accept Faust's definition of a historical core date possible Exodus group activity to the thirteenth century BCE at the time of Ramses II (19th dynasty), with some instead dating it to the twelfth century BCE under Ramses III (20th dynasty). Evidence in favor of historical traditions forming a background to the Exodus myth include the documented movements of small groups of Ancient Semitic-speaking peoples into and out of Egypt during the 18th and 19th dynasties, some elements of Egyptian folklore and culture mentioned in the Exodus narrative, and the names Moses, Aaron and Phinehas, which seem to have an Egyptian origin. Scholarly estimates for how many could have been involved in such an exodus range from a few hundred to a few thousand people. In terms of dating the Exodus, among those who have attempted to date it to a specific time, a common proposal is 1130 BCE, while a less common is 1525 BCE to align with the expulsion of the Hyksos, Ahmose I Tempest Stele and the Thera eruption, and the WS I bowl noted by William G. Dever as presented by Manfred Bietak.

Faust renders in 2023 the academic consensus about the number of people from the Exodus: "most scholars agree that it was in the range of a few thousands, or even perhaps only hundreds."

Joel S. Baden noted the presence of Semitic-speaking slaves in Egypt who sometimes escaped in small numbers as potential inspirations for the Exodus. It is also possible that oppressive Egyptian rule of Canaan during the late second millennium BCE, during the 19th and especially the 20th dynasty, may have disposed some native Canaanites to adopt into their own mythology the exodus story of a small group of Egyptian refugees. Nadav Na'aman argues that oppressive Egyptian rule of Canaan may have inspired the Exodus narrative, forming a "collective memory" of Egyptian oppression that was transferred from Canaan to Egypt itself in the popular consciousness. The 17th dynasty expulsion of the Hyksos, a group of Semitic invaders, is also frequently discussed as a potential historical parallel or origin for the story.

Many other scholars reject this view, and instead see the biblical exodus traditions as the invention of the exilic and post-exilic Jewish community, with little to no historical basis. Lester Grabbe, for instance, argues that "[t]here is no compelling reason that the exodus has to be rooted in history", and that the details of the story more closely fit the seventh through the fifth centuries BCE than the traditional dating to the second millennium BCE. Some scholars also hold that the Israelites originated in Canaan and from the Canaanites, although others disagree. Philip R. Davies suggests that the story may have been inspired by the return to Israel of Israelites and Judaeans who were placed in Egypt as garrison troops by the Assyrians in the fifth and sixth centuries BCE, during the exile.

== Development and final composition ==
=== Early traditions ===
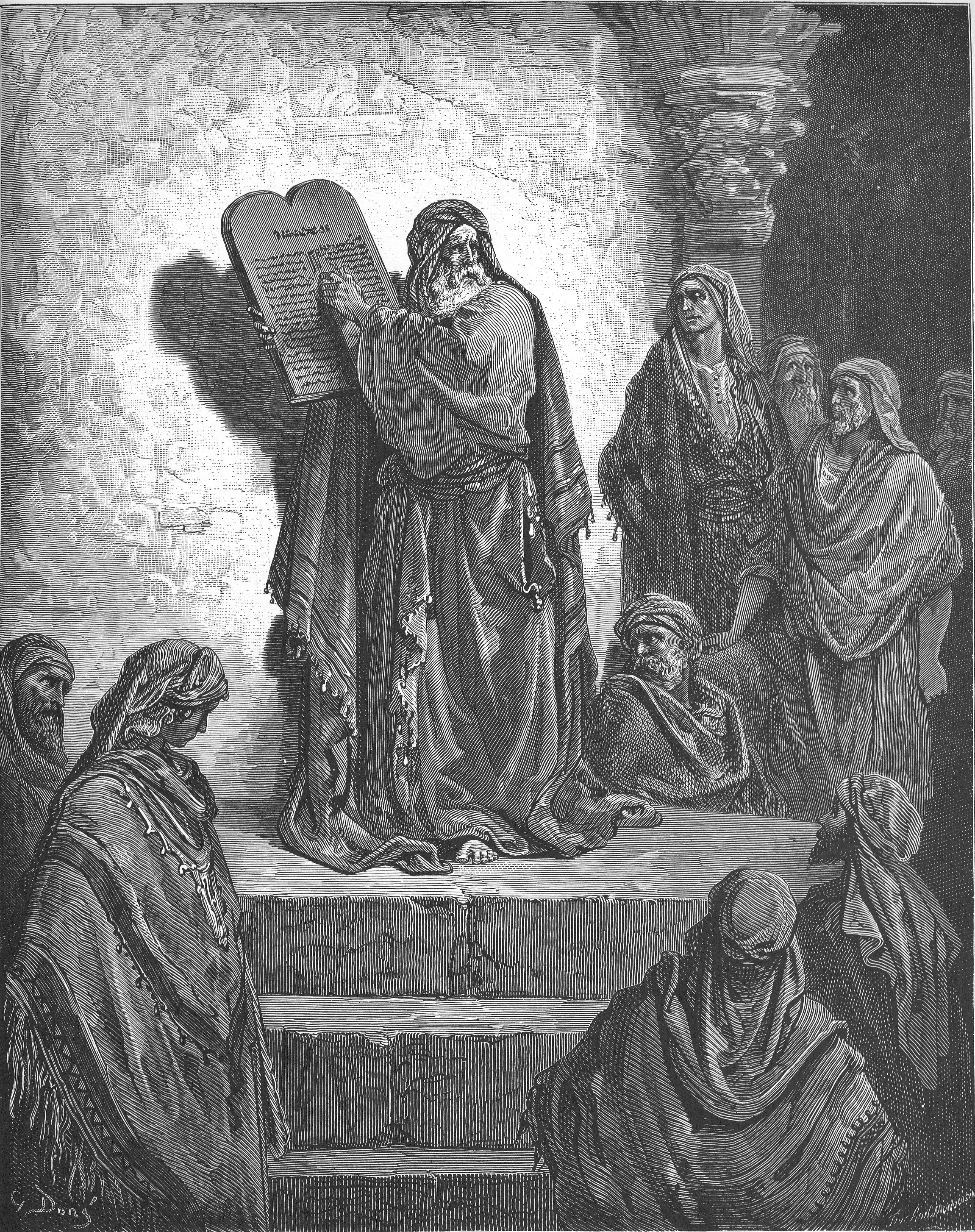
Ezra Reads the Law to the People (Gustave Doré's illustrations for La Grande Bible de Tours, 1866)

The earliest traces of the traditions behind the exodus appear in the northern prophets Amos and Hosea, both active in the 8th century BCE in northern Israel, but their southern contemporary Isaiah shows no knowledge of an exodus. Micah, who was active in the south around the same time, references the exodus once (Micah 6:4–5), but it is debated whether the passage is an addition by a later editor. (Note: Micah 6:4–5 ("I brought you up out of Egypt and redeemed you from the land of slavery; I sent Moses to lead you, also Aaron and Miriam. My people, remember what Balak king of Moab plotted and what Balaam son of Beor answered. Remember your journey from Shittim to Gilgal, that you may know the righteous acts of the Lord") is a late addition to the original book. SeeLemche (1985) p. 315Miller II, Robert D. (25 November 2013). Illuminating Moses: A History of Reception from Exodus to the Renaissance. BRILL. p. 19. ISBN 978-90-04-25854-9.,McDermott, John J. (2002). Reading the Pentateuch: A Historical Introduction. Paulist Press. p. 90. ISBN 978-0-8091-4082-4.,McKenzie, Steven L. (2005). How to Read the Bible: History, Prophecy, Literature - Why Modern Readers Need to Know the Difference and What It Means for Faith Today. Oxford University Press. p. 78. ISBN 978-0-19-803655-5.,Collins, John J. (15 April 2018). Introduction to the Hebrew Bible: Third Edition. Augsburg Fortress, Publishers. p. 354. ISBN 978-1-5064-4605-9. "Many scholars assume that the appeal to the exodus here is the work of a Deuteronomistic editor, but that is not necessarily so." andWolff, Hans Walter (1990). Micah: A Commentary. Augsburg. p. 23. ISBN 978-0-8066-2449-5. apudHamborg, Graham R. (24 May 2012). Still Selling the Righteous: A Redaction-critical Investigation of Reasons for Judgment in Amos 2.6-16. Bloomsbury Publishing. pp. 156–157. ISBN 978-0-567-04860-8.) Jeremiah, active in the 7th century, mentions both Moses and the Exodus.

The story may, therefore, have originated a few centuries earlier, perhaps in the 10th or 9th century BCE, and there are signs that it took different forms in Israel, in the Transjordan region, and in the southern Kingdom of Judah before being unified in the Persian era. The Exodus narrative was most likely further altered and expanded under the influence of the return from the Babylonian captivity in the sixth century BCE.

Evidence from the Bible suggests that the Exodus from Egypt formed a "foundational mythology" or "state ideology" for the Northern Kingdom of Israel. The northern psalms 80 and 81 state that God "brought a vine out of Egypt" (Psalm 80:8) and record ritual observances of Israel's deliverance from Egypt as well as a version of part of the Ten Commandments (Psalm 81:10–11). The Books of Kings records the dedication of two golden calves in Bethel and Dan by the Israelite king Jeroboam I, who uses the words "Here are your gods, O Israel, which brought you up out of the land of Egypt" (1 Kings 12:28). Scholars relate Jeroboam's calves to the golden calf made by Aaron of Exodus 32. Both include a nearly identical dedication formula ("These are your gods, O Israel, who brought you up out of the land of Egypt", Exodus 32:8). This episode in Exodus is "widely regarded as a tendentious narrative against the Bethel calves". Egyptologist Jan Assmann suggests that event, which would have taken place c. 931 BCE, may be partially historical due to its association with the historical pharaoh Sheshonq I (the biblical Shishak). Stephen Russell dates this tradition to "the eighth century BCE or earlier", and argued that it preserves a genuine Exodus tradition from the Northern Kingdom, but in a Judahite recension. Russell and Frank Moore Cross argue that the Israelites of the Northern Kingdom may have believed that the calves at Bethel and Dan were made by Aaron. Russell suggests that the connection to Jeroboam may have been later, possibly coming from a Judahite redactor. Pauline Viviano, however, concludes that neither the references to Jeroboam's calves in Hosea (Hosea 8:6 and 10:5) nor the frequent prohibitions of idol worship in the seventh-century southern prophet Jeremiah show any knowledge of a tradition of a golden calf having been created in Sinai.

Some of the earliest evidence for Judahite traditions of the exodus is found in Psalm 78, which portrays the Exodus as beginning a history culminating in the building of the temple at Jerusalem. Pamela Barmash argues that the psalm is a polemic against the Northern Kingdom; as it fails to mention that kingdom's destruction in 722 BCE, she concludes that it must have been written before then. The psalm's version of the Exodus contains some important differences from what is found in the Pentateuch: there is no mention of Moses, and the manna is described as "food of the mighty" rather than as bread in the wilderness. Nadav Na'aman argues for other signs that the Exodus was a tradition in Judah before the destruction of the northern kingdom, including the Song of the Sea and Psalm 114, as well as the great political importance that the narrative came to assume there. (Note: However, the date of composition of the Song of the Sea - ostensibly celebrating the victory at the Reed Sea - ranges from an early mid-12th century BCE period through post-exilic times, down to as late as 350 BCE.) A Judahite cultic object associated with the exodus was the brazen serpent or nehushtan: according to 2 Kings 18:4, the brazen serpent had been made by Moses and was worshiped in the temple in Jerusalem until the time of king Hezekiah of Judah, who destroyed it as part of a religious reform, possibly c. 727 BCE. (Note: "[Hezekiah] broke in pieces the bronze serpent that Moses had made, for until those days the people of Israel had made offerings to it; it was called Nehushtan" (2 Kings 18:4).) In the Pentateuch, Moses creates the brazen serpent in Numbers 21:4–9. Meindert Dijkstra writes that while the historicity of the Mosaic origin of the Nehushtan is unlikely, its association with Moses appears genuine rather than the work of a later redactor. Mark Walter Bartusch notes that the nehushtan is not mentioned at any prior point in Kings, and suggests that the brazen serpent was brought to Jerusalem from the Northern Kingdom after its destruction in 722 BCE.

=== Composition of the Torah narrative ===
The revelation of God on Sinai appears to have originally been a tradition unrelated to the Exodus. Joel S. Baden notes that "[t]he seams [between the Exodus and Wilderness traditions] still show: in the narrative of Israel's rescue from Egypt there is little hint that they will be brought anywhere other than Canaan – yet they find themselves heading first, unexpectedly, and in no obvious geographical order, to an obscure mountain." In addition, there is widespread agreement that the revelation of the law in Deuteronomy was originally separate from the Exodus: the original version of Deuteronomy is generally dated to the 7th century BCE. The contents of the books of Leviticus and Numbers are late additions to the narrative by priestly sources.

Scholars broadly agree that the publication of the Torah (or of a proto-Pentateuch) took place in the mid-Persian period (the 5th century BCE), echoing a traditional Jewish view which gives Ezra, the leader of the Jewish community on its return from Babylon, a pivotal role in its promulgation. Many theories have been advanced to explain the composition of the first five books of the Bible, but two have been especially influential. The first of these, Persian Imperial authorisation, advanced by Peter Frei in 1985, is that the Persian authorities required the Jews of Jerusalem to present a single body of law as the price of local autonomy. Frei's theory was demolished at an interdisciplinary symposium held in 2000, but the relationship between the Persian authorities and Jerusalem remains a crucial question. The second theory, associated with Joel P. Weinberg and called the "Citizen-Temple Community", is that the Exodus story was composed to serve the needs of a post-exilic Jewish community organized around the Temple, which acted in effect as a bank for those who belonged to it. The books containing the Exodus story served as an "identity card" defining who belonged to this community (i.e., to Israel), thus reinforcing Israel's unity through its new institutions.

== Hellenistic Egyptian parallel narratives ==
Writers in Greek and Latin during the Ptolemaic Kingdom (late 4th century BCE – late 1st century BCE) record several Egyptian tales of the expulsion of a group of foreigners connected to the Exodus. These tales often include elements of the Second Intermediate Period ("Hyksos period") and most are extremely anti-Jewish.

The earliest non-biblical account is that of Hecataeus of Abdera (c. 320 BCE) as preserved in the first century CE Jewish historian Josephus in Against Apion and in a variant version by the first-century BCE Greek historian Diodorus. Hecataeus tells how the Egyptians blamed a plague on foreigners and expelled them from the country, whereupon Moses, their leader, took them to Canaan. In this version, Moses is portrayed extremely positively.

Manetho, also preserved in Josephus's Against Apion, tells how 80,000 lepers and other "impure people", led by a priest named Osarseph, join forces with the former Hyksos, now living in Jerusalem, to take over Egypt. They wreak havoc until the Pharaoh and his son chase them out to the borders of Syria, where Osarseph gives the lepers a law code and changes his name to Moses. The identification of Osarseph with Moses in Manetho's account may be an interpolation or may come from Manetho.

Other versions of the story are recorded by the first-century BCE Egyptian grammarian Lysimachus of Alexandria, who set the story in the time of Pharaoh Bakenranef (Bocchoris), the first-century CE Egyptian historian Chaeremon of Alexandria, and the first-century BCE Gallo-Roman historian Gnaeus Pompeius Trogus. The first-century CE Roman historian Tacitus included a version of the story that claims that the Hebrews worshipped a donkey as their god to ridicule Egyptian religion, whereas the Roman biographer Plutarch claimed that the Egyptian god Seth was expelled from Egypt and had two sons named Juda and Hierosolyma.

The stories may represent a polemical Egyptian response to the Exodus narrative. Egyptologist Jan Assmann proposed that the story comes from oral sources that "must [...] predate the first possible acquaintance of an Egyptian writer with the Hebrew Bible." Assmann suggested that the story has no single origin but rather combines numerous historical experiences, notably the Amarna and Hyksos periods, into a folk memory.

There is general agreement that the stories originally had nothing to do with the Jews. Erich S. Gruen suggested that it may have been the Jews themselves that inserted themselves into Manetho's narrative, in which various negative actions from the point of view of the Egyptians, such as desecrating temples, are interpreted positively.

== Religious and cultural significance ==
=== In Judaism ===
Commemoration of the Exodus is central to Judaism, and Jewish culture. In the Bible, the Exodus is frequently mentioned as the event that created the Israelite people and forged their bond with God, being described as such by the prophets Hosea, Jeremiah, and Ezekiel. The Exodus is invoked daily in Jewish prayers and celebrated each year during the Jewish holidays of Passover, Shavuot, and Sukkot. The fringes worn at the corners of traditional Jewish prayer shawls are described as a physical reminder of the obligation to observe the laws given at the climax of Exodus: "Look at it and recall all the commandments of the Lord" (Numbers). The festivals associated with the Exodus began as agricultural and seasonal feasts but became completely subsumed into the Exodus narrative of Israel's deliverance from oppression at the hands of God.

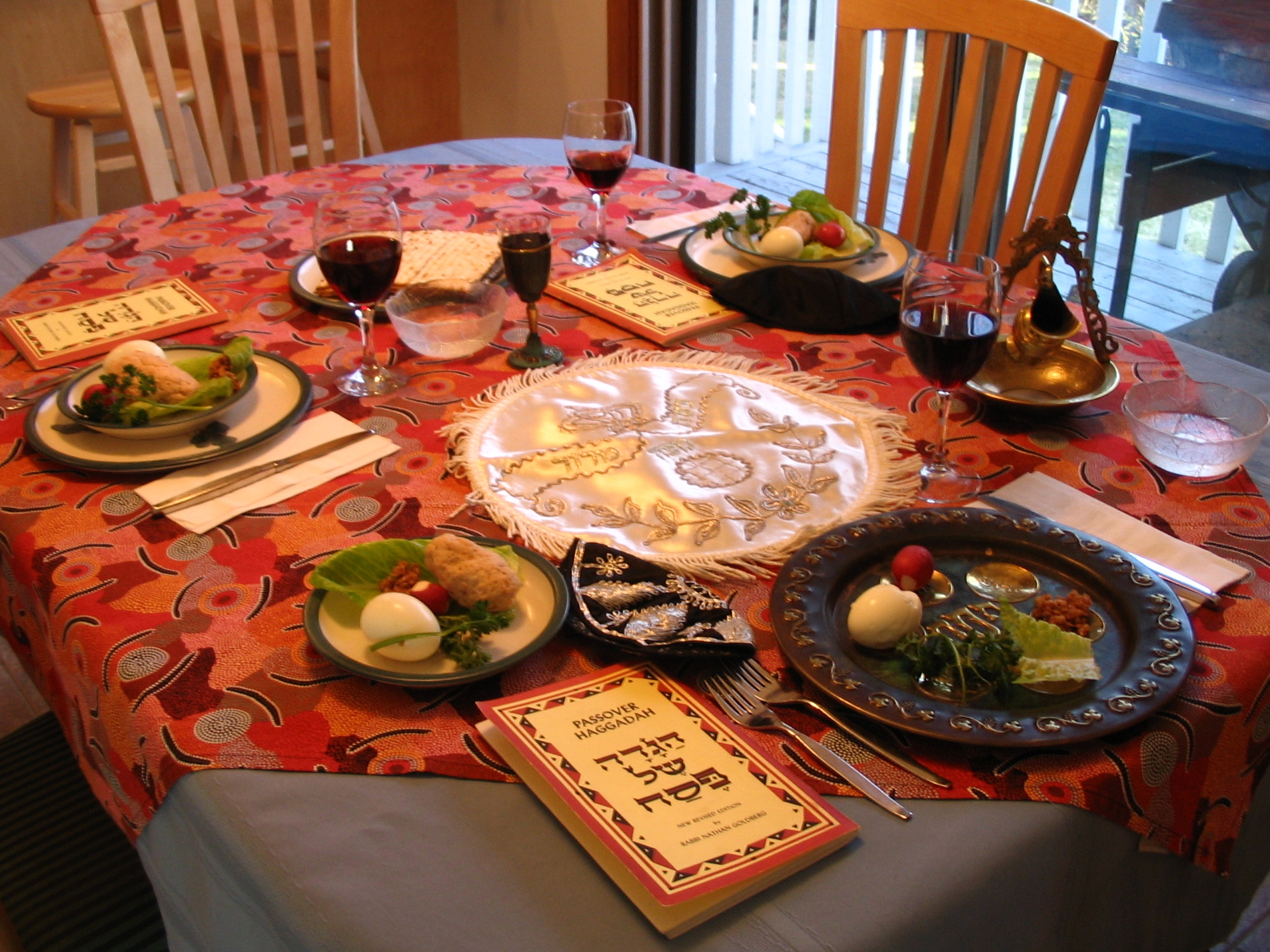
A Seder table setting, commemorating the Passover and Exodus

For Jews, the Passover celebrates the freedom of the Israelites from captivity in Egypt, the settling of Canaan by the Israelites, and the "passing over" of the angel of death during the death of the first-born. Passover involves a ritual meal called a Seder during which parts of the exodus narrative are retold. In the Hagaddah of the Seder it is written that every generation is obliged to remind and identify itself in terms of the Exodus. Thus the following words from the Pesaḥim (10:5) are recited: "In every generation a person is duty-bound to regard himself as if he personally has gone forth from Egypt." (Note: "In every generation a person is duty-bound to regard himself as if he personally has gone forth from Egypt, since it is said 'And you shall tell your son in that day saying, it is because of that which the Lord did for me when I came forth out of Egypt." —Exodus 13:8) Because the Israelites fled Egypt in haste without time for bread to rise, the unleavened bread matzoh is eaten on Passover, and homes must be cleansed of any items containing leavening agents, known as Chametz.

Shavuot celebrates the granting of the Law to Moses on Mount Sinai; Jews are called to rededicate themselves to the covenant on this day. Some denominations follow Shavuot with The Three Weeks, during which the "two most heinous sins committed by the Jews in their relationship to God" are mourned: the Golden Calf and the doubting of God's promise by the Twelve Spies. A third Jewish festival, Sukkot, the Festival of Booths, is associated with the Israelites living in booths after they left their previous homes in Egypt. It celebrates how God provided for the Israelites while they wandered in the desert without food or shelter. It is celebrated by building a sukkah, a temporary shelter also called a booth or tabernacle, in which the rituals of Sukkot are performed, recalling the impermanence of the Israelites' homes during the desert wanderings.

=== In Christianity ===
The Christian Gospels place the Last Supper at Passover, and the Christian ritual of the eucharist and the holiday of Easter draw directly on the imagery of the Passover and the Exodus. In the New Testament, Jesus is frequently associated with motifs of the Exodus. The Gospel of Mark has been suggested to be a midrash on the Exodus, though the scholar Larry J. Perkins thinks this unlikely. Mark suggests that the outpouring of Jesus' blood creates a new covenant (Mark 14:24) in the same way that Moses' sacrifice of bulls had created a covenant (Exodus 24:5). In the Gospel of Matthew, Jesus reverses the direction of the Exodus by escaping from the Massacre of the Innocents committed by Herod the Great before himself returning from Egypt (Matt 2:13–15). Other parallels in Matthew include that he is baptized by water (Matt 3:13–17), and tested in the desert; unlike the Israelites, he is able to resist temptation (Matt. 4.1–3). The Gospel of John repeatedly calls Jesus the Passover lamb (John 1:29, 13:1, 19:36), something also found in 1 Peter (1 Pet 1:18–20), and 1 Corinthians (1 Cor 5:7-8). Biblical scholar Michael Graves calls Paul's discussion of the exodus in 1 Corinthians 5:7–8 and his comparison of the early church in Corinth to the Israelites in the desert "[t]he two most significant NT passages touching on the exodus". John also refers to Jesus as manna (John 6:31-5), water flowing from a rock in the desert (John 7:37–9), and as a pillar of fire (John 8:12). Early Christians frequently interpreted actions taken in the Exodus, and sometimes the Exodus as a whole, typologically to prefigure Jesus or actions of Jesus.

In Romans 9:17, Paul interprets the hardened heart of Pharaoh during the Plagues of Egypt as referring to the hardened hearts of the Jews who rejected Christ. Early Christian authors such as Justin Martyr, Irenaeus, and Augustine all emphasized the supersession of the Old Covenant of Moses by the New Covenant of Christ, which was open to all people rather than limited to the Jews.

=== In Islam ===
The story of the Exodus is also recounted in the Quran, in which Moses is one of the most prominent prophets and messengers. He is mentioned 136 times, the most of any individual in the Quran, with him and his life being narrated and recounted more than that of any other prophet.

=== As historical inspiration ===
A number of historical events and situations have been compared to the Exodus. Many early American settlers interpreted their flight from Europe to a new life in America as a new exodus. American "founding fathers" Thomas Jefferson and Benjamin Franklin recommended for the Great Seal of the United States to depict Moses leading the Israelites across the Red Sea. African Americans suffering under slavery and racial oppression interpreted their situation in terms of the Exodus, making it a catalyst for social change. South American liberation theology also takes much inspiration from the Exodus.

== See also ==
- Book of Joshua, the continuation of the narrative in the conquest of Canaan
- Ipuwer Papyrus
- List of films related to the Exodus
- Stations of the Exodus
- Va'eira, Bo (parashah), and Beshalach: Torah portions (parashot) telling the Exodus story
- The Exodus Decoded

== Cited works ==
- Assmann, Jan (2018). The Invention of Religion: Faith and Covenant in the Book of Exodus. Princeton University Press. ISBN 978-1-4008-8923-5.
- Assmann, Jan (2009). Moses the Egyptian: The Memory of Egypt. Harvard University Press. ISBN 978-0-674-02030-6.
- Assmann, Jan (2003). The mind of Egypt: history and meaning in the time of the Pharaohs. Harvard University Press. ISBN 978-0-674-01211-0.
- Baden, Joel S. (2019). The Book of Exodus: A Biography. Princeton and Oxford: Princeton University Press. ISBN 978-0-691-16954-5.
- Bandstra, Barry L. (2008). Reading the Old Testament: Introduction to the Hebrew Bible. Cengage Learning. ISBN 978-0-495-39105-0.
- Barmash, Pamela (2015b). "Out of the Mists of History: The Exaltation of the Exodus in the Bible". In Barmash, Pamela; Nelson, W. David (eds.). Exodus in the Jewish Experience: Echoes and Reverberations. Lexington Books. pp. 1–22. ISBN 978-1-4985-0293-1.
- Bartusch, Mark W. (2003). Understanding Dan: An Exegetical Study of a Biblical City, Tribe, and Ancestor. Sheffield Academic Press.
- Bietak, Manfred (2022). "Ägypten und der Exodus: Ein altes Thema, ein neuer Ansatz". In Wimmer, S. J.; Zwickel, W. (eds.). Ägypten und Altes Testament (in German). Vol. 100. Zaphon. pp. 151–180. ISBN 978-3-96327-062-8.
- Bietak, Manfred (2015). "On the Historicity of the Exodus: What Egyptology Today Can Contribute to Assessing the Biblical Account of the Sojourn in Egypt". In Thomas E. Levy; Thomas Schneider; William H.C. Propp (eds.). Israel's Exodus in Transdisciplinary Perspective: Text, Archaeology, Culture, and Geoscience. Springer. pp. 17–37. ISBN 978-3-319-04768-3.
- Black, Kathy; et al. (2018). "The Jewish Year". Rhythms of Religious Ritual: The Yearly Cycles of Jews, Christians, and Muslims. Vol. 1. Claremont Press. pp. 9–74. doi:10.2307/j.ctvwrm4gj.6. ISBN 978-1-946230-15-7. JSTOR j.ctvwrm4gj.6. S2CID 160440464.
- Brenner, Martin L. (2012). The Song of the Sea: Ex 15:1 – 21. Walter de Gruyter. ISBN 978-3-110-86722-0.
- Collins, John J. (2005). The Bible After Babel: Historical Criticism in a Postmodern Age. Eerdmans. p. 45. ISBN 978-0-8028-2892-7.
- Coomber, Matthew J.M. (2012). "Before Crossing the Jordan". In Brenner, Athalya; Yee, Gale A. (eds.). Exodus and Deuteronomy. Fortress Press. ISBN 978-1-4514-0819-5.
- Davies, Graham (2004). "Was There an Exodus?". In Day, John (ed.). In Search of Pre-exilic Israel: Proceedings of the Oxford Old Testament Seminar. Continuum. pp. 23–40. ISBN 978-0-567-08206-0.
- Davies, Philip R. (2015). In Search of 'Ancient Israel': A Study in Biblical Origins. Bloomsbury Publishing. ISBN 978-0-567-66299-6.
- Dever, William (2001). What Did the Biblical Writers Know, and When Did They Know It?. Eerdmans. ISBN 978-0-8028-2126-3.
- Dever, William (2003). Who Were the Early Israelites and Where Did They Come From?. Eerdmans. ISBN 978-0-8028-4416-3.
- Dijkstra, Meindert (2006). "Moses, the Man of God". In Roukema, Riemer; Peerbolte, Bert Jan Lietaert; Houtman, Cees (eds.). The interpretation of Exodus studies in honour of Cornelis Houtman. Leuven: Peeters. pp. 17–26. ISBN 978-90-429-1806-1.
- Douglas, Mary (1993). "The Glorious Book of Numbers". Jewish Studies Quarterly. 1 (3): 193–216. JSTOR 40753099.
- Droge, Arthur J. (1996). "Josephus Between Greeks and Barbarians". In Feldman, L.H.; Levison, J.R. (eds.). Josephus' Contra Apion. Brill. ISBN 978-90-04-10325-2.
- Dozeman, Thomas B.; Shectman, Sarah (2016). "Exodus". In Yee, Gale A.; Page, Hugh R. Jr.; Coomber, Matthew J. M. (eds.). The Pentateuch: Fortress Commentary on the Bible Study Edition. Fortress Press. pp. 137–178. doi:10.2307/j.ctt1b3t6qt.11. ISBN 978-1-5064-1442-3. JSTOR j.ctt1b3t6qt.11.
- Eskenazi, Tamara Cohn (2009). "From Exile and Restoration to Exile and Reconstruction". In Grabbe, Lester L.; Knoppers, Gary N. (eds.). Exile and Restoration Revisited: Essays on the Babylonian and Persian Periods. Bloomsbury. ISBN 978-0-567-46567-2.
- Faust, Avraham (2015). "The Emergence of Iron Age Israel: On Origins and Habitus". In Thomas E. Levy; Thomas Schneider; William H.C. Propp (eds.). Israel's Exodus in Transdisciplinary Perspective: Text, Archaeology, Culture, and Geoscience. Springer. ISBN 978-3-319-04768-3.
- Feldman, Louis H. (1998). Josephus's Interpretation of the Bible. University of California Press. ISBN 978-0-520-20853-7.
- Finkelstein, Israel (2015). "The Wilderness Narrative and Itineraries and the Evolution of the Exodus Tradition". In Levy, Thomas E.; Schneider, Thomas; Propp, William H. C. (eds.). Israel's Exodus in Transdisciplinary Perspective: Text, Archaeology, Culture, and Geoscience. Springer. pp. 39–54. ISBN 978-3-319-04768-3.
- Gmirkin, Russell E. (2006). Berossus and Genesis, Manetho and Exodus: Hellenistic Histories and The Date of the Pentateuch. T & T Clark International. ISBN 978-0-567-02592-0.
- Grabbe, Lester (2014). "Exodus and History". In Dozeman, Thomas; Evans, Craig A.; Lohr, Joel N. (eds.). The Book of Exodus: Composition, Reception, and Interpretation. BRILL. pp. 61–87. ISBN 978-90-04-28266-7.
- Grabbe, Lester (2017). Ancient Israel: What Do We Know and How Do We Know It?. Bloomsbury. ISBN 978-0-567-67043-4.
- Graves, Michael (2019). "Exodus". In Blouwers, Paul M.; Martens, Peter W. (eds.). The Oxford Handbook of Early Christian Biblical Interpretation. Oxford University Press. pp. 547–560. ISBN 978-0-19-102820-5.
- Gruen, Erich S. (2016). "The Use and Abuse of the Exodus Story". The Construct of Identity in Hellenistic Judaism: Essays on Early Jewish Literature and History. de Gruyter. pp. 197–228. JSTOR j.ctvbkjxph.14.
- Klein, Isaac (1979). A Guide to Jewish Religious Practice. KTAV Publishing House. ISBN 978-0-873-34004-5.
- Lemche, Niels Peter (1985). Early Israel: Anthropological and Historical studies. Brill. ISBN 978-90-04-07853-6.
- Meyers, Carol (2005). Exodus. Cambridge University Press. ISBN 978-0-521-00291-2.
- Cross, Frank Moore (1997). Canaanite Myth and Hebrew Epic. Harvard University Press. ISBN 978-0-674-09176-4.
- Moore, Megan Bishop; Kelle, Brad E. (2011). Biblical History and Israel's Past: The Changing Study of the Bible and History. Eerdmans. ISBN 978-0-8028-6260-0.
- Nelson, W. David (2015). "Discontinuity and Dissonance: Torah, Textuality, and Early Rabbinic Hermeneutics of Exodus". In Barmash, Pamela; Nelson, W. David (eds.). Exodus in the Jewish Experience: Echoes and Reverberations. Lexington Books. pp. 23–51. ISBN 978-1-4985-0293-1.
- Na'aman, Nadav (2011). "The Exodus Story: Between Historical Memory and Historiographical Composition". Journal of Ancient Near Eastern Religions. 11: 39–69. doi:10.1163/156921211X579579.
- Neusner, Jacob (2005). The Talmud: Law, Theology, Narrative : a Sourcebook. University Press of America. ISBN 978-0-761-83115-0.
- Perkins, Larry (2006). "Kingdom, Messianic Authority, and the Re-Constituting of God's People: Tracing the Function of Exodus Material in Mark's Narrative". In Hatina, Thomas R. (ed.). Biblical Interpretation in Early Christian Gospels, volume 1: The Gospel of Mark. T & T Clark. pp. 100–115. ISBN 978-0-567-38142-2.
- Pietersma, Albert; Wright, Benjamin, eds. (2014). "New English Translation of the Septuagint: Electronic Version". Oxford University Press.
- Redford, Donald B. (1992). Egypt, Canaan, and Israel in Ancient Times. Princeton University Press. ISBN 978-0-691-03606-9.
- Redmount, Carol A. (2001) [1998]. "Bitter Lives: Israel In And Out of Egypt". In Coogan, Michael D. (ed.). The Oxford History of the Biblical World. Oxford University Press. pp. 58–89. ISBN 978-0-19-988148-2.
- Romer, Thomas (2008). "Moses Outside the Torah and the Construction of a Diaspora Identity" (PDF). Journal of Hebrew Scriptures. 8, article 15: 2–12. Archived from the original (PDF) on 2020-10-21.
- Russell, Brian D. (2007). The Song of the Sea: The Date of Composition and Influence of Exodus 15:1-21. Peter Lang. ISBN 978-0-820-48809-7.
- Russell, Stephen C. (2009). Images of Egypt in Early Biblical Literature. Walter de Gruyter. ISBN 978-3-11-022171-8.
- Sarason, Richard S. (2015). "The Past as Paradigm:Enactments of the Exodus Motif in Jewish Liturgy". In Barmash, Pamela; Nelson, W. David (eds.). Exodus in the Jewish Experience: Echoes and Reverberations. Lexington. ISBN 978-1-4985-0293-1.
- Shaw, Ian (2002). "Israel, Israelites". In Shaw, Ian; Jameson, Robert (eds.). A Dictionary of Archaeology. Wiley Blackwell. p. 313. ISBN 978-0-631-23583-5.
- Ska, Jean Louis (2006). Introduction to Reading the Pentateuch. Eisenbrauns. ISBN 978-1-57506-122-1.
- Sparks, Kenton L. (2010). "Genre Criticism". In Dozeman, Thomas B. (ed.). Methods for Exodus. Cambridge University Press. ISBN 978-1-139-48738-2.
- Tigay, Jeffrey H. (2004). "Exodus". In Berlin, Adele; Brettler, Marc Zvi (eds.). The Jewish Study Bible. Oxford University Press. ISBN 978-0-19-529751-5.
- Viviano, Pauline (2019). "Do the Books of Hosea and Jeremiah Know of a Sinai/Horeb Golden Calf Story". In Mason, Eric F.; Lupieri, Edmondo F. (eds.). Golden Calf Traditions in Early Judaism, Christianity, and Islam. Brill. pp. 36–48.
