= Meeting place =

A meeting place is a location where some form of gathering may occur.

Meeting Place or The Meeting Place may also refer to:

== Buildings and structures ==
- The Meeting Place (church) in Winnipeg, Manitoba
- The Meeting Place (sculpture) in St Pancras railway station, London
- The Meeting Place in the Andrews Building, University of Toronto Scarborough

== Music and Songs ==
- "The Meeting Place" (song), a 1986 song by XTC
- "Meeting Place", by The Last Shadow Puppets from the album The Age of the Understatement

== See also ==
- Meeting
- The Meeting Place Cannot Be Changed, a 1979 Soviet television miniseries
- Meeting Point, a liberal political organisation and party in Hong Kong
- The Meeting Point, a 1989 Yugoslavian fantasy/comedy-drama film
