= Fresno Pacific Biblical Seminary =

Coordinates: 36.7277°N 119.7353°W

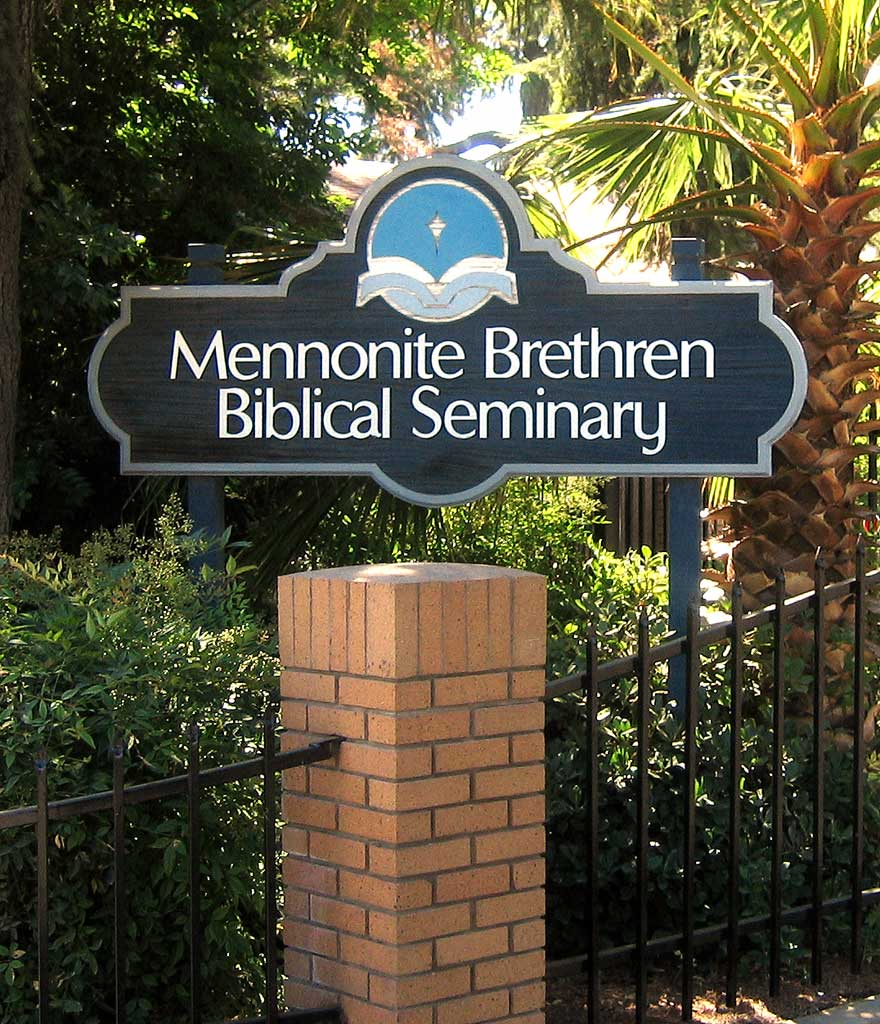

Fresno Pacific University Biblical Seminary, formerly the Mennonite Brethren Biblical Seminary, is the denominational seminary of the United States Mennonite Brethren Churches. It was founded in 1955 in Fresno, California. The campus is located on the campus of Fresno Pacific University in southeast Fresno.

The seminary is a member of the Associated Canadian Theological Schools and is accredited by the Western Association of Schools and Colleges and the Association of Theological Schools in the United States and Canada and offers Master of Divinity and Master of Arts degrees in various ministry and bible-related subjects. It also offers several graduate-level diploma and certificate courses.

== See also ==
- U.S. Conference of Mennonite Brethren Churches
- Canadian Conference of Mennonite Brethren Churches
