= MBCI =

MBCI may refer to:

- Mennonite Brethren Collegiate Institute
- Mississippi Band of Choctaw Indians
