= Quebec School of Evangelical Theology =

Bible college in Montreal, Canada

Coordinates: 45°29′42″N 73°36′47″W

École de théologie évangélique du Québec
- Type: Private Christian interdenominational degree granting institution
- Academic affiliations: Université Laval
- Location: Montreal, Quebec, Canada
- Campus: urban
- Website: www.etem.ca

The Quebec School of Evangelical Theology (French: École de théologie évangélique du Québec) (ETEQ) is an interdenominational Evangelical bible college in Montreal, Canada.

== History ==
The school has its origins in the Institut Biblique VIE, founded in May 1999 in Quebec City by the Christian and Missionary Alliance of Canada. The committee wanted to be innovative, and give students a chance to put what they learn into practice, and involve the local church in their own leaders' training rather than taking them out of the church for several years. The local church shows its support for its students by providing a ministry of mentorship and financial aid. The Montreal headquarters opened in the summer of 2004, in partnership with the École de Théologie Évangélique de Montréal (Canadian Conference of Mennonite Brethren Churches) for a united bible college.

The emphasis is on spiritual disciplines to deepen our spiritual lives, learning to self-evaluate, developing a teamwork mindset, and constantly growing as we go through the pilgrimage of life. The principles learned are always applied to the student's individual church work. In 2013, an agreement for transfer credits is concluded with the Université Laval Faculty of Theology. In April 2016, the Institute changed its name to École de théologie évangélique du Québec.
