= Larry J. Perkins =

- Born: Larry James Perkins; 25 March 1948
- Education: Doctor of Philosophy
- Alma mater: University of Toronto
- Employer: Trinity Western University
- Awards: The John William Wevers Prize in Septuagint Studies
- Position held: dean (Trinity Western University, 1989–1990), dean (Associated Canadian Theological Schools, 1996–2004)

Larry James Perkins (1948) is a Canadian professor emeritus of Biblical Studies at Northwest Centre for Biblical of the Northwest Baptist Seminary and the Associated Canadian Theological Schools of the Trinity Western University. He is President Emeritus of Northwest Baptist Seminary.

== Life ==
Perkins is married to Judy and they have four children and eleven grandchildren.

=== Education ===
In 1970 Perkins earned a B.A.(Hon.) in Classical Studies at the University of British Columbia. From 1972 he holds a B.A. in theology at the University of Oxford. In 1974 Perkins earned a M.A. in Near Eastern Studies at the University of Toronto. From 1978 he also earned a M.A. at the University of Oxford. From 1980 Perkins holds a PhD in Hebrew, Aramaic/Syriac and Hellenistic Greek (Religious) Language and Literature at the University of Toronto with the doctoral dissertation The place of the Syro-Hexapla in the textual tradition of the Septuagint of Deuteronomy. In 1985 Perkins earned a M.Ed. in Higher Education Administration at the University of British Columbia.

=== Career ===
Perkins is director emeritus of NBS’ Korean Language Programs division and he is one of the founding members of the John William Wevers Institute for Septuagint Studies. Perkins has served as Dean and President of NBS, as well as Dean of Associated Canadian Theological Schools (ACTS), the Graduate School of Theological Studies for Trinity Western University. Perkins is member of the Society of Biblical Literature and the International Organization for Septuagint and Cognate Studies (IOSCS).

=== Teaching ===
From 1978 to 1985 Perkins was an assistant Professor and from 1985 to 1987 an associate professor of Biblical Studiesat Northwest Baptist Theological College. From 1987 to 2015 he become professor of Biblical Studies of New Testament at the Northwest Baptist Seminary, ACTS Seminaries. From 2011 he is President Emeritus at the Northwest Baptist Seminary. From 2015 Perkins is emeritus Professor of Biblical Studies at the Northwest Baptist Seminary/ACTS Seminaries.

From 1980 to 1999 Perkins was Academic Dean at Northwest Baptist Theological College (Northwest Baptist Seminary). From 1996 to the 2004 Perkins is Academic Dean at the ACTS Seminaries.

== Awards ==
- The John William Wevers Prize in Septuagint Studies.

== Works ==
=== Thesis ===
- Perkins, Larry James (1981). The place of the Syro-Hexapla in the textual tradition of the Septuagint of Deuteronomy (PhD diss. University of Toronto). Ottawa: National Library of Canada. OCLC 15887421.

=== Books ===
- Perkins, Larry James (2017). The Pastoral Letters: A handbook on the Greek text. Baylor University Press. ISBN 9781481300391.

== Sources ==
- Hatina, Thomas R., ed. (2006). Biblical Interpretation in Early Christian Gospels Volume 1: The Gospel of Mark. The Library of New Testament Studies. Vol. 304. Bloomsbury Publishing. ISBN 9780567381422.
- NBS. "About Dr. Perkins". Northwest Baptist Seminary.
- NIMER. "Larry J. Perkins, PhD". Northwest Institute for Ministry Education Research.
- TWU. "Larry Perkins, Ph.D." Trinity Western University.
- ACTS. "Larry J. Perkins".
- BRLC. "The Story". Bible Reading League of Canada.
- NSC. "Larry Perkins, Ph.D. Emeritus Professor of Biblical Studies. Emeritus President". Northwest Seminary College.
