= The Meeting Place (church) =

Coordinates: 49.8893°N 97.1392°W

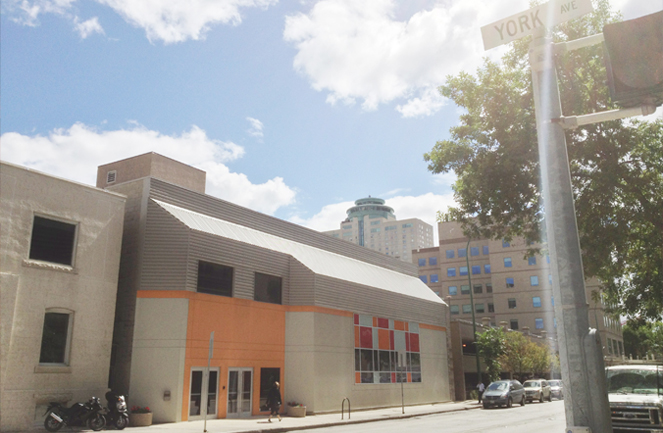
- The front of The Meeting Place
- The Meeting Place
- Location: Winnipeg, Manitoba
- Country: Canada
- Language: English
- Denomination: Mennonite Brethren, Anabaptism
- Website: themeetingplace.mb.ca

History
- Founded: 1991

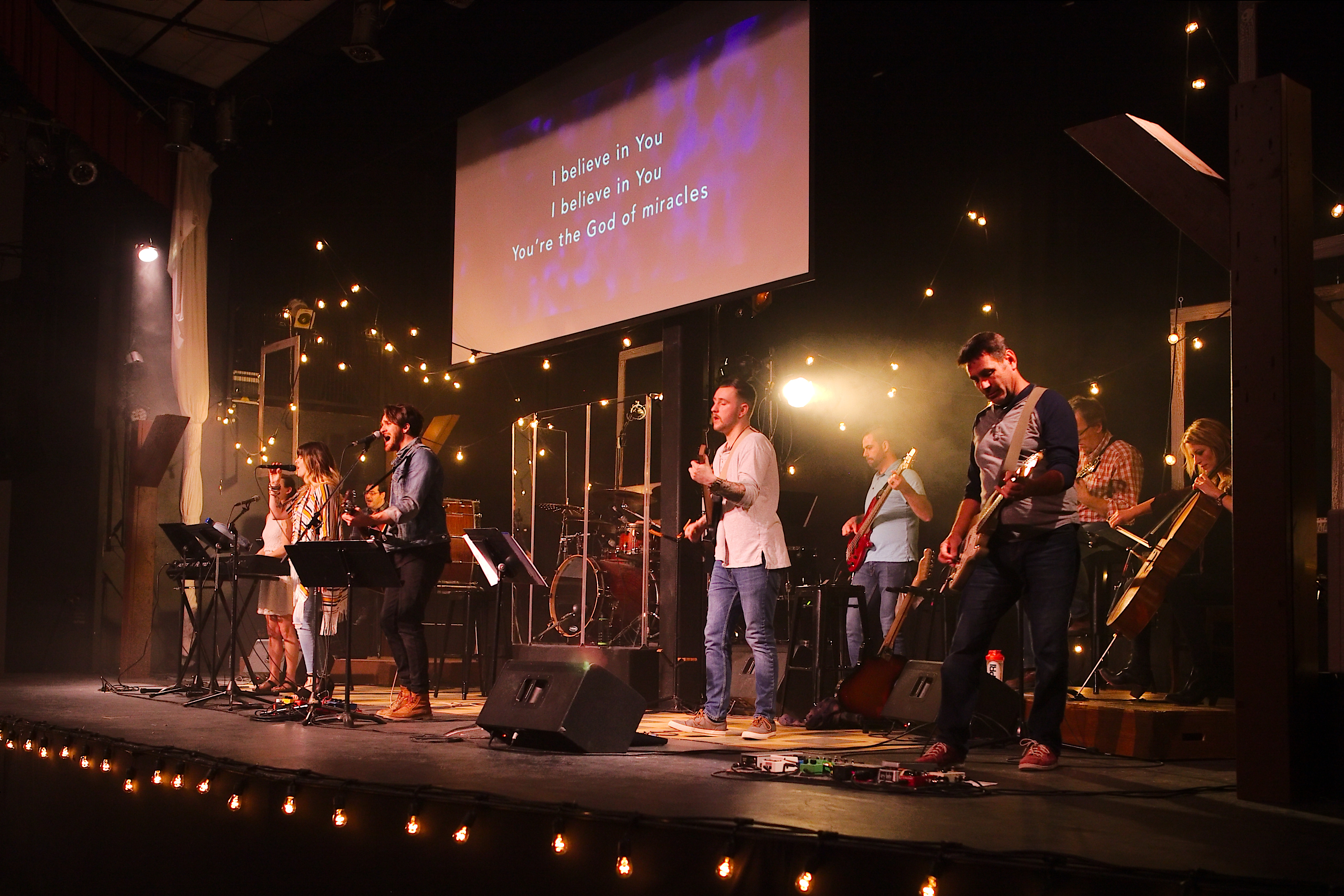
The Meeting Place's 2018 Easter service

The Meeting Place (TMP) is an evangelical Mennonite church located in downtown Winnipeg, Manitoba. It is a member of the Canadian Conference of Mennonite Brethren Churches and the Mennonite Brethren Church of Manitoba.

== History ==
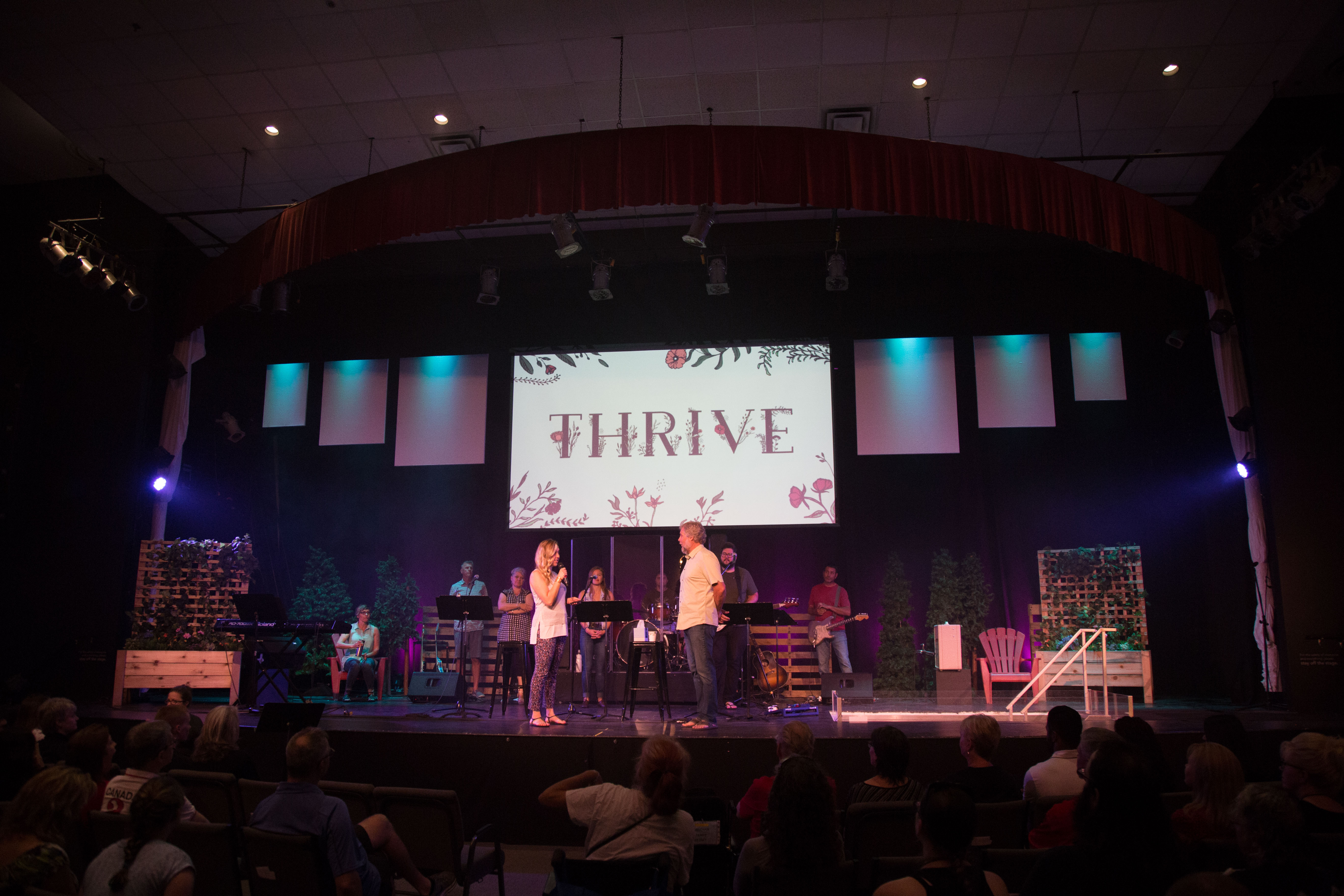
Sunday morning service at The Meeting Place in 2018

A Meeting Place service held in the basement during 1991 renovations

The Meeting Place was founded in 1991 by a small group of former attendees of Portage Avenue Mennonite Brethren Church, as well as a few people from other church backgrounds. The hope was to create a new church with a focus on making a Sunday morning worship experience more comfortable for first-time visitors and offering them identifiable steps and pathways toward greater spiritual growth.

The Meeting Place Church offices located in the lower level of the building, seen here on the left next to the main building

The Meeting Place was originally located in a small office building on Maryland Street prior to moving in 1993 to its current location on Smith Street in what was previously a night club. Church services were held in a temporarily renovated area in the Smith Street building basement while major renovations took place in the soon to be main auditorium. Once the main auditorium began being used for the weekend services, the basement was renovated to accommodate the Children's Ministry program. Subsequent renovations on the top floor have allowed for a theater to be built to accommodate the Youth Ministry programs. In addition, staff offices have been moved around a number of times. Initially these were in the Smith Street building when it was first acquired by the congregation, but were taken out and moved to an office building one block away on Broadway Ave and remained there for a couple of years until once again being relocated to a basement office on Smith Street next door to the main auditorium building.

Over the years, The Meeting Place has seen both increases and declines in attendance. At its peak in the late 90s and into 2000, over 2200 attendees were attending on a weekly basis. Currently, 200 people attend on a weekly basis, with many more people watching regularly online who would call The Meeting Place their home faith community.

The Meeting Place has seen its share of Christian recording artists on staff, most notably Juno Award nominee and Covenant Award winner Jon Buller, and Covenant Award winner Drew Brown. The Meeting Place is also where Christian recording artist and Juno Award winner Amanda Falk was discovered.

In September 2008, John Neufeld became the lead pastor The Meeting Place. He had previously been the head of the Canadian Conference of Mennonite Brethren Churches' Leadership Development department John Neufeld served as the lead pastor for twelve and half years alongside a leadership team and executive pastor Bob Marsch. In May 2021, John resigned as lead pastor and transitioned to become the lead pastor at Eastview Community Church and later the Director of the Manitoba Mennonite Brethren Conference.

Following John Neufeld’s resignation, the Elders of TMP commissioned a search committee to find a new lead pastor and, in the end, appointed long time executive pastor Bob Marsch into the role of lead pastor of TMP in November of 2022.

Under the leadership of Bob Marsch, The Meeting Place experienced significant decline in attendance and staffing. In the spring of 2023, the decision was made to move to one Sunday morning gathering at 10am.

Programming is available for all ages on Sunday mornings. Throughout the week there is programming available for adults, youth, and young adults.
