= Japan Mennonite Brethren Conference =

The Japan Mennonite Brethren Conference, or 日本メノナイトブレザレン教団 Nihon Menonaito Burezaren Kyoudan, is an organization serving the Mennonite Brethren churches of Japan.

Mennonite Brethren in Japan began as a mission work of the Board of Foreign Missions of the General Conference of Mennonite Brethren Churches (now the US Conference of Mennonite Brethren Churches and the Canadian Conference of Mennonite Brethren Churches). Plans for mission work in Japan were initiated in 1948, and the first missionary arrived in August 1950. The Mennonite Brethren mission work centered on the Osaka and Kobe area. Since then over 30 Mennonite Brethren missionaries have served in Japan. The first church service took place in May 1951, and the first baptism was in August of that same year. The work grew and the Nihon Menonaito Burezaren Kyoudan was founded in 1964.

In April 2015 the Japan Mennonite Brethren Conference celebrated the 65th anniversary of its origins. In 2018 the Conference reported 1776 members in 29 congregations.

Services provided by the Japan Mennonite Brethren Conference include theological direction through its Board of Faith and Life, Church Education Ministries, an Evangelism Committee, Overseas Missions Committee, and Publications Committee. The Nosegawa Bible Camp is located in the north part of Osaka, Japan, near the Inagawa River. The Japan Mennonite Brethren Conference operates the Evangelical Biblical Seminary (founded as the Osaka Biblical Seminary in 1965 by the Mennonite Brethren and two Baptist groups) at Ikeda, Osaka. Yoki Otozure is the conference periodical.
