= Associated Canadian Theological Schools =

- Type: Seminary
- Active: 1985–2026
- Dean: Susan Wendel
- Director: Todd Martin
- Students: 505
- Location: Langley, British Columbia, Canada; 49.139018°N 122.601028°W
- Website: www.actsseminaries.com

The Associated Canadian Theological Schools (ACTS Seminaries) was an interdenominational consortium of evangelical Christian seminaries in Canada, embedded as a graduate schools of theology within Trinity Western University. Together, the consortium jointly granted master's and doctoral degrees in biblical studies, theology, ministry, linguistics, chaplaincy and marriage and family therapy. ACTS Seminaries was an accredited member of the Association of Theological Schools.

== History ==
ACTS Seminaries was founded in 1985 by Canadian Baptist Seminary, Northwest Baptist Seminary and Trinity Western University, with the dual mission of providing excellent graduate theological education for students within a Christian university setting, and serving as a place to educate and train leaders for churches. The consortium operated on the TWU campus, allowing the other members to consolidate their previous physical locations. Mennonite Brethren Biblical Seminary joined ACTS Seminaries in 1999.

In March of 2024 ACTS Seminaries announced a transition plan for the consortium to dissolve as Trinity Western University moved to establish its own School of Theology by May 1st, 2026.

In August of 2025 Trinity Western University announced that it would acquire Trinity Evangelical Divinity School (TEDS) as its new school of divinity. ACTS Seminaries dissolved in April of 2026 and TEDS began to operate at TWU later that same year.

== Member institutions ==
The four member schools of ACTS Seminaries were Canadian Baptist Seminary, Mennonite Brethren Biblical Seminary, Northwest Baptist Seminary and Trinity Western University. Alongside the member seminaries, Canada Institute of Linguistics and the Vancouver Institute for Evangelical Worldview worked in affiliation with ACTS Seminaries to provide specialized degree programs. Within ACTS Seminaries and Trinity Western University, The John William Wevers Institute for Septuagint Studies is a research institute that serves as a hub for Septuagint research, translation, and publication projects.
