= Fresno Pacific University =

Christian university in Fresno, California, US

- Former names: Pacific Bible Institute (1944–1964); Pacific College (1964–1976); Fresno Pacific College (1976–1997)
- Motto: Founded on Christ
- Type: Private university
- Established: 1944; 82 years ago
- Accreditation: WSCUC
- Religious affiliation: U.S. Conference of Mennonite Brethren Churches
- President: André Stephens
- Faculty: 200
- Undergraduates: 2,731
- Postgraduates: 1,298
- Location: Fresno, California, United States; 36.7260°N 119.7348°W
- Campus: 42 acres (17 ha), 16 buildings
- Colors: Navy Blue and Orange
- Nickname: Sunbirds www.fpuathletics.com
- Sporting affiliations: Pacific West Conference NCAA Division II (2012–present); NAIA (1986–2012)
- Mascot: Sunbird
- Website: fresno.edu

Fresno Pacific University (FPU) is a private Christian university in Fresno, California, United States. It was founded as the Pacific Bible Institute in 1944 by the Pacific District Conference of U.S. Conference of Mennonite Brethren Churches. The university awarded its first Bachelor of Arts degree in 1965. The first master's degree program was introduced in 1975.

== History ==
At the time of its founding, Pacific Bible Institute was located in a large home at 1095 N. Van Ness Ave. There were five staff members and twenty-eight students. By the time the first school year was finished, a former YWCA building at the corner of Tuolumne and L streets (originally designed by Julia Morgan) had been purchased, and the next school year began in this building.

By 1958, land was purchased for the construction of the current campus near the corner of Butler and Chestnut, along with the Mennonite Brethren Biblical Seminary and the new Butler Avenue Mennonite Brethren Church. Construction began on a new classroom building that year, and two dormitory buildings one year later. The classroom building was ready for use in the fall of 1959, but the dorm buildings were not completed until 1961 because of financial difficulties.

The Bible Institute became an accredited junior college in 1961, and decided to develop a four-year program two years later, in 1963. In 1964, Pacific Bible Institute changed its name to Pacific College, and became accredited with the WASC the next year. By 1967, the decision was made to add graduate courses, and the accreditation for the first master of arts program was received from WASC in 1975. The college changed its name to Fresno Pacific College in 1976 and to Fresno Pacific University in 1997.

In 2010 the Mennonite Brethren Biblical Seminary became a part of the university, and changed its name to Fresno Pacific University Biblical Seminary.

The university was granted an exception to Title IX in 2015 which allows it to legally discriminate against LGBT students. Same-sex sexual activity by students (as well as any heterosexual sexual activity outside of marriage) is a violation of university residential policies. In 2015 then-president Richard Kriegbaum stated that gay marriage was "anti-Christian."

=== Chief executives ===
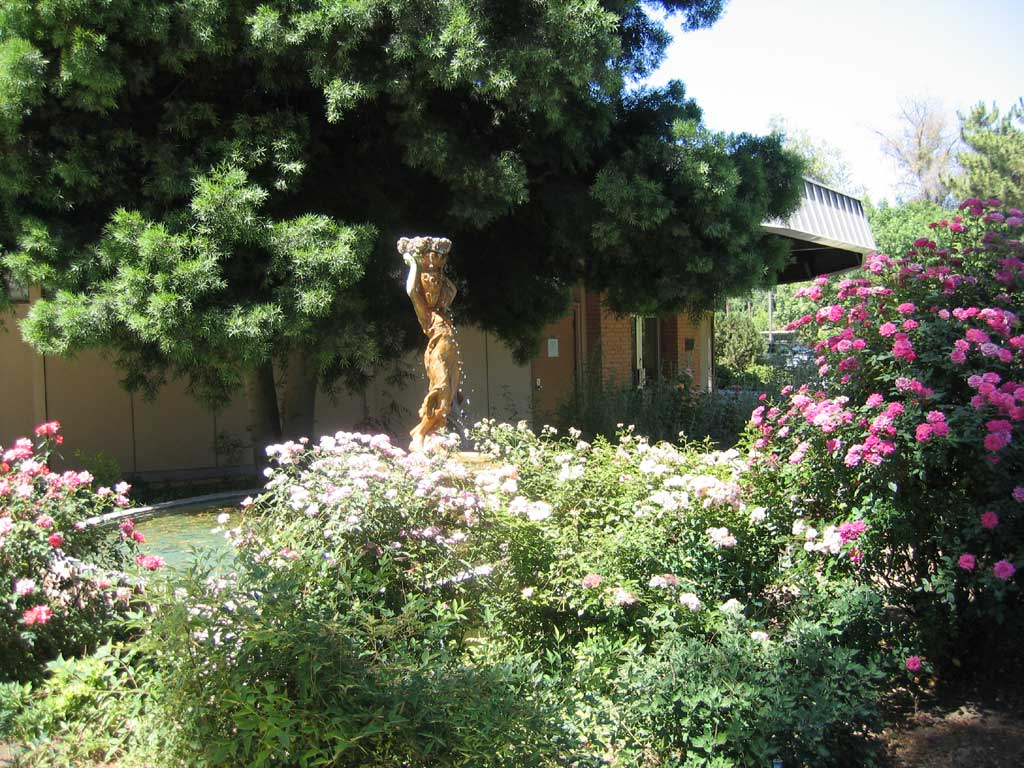
Campus

- 1944–1946 Sam W. Goossen – Acting President/Dean
- 1946–1947 George B. Huebert – Administrator
- 1947–1953 George W. Peters – President/Dean
- 1953–1954 Rueben M. Baerg – Acting President
- 1954–1955 Rueben M. Baerg – Acting President, one-half year; Administrative Committee last half of year, Dr. George W. Peters, Chmn.
- 1955–1960 B.J. Braun – President
- 1960–1961 Arthur J. Wiebe – Director of Pacific Bible Institute; Mr. Joel A. Wiebe – Interim Director
- 1961–1975 Arthur J. Wiebe – President
- 1975–1976 Edmund Janzen, Chairman, Presidential Council
- 1976–1982 Edmund Janzen – President
- 1982–1983 Silas Bartsch – Interim President; Edmund Janzen on leave
- 1983–1985 Edmund Janzen – President
- 1985–1997 Richard Kriegbaum – President
- 1997–2000 Allen Carden – President
- 2000–2002 Harold Haak – President
- 2002–2012 D. Merrill Ewert – President
- 2012–2014 Pete Menjares – President
- 2014–2017 Richard Kriegbaum — President
- 2017–2022 Joseph Jones — President
- 2022−present André Stephens – President

== Academics ==
Fresno Pacific offers bachelor's degrees in more than 40 fields with over 100 areas of study. It also offers advanced degrees or credentials in the fields of Education, Business, Leadership & Organizational Studies, Social Work, Kinesiology, Nursing, Divinity, Ministry, and Marriage & Family Therapy. The university is organized into two schools: The School of Arts & Sciences, and the School of Graduate & Professional Studies. Fresno Pacific is accredited by the WASC Senior College and University Commission.

=== Graduation guarantee ===
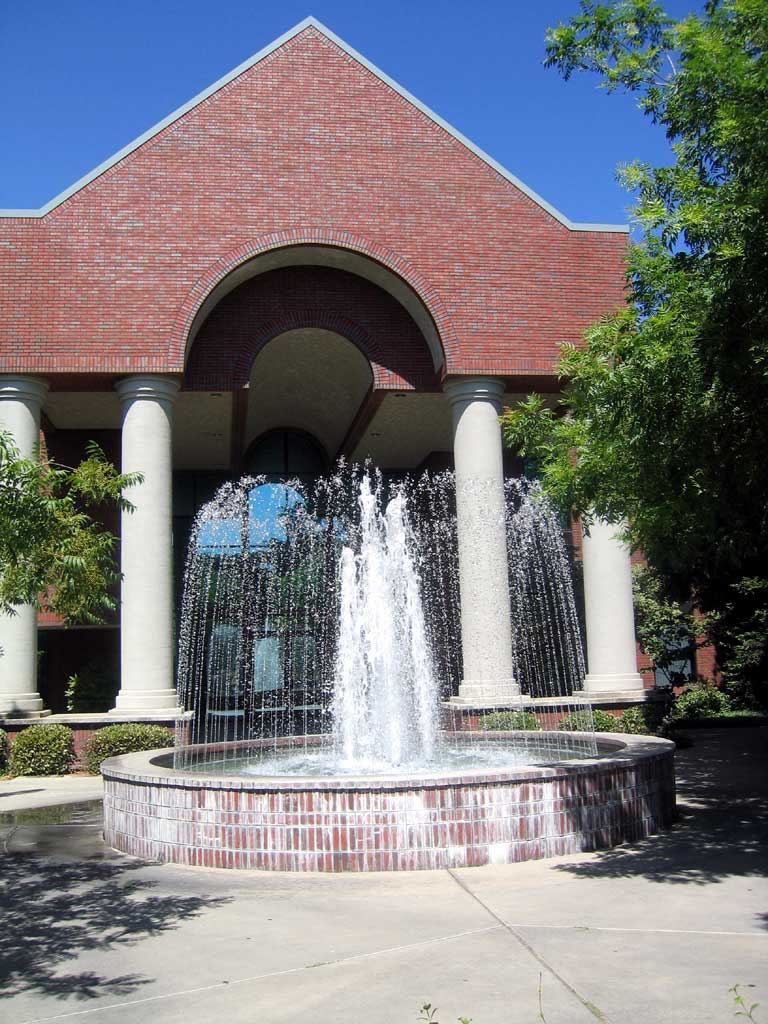
McDonald Hall

In February 2009 Fresno Pacific University began offering a "Four Year Graduation Guarantee." FPU already has the highest four-year graduation rate in the Central Valley, with 60 percent of traditional undergraduate students already graduating in four years, compared to 12–15 percent in the CSU system.

== Campuses ==
Fresno Pacific University's main 50-acre campus is located in the south east area of Fresno, hub of the Central Valley region of California and the fifth largest city in the state.

The university also maintains four regional campuses in Central California:

- Merced Regional Campus
- North Fresno Regional Campus
- Visalia Regional Campus
- Bakersfield Regional Campus

=== Buildings ===
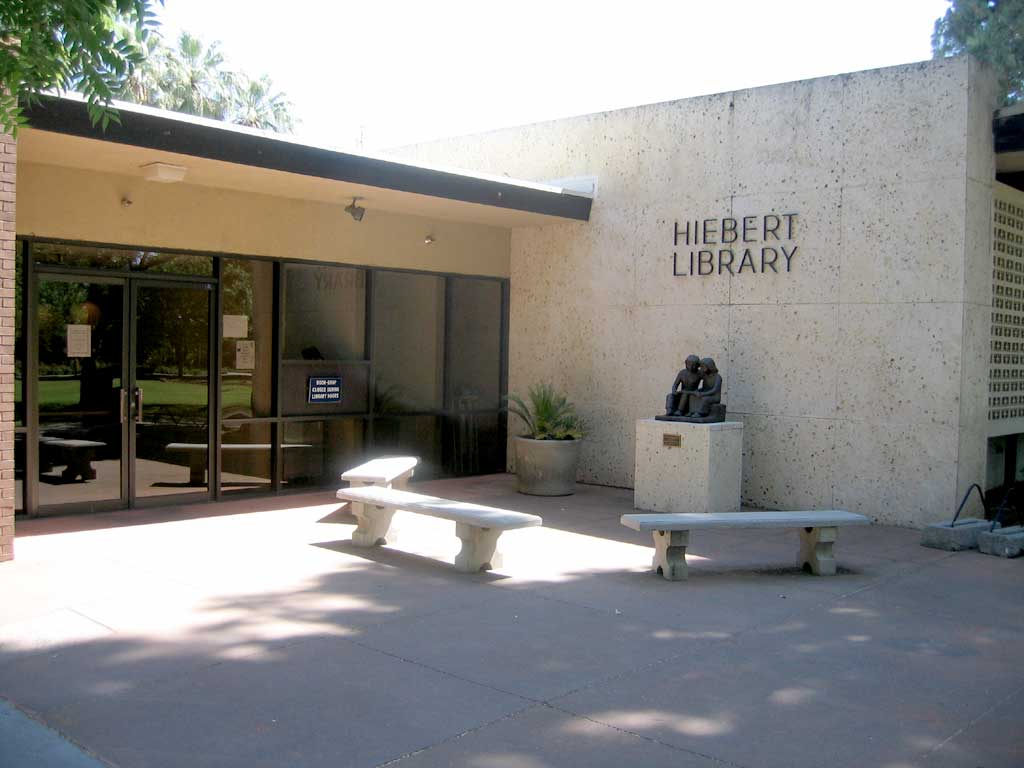
Hiebert Library

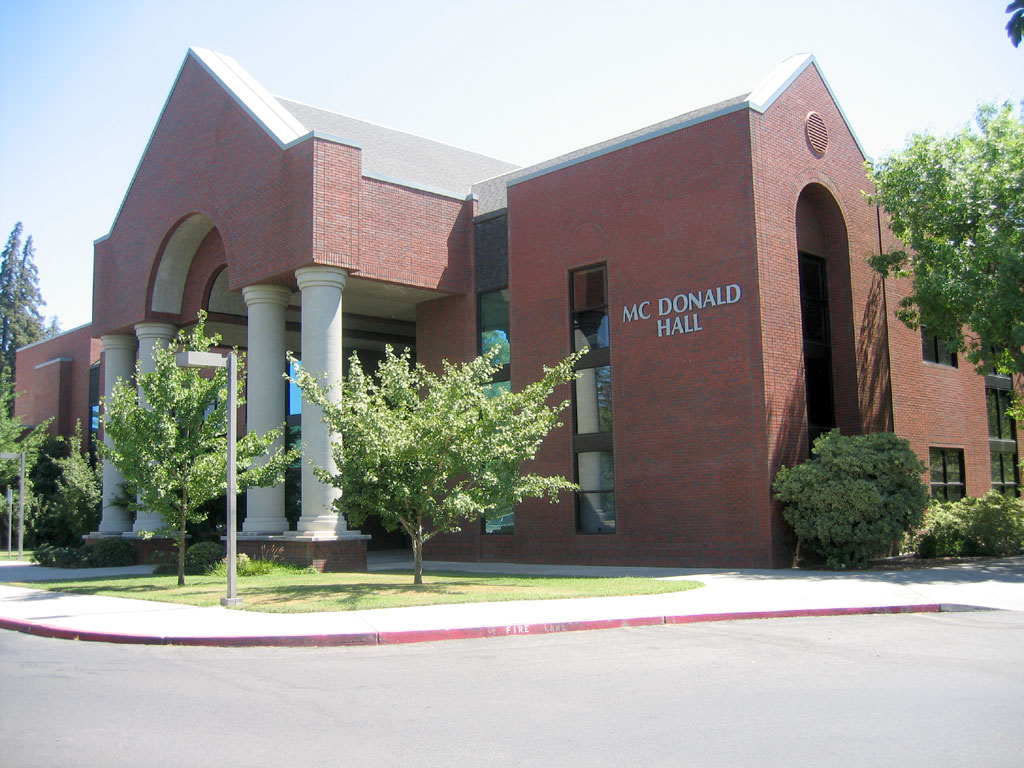
McDonald Hall

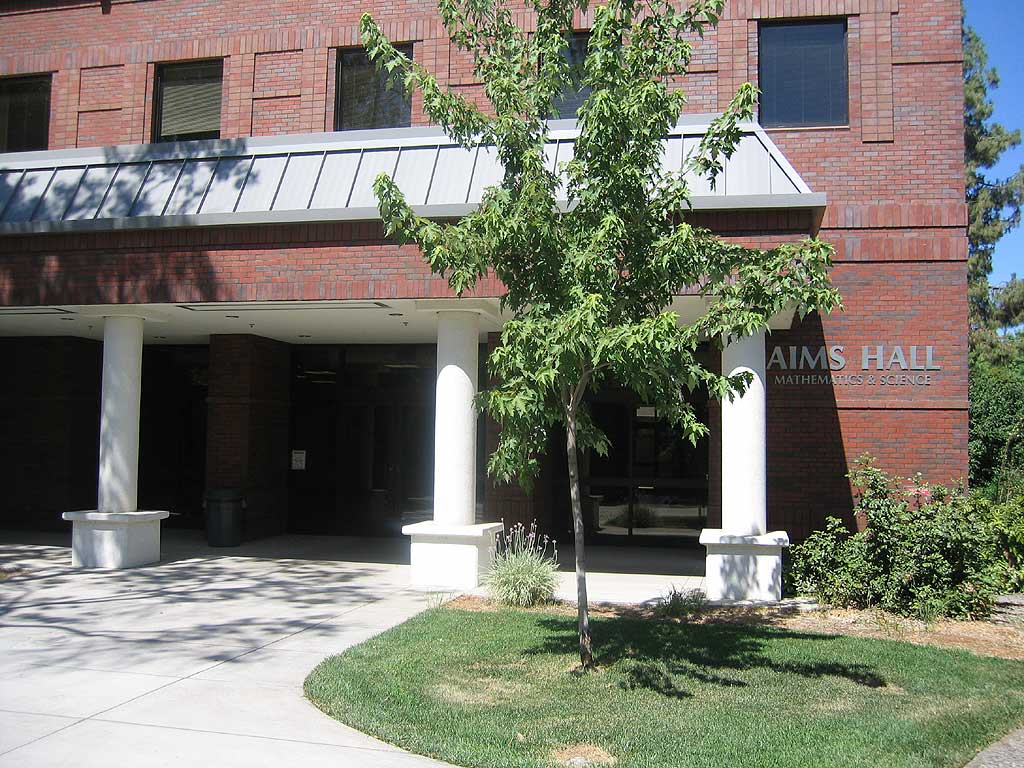
AIMS Hall, Mathematics and Science

Completed	Name	Information
1958	Sattler Hall	Named for early Anabaptist leader Michael Sattler in 1973.
1961	Krause Hall	Named for Arthur and Lydia Krause in 1990. Further units added to in 1962.
1961	Nachtigall Hall	Named for Ben W. and Anna Marie Nachtigall in 1989. Further units added in 1962.
1961	Schlichting Hall	Named for Marvin and Loree Schlichting in 1994. Further units added in 1962.
1961	Warkentine Hall	Named for Al and Dotty Warkentine in 1989. Further units added in 1962.
1962	Hiebert Library	Named for Cornelius and Elizabeth Hiebert, the primary contributors.
1964	Alumni Hall	Building costs were mostly covered by alumni (renovated 2005).
1966	Marpeck Center	Named for early Anabaptist leader Pilgram Marpeck in 1973.
1968	Kriegbaum Hall	Part of Witmarsum Quad, renamed for former college president Richard Kriegbaum.
1968	Witmarsum Quad	Named for the village of Witmarsum, birthplace of Menno Simons, in 1973.
1971	Strasbourg Hall	Named for the city of Strasbourg, where early Anabaptists often sought refuge, in 1973.
1981	Special Events Center	
1986	Bartsch Hall	Named for Silas Bartsch and his wife Nadine Bartsch. Silas was an administrator and former interim president. The building was an existing residence which was purchased and remodeled.
1990	Wiebe Education Center	Named for Arthur and Evelyn Wiebe. Arthur was a former president and member of the faculty, as well as the president of the AIMS Foundation, which provided a large portion of the funding.
1992	McDonald Hall	Named for Arthur and Barbara McDonald, contributors and co-chairs of the fundraising campaign.
1998	Jost Hall	Formerly known as East Hall, changed in 2017 to current name.
2002	AIMS Hall	Named for The AIMS Foundation, which provided a large portion of the funding by means of a grant.
2003	Steinert Campus Center	Named for Marvin and Nadine Steinert, primary contributors.
2010	Seminary House	Previously the administration building of Mennonite Brethren Biblical Seminary, which became a part of the university in 2010.
2010	North Hall	Previously a classroom, student center, and office building of Mennonite Brethren Biblical Seminary.
2022	Warkentine Culture and Arts Center	Named for Al & Dotty Warkentine, primary contributors.

== Athletics ==
The Fresno Pacific athletic teams are called the Sunbirds. The university is a member of the Division II level of the National Collegiate Athletic Association (NCAA), primarily competing in the Pacific West Conference (PacWest) for most of its sports since the 2012–13 academic year. while its men's and women's water polo teams compete in the Western Water Polo Association (WWPA). The Sunbirds previously competed in the Golden State Athletic Conference (GSAC) of the National Association of Intercollegiate Athletics (NAIA) from 1986–87 to 2011–12.

Fresno Pacific competes in 17 intercollegiate varsity sports: Men's sports include baseball, basketball, cross country, soccer, swimming, tennis, track & field and water polo; while women's sports include basketball, cheerleading, cross country, soccer, swimming, tennis, track & field, volleyball and water polo.

=== Mascot ===
The athletics mascot is Sunny the Sunbird.

== Traditions ==
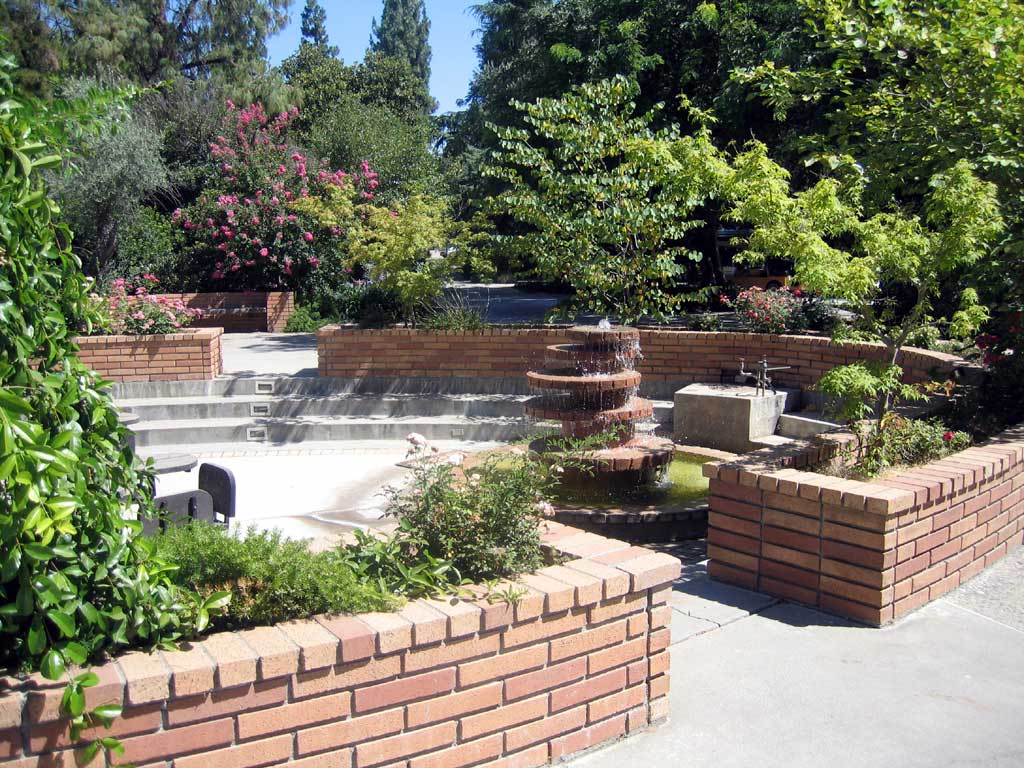
Campus

- The Wittenberg Door, a board located in the atrium of Steinert Campus Center, near the entrance to the dining room, is a place for the exchange of ideas. People are free to post expressions of their views, but are asked to write pieces in a charitable spirit and to include the writer's name. It was built in approximately 1983 and the original version was located in Alumni Hall when it still served as the campus cafeteria. A new board was built in 2004 and the old one was dismantled. The Mennonite Brethren Biblical Seminary has a board with the same name and purpose outside the B.C. Lounge.
- The Mennonite Central Committee holds its annual West Coast Relief Sale and Auction on the campus during the first weekend in April. Ethnic foods, used books, antiques, plants, world crafts and quilts are all sold on campus in various booths and auction events.
- University Family Thanksgiving Meal
- Winter Formal

== Notable alumni ==
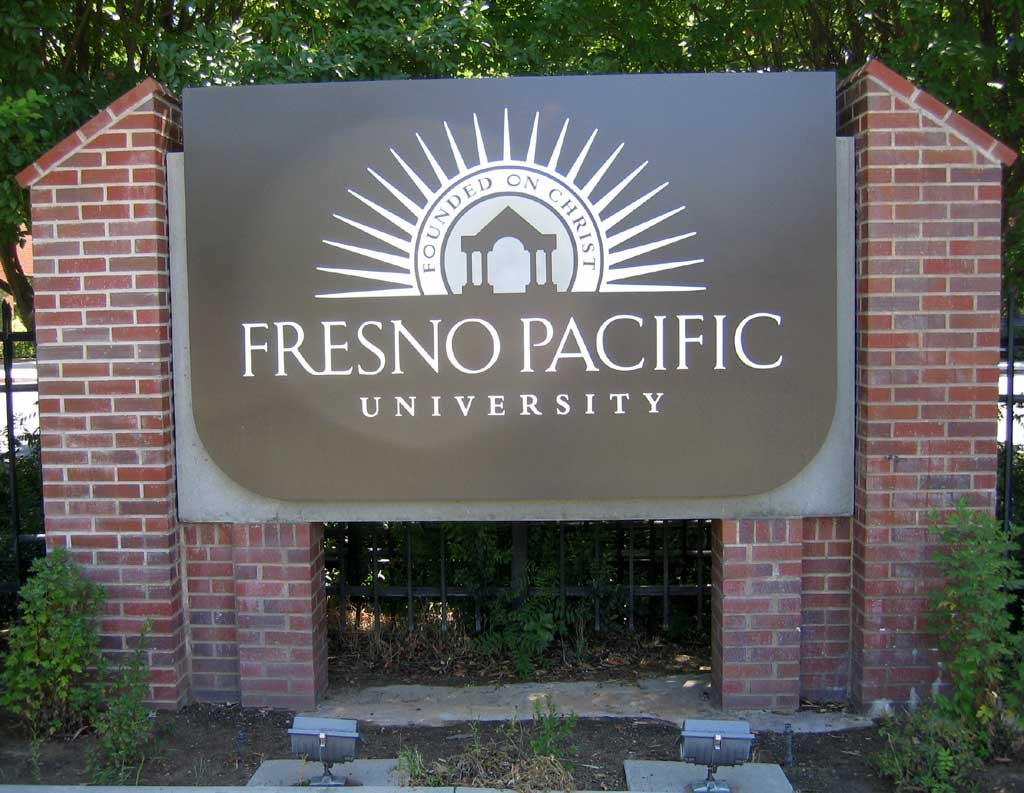

- Ron Adams, three-time NBA champion assistant coach for the Golden State Warriors
- Pablo Campos, professional soccer player and MLS champion with Real Salt Lake
- Malcolm Griffin, professional basketball player
- Rhoda Janzen, author
- Dan Quisenberry, former Major League Baseball all-star pitcher for the Kansas City Royals
- Chris Schwinden, former Major League Baseball pitcher for the New York Mets
- Joshua Urbiztondo professional basketball player (PBA)
- Joey Wells, head women's basketball coach at Indiana State University
