= Mennonite Brethren Collegiate Institute =

Private middle and high school in Winnipeg, Manitoba, Canada

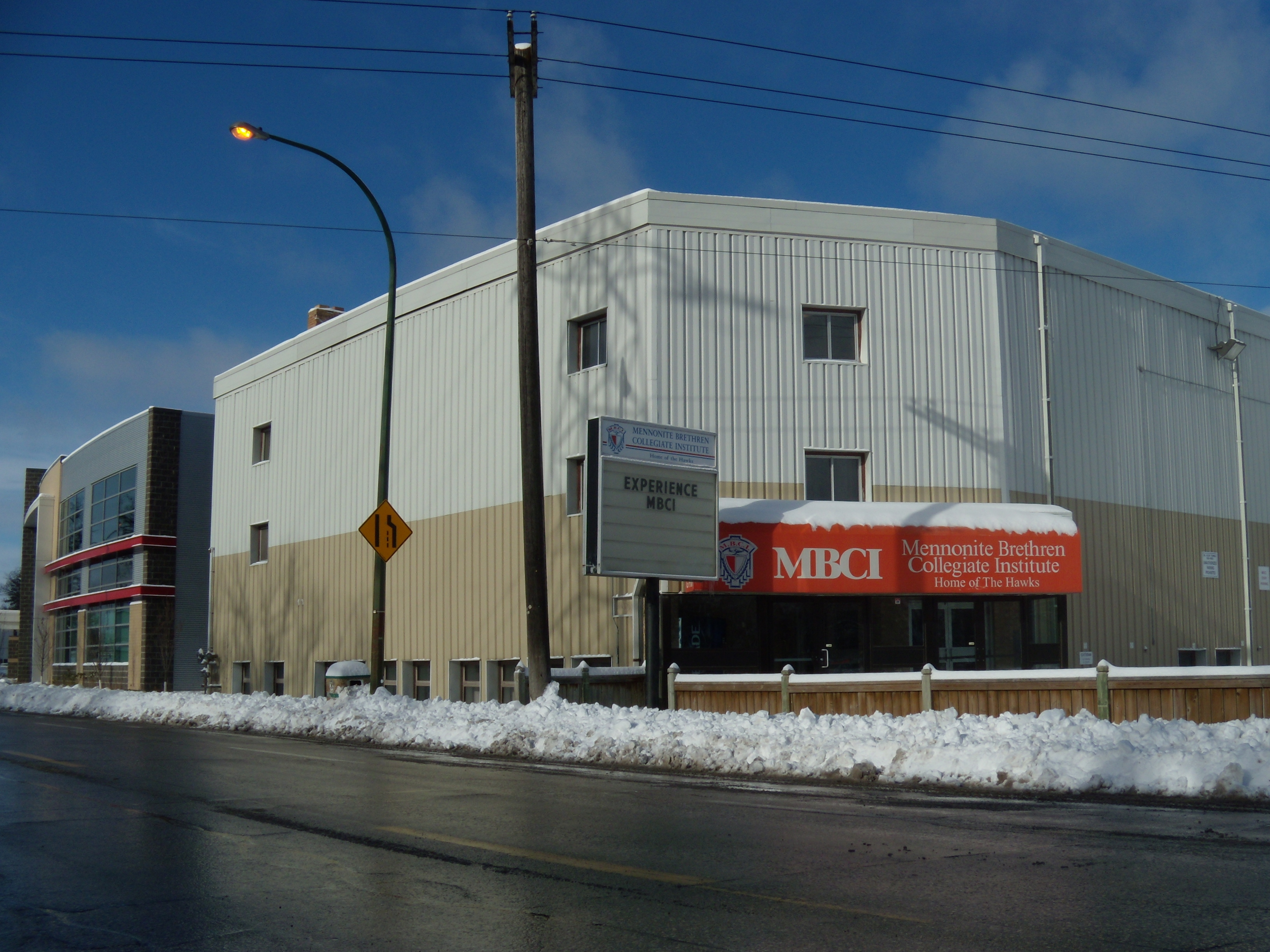

Location
- 173 Talbot Avenue; Winnipeg, Manitoba, R2L 0P6; Canada; 49.9097°N 97.1160°W

Information
- School type: Private, Middle and High School
- Motto: For no one can lay foundation other than the one already laid, which is Jesus Christ - 1 Corinthians 3:11
- Founded: 1945
- Principal: Andrea Buller
- Grades: 5-12
- Enrollment: 431
- Area: Winnipeg One School Division, River East Transcona
- Colours: Red, Blue, White, Black
- Team name: Hawks
- Website: www.mbci.mb.ca

The Mennonite Brethren Collegiate Institute (MBCI) is a Mennonite Brethren private middle and high school in Winnipeg, Manitoba.

== History ==
It was established in 1945, with forty-four students, located at the Mennonite Brethren Bible College, for students of grade 10 and 11. Grade 12 was added in 1946, grade 9 in 1947, grade 6 in 2004, and grade 5 in 2021.

The school relocated to 173 Talbot Avenue, and went through several renovations and additions, including new classrooms and labs in 1947, and a gymnasium in 1951. Completed and dedicated in 1954, the school was built in three wings, with a total cost of $95,000. At that time it boasted six classrooms, two laboratories, a chapel, an auditorium, and a nearby dormitory for 20 girls at 219 Talbot avenue. Subsequent building projects were carried out in 1959, 1972 and 1987.

In November 1984, grade 7 student Candace Derksen was abducted and murdered.

In 2003, school administrator Wilfred Regier was suspended indefinitely without pay following an inappropriate comment to a colleague.

In 2005, the school announced a $5.8M building project, which featured a park, new library with theatre, and new building on the site for offices and meeting rooms to expand space and add greenspace for the school's 323 students at the time. The building project involved the demolition of the former Anna Gibson School at 77 Henderson highway, which was opposed by the city's historical committee, who had recommended listing it as a historical site. The historical school had been one of only three remaining one-storey schools built after World War I to meet postwar demand.

In 2010, the school announced further expansions including an administrative wing and multi-purpose room, with the goal of increasing enrollment to 600 students from grade 6 through 12. The project included the demolition of an existing building and a two-storey addition, and was completed in 2010.

In 2019, students from the school built a nativity scene for Donwood Manor Personal Care Home. The CEO of Donwood reached out to the woodworking teacher at MBCI, who involved the arts teacher Merlin Braun and organized arts and woodworking students to collaborate and build the box-silhouette scene for the care home residents.

== Student body ==
After suffering a dip in enrolment during the pandemic years, MBCI has rebounded with continual growth, culminating in a current student body of 586 Grade 5 to Grade 12 students in 2026, and a projected record high of 600+ in the coming school year. As of 2022, approximately 40% of students were affiliated with Mennonite Brethren or other Mennonite churches, and 28% had no church affiliation. Earlier in the school's history, church attendance had been a requirement in order to study at the school, although this policy changed in the 1950s.

== Athletics ==
MBCI teams have won provincial tournaments in Boys and Girls volleyball, Boys basketball and Boys badminton.

== Band ==
The MBCI band program has been presented with the Optimist Festival's Commendation Award, Chairman's Award and Don Green Award on various occasions.

== Music theatre ==
MBCI has mounted musical productions every second year since 1968, in the school's 600-seat Jubilee Place concert hall, earning a record eight Rainbow Stage High School Musical Awards.

== Notable alumni ==
- Jon Buller, Contemporary Christian musician, Juno Award nominee, and founder of Hear the Music Ministries
- Brendan Fehr, Actor
- Cindy Klassen, six-time Olympic medallist in speed skating
- Starfield, a Juno award nominated Christian music group
- Mark Fast, fashion designer
