= U.S. Conference of Mennonite Brethren Churches =

The US Conference of Mennonite Brethren Churches (USMB) is an association of Mennonite Brethren Churches in the United States.

== Background ==
On January 6, 1860, a small group of Mennonites in Ukraine, influenced by Moravian Brethren and Lutheran Pietism, seeking greater emphasis on discipline, prayer and Bible study, met in the village of Elisabeththal, Molotschna and formed the Mennonite Brethren Church. Mennonite Brethren were among the migration of Mennonites from Russia to North America between 1874 and 1880, settling mainly in Kansas, Minnesota, Nebraska, and South Dakota. The earliest congregations in the United States were gathered in Kansas in 1874. In October 1879, representatives from those four states gathered in Henderson, Nebraska, to form a general conference. This general conference met annually until 1909; at which time the meetings were changed to every three years.

The first Mennonite Brethren congregation in Canada was founded in Winkler, Manitoba, in 1888 as a result of mission work from the United States. From 1923 to 1929, many Mennonite Brethren migrated from Russia to Canada, and some went to South America. In 1954, the desire of the Canadian churches for independence brought about the formation of two "area conferences" (as opposed to one general conference) of the Mennonite Brethren of North America - the subject of this article and the Canadian Conference of Mennonite Brethren Churches. The Krimmer Mennonite Brethren Conference formally merged with this body on November 14, 1960.

== Belief and practices ==
The first confession of faith of the Mennonite Brethren was written in 1873, revised in 1900 and published in 1902. The USMB also esteems the historic creeds of the Mennonites. Their confession of faith reveals the churches of the US Conference accept God in three persons; the divinity, humanity, virgin birth, atonement, resurrection, ascension and return of Jesus; the Bible as the inspired word of God; the fall of man and his salvation through the atoning work of Christ; the Lord's Day (Sunday) as a day of worship; and the resurrection of all men, either to eternal punishment or eternal happiness with God. The Mennonite Brethren Church holds two ordinances - baptism and the Lord's Supper.

Water baptism by immersion is the mode administered by local congregations, but they may receive on confession of faith persons who have been baptized by other modes. Those baptized as infants must receive baptism from a local Mennonite Brethren congregation on their profession of faith. Believers who have confessed their faith in Jesus Christ and understand the meaning of the Lord's Supper are invited to participate, though the understanding of the Mennonite Brethren is that baptism should precede participation in the communion service. USMB members reject the swearing of oaths, membership in secret societies, and bearing of arms in warfare. The church allows alternative types of service during times of war.

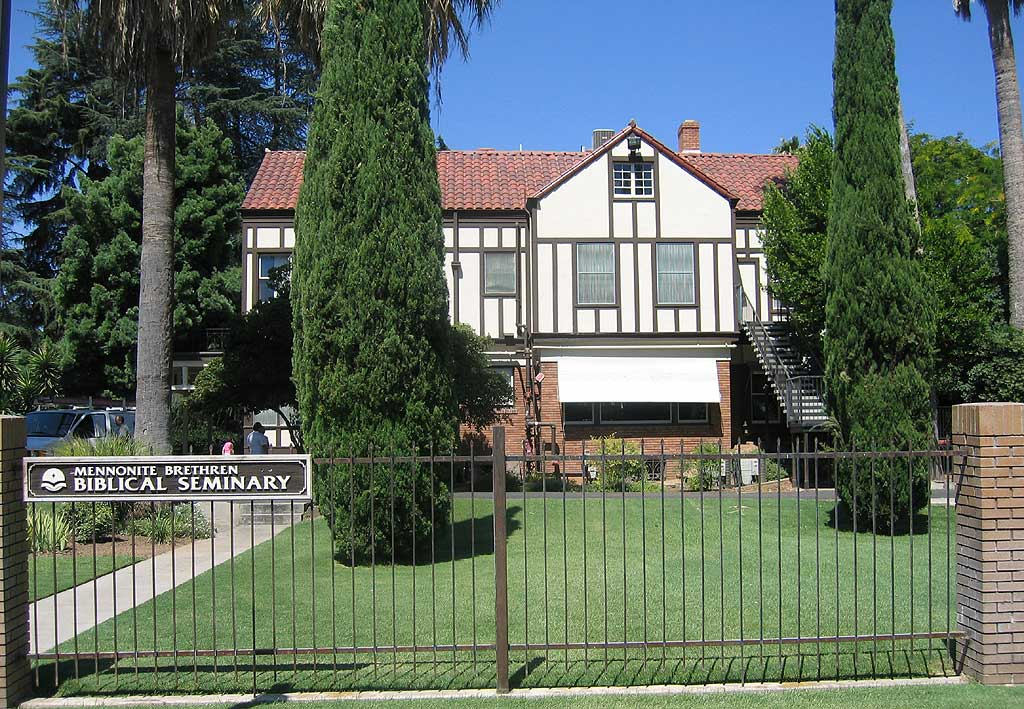
Fresno Pacific University Biblical Seminary

Organization includes a general assembly held every two years, to which delegates are sent by local congregations to elect people to serve on the Board of Church Ministries and other offices. A board of some type governs each ministry of the U.S. Conference.

== Members and congregations ==
In 2003 there were Mennonite Brethren congregations in more than 20 countries. The largest conferences are located in India and Congo. Offices of the US Conference of Mennonite Brethren Churches are located in Hillsboro, Kansas. They own and operate the higher education institutions of Tabor College, Kansas, Fresno Pacific University, and the Fresno Pacific University Biblical Seminary.

In 2003, the Mennonite Brethren had 188 congregations in the United States, with 26,219 members. In 2018 there were 34,857 baptized members in 200 congregations.

== Krimmer Mennonite Brethren Conference ==
The Krimmer (or Crimean) Mennonite Brethren Church was founded September 21, 1869, by Jacob A. Wiebe (1839-1921), the outgrowth of the Kleine Gemeinde revival in a village near Simferopol, Crimea. Unlike the majority of Mennonites, this body adopted triune forward immersion as the mode of baptism. They left for America as a group in 1874, arriving in New York on July 15. They eventually settled in Marion County, Kansas, and founded the village of Gnadenau. The body incorporated as the Krimmer Mennonite Brethren Church of North America in 1917. At the time of the merger with the Mennonite Brethren (1960), the Krimmer Church represented 11 congregations with almost 2000 members.
