= Canadian Conference of Mennonite Brethren Churches =

Anabaptist denomination

- Classification: Evangelical
- Orientation: Anabaptist
- Polity: Congregational
- Associations: International Community of Mennonite Brethren, Mennonite World Conference
- Region: Canada
- Headquarters: Winnipeg, Manitoba, Canada
- Origin: 1946
- Congregations: 237
- Members: 34,693
- Official website: www.mennonitebrethren.ca

The Canadian Conference of Mennonite Brethren Churches (CCMBC) is a Mennonite Brethren denomination in Canada. It is a member of the Mennonite World Conference and the Evangelical Fellowship of Canada.

Offices of the Canadian Conference of Mennonite Brethren Churches are located in Winnipeg, Manitoba, Calgary, Alberta, and Abbotsford, British Columbia.

== History ==
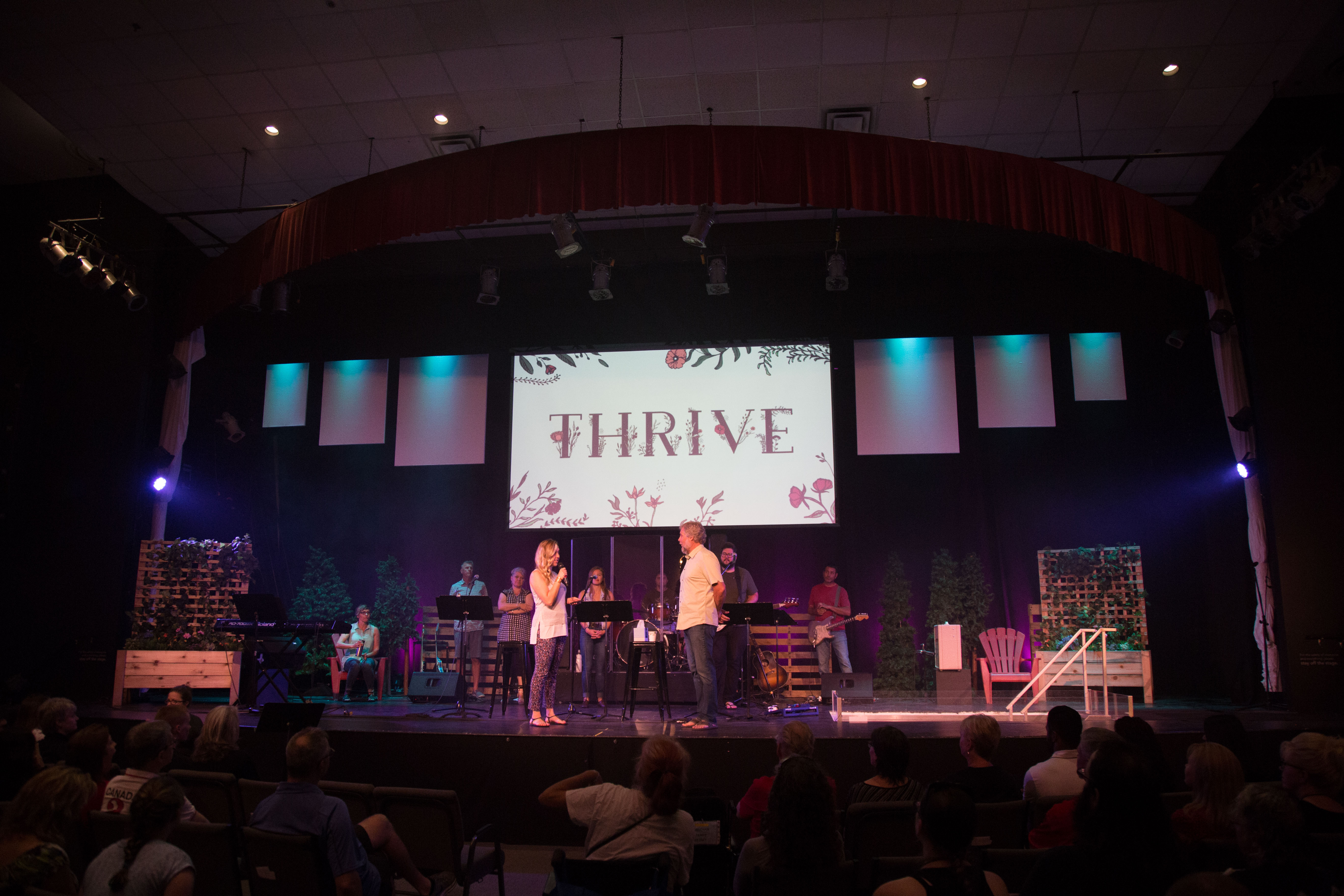
Worship service at The Meeting Place in Winnipeg

The Mennonite Brethren church began in Russia as a new expression of Mennonite faith in 1860 after Radical Pietism spread there. The Canadian Conference of Mennonite Brethren Churches (CCMBC) "trace[s] [its] history to several villages in the Molotschna colony in Ukraine."

The Canadian conference incorporated and adopted its current name in 1946. It had previously been a constituent unit of the General Conference of Mennonite Brethren Churches of North America. CCMBC is part of the worldwide community of Mennonite Brethren through its connection with the International Community of Mennonite Brethren.

The mid- to late twentieth century saw significant growth in the conference by means of evangelism. The conference grew from 87 congregations and 14,185 members in 1960 to 125 congregations and 17,025 members by 1970. In the 1980s, it had as many as 190 congregations and 27,277 members. According to a census published in 2018, it would have 237 churches and 34,693 baptized members.

== Structure ==
Every year, the Canadian Conference of Mennonite Brethren Churches hosts an annual general meeting that takes place in conjunction with Gathering (on even years) or study conference (on odd years). Gathering is the biennial national convention where MBs from across Canada gather for worship, fellowship. Study conference, held biennially, is hosted by the Board of Faith and Life and provides opportunities for MBs to interpret scripture and choose a direction together.

=== Provincial conferences ===
The CCMBC "is a national body which regulates the membership of area churches, which ... are known as provincial conferences." Local congregations first join their respective provincial conferences, and by virtue of that, become part of the Canadian Conference. Both national and provincial bodies are committed to working together in serving congregations and helping them succeed in growth and mission and are involved in ongoing collaborative dialogue to achieve that. British Columbia, Alberta, Saskatchewan, Manitoba, Ontario and Quebec have separate conferences of MB churches.

=== MB Seminary ===
MB Seminary (Mennonite Brethren Biblical Seminary) is the national seminary for the Canadian Conference of Mennonite Brethren Churches. MB Seminary exists to educate and equip men and women to help lead the church in reaching Canada and beyond with the Good News of Jesus Christ. MB Seminary is a Canadian ministry with an international reach, and a Mennonite Brethren ministry with multi-denominational relationships.

MB Seminary partners with multiple institutions in Canada to provide training that is accessible and collaborative. These partnerships include:

- ACTS Seminaries (Langley, British Columbia)
- Canadian Mennonite University (Winnipeg, Manitoba)
- Tyndale Seminary (Toronto, Ontario)
- Horizon College and Seminary (Saskatoon, Saskatchewan)

=== Colleges and schools ===
The following schools and colleges are affiliated with the Canadian Conference of MB Churches:

- Bethany College - Hepburn, Saskatchewan
- Canadian Mennonite University (CMU) – Winnipeg, Manitoba
- Columbia Bible College (CBC) – Abbotsford, British Columbia
- École de théologie évangélique de Montréal (ÉTEM) – Montreal, Quebec
- Mennonite Brethren Collegiate Institute (MBCI) – Winnipeg, Manitoba
- Mennonite Educational Institute (MEI) – Abbotsford, British Columbia
- Eden High School – St. Catharines, Ontario

=== Multiply ===
Multiply is the global mission agency for the MB Conferences in Canada and the US, working with MB churches in discipleship and church planting worldwide.

=== Camps ===
The following are Mennonite Brethren affiliated camps across Canada:

- Campfire Ministries – Black Creek, British Columbia
- Camp Crossroads – Torrance, Ontario
- Camp Evergreen – Sundre, Alberta
- Camp Likely – Likely, British Columbia
- Camp Péniel – Wentworth-Nord, Quebec
- Gardom Lake Bible Camp – Enderby, British Columbia
- Pines Bible Camp – Grand Forks, British Columbia
- Redberry Bible Camp – Waldheim, Saskatchewan
- Simonhouse Bible Camp – Cranberry Portage, Manitoba
- Stillwood Camp and Conference Centre – Lindell Beach, British Columbia
- West Bank Bible Camp – Swift Current, Saskatchewan

== Confession of faith ==
The Mennonite Brethren Church blends aspects of evangelicalism with its historic Anabaptist understanding of Christianity. Mennonite Brethren recognize the teachings and authority of the Bible, emphasize personal salvation, baptize confessed believers in Jesus Christ, and encourage community, discipleship, diversity, peacemaking, and reaching out.

The detailed Mennonite Brethren Confession of Faith lists 18 articles of confession.

== Publications ==
The Mennonite Brethren Herald is published monthly. Le Lien and the Chinese Herald, magazines published bi-monthly, serve the francophone and Chinese communities.
