= Prairie Athletic Conference =

- Abbreviation: PAC
- Founded: 1969
- Region served: Saskatchewan and Alberta
- President: Kevin Peters
- Website: pacsport.ca

The Prairie Athletic Conference (PAC) is the governing body for collegiate sports in Saskatchewan and it was founded in 1969. The PAC is currently represented by six schools: four in Saskatchewan, and two in Alberta, that compete in three sports.

The PAC was a member of the Canadian Collegiate Athletic Association until 1994.

== Members ==
Current Members

Institution	Nickname	City	Province	Founded	Affiliation	Enrollment	Sports	Athletics website
Briercrest College and Seminary	Clippers (Junior Varsity)	Caronport	SK	1935	Private	640	Basketball, Volleyball	https://www.gobriercrest.ca/
Burman University	Bobcats	Lacombe	AB	1907	Independent	306	Basketball, Futsal, Volleyball	https://www.burmanu.ca/athletics
Millar College of the Bible	Edge	Pambrun	SK	1932	Private	175	Basketball, Futsal, Volleyball	https://www.millarcollege.ca/athletics
Prairie College	Pilots	Three Hills	AB	1922	Private	535	Basketball, Futsal, Volleyball	https://www.prairie.edu/pilots-athletics/
Saskatchewan Polytechnic — Moose Jaw campus	Panthers	Moose Jaw	SK	1959	Public	3,192	Basketball, Futsal, Volleyball	https://saskpolytech.ca/student-services/student-life/fitness-and-recreation/
Saskatchewan Polytechnic — Saskatoon campus	Amaruks	Saskatoon	SK	1963	Public	7,956	Volleyball	https://saskpolytech.ca/student-services/student-life/fitness-and-recreation/

Former Members

- Aldersgate College in Moose Jaw, Saskatchewan
- Athol Murray College of Notre Dame Hounds in Wilcox, Saskatchewan
- Ambrose University Lions in Calgary, Alberta
- Assiniboine Community College Cougars in Brandon, Manitoba
- Bethany College Eagles in Hepburn, Saskatchewan
- Canadian Bible College Crusaders in Regina, Saskatchewan
- Caronport High School Cougars in Caronport, Saskatchewan
- Eston College in Eston, Saskatchewan
- First Nations University of Canada Pumas in Regina, Saskatchewan
- Great Plains College SunDogs in Swift Current, Saskatchewan
- Luther College in Regina, Saskatchewan
- Nipawin Bible College Royals in Nipawin, Saskatchewan
- Regina Downtown Optimists in Regina, Saskatchewan
- University of Regina Cougars in Regina, Saskatchewan (Junior Varsity)
- University of Saskatchewan Huskies in Saskatoon, Saskatchewan (Junior Varsity)
- SIAST Wascana Wildcats in Regina, Saskatchewan
- SIAST Woodland Wild in Prince Albert, Saskatchewan
- St. Thomas More College in Saskatoon, Saskatchewan

== Sports ==
Current

- Basketball
- Futsal
- Volleyball

Past

- Ice Hockey
- Outdoor Soccer

== Provincial Champions ==
Men's Basketball

Extended content
- Most Titles: Briercrest Clippers - 19
- November 2023: Prairie Pilots (3)
- March 2023: Millar Edge (10)
- 2022: Burman Bobcats (2)
- 2021: Season canceled due to the COVID-19 pandemic
- 2020: Playoffs canceled due to the COVID-19 pandemic
- 2019: Burman Bobcats (1)
- 2018: Saskatoon Amaruks (3)
- 2017: Saskatoon Amaruks (2)
- 2016: Prairie Pilots (2)
- 2015: Millar Edge (9)
- 2014: Kelsey Amaruks (1)
- 2013: Millar Edge (8)
- 2012: Bethany Eagles (3)
- 2011: Millar Edge (7)
- 2010: Millar Edge (6)
- 2009: Bethany Eagles (2)
- 2008: Millar Edge (5)
- 2007: Millar Edge (4)
- 2006: Millar Edge (3)
- 2005: Palliser Panthers (8)
- 2004: Bethany Eagles (1)
- 2003: Palliser Panthers (7)
- 2002: Palliser Panthers (6)
- 2001: CBC Crusaders (6)
- 2000: Palliser Panthers (5)
- 1999: CBC Crusaders (5)
- 1998: CBC Crusaders (4)
- 1997: Palliser Panthers (4)
- 1996: CBC Crusaders (3)
- 1995: Tier 1- Briercrest Clippers (19) Tier 2- Millar Edge (2)
- 1994: Tier 1- Prairie Pilots (1) Tier 2- Millar Edge (1)
- 1993: Briercrest Clippers (18)
- 1992: Briercrest Clippers (17)
- 1991: Briercrest Clippers (16)
- 1990: Briercrest Clippers (15)
- 1989: Briercrest Clippers (14)
- 1988: CBC Crusaders (2)
- 1987: STI Beavers (3)
- 1986: STI Beavers (2)
- 1985: CBC Crusaders (1)
- 1984: STI Beavers (1)
- 1983: Briercrest Clippers (13)
- 1982: Briercrest Clippers (12)
- 1981: Briercrest Clippers (11)
- 1980: Briercrest Clippers (10)
- 1979: Briercrest Clippers (9)
- 1978: Briercrest Clippers (8)
- 1977: Briercrest Clippers (7) (Won CCAA National Championship)
- 1976: Briercrest Clippers (6)
- 1975: Briercrest Clippers (5)
- 1974: Regina Cougars JV (1)
- 1973: Briercrest Clippers (4)
- 1972: Briercrest Clippers (3)
- 1971: Briercrest Clippers (2)
- 1970: Briercrest Clippers (1)

Women's Basketball

Extended content
- Most Titles: Millar Edge - 9
- November 2023: Millar Edge (9)
- March 2023: Millar Edge (8)
- 2022: Burman Bobcats (1)
- 2021: Season canceled due to the COVID-19 pandemic
- 2020: Playoffs canceled due to the COVID-19 pandemic
- 2019: Prairie Pilots (3)
- 2018: Prairie Pilots (2)
- 2017: Saskatoon Amaruks (7)
- 2016: Prairie Pilots (1)
- 2015: Millar Edge (7)
- 2014: Millar Edge (6)
- 2013: Millar Edge (5)
- 2012: Millar Edge (4)
- 2011: No season played
- 2010: Millar Edge (3)
- 2009: Millar Edge (2)
- 2008: Bethany Eagles (6)
- 2007: Bethany Eagles (5)
- 2006: Bethany Eagles (4)
- 2005: Palliser Panthers (5)
- 2004: Bethany Eagles (3)
- 2003: CBC Crusaders (6)
- 2002: Millar Edge (1)
- 2001: CBC Crusaders (5)
- 2000: Palliser Panthers (4)
- 1999: CBC Crusaders (4)
- 1998: Bethany Eagles (2)
- 1997: Palliser Panthers (3)
- 1996: Bethany Eagles (1)
- 1995: Tier 1- Briercrest Clippers (7) Tier 2- Palliser Panthers (2)
- 1994: Briercrest Clippers (6)
- 1993: Briercrest Clippers (5)
- 1992: Briercrest Clippers (4)
- 1991: Briercrest Clippers (3)
- 1990: Kelsey Amaruks (6)
- 1989: Briercrest Clippers (2)
- 1988: CBC Crusaders (3)
- 1987: Wascana Wildcats (5)
- 1986: Kelsey Amaruks (5)
- 1985: CBC Crusaders (2)
- 1984: Kelsey Amaruks (4)
- 1983: CBC Crusaders (1)
- 1982: Wascana Wildcats (4)
- 1981: Briercrest Clippers (1)
- 1980: Wascana Wildcats (3)
- 1979: Wascana Wildcats (2)
- 1978: Wascana Wildcats (1)
- 1977: Kelsey Amaruks (3)
- 1976: Kelsey Amaruks (2)
- 1975: Kelsey Amaruks (1)
- 1974: No season played
- 1973: STI Beavers (1)

Men's Volleyball

Extended content
- Most Titles: Briercrest Clippers - 12
- 2024: Millar Edge (11)
- 2023: Millar Edge (10)
- 2022: Millar Edge (9)
- 2021: No season played due to the COVID-19 pandemic
- 2020: No season played due to the COVID-19 pandemic
- 2019: Millar Edge (8)
- 2018: Briercrest Clippers JV (12)
- 2017: Millar Edge (7)
- 2016: Millar Edge (6)
- 2015: Prairie Pilots (1)
- 2014: Millar Edge (5)
- 2013: Great Plains SunDogs (3)
- 2012: Palliser Panthers (6)
- 2011: Great Plains SunDogs (2)
- 2010: Millar Edge (4)
- 2009: Great Plains SunDogs (1)
- 2008: Millar Edge (3)
- 2007: Kelsey Amaruks (11)
- 2006: Palliser Panthers (5)
- 2005: Millar Edge (2)
- 2004: Palliser Panthers (4)
- 2003: Bethany Eagles (7)
- 2002: Bethany Eagles (6)
- 2001: Kelsey Amaruks (10)
- 2000: Kelsey Amaruks (9)
- 1999: Bethany Eagles (5
- 1998: Bethany Eagles (4)
- 1997: Bethany Eagles (3)
- 1996: Bethany Eagles (2)
- 1995: Millar Edge (1)
- 1994: Bethany Eagles (1)
- 1993: Kelsey Amaruks (8)
- 1992: Briercrest Clippers (11)
- 1991: Briercrest Clippers (10)
- 1990: Briercrest Clippers (9)
- 1989: Briercrest Clippers (8)
- 1988: Kelsey Amaruks (7)
- 1987: Briercrest Clippers (7)
- 1986: Briercrest Clippers (6)
- 1985: Briercrest Clippers (5)
- 1984: Briercrest Clippers (4)
- 1983: Kelsey Amaruks (6)
- 1982: Kelsey Amaruks (5)
- 1981: Kelsey Amaruks (4)
- 1980: Kelsey Amaruks (3)
- 1979: Kelsey Amaruks (2)
- 1978: STI Beavers (3)
- 1977: Briercrest Clippers (3)
- 1976: Briercrest Clippers (2)
- 1975: Kelsey Amaruks (1)
- 1974: Regina Cougars JV (3)
- 1973: Regina Cougars JV (2)
- 1972: Regina Cougars JV (1)
- 1971: STI Beavers (2)
- 1970: Briercrest Clippers (1)
- 1969: STI Beavers (1)

Women's Volleyball

Extended content
- Most Titles: Saskatoon Amaruks - 24
- 2024: Millar Edge (3)
- 2023: Millar Edge (2)
- 2022: Millar Edge (1)
- 2021: No season played due to the COVID-19 pandemic
- 2020: No season played due to the COVID-19 pandemic
- 2019: Great Plains SunDogs (2)
- 2018: Great Plains SunDogs (1)
- 2017: Briercrest Clippers JV (8)
- 2016: Saskatoon Amaruks (24)
- 2015: Saskatoon Amaruks (23)
- 2014: Saskatoon Amaruks (22)
- 2013: Kelsey Amaruks (21)
- 2012: Bethany Eagles (1)
- 2011: Palliser Panthers (7)
- 2010: Kelsey Amaruks (20)
- 2009: Kelsey Amaruks (19)
- 2008: Kelsey Amaruks (18)
- 2007: Kelsey Amaruks (17)
- 2006: Wascana Wildcats (3)
- 2005: Kelsey Amaruks (16)
- 2004: Wascana Wildcats (2)
- 2003: Kelsey Amaruks (15)
- 2002: Kelsey Amaruks (14)
- 2001: Palliser Panthers (6)
- 2000: Palliser Panthers (5)
- 1999: Kelsey Amaruks (13)
- 1998: Palliser Panthers (4)
- 1997: Palliser Panthers (3)
- 1996: Kelsey Amaruks (12)
- 1995: Kelsey Amaruks (11)
- 1994: Kelsey Amaruks (10)
- 1993: Kelsey Amaruks (9)
- 1992: Briercrest Clippers (7)
- 1991: Briercrest Clippers (6)
- 1990: Briercrest Clippers (5)
- 1989: Briercrest Clippers (4)
- 1988: Briercrest Clippers (3)
- 1987: Briercrest Clippers (2)
- 1986: STI Beavers (2)
- 1985: STI Beavers (1)
- 1984: Kelsey Amaruks (8)
- 1983: Kelsey Amaruks (7)
- 1982: Briercrest Clippers (1)
- 1981: Kelsey Amaruks (6)
- 1980: Kelsey Amaruks (5)
- 1979: Kelsey Amaruks (4)
- 1978: Kelsey Amaruks (3)
- 1977: Kelsey Amaruks (2)
- 1976: Wascana Wildcats (1)
- 1975: Kelsey Amaruks (1)
- 1974: Regina Cougars JV (3)
- 1973: Regina Cougars JV (2)
- 1972: Regina Cougars JV 1)

Men's Ice Hockey

Extended content
- Most Titles: Kelsey Amaruks - 12
- 1990: Kelsey Amaruks (12)
- 1989: Palliser Beavers (6)
- 1988: Kelsey Amaruks (11)
- 1987: Kelsey Amaruks (10)
- 1986: STI Beavers (5)
- 1985: Kelsey Amaruks (9)
- 1984: Kelsey Amaruks (8)
- 1983: Kelsey Amaruks (7)
- 1982: STI Beavers (4)
- 1981: STI Beavers (3)
- 1980: Briercrest Clippers (2)
- 1979: STI Beavers (2)
- 1978: Kelsey Amaruks (6)
- 1977: Kelsey Amaruks (5)
- 1976: Kelsey Amaruks (4)
- 1975: Kelsey Amaruks (3)
- 1974: Kelsey Amaruks (2)
- 1973: Kelsey Amaruks (1)
- 1972: STI Beavers (1)
- 1971: Briercrest Clippers (1)
- 1970: CBC Crusaders (1)

Men's Indoor Soccer/Futsal

Extended content
- Most Titles: Moose Jaw Panthers - 6
- December 2023: Millar Edge (2)
- February 2023: Burman Bobcats (2)
- 2022: Prairie Pilots (3)
- 2021: No season played due to the COVID-19 pandemic
- 2020: No season played due to the COVID-19 pandemic
- 2019: Burman Bobcats (1)
- 2018: Saskatoon Amaruks (1)
- 2017: Moose Jaw Panthers (6)
- 2016: Prairie Pilots (2)
- 2015: Prairie Pilots (1)
- 2014: Bethany Eagles (4)
- 2013: Bethany Eagles (3)
- 2012: Bethany Eagles (2)
- 2011: Nipawin Royals (1)
- 2010: Briercrest Clippers (1)
- 2009: Millar Edge (1)
- 2008: Bethany Eagles (1)
- 2007: Palliser Panthers (5)
- 2006: Palliser Panthers (4)
- 2005: Palliser Panthers (3)
- 2004: Palliser Panthers (2)
- 2003: CBC Crusaders (3)
- 2002: Palliser Panthers (1)
- 2001: CBC Crusaders (2)
- 2000: CBC Crusaders (1)

Women's Indoor Soccer/Futsal

Extended content
- Most Titles: Millar Edge - 9
- December 2023: Millar Edge (9)
- February 2023: Burman Bobcats (3)
- 2022: Burman Bobcats (2)
- 2021: No season played due to the COVID-19 pandemic
- 2020: No season played due to the COVID-19 pandemic
- 2019: Burman Bobcats (1)
- 2018: Saskatoon Amaruks (1)
- 2017: Millar Edge (8)
- 2016: Millar Edge (7)
- 2015: Millar Edge (6)
- 2014: Bethany Eagles (4)
- 2013: Prairie Pilots (1)
- 2012: Millar Edge (5)
- 2011: Bethany Eagles (3)
- 2010: Millar Edge (4)
- 2009: Millar Edge (3)
- 2008: Bethany Eagles (2)
- 2007: Millar Edge (2)
- 2006: Briercrest Clippers (3)
- 2005: Briercrest Clippers (2)
- 2004: Palliser Panthers (2)
- 2003: Millar Edge (1)
- 2002: Bethany Eagles (1)
- 2001: Palliser Panthers (1)
- 2000: Briercrest Clippers (1)

Men's Outdoor Soccer

Extended content
- Most Titles: Millar Edge - 8
- 2019: Millar Edge (8)
- 2018: Briercrest Clippers (4)
- 2017: Briercrest Clippers (3)
- 2016: Millar Edge (7)
- 2015: Prairie Pilots (1)
- 2014: Millar Edge (6)
- 2013: Bethany Eagles (4)
- 2012: Bethany Eagles (3)
- 2011: Championship cancelled
- 2010: Nipawin Royals (1)
- 2009: Briercrest Clippers (2)
- 2008: Millar Edge (5)
- 2007: Millar Edge (4)
- 2006: Briercrest Clippers (1)
- 2005: Millar Edge (3)
- 2004: Bethany Eagles (2)
- 2003: Bethany Eagles (1)
- 2002: Millar Edge (2)
- 2001: Millar Edge (1)

Women's Outdoor Soccer

Extended content
- Most Titles: Millar Edge - 8
- 2019: Briercrest Clippers (5)
- 2018: Briercrest Clippers (4)
- 2017: Briercrest Clippers (3)
- 2016: Millar Edge (8)
- 2015: Millar Edge (7)
- 2014: Millar Edge (6)
- 2013: Millar Edge (5)
- 2012: Millar Edge (4)
- 2011: Championship cancelled
- 2010: Millar Edge (3)
- 2009: Briercrest Clippers (2)
- 2008: Millar Edge (2)
- 2007: Millar Edge (1)
- 2006: Briercrest Clippers (1)
- 2005: Bethany Eagles (3)
- 2004: Bethany Eagles (2)
- 2003: Bethany Eagles (1)
