= Urbana (conference) =

Christian conference

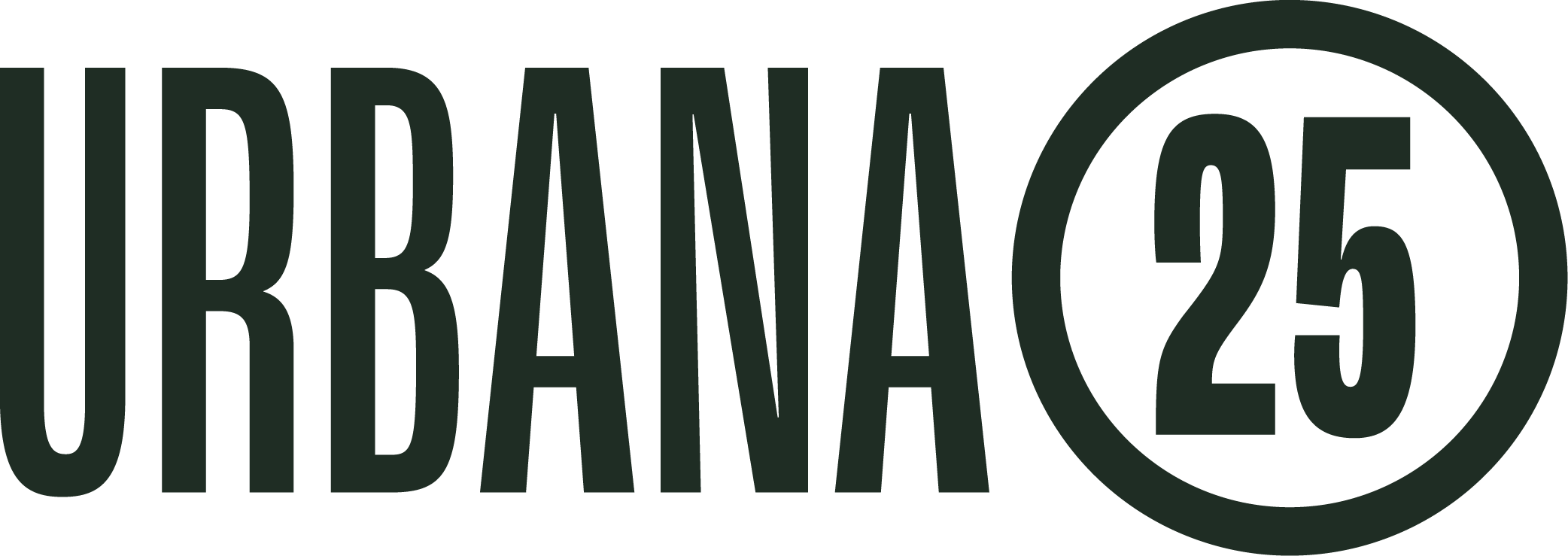
- Logo for Urbana 25
- Status: Active
- Genre: Christian; Missions; Evangelism; Social justice; College/University/Seminary
- Venue: Phoenix Convention Center
- Locations: Phoenix, Arizona (2025); Indianapolis, Indiana (2022); St. Louis, Missouri (2006, 2009, 2012, 2015, 2018)
- Country: United States (since 1948)
- Inaugurated: 1946
- Most recent: 2025
- Organizer: InterVarsity Christian Fellowship
- Website: urbana.org

Urbana is a major Christian student missions conference in North America sponsored by InterVarsity Christian Fellowship. The event is designed to inform Christian students about global issues and issues around the world and missional living. The conference also encourages students to explore the biblical mandate for cross-cultural missions and encourages them to participate in missions.

The first/precursor “Urbana” Student Missions Convention was held in 1946 in Toronto, and since then, it has generally been held every three years. From 1948 to 2003, Urbana took place at the University of Illinois at Urbana-Champaign, with the primary venue after 1963 being the Assembly Hall (now State Farm Center), the school's basketball arena. The 2025 event was held in Phoenix, Arizona.

== History ==
=== 1940s ===
The first Urbana was held in 1946 at the University of Toronto in Toronto, Ontario, Canada. 151 colleges, universities, and seminaries from across North America were represented, along with 100 missionaries. L. E. Maxwell, president of Prairie Bible Institute, and other noted Christian leaders in academia spoke at the December event. The second Urbana was held in 1948, this time at the University of Illinois at Champaign-Urbana. Jim Elliot, known for his missionary work and martyrdom in Ecuador, attended this Urbana as a student. The slogan for this Urbana was "From Every Campus to Every Country." 1,300 students from 154 campuses participated. Speakers included Frank Houghton, V. Raymond Edman, and Billy Graham.

=== 1950s ===
The 1954 Urbana had the theme "Changing World; Changeless Christ" and hosted 2,000 students from 263 schools. A. W. Tozer, who preached on Bible characters, and Alan Redpath were among those who spoke at this Urbana. The number of students attending Urbana grew to 3,500 in 1957, and the theme that year was "One Lord—One Church—One World." Billy Graham returned to speak at this conference, and was joined by the likes of Donald Barnhouse and Harold Ockenga. Urbana 57 was held in a gymnasium with poor acoustics, and with the University of Illinois set to finish building a new assembly room by 1961, the next Urbana was postponed.

=== 1960s ===
Urbana 61 had a change in format from previous conferences. It featured a "plenary panel" about mission work, a "plenary forum" that involved a question-and-answer time with various Christian leaders, elective courses on specific topics related to missions, missionary sessions, and a pastoral group. The theme was "Commission—Conflict—Commitment." 5,400 students participated in this conference. Eugene Nida, Arthur Glasser, and Urbana veterans David Howard Adeney and Billy Graham were speakers. Festo Kivengere preached on Jacob and Esau.

=== 1970s ===
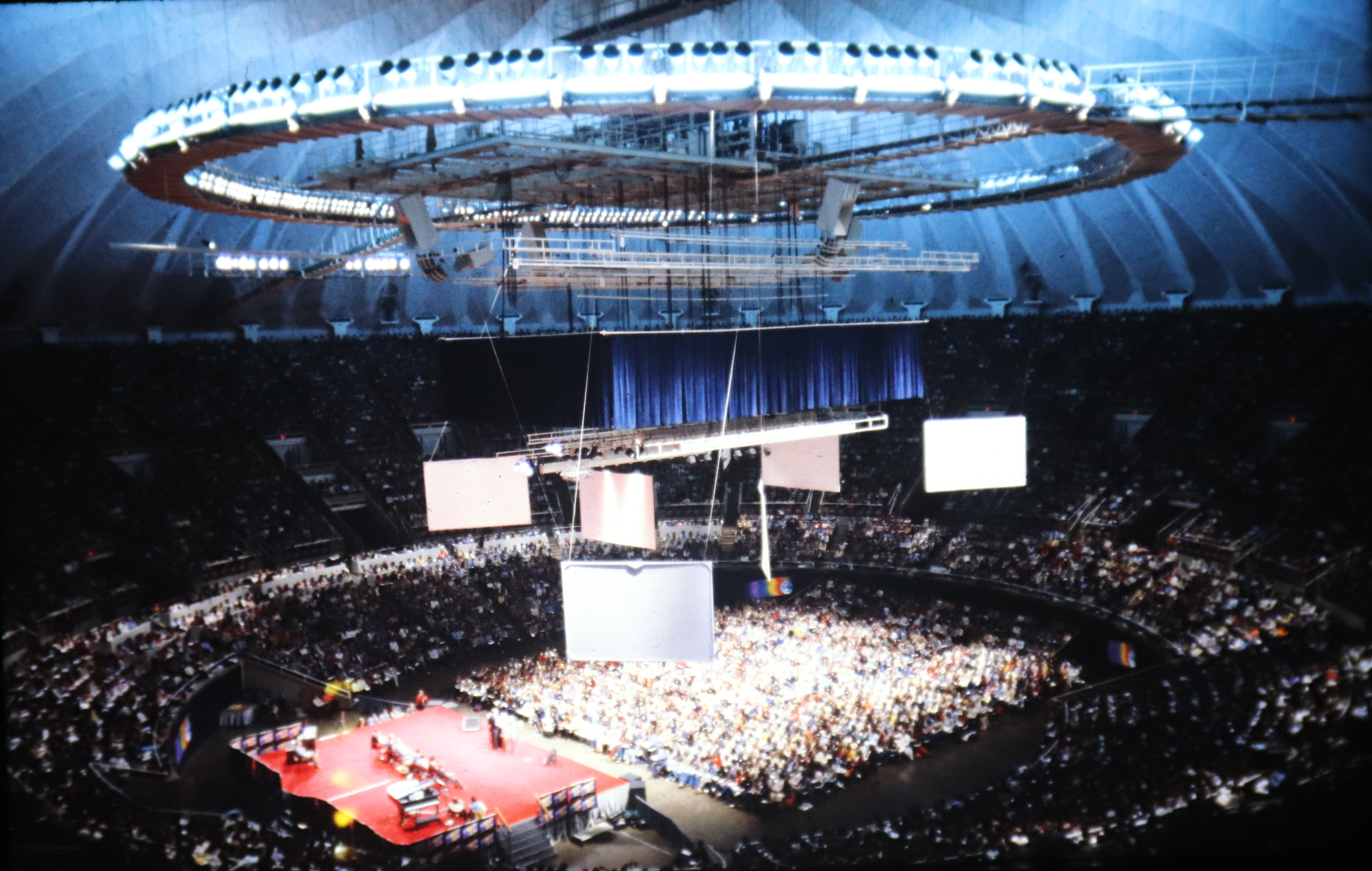
Attendees at the 1979 conference

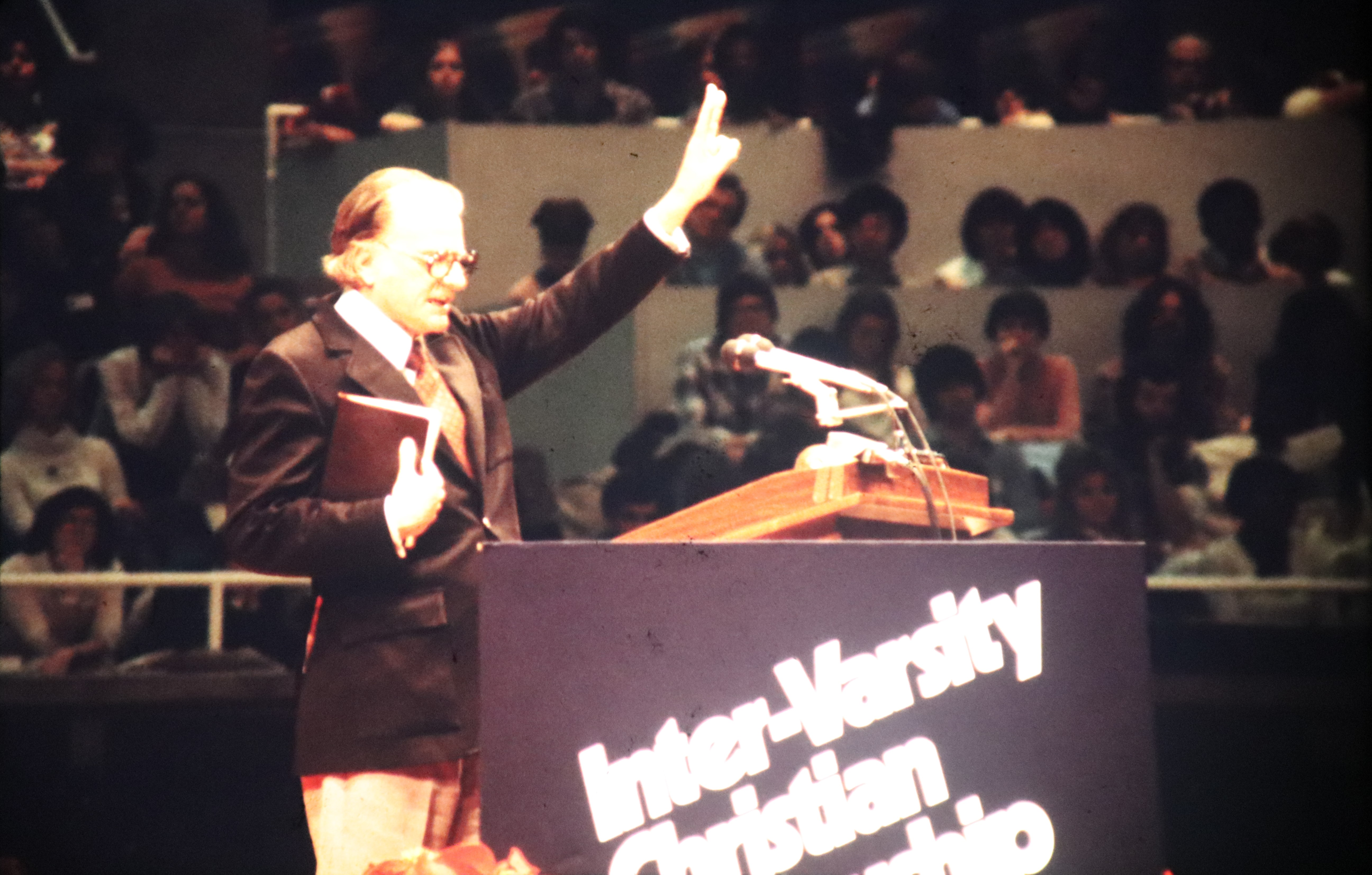
Billy Graham speaking at the 1979 conference

Urbana 70's theme was "World Evangelism: Why? How? Who?" and included speakers John Stott, David Howard, Leighton Ford, Byang Kato, Samuel Kamelson, and Tom Skinner. Urbana 76 was themed "Declare His Glory Among the Nations." John Stott spoke on the biblical basis for mission, Elisabeth Elliot on the will of God, and Helen Roseveare on Declaring His Glory in Suffering. 17,000 students participated in 1,700 small groups, meeting each morning for Bible study and every evening for prayer. "That All Nations Might Believe and Obey Jesus Christ" was the theme for Urbana 79. Many speakers made repeat appearances, including John Stott, Billy Graham, and Elisabeth Elliot. Joining them were Luis Palau, David Howard Adeney, and others. Urbana 79 experienced capacity issues due to so many students wanting to attend that the next conference would be held just two years later.

=== 2010s ===
Urbana 12 speakers included Calisto Odede, David Platt, Chai Ling, Daniel Bourdanne, Ziel Machado, Geri Rodman, Terry LeBlanc, and featured a performance by Andy Mineo. Sandra Maria Van Opstal led worship again with a focus on the integration of multiethnic worship and mission. Urbana 12 also partnered with World Vision to include a Caregiver Kit Build: the 15,000 attendees assembled 32,000 Caregiver Kits which were then shipped to volunteer caregivers who work with AIDS patients in Swaziland and other African countries.

== See also ==
- College religious organizations
- International Fellowship of Evangelical Students
- World Student Christian Federation
