= Paul Chamberlain =

Canadian philosopher and professor

- Born: 1954 (age 71–72)
- Education: Trinity International University (1981); Marquette University (1990)
- Occupation: Professor

Paul Chamberlain (born 1954) is a Canadian philosopher and professor. He teaches in the areas of Christian Apologetics, Ethics and Philosophy of Religion, and is also the Director of TWU's Institute of Christian Apologetics.

== Life and career ==
Chamberlain was born in 1954. He graduated from Trinity International University in 1981 and holds a Ph.D. in Philosophy from Marquette University. He holds additional diplomas and degrees in the following: Theological Studies, Peace River Bible Institute; Diploma in Pastoral Studies, Prairie Bible Institute; B.R.E., Providence College; Graduate Studies, Providence Theological Seminary; M.Div., Trinity International University. He currently serves as the director of the Institute of Christian Apologetics and professor of apologetics, ethics and philosophy of religion at Trinity Western University in Langley, British Columbia British Columbia. He recently held the position of Canadian Executive Director of Ravi Zacharias International Ministries. Chamberlain has pastored churches in Canada and the United States.

Chamberlain has also authored five books including Can We Be Good Without God, Final Wishes, Talking About Good And Bad Without Getting Ugly, Hell Upon Water and Why People Don't Believe, and published numerous articles in the field of ethics, physician-assisted suicide, philosophy of religion, and apologetics. He has participated widely in public debates and has made guest appearances on numerous radio and TV programs.

== Writings ==
- Why People Don't Believe: Confronting Seven Challenges to Christian Faith, 2011, Baker Books, ISBN 978-0-8010-1377-5
- Hell Upon Water: Prisoners of War in Britain 1793-1815, 2008, Spellmount, ISBN 978-1862274662
- Talking About Good And Bad Without Getting Ugly: A Guide To Moral Persuasion, 2005, InterVarsity Press ISBN 978-0-8308-3268-2
- Final Wishes: A Cautionary Tale on Death, Dignity & Physician-Assisted Suicide, 2000, InterVarsity Press, ISBN 978-0-8308-2259-1. In 2275 libraries, according to WorldCat
- Can We Be Good Without God? A Conversation About Truth, Morality, Culture & a Few Other Things That Matter, 1996, InterVarsity Press ISBN 978-0-8308-1686-6
