= L. E. Maxwell =

American-Canadian educator and minister

Leslie Earl Maxwell (July 2, 1895 – February 4, 1984), was an American-born Canadian educator and minister.

Maxwell was born in Salina, Kansas in 1895 to Edwin Hugh and Marion (née Anderson) Maxwell. He was a graduate of the Midland Bible Institute, a short lived school of the Christian and Missionary Alliance in Kansas City. He was invited to come to the town of Three Hills, Alberta by J. Fergus Kirk, a Presbyterian lay preacher and farmer. Maxwell's assignment was to teach the Bible to the local young people through a structured curriculum he was to develop. On October 9, 1922 the Prairie Bible Institute was opened with eight students.

L. E. Maxwell readily became the school's dynamic principal and eventual president. Under his leadership Prairie Bible Institute grew to become Canada's premier missionary training center with international influence among evangelical Christians. In addition to the Bible School in Three Hills, another Bible Institute was initiated in the north at Sexsmith, Alberta and a Christian Academy was added on the Three Hills campus in the 1930s. After Maxwell's death in 1984 two more post-secondary schools were created to train missionary pilots and professional trades personnel. Today, as many as 900 students study each year at one of these five schools founded or influenced by L.E. Maxwell.

Over the course of his teaching ministry Maxwell authored several books including Born Crucified, Crowded to Christ, Abandoned to Christ, and World Missions: Total War. Another book he had been working on, Women In Ministry, was published after Maxwell's death by co-author and fellow Bible educator, Ruth Dearing.

After 58 years as principal, president and professor, L. E. Maxwell retired in the spring of 1980 near the age of 85.
