= List of Carolina Hurricanes head coaches =

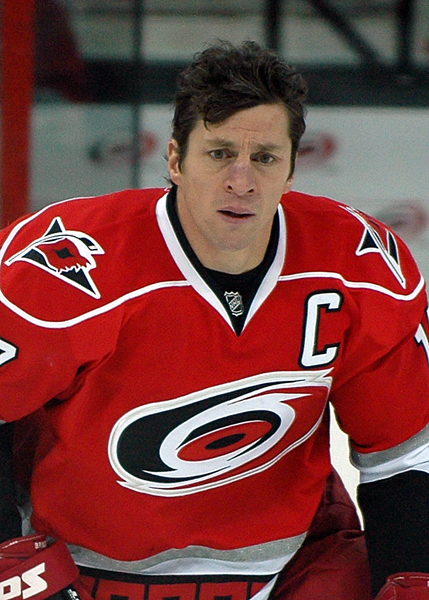
Current Head Coach Rod Brind'Amour as captain of the Carolina Hurricanes in 2009

The Carolina Hurricanes are an American professional ice hockey team based in Raleigh, North Carolina. They play in the Metropolitan Division of the Eastern Conference in the National Hockey League (NHL). The current head coach is Rod Brind'Amour. The team joined the NHL in 1979 as an expansion team as the Hartford Whalers, but moved to Raleigh, North Carolina in 1997. The Hurricanes won their first Stanley Cup championship in 2006. Having first played at the Greensboro Coliseum, the Hurricanes have played their home games at the PNC Arena, which was first named the Raleigh Entertainment & Sports Arena, since 1999. The Hurricanes are owned by Tom Dundon and Eric Tulsky is their general manager.

There have been five head coaches for the Hurricanes team. The team's first head coach was Paul Maurice, who has coached for six seasons. Maurice is the team's all-time leader for the most games coached, game wins and points in the regular season, and is also all-time leader in playoff games coached and game wins. Peter Laviolette & Brind'Amour are the only coaches to have won the Stanley Cup with the Hurricanes in the 2006 & 2026 Stanley Cup Finals. None of the Hurricanes coaches have been elected into the Hockey Hall of Fame as a builder. Maurice was the head coach of the Hurricanes since the firing of Laviolette, but was replaced by Kirk Muller on November 28, 2011. Muller was relieved of coaching duties on May 5, 2014. On June 19, 2014, the Hurricanes named Bill Peters their head coach, who decided to opt out of his contract following the 2017–18 season. On May 8, 2018, the Hurricanes named assistant coach and former team captain Rod Brind'Amour as the head coach for the 2018–19 season.

== Key ==
#	Number of coaches^{[a]}
GC	Games coached
W	Wins = 2 points
L	Losses = 0 points
T	Ties = 1 point
OT	Overtime/shootout losses = 1 point^{[b]}
PTS	Points
Win%	Winning percentage
§	Name is engraved on the Stanley Cup
†	Spent entire professional head coaching career with the Hurricanes
§†	Spent entire NHL head coaching career with the Hurricanes and also Name is engraved on the Stanley Cup

== Coaches ==
Note: Statistics are correct through the 2025–26 season.

#	Name	Term^{[c]}	Regular season						Playoffs				Achievements	Reference
#	Name	Term^{[c]}	GC	W	L	T/OT	PTS	Win%	GC	W	L	Win%	Achievements	Reference
1	Paul Maurice	1997–2003	522	207	219	96	510	.489	35	17	18	.486	2001–02 Prince of Wales Trophy winner	
2	Peter Laviolette§	2003–2008	323	167	122	34	368	.570	25	16	9	.640	Stanley Cup champions (2006)	
—	Paul Maurice	2008–2011	246	116	100	30	262	.533	18	8	10	.444		
3	Kirk Muller†	2011–2014	187	80	80	27	187	.500	—	—	—	—		
4	Bill Peters	2014–2018	328	137	138	53	327	.498	—	—	—	—		
5	Rod Brind'Amour§†	2018–present	616	378	182	56	812	.659	108	63	45	.583	Stanley Cup champions (2026); Jack Adams Award (2021)	

== Notes ==
- ^{a} A running total of the number of coaches of the Hurricanes. Thus, any coach who has two or more separate terms as head coach is only counted once.
- ^{b} Before the 2005–06 season, the NHL instituted a penalty shootout for regular season games that remained tied after a five-minute overtime period, which prevented ties.
- ^{c} Each year is linked to an article about that particular NHL season.
