= Great Plains College =

Coordinates: 50°6′50.85″N 106°57′46.34″W

- Motto: Make it great
- Type: Public, post-secondary, regional college
- Established: 1973 (as Cypress Hills Regional College), 2008 (as Great Plains College after merger with Prairie West College)
- Academic affiliations: ACCC, Saskatchewan Polytechnic, U of S and U of R, PAC
- Endowment: $192,000
- President: Brad Mahon
- Students: 661 FLE
- Location: Saskatchewan, Canada
- Campus: Swift Current; Kindersley; Warman; Biggar; Maple Creek; Martensville
- Colours: Blue & yellow
- Nickname: SunDogs (Suspended 2020)
- Website: www.greatplainscollege.ca

Great Plains College is a regional college in that provides post-secondary education in the southwest and west central Saskatchewan. It currently offers post-secondary certificate, diploma and degree programs — as well as university programming, safety training, adult basic education and English language training - through campuses in Swift Current, Kindersley and Warman as well as program centres in Biggar, Maple Creek, and Martensville. Great Plains College was formed via a 2008 merger between Cypress Hills Regional College and Prairie West Regional College.

== Programs ==
The college provides certificate, diploma and degree programs in a variety of fields and trades. Post-secondary offerings include Administrative Assistant Certificate; Agricultural Science Certificate; Bachelor of Science in Nursing; Business Certificate; Business Diploma in Management; Certificate in Occupational Health, Safety and Environmental Systems; Continuing Care Assistant Certificate; Child and Youth Care; Diploma in Safety, Health and Environmental Management; Early Childhood Education; Electrician; Heavy Equipment Operator; Master of Business Administration in Community Economic Development; Power Engineering (Fourth Class and Third Class); Practical Nursing; Production Line Welding. Full listing of program offerings are available at GPC Website

A limited number of university courses are also offered at the college in partnership with the University of Saskatchewan and University of Regina.

== Campuses ==
Great Plains College has campuses in Swift Current, Warman, and Kindersley, along with program centres in Maple Creek, Biggar, and Martensville.

== History ==
Cypress Hills College and Prairie West College announced March 4, 2008, their intention to merge the two institutions into a new college to be called Great Plains College. The goal of the merger was to enhance and expand the programs and services for students who attend campuses in communities across western Saskatchewan from Warman to Maple Creek. The college also has created programs to support First Nations students and recently renewed a strategic alliance with the Office of the Treaty Commissioner to promote an inclusive educational environment.

== Athletics ==
The Swift Current campus had an athletic program known as the Great Plains SunDogs that compete in the Prairie Athletic Conference. Currently Suspended (2020)

Provincial Championships

- Men's Volleyball (2009, 2011, 2013)
- Women's Volleyball (2018, 2019)

== See also ==
- Higher education in Saskatchewan
- List of agricultural universities and colleges
- List of colleges in Canada § Saskatchewan
