= Kirk Muller =

Canadian ice hockey player (born 1966)

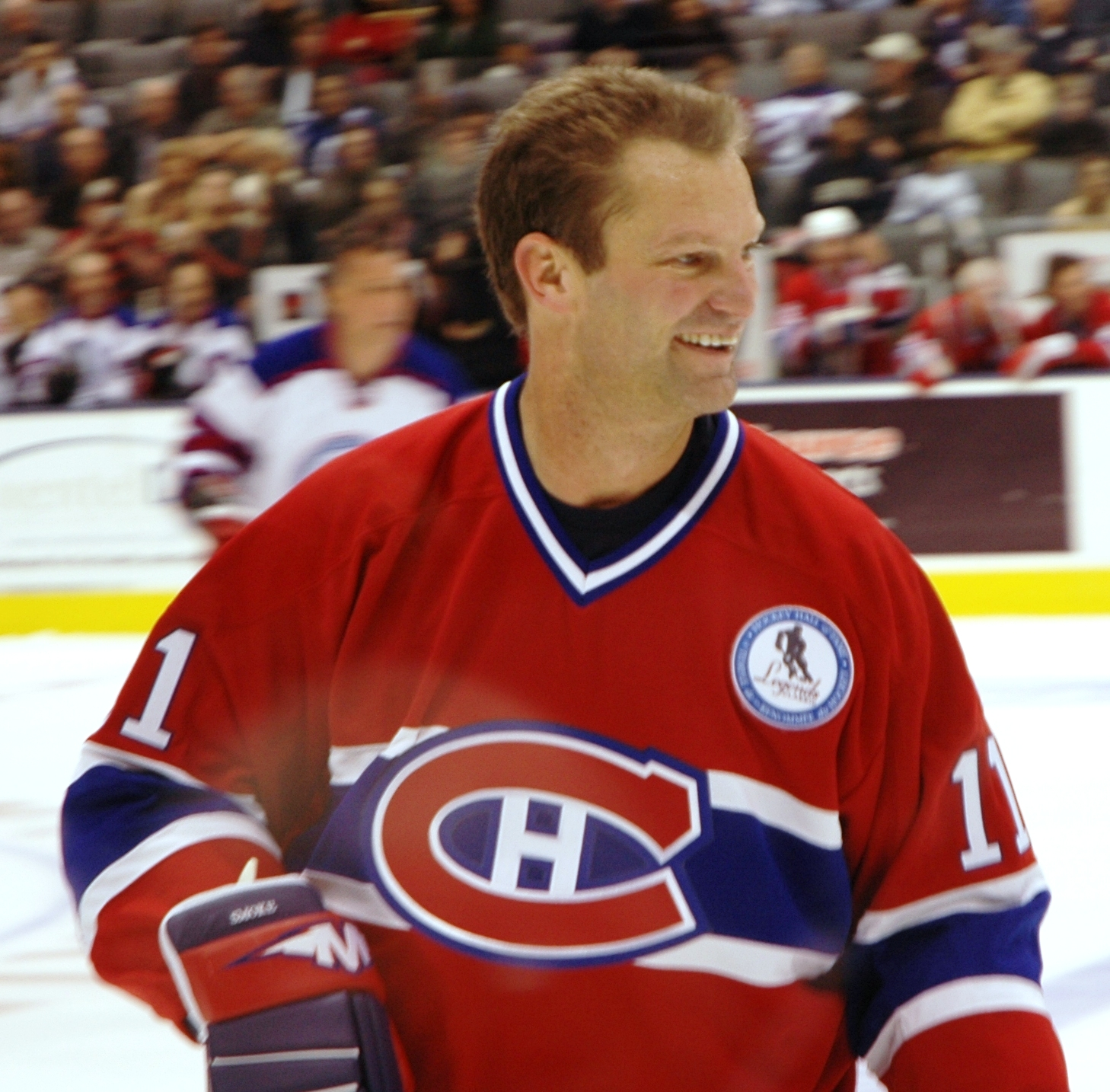
- Muller in 2008
- Born: February 8, 1966 (age 60) Kingston, Ontario, Canada
- Height: 6 ft 0 in (183 cm)
- Weight: 205 lb (93 kg; 14 st 9 lb)
- Position: Centre
- Shot: Left
- Played for: New Jersey Devils; Montreal Canadiens; New York Islanders; Toronto Maple Leafs; Florida Panthers; Dallas Stars
- Coached for: Carolina Hurricanes
- National team: Canada
- NHL draft: 2nd overall, 1984; New Jersey Devils
- Playing career: 1984–2003
- Coaching career: 2005–present
- Website: www.kirkmuller.com

Medal record

Representing Canada

World Championships
Silver medal – second place	1985 Prague	
Bronze medal – third place	1986 Moscow	
Silver medal – second place	1989 Stockholm	

Kirk Christopher Muller (born February 8, 1966) is a Canadian former professional ice hockey centre and coach. He played in the NHL for 19 seasons from 1984–85 until 2002–03 with the Dallas Stars, Florida Panthers, New Jersey Devils, New York Islanders, Toronto Maple Leafs and won the Stanley Cup in 1993 as member of the Montreal Canadiens. Muller also previously served as head coach of the Carolina Hurricanes from 2011 to 2014, and was an associate coach with the Canadiens from 2016 to 2021 following a previous stint as assistant coach with the team between 2006–2011. He was an assistant coach for the Washington Capitals from 2023-2026.

== Playing career ==
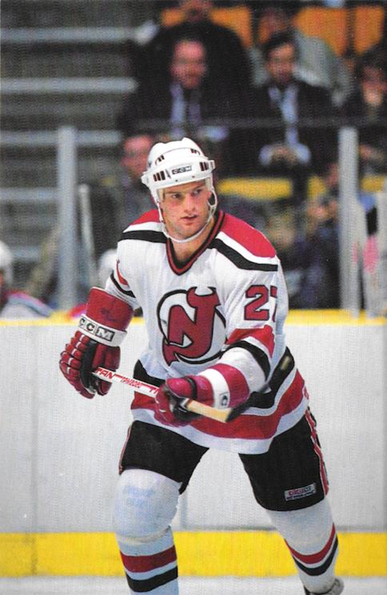
Muller with the New Jersey Devils in 1984

Muller started his junior career with the Kingston Canadians of the Ontario Hockey League, but his most successful junior seasons were with the Guelph Platers. There was a dispute in 1984 between the Platers and the Canadian Olympic Team, who wanted Muller to play with them at the 1984 Winter Olympics. The Platers owner was upset over losing Muller for so much time, but eventually they came to an agreement and Muller played in the Olympics. He was drafted second overall by the New Jersey Devils in the 1984 NHL entry draft behind Mario Lemieux. Although New Jersey had a surprisingly successful run in the 1988 playoffs, they never became a serious Stanley Cup contender while Muller was with them. After walking out of training camp on September 16, 1991, over a contract dispute, he was traded along with Roland Melanson to the Montreal Canadiens for Stéphane Richer and Tom Chorske on September 20.

Muller quickly became a fan favourite in Montreal, and he helped them win the Stanley Cup in 1993. He was traded to the New York Islanders during the 1994–95 NHL season. Initially, he was reluctant to report to the Islanders, then played a handful of games in an uninterested manner before team management decided that his poor attitude outweighed his potential contributions on the ice and barred him from the team. Eventually, the Islanders recalled Muller, but he refused to report, freeing the Islanders from their contractual obligations to pay him. Ultimately, Muller was traded at a discount to the Toronto Maple Leafs, in a three team trade that saw Muller and Don Beaupre go to the Maple Leafs, Martin Straka, Ken Belanger and the rights to Bryan Berard go to the Islanders while Damian Rhodes and the rights to Wade Redden went to the Ottawa Senators. Muller had his last 20 goal season with the Maple Leafs the next season, but he was traded to the Florida Panthers for prospect Jason Podollan as the Leafs fell out of the playoff picture.

Muller struggled in Florida, scoring just four goals in the whole 1998–99 NHL season. His last break came when he signed with the Dallas Stars in the middle of the 1999–2000 season. He spent four seasons with the Stars on a line that included Mike Keane and John MacLean. He retired at the end of the 2002–03 season.

Muller played in the NHL All-Star Game six times (1985, 1986, 1988, 1990, 1992, 1993).

== Coaching career ==
Muller began his coaching career with the Queen's University Golden Gaels in his hometown of Kingston. During 2005-06, Muller's Golden Gaels posted an 8-13-1-2 record in the Ontario University Athletics Conference.

Muller also held the title of assistant coach to Marc Habscheid with Team Canada, winning the gold medal at the 2005 Lotto Cup Tournament in Slovakia. In March 2006, he served as assistant coach to Greg Gilbert at the Under-18 World Championship.

Muller returned to the Montreal Canadiens on June 20, 2006, when he was named assistant coach of the Canadiens.

On June 27, 2011, the Nashville Predators announced that Muller had been hired as the head coach of their AHL affiliate, the Milwaukee Admirals. On November 28, 2011, Muller became coach of the Carolina Hurricanes, taking over for Paul Maurice. On May 5, 2014, Muller was relieved of his coaching duties by the Carolina Hurricanes. On May 13, 2014, Muller was signed by the St. Louis Blues as an assistant coach.

On June 2, 2016, the Montreal Canadiens rehired Muller as an associate coach.

On August 13, 2020, Muller temporarily replaced head coach Claude Julien who was hospitalized with chest pains.

On February 24, 2021, Muller along with head coach Claude Julien were fired from the Canadiens and former assistant coach Dominique Ducharme took over as interim head coach.

On June 10, 2021, Kirk Muller was named an associate coach for the Calgary Flames under head coach Darryl Sutter. He was named an assistant coach for the Washington Capitals on July 20, 2023. Muller left the Capitals at the end of their 2025-26 season.

== Records ==
- New Jersey Devils franchise record for points in a single game (6) – Oct. 29, 1986
- New Jersey Devils franchise record for assists in a single game (5) – Mar. 25, 1987

== Career statistics ==
=== Regular season and playoffs ===
			Regular season					Playoffs
Season	Team	League	GP	G	A	Pts	PIM	GP	G	A	Pts	PIM
1980–81	Kingston Voyageurs	MetJHL	42	17	37	54	5	—	—	—	—	—
1980–81	Kingston Canadians	OHL	2	0	0	0	0	2	0	1	1	0
1981–82	Kingston Canadians	OHL	67	12	39	51	27	4	5	1	6	4
1982–83	Guelph Platers	OHL	66	52	60	112	41	—	—	—	—	—
1983–84	Guelph Platers	OHL	49	31	63	94	27	—	—	—	—	—
1983–84	Canada	Intl	15	2	2	4	16	—	—	—	—	—
1984–85	New Jersey Devils	NHL	80	17	37	54	69	—	—	—	—	—
1985–86	New Jersey Devils	NHL	77	25	41	66	45	—	—	—	—	—
1986–87	New Jersey Devils	NHL	79	26	50	76	75	—	—	—	—	—
1987–88	New Jersey Devils	NHL	80	37	57	94	114	20	4	8	12	37
1988–89	New Jersey Devils	NHL	80	31	43	74	119	—	—	—	—	—
1989–90	New Jersey Devils	NHL	80	30	56	86	74	6	1	3	4	11
1990–91	New Jersey Devils	NHL	80	19	51	70	76	7	0	2	2	10
1991–92	Montreal Canadiens	NHL	78	36	41	77	86	11	4	3	7	31
1992–93	Montreal Canadiens	NHL	80	37	57	94	77	20	10	7	17	18
1993–94	Montreal Canadiens	NHL	76	23	34	57	96	7	6	2	8	4
1994–95	Montreal Canadiens	NHL	33	8	11	19	33	—	—	—	—	—
1994–95	New York Islanders	NHL	12	3	5	8	14	—	—	—	—	—
1995–96	New York Islanders	NHL	15	4	3	7	15	—	—	—	—	—
1995–96	Toronto Maple Leafs	NHL	36	9	16	25	42	6	3	2	5	0
1996–97	Toronto Maple Leafs	NHL	66	20	17	37	85	—	—	—	—	—
1996–97	Florida Panthers	NHL	10	1	2	3	4	5	1	2	3	4
1997–98	Florida Panthers	NHL	70	8	21	29	54	—	—	—	—	—
1998–99	Florida Panthers	NHL	82	4	11	15	49	—	—	—	—	—
1999–2000	Dallas Stars	NHL	47	7	15	22	24	23	2	3	5	18
2000–01	Dallas Stars	NHL	55	1	9	10	26	10	1	3	4	12
2001–02	Dallas Stars	NHL	78	10	20	30	28	—	—	—	—	—
2002–03	Dallas Stars	NHL	55	1	5	6	18	12	1	1	2	8
NHL totals			1,349	357	602	959	1,223	127	33	36	69	153

=== International ===
Year	Team	Event	GP	G	A	Pts	PIM
1984	Canada	WJC	7	2	1	3	16
1984	Canada	OG	6	2	1	3	0
1985	Canada	WC	10	2	2	4	12
1986	Canada	WC	9	4	3	7	12
1987	Canada	WC	10	2	0	2	8
1989	Canada	WC	9	6	4	10	6
Senior totals			42	16	10	26	38

== Head coaching record ==
Team	Year	Regular season						Postseason		
Team	Year	G	W	L	OTL	Pts	Finish	W	L	Result
CAR	2011–12	57	25	20	12	(62)	5th in Southeast	—	—	Missed playoffs
CAR	2012–13	48	19	25	4	42	3rd in Southeast	—	—	Missed playoffs
CAR	2013–14	82	36	35	11	83	7th in Metropolitan	—	—	Missed playoffs
Total		187	80	80	27			—	—	

== See also ==
- List of NHL players with 1,000 games played

Awards and achievements
Preceded by Dan Quinn	Jack Ferguson Award; 1982	Succeeded by Trevor Stienburg
Preceded by John MacLean	New Jersey Devils first-round draft pick 1984	Succeeded by Craig Wolanin
Sporting positions
Preceded by Mel Bridgman	New Jersey Devils captain 1987–91	Succeeded by Bruce Driver
Preceded by Guy Carbonneau	Montreal Canadiens captain 1994–95	Succeeded by Mike Keane
Preceded by Paul Maurice	Head coach of the Carolina Hurricanes; 2011–14	Succeeded by Bill Peters
