= William Pannell =

American theologian and author (1929–2024)

William E. Pannell
- Born: June 24, 1929; Sturgis, Michigan, U.S.
- Died: October 11, 2024 (aged 95)
- Education: Fort Wayne Bible College (B.A., 1951); Wayne State University (Black History Studies); University of Southern California (M.A. Social Ethics, 1980)
- Occupations: Evangelist; Theologian; Author; Professor
- Years active: 1950s–2024
- Organizations: Fuller Theological Seminary
- Known for: Longtime faculty member at Fuller Seminary
- Notable work: My Friend, the Enemy (1968); Evangelism from the Bottom Up (1992); The Coming Race Wars? A Cry for Reconciliation (1993; expanded 2021)
- Spouse: Hazel Scott Pannell (m. 1955–2021)
- Children: Two

William E. Pannell (June 24, 1929 – October 11, 2024) was an American evangelical theologian, author, and professor of preaching at Fuller Theological Seminary. He wrote My Friend, the Enemy (1968), Evangelism from the Bottom Up (1992), and The Coming Race Wars? A Cry for Reconciliation (1993), and wrote and spoke extensively about race and evangelical Christianity.

== Early life and education ==
William E. Pannell was born in Sturgis, Michigan, on June 24, 1929. He was raised in a Plymouth Brethren family in suburban Detroit. He became an evangelical Christian during his junior year of high school and went on to attend Fort Wayne Bible College, where he graduated in 1951. Pannell later studied Black history at Wayne State University and earned an M.A. in Social Ethics from the University of Southern California in 1980.

== Early career and activism ==
After graduating from Fort Wayne Bible College, Pannell worked as an evangelist and pastor. From 1955 to 1965, he was an assistant pastor in Detroit while also working as an area youth director for Brethren Assembly youth. In 1964, he was appointed director of leadership training for Youth for Christ, where he emphasized the need for urban ministry and social action. According to the scholar Isaac Sharp, Pannell left Youth for Christ in 1968 in part because of disagreements over the organization’s response to racial issues. From 1968 to 1974 he worked with Tom Skinner Associates as associate evangelist and vice president.

In 1968, Pannell published My Friend, the Enemy, in which he criticized racism within white evangelical Christianity. In it, he argued that conservative Christianity perpetuated the myth of white supremacy and often conflated faith with American patriotism and conservative politics.

== Academic career ==
In 1971, Pannell became the first African American to serve on Fuller Theological Seminary's Board of Trustees. Three years later, in 1974, he joined Fuller's faculty as an assistant professor of evangelism and director of the Black Pastors' Program (later the African American Church Studies Program). He taught at Fuller for approximately 40 years.

In 1992, he was appointed as the Arthur DeKruyter/Christ Church Oak Brook Professor of Preaching, a role he held until 2000. He also served as Dean of the chapel from 1992 to 1998. In 2015, Fuller Seminary renamed its Center for African American Church Studies as the William E. Pannell Center for Black Church Studies.

== Contributions and legacy ==
Pannell served on the boards of Youth for Christ USA and the Academy of Evangelism, which he also chaired from 1983 to 1984. He was a speaker at evangelism conferences and a lecturer at Christian colleges and universities. He was also quoted in the media regarding issues related to the Black church and to race relations.

Pannell wrote dozens of journal articles and book chapters, and he authored three full-length books, including My Friend, the Enemy (1968), Evangelism from the Bottom Up (1992), and The Coming Race Wars? A Cry for Reconciliation (1993). In his writing, Pannell criticized racism within American evangelicalism and called for greater engagement by evangelical Christians with racial inequality.

== Personal life and death ==
Pannell was married to Hazel Scott Pannell from 1955 until her death in 2021. They had two sons together. Pannell died on October 11, 2024, at the age of 95.

== Publications ==
- My Friend, the Enemy. Word Books (1968).
- Evangelism from the Bottom Up. Zondervan (1992). ISBN 9780310522218.
- The Coming Race Wars? A Cry for Reconciliation. Zondervan (1993). ISBN 9780310381815.
