= John Dekker =

Dutch Christian missionary (1929–2024)

John "Tolibaga" Theodorus Johannes Dekker (28 December 1929 – 9 April 2024) was a Dutch-born Christian missionary.

== Biography ==
Dekker was born and raised in The Netherlands before moving to Canada in 1952. He studied at Prairie Bible College, and later at the Summer Institute of Linguistics, Grace Theological Seminary, and Reformed Theological Seminary.

He married Helen in 1958 and the two of them served as missionaries with Regions Beyond Missionary Union. They engaged in medical, linguistic, and church work among the Lani people of the Toli Valley in Western New Guinea from 1960 to 1981. As a result of their ministry, the Christian population among the Lani grew to 13,000.

In 1985, Dekker wrote Torches of Joy which tells the story of his life and ministry to the Dani (Lani). After his retirement, Dekker lived in Montrose, Colorado.

John Dekker died on 9 April 2024, at the age of 94. He was the father of the Christian novelist Ted Dekker.
