= Millar College of the Bible =

Christian college in Saskatchewan, Canada

- Former name: Millar Memorial Bible Institute
- Type: Private
- Established: 1932
- Religious affiliation: Evangelical Christian (Non-affiliated)
- President: Phil Ruten
- Students: 175 (Pambrun Campus)
- Location: Pambrun, Saskatchewan, Canada; 49°56′9″N 107°27′26″W
- Campus: Rural
- Sporting affiliations: Prairie Athletic Conference
- Website: www.millarcollege.ca

Millar College of the Bible (formally called the Millar Memorial Bible Institute in its act of incorporation) is a three-campus post secondary institution established in 1932, and recognized by the government of Saskatchewan as an educational institution in 1944. The school is a private nonprofit institution recognized under a private act offering post secondary education.

The vision of the college is "to develop passionate, relevant servants of Jesus Christ who are shaped by the entire Scriptures."

== History ==
William Millar came to Canada to preach after becoming a Christian under the preaching of Dwight L. Moody in Scotland. Millar began a Bible school in Moose Jaw, Saskatchewan, and in 1932 the school moved to Pambrun, SK. William Dickson and a young Herbert W. Peeler were asked to help with the teaching. In January 1933, Millar died, leaving Peeler in charge of the school, which was renamed Millar Memorial Bible Institute. Herbert W. Peeler directed the school for over fifty years until he retired.

Those instrumentally involved were William Dickson and Herbert W. Peeler, both of Pambrun, and Charles Williamson of Glen Bain. The focus of the school was to train workers for vocational and non-vocational Evangelical ministry in Western Canada and overseas.

== Campuses ==
The main campus in Pambrun, Saskatchewan is the oldest and largest of the three campuses. Educational opportunities include biblical languages, fine arts, athletics, and Bible backgrounds. An extension campus was established in 2012, in partnership with Sunnybrae Bible Camp in Tappen, BC. In 2021, a third campus was established in Winnipeg, Manitoba.

== Programs ==
The college offers a one year certificate, a two year Christian Ministry Diploma, a three year Bachelor of Biblical Studies, and a four year Bachelor of Arts in Biblical Studies. A graduate program launched in 2019, offering a Master of Biblical Studies designed for those already active in ministry.

== Athletics ==
The Millar Edge have an athletic program in the Prairie Athletic Conference. The team competes in basketball, futsal, outdoor soccer, and volleyball. The Edge also have a hockey team that competes against teams in the local area.

The team has also participated in badminton, golf, table tennis, and curling in the past. The Edge are former members of the Alberta Colleges Athletic League.
