= Rod Brind'Amour =

Canadian ice hockey player and coach (born 1970)

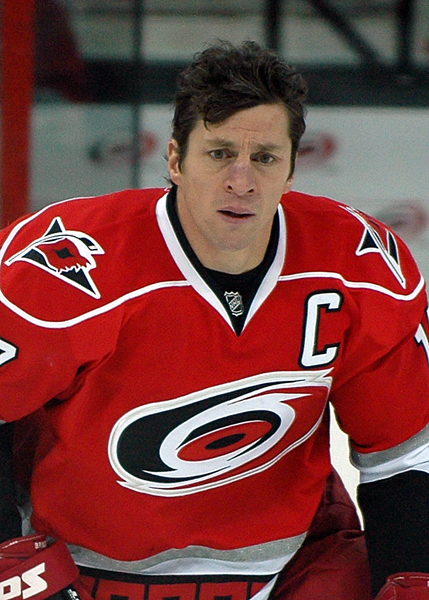
- Brind'Amour with the Carolina Hurricanes in January 2009
- Born: August 9, 1970 (age 56) Ottawa, Ontario, Canada
- Height: 6 ft 1 in (185 cm)
- Weight: 205 lb (93 kg; 14 st 9 lb)
- Position: Centre
- Shot: Left
- Played for: St. Louis Blues; Philadelphia Flyers; Carolina Hurricanes; Kloten Flyers
- Current NHL coach: Carolina Hurricanes
- National team: Canada
- NHL draft: 9th overall, 1988; St. Louis Blues
- Playing career: 1989–2010
- Coaching career: 2011–present

Roderic Jean Brind'Amour (/ˈbrɪndəˌmʊər/; born August 9, 1970) is a Canadian professional ice hockey coach and former player who is the head coach for the Carolina Hurricanes of the National Hockey League (NHL). Nicknamed "Rod the Bod" and "Mr. Hurricane", Brind'Amour has played or coached for the Hurricanes in all but two of their 104 playoff wins as of the end of the 2025–26 season. He is one of four people to have won the Stanley Cup with the same team as captain and head coach, the first to do so in the league's expansion era, and is the 14th individual to win as a coach and player for any team.

Brind'Amour played ice hockey for Michigan State and was selected in the first round, ninth overall, by the St. Louis Blues in the 1988 NHL entry draft. Brind'Amour later played for the Philadelphia Flyers and the Hurricanes, the latter with whom he captained to the Stanley Cup in 2006, marking the first championship in franchise history. He won the Frank J. Selke Trophy for his defensive play as a forward in consecutive seasons in the 2005–06 and 2006–07 seasons. He retired in 2010, having recorded over 450 goals and 700 assists in over 1,400 games. Internationally, he represented Canada on six occasions, which saw them win the Ice Hockey World Championship in 1994.

After retiring, he was hired by the Hurricanes to work in player development. He became an assistant coach in 2011 before being hired as head coach in 2018. He led them to the 2019 Stanley Cup playoffs in his first season, their first appearance in ten years that saw them reach the Eastern Conference finals. The 2020–21 season saw them win a division championship for the first time in 15 years and saw him awarded the Jack Adams Award, the first Hurricanes coach to be awarded the honor. The Hurricanes reached the playoffs in the first eight seasons under Brind'Amour, which culminated with their appearance and victory in the 2026 Stanley Cup Final.

== Early life ==
Brind'Amour was born in Ottawa but raised in Prince Rupert and Campbell River, British Columbia. One particular idol of his growing up was Guy Lafleur.

He played for the Notre Dame Hounds team which won the 1988 Centennial Cup, with Brind'Amour selected as the tournament Most Valuable Player. He was coached there by Barry MacKenzie whom he credits as one of his biggest influences. Brind'Amour was drafted by the St. Louis Blues in the first round, ninth overall, of the 1988 NHL entry draft. He played the next season at Michigan State University.

He became known for working out constantly, earning the nickname "Rod the Bod". During his time at Michigan State, Brind'Amour would go from a game directly into the weight room, where he would undertake a strenuous workout. Spartans head coach Ron Mason said Brind'Amour's workouts became so intense they would turn the lights out on him, and when that failed to work, they would padlock the room to bar his entry.

== Playing career ==
=== St. Louis Blues (1988–1991) ===
At the conclusion of the 1988–89 Central Collegiate Hockey Association (CCHA) season with the Spartans, Brind'Amour joined the Blues during the 1989 Stanley Cup playoffs. He made his debut in game five of the Blues' division semifinals against the Minnesota North Stars, and scored a goal on his first shot. In the following 1989–90 season, Brind'Amour scored 27 points in the Blues' first 24 games and finished third on the Blues with 26 goals. He had five goals and eight assists in the playoff run that ended in the second round. For his efforts, Brind'Amour was selected to the 1989–90 All-Rookie Team.

In his second season, he had 17 goals with 32 assists. Around 1991, the Blues were looking to deal Brind'Amour, which started with them offering him and Curtis Joseph as compensation to the New Jersey Devils when the Blues signed Brendan Shanahan to an offer sheet. However, the Devils wanted Scott Stevens, and when it came to arbitration, they ruled in favour of the Devils. Eventually, the Blues found a way to trade Brind'Amour.

=== Philadelphia Flyers (1991–2000) ===
Brind'Amour was traded to the Philadelphia Flyers (along with Dan Quinn) in exchange for Murray Baron and Ron Sutter just before the start of the 1991–92 season. He spent his years in Philadelphia as an alternate to captain Kevin Dineen and then Eric Lindros, filling in as captain when the latter was out of the lineup. It was there he started his reputation of being one of the best shutdown centres of the NHL.

When the Flyers faced the Pittsburgh Penguins in the first round of the 1997 playoffs, Brind'Amour scored two short-handed goals during a single power play. The Flyers made it to the Stanley Cup Final, which they lost to the Detroit Red Wings.

During his stint with Philadelphia, Brind'Amour was considered one of the NHL's "ironmen" with a consecutive games streak of 484 played, a Flyers franchise record. Brind'Amour saw his streak end in the 1999–2000 season due to hairline fractures in his left foot that saw him put on injured reserve on October 2 that resulted in him not playing until December 22.

He culminated his career as a Flyer after 633 games with franchise records as the sixth all-time in assists with 366, ninth all time in goals with 235 and seventh overall in points with 601.

He was inducted into the Flyers Hall of Fame on November 23, 2015, in a game against the Carolina Hurricanes, with whom he was an assistant coach at the time.

In 2024, he was inducted into the Philadelphia Sports Hall of Fame.

=== Carolina Hurricanes (2000–2010) ===
In late 1999, the Carolina Hurricanes were on the cusp of trading Keith Primeau, who had held out from playing since the start of the 1999–2000 season. After a failed trade to the Phoenix Coyotes that would've got them Keith Tkachuk, the Hurricanes found a suitable team to trade Primeau the following month. On January 23, 2000, the Hurricanes traded Primeau (alongside a fifth-round pick) to the Philadelphia Flyers for Brind'Amour, goaltender Jean-Marc Pelletier and a second-round pick.

Brind'Amour formed one-third of Carolina's "BBC Line", also featuring Bates Battaglia and Erik Cole, during the Hurricanes' run to the Stanley Cup Final in 2002.

Brind'Amour was named captain of the Hurricanes before the 2005–06 season to succeed Ron Francis. He had 31 goals and 39 assists that season and led the Hurricanes to the Stanley Cup Final against the Edmonton Oilers. He scored two of his three Cup Final goals in game one, which included the game-winner with less than a minute remaining; the Hurricanes won the series in seven games for their first championship. During the subsequent off-season, Brind'Amour signed a five-year contract extension with the Hurricanes.

The 2006–07 season saw him reach two milestones for his career. On November 4, 2006, Brind'Amour recorded his 1,000th career NHL point, doing so on an assist on the road against the Ottawa Senators in his 1,202nd game as the 71st player to reach the milestone. On February 17, 2007, he scored his 400th career goal against the Montreal Canadiens. He won 59.3 percent of his faceoffs that year while recording 82 points in 78 games and narrowly beat out Samuel Påhlsson for the Selke Trophy.

On February 14, 2008, in a game against the Pittsburgh Penguins, Brind'Amour tore his anterior cruciate ligament (ACL) in the first period, ending his season. However, Brind'Amour would return for the 2008–09 season, playing in 80 games while recording 16 goals and 35 assists as the Hurricanes reached the Eastern Conference finals.

On January 20, 2010, Brind'Amour was replaced as Hurricanes captain by Eric Staal, previously an alternate captain. Brind'Amour then served as an alternate captain for the remainder of the season. Following the conclusion of the season, Brind'Amour retired from professional hockey, having played 1,484 career NHL games, after which he moved into Hurricanes' management as a director of forwards development. His number 17 jersey was retired in a ceremony on February 18, 2011. The ceremony took place prior to a game against the Philadelphia Flyers, which at the time was coached by Peter Laviolette. Thus the two teams Brind'Amour spent the bulk of his career with, as well as the coach he won the Stanley Cup with, were present to honour him. It is the third number to be officially retired by the Hurricanes since moving to Raleigh, North Carolina, after Ron Francis' number 10 and Glen Wesley's number 2. Brind'Amour was among the last few players in the NHL who had also played in the league during the 1980s. At the time of his retirement, he finished his professional career 16th in all-time NHL games played by a skater.

== Coaching career ==
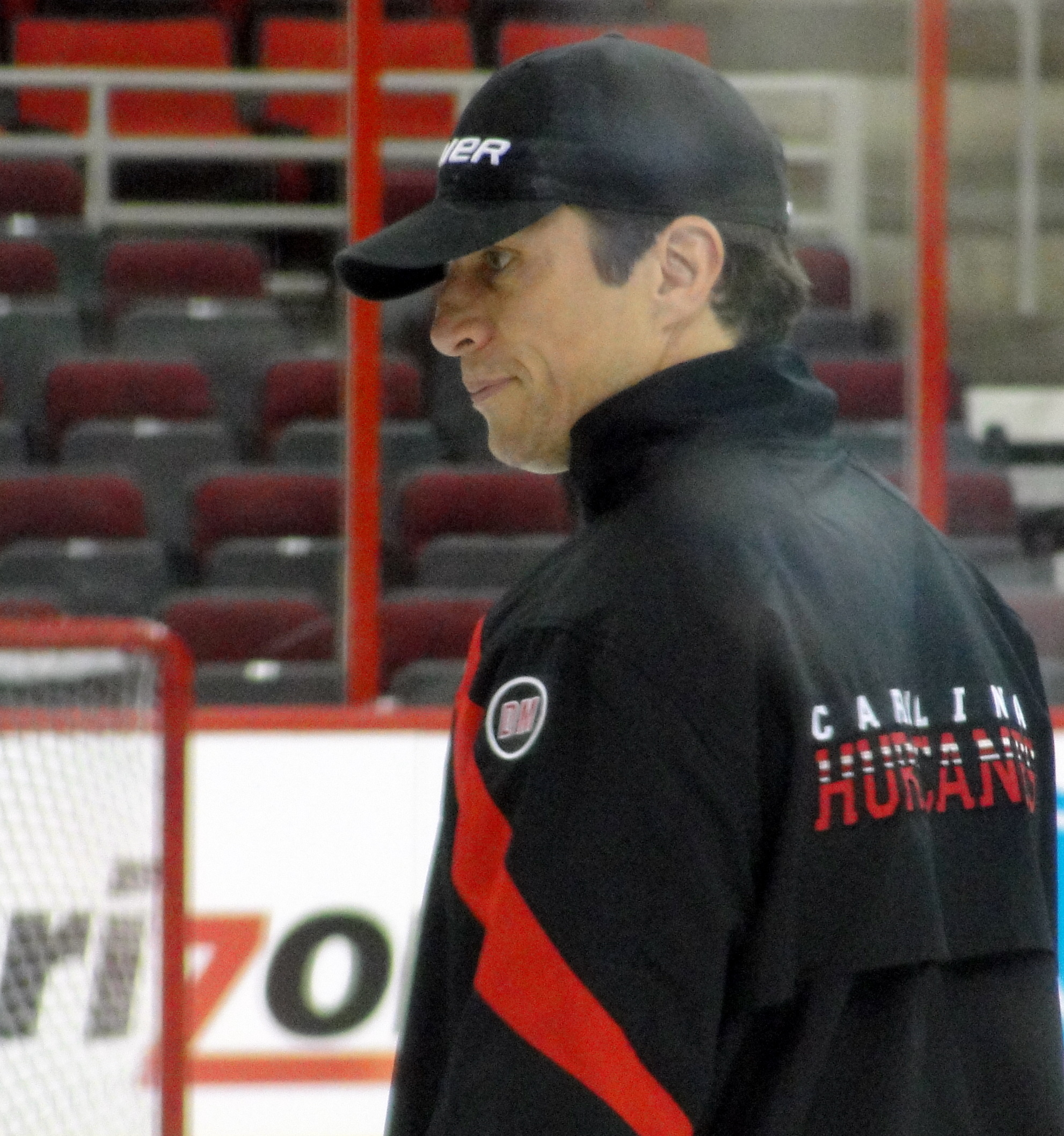
Brind'Amour as an assistant coach for the Carolina Hurricanes in December 2011

On June 7, 2011, Brind'Amour was introduced by the Carolina Hurricanes as their assistant coach and development coach, retaining his role in developing the franchise's forwards while also spending time behind the bench in the NHL.

Brind'Amour represented the Hurricanes in a ceremony before the Charlotte Checkers' first home game as Carolina's new American Hockey League (AHL) affiliate.

On May 8, 2018, Brind'Amour was hired as the Hurricanes' head coach. In his first season as head coach, Brind'Amour guided the team to its first playoff berth in a decade, leading them to the Eastern Conference finals where they were swept by the Boston Bruins.

On April 26, 2021, Brind'Amour became the first head coach in Hurricanes history to lead the team to the playoffs in three consecutive seasons. On June 17, Brind'Amour agreed to a three-year contract extension with the Hurricanes. That same day, Brind'Amour was awarded the Jack Adams Award, given annually to the NHL's coach of the year.

On December 28, 2024, Brind'Amour became the fastest coach to 300 wins in NHL history, achieving the mark in 488 games, eight games faster than Bruce Boudreau. Brind'Amour and Boudreau are the only NHL coaches to achieve 300 wins in less than 500 games.

In 2025–26, Brind'Amour and the Hurricanes won the Metropolitan Division for the first time in three years. Carolina defeated the Ottawa Senators, Philadelphia Flyers, and Montreal Canadiens to win the Prince of Wales Trophy for the first time since 2006, when Brind'Amour was captain. In the 2026 Stanley Cup Final, the Hurricanes defeated the Western Conference champion Vegas Golden Knights four games to two, winning the Stanley Cup for the second time in franchise history. With the championship, Brind'Amour became the fourth person in NHL history to win the Stanley Cup with the same team as both captain and head coach, the first in the expansion era, and the 14th individual to win as a coach and player for any team.

== Personal life ==
Brind'Amour was married to Kelle Sullivan Gardner, with whom he had three children. The couple divorced in 2004.

On July 10, 2010, Brind'Amour married Amy Biedenbach, the daughter of former North Carolina State University basketball standout and former UNC Asheville men's basketball coach, Eddie Biedenbach. The couple have one son together.

Brind'Amour's oldest son, Skyler, was drafted by the Edmonton Oilers 177th overall in the 2017 NHL entry draft, and is a member of the Carolina Hurricanes organization.

== Career statistics ==
=== Regular season and playoffs ===
			Regular season					Playoffs
Season	Team	League	GP	G	A	Pts	PIM	GP	G	A	Pts	PIM
1986–87	Notre Dame Hounds AAA	SMHL	33	38	50	88	66	—	—	—	—	—
1987–88	Notre Dame Hounds	SJHL	56	46	61	107	136	—	—	—	—	—
1987–88	Notre Dame Hounds	Cen-Cup	—	—	—	—	—	5	5	9	14	4
1988–89	Michigan State University	CCHA	42	27	32	59	63	—	—	—	—	—
1988–89	St. Louis Blues	NHL	—	—	—	—	—	5	2	0	2	4
1989–90	St. Louis Blues	NHL	79	26	35	61	46	12	5	8	13	6
1990–91	St. Louis Blues	NHL	78	17	32	49	93	13	2	5	7	10
1991–92	Philadelphia Flyers	NHL	80	33	44	77	100	—	—	—	—	—
1992–93	Philadelphia Flyers	NHL	81	37	49	86	89	—	—	—	—	—
1993–94	Philadelphia Flyers	NHL	84	35	62	97	85	—	—	—	—	—
1994–95	Philadelphia Flyers	NHL	48	12	27	39	33	15	6	9	15	8
1995–96	Philadelphia Flyers	NHL	82	26	61	87	110	12	2	5	7	6
1996–97	Philadelphia Flyers	NHL	82	27	32	59	41	19	13	8	21	10
1997–98	Philadelphia Flyers	NHL	82	36	38	74	54	5	2	2	4	7
1998–99	Philadelphia Flyers	NHL	82	24	50	74	47	6	1	3	4	0
1999–00	Philadelphia Flyers	NHL	12	5	3	8	4	—	—	—	—	—
1999–00	Carolina Hurricanes	NHL	33	4	10	14	22	—	—	—	—	—
2000–01	Carolina Hurricanes	NHL	79	20	36	56	47	6	1	3	4	6
2001–02	Carolina Hurricanes	NHL	81	23	32	55	40	23	4	8	12	16
2002–03	Carolina Hurricanes	NHL	48	14	23	37	37	—	—	—	—	—
2003–04	Carolina Hurricanes	NHL	78	12	26	38	28	—	—	—	—	—
2004–05	Kloten Flyers	NLA	2	2	1	3	0	5	2	4	6	6
2005–06	Carolina Hurricanes	NHL	78	31	39	70	68	25	12	6	18	16
2006–07	Carolina Hurricanes	NHL	78	26	56	82	46	—	—	—	—	—
2007–08	Carolina Hurricanes	NHL	59	19	32	51	38	—	—	—	—	—
2008–09	Carolina Hurricanes	NHL	80	16	35	51	36	18	1	3	4	8
2009–10	Carolina Hurricanes	NHL	80	9	10	19	36	—	—	—	—	—
NHL totals			1,484	452	732	1,184	1,100	159	51	60	111	97

=== International ===
Medal record

Men's Ice hockey

Representing Canada

World Championships
Gold medal – first place	1994 Italy	

Year	Team	Event	Results	GP	G	A	Pts	PIM
1989	Canada	WJC	4th	7	2	3	5	4
1992	Canada	WC	8th	6	1	1	2	4
1993	Canada	WC	4th	8	3	1	4	6
1994	Canada	WC	1st place, gold medalist(s)	8	4	2	6	2
1996	Canada	WCH	2nd	7	1	2	3	0
1998	Canada	OLY	4th	6	1	2	3	0
Junior totals				7	2	3	5	4
Senior totals				35	10	8	18	12

== Head coaching record ==
Team	Year	Regular season						Postseason			
Team	Year	G	W	L	OTL	Pts	Finish	W	L	Win%	Result
CAR	2018–19	82	46	29	7	99	4th in Metropolitan	8	7	.533	Lost in conference finals (BOS)
CAR	2019–20	68	38	25	5	81	4th in Metropolitan	4	4	.500	Lost in first round (BOS)
CAR	2020–21	56	36	12	8	80	1st in Central	5	6	.455	Lost in second round (TBL)
CAR	2021–22	82	54	20	8	116	1st in Metropolitan	7	7	.500	Lost in second round (NYR)
CAR	2022–23	82	52	21	9	113	1st in Metropolitan	8	7	.533	Lost in conference finals (FLA)
CAR	2023–24	82	52	23	7	111	2nd in Metropolitan	6	5	.545	Lost in second round (NYR)
CAR	2024–25	82	47	30	5	99	2nd in Metropolitan	9	6	.600	Lost in conference finals (FLA)
CAR	2025–26	82	53	22	7	113	1st in Metropolitan	16	3	.842	Won Stanley Cup (VGK)
Total		616	378	182	56			63	45	.583	8 playoff appearances 1 Stanley Cup title

== Awards and honours ==
Award	Year	Ref
College
All-CCHA Rookie Team	1989	
NHL
As player
NHL All-Star Game	1992	
Stanley Cup champion	2006	
Frank J. Selke Trophy	2006, 2007	
As coach
Jack Adams Award	2021	
Stanley Cup champion	2026	

== See also ==
- List of NHL players with 1,000 points
- List of NHL players with 1,000 games played

Awards and achievements
Preceded by Keith Osborne	St. Louis Blues first-round draft pick 1988	Succeeded by Jason Marshall
Preceded by John DePourcq	CCHA Rookie of the Year; 1988–89	Succeeded by David Roberts
Preceded by Pelle Eklund	Winner of the Bobby Clarke Trophy; 1992	Succeeded by Mark Recchi
Preceded by Ron Francis	Carolina Hurricanes captain 2005–2010	Succeeded by Eric Staal
Preceded by Kris Draper	Winner of the Frank J. Selke Trophy; 2006, 2007	Succeeded by Pavel Datsyuk
Preceded by Bill Peters	Head coach of the Carolina Hurricanes; 2018–present	Incumbent
Preceded by Bruce Cassidy	Jack Adams Award; 2021	Succeeded by Darryl Sutter
