= Bill Peters (ice hockey) =

Canadian ice hockey coach

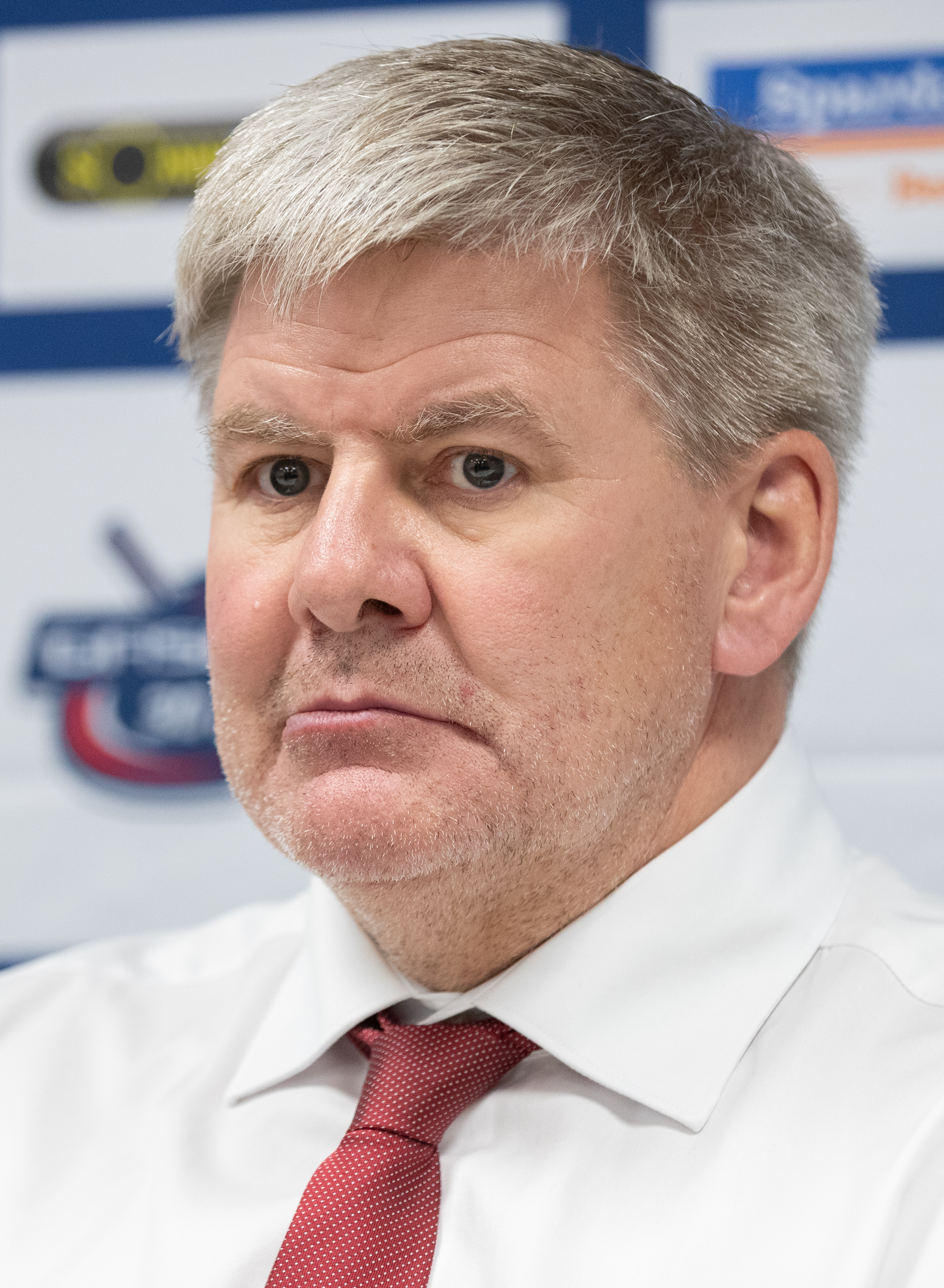
- Peters in 2025
- Born: January 13, 1965 (age 61) Three Hills, Alberta, Canada
- Current DEL coach: Augsburger Panther
- Coached for: Carolina Hurricanes; Calgary Flames; Avtomobilist Yekaterinburg
- Coaching career: 1989–present

William Robert Peters (born January 13, 1965) is a Canadian professional ice hockey coach and former college player who is currently the head coach of Augsburger Panther of the Deutsche Eishockey Liga (DEL). He has served as head coach of the Carolina Hurricanes and Calgary Flames of the National Hockey League (NHL), Avtomobilist Yekaterinburg of the Kontinental Hockey League (KHL), as well as the Canada men's national ice hockey team.

== Early life and career ==
Peters was born in Three Hills, Alberta, where he spent the first ten years of his life living on a cattle and grain farm. He then moved to Killam, where he began playing both ice hockey and baseball. At age 15, Peters broke his knee when he was run over on his bicycle by a car, an injury that hindered his intention to play professionally. He played two seasons for the Augustana Vikings, and one for the Red Deer College Kings, during which he won the 1989 Alberta Colleges Athletics Conference championship under future mentor Mike Babcock. After this, he began his managerial career coaching Killam's Junior B team at age 24 before moving to Texas for his wife's nursing job. Peters helped open San Antonio's first ice hockey rink, and held hockey schools every summer across the United States and Canada. He also played his only game as a professional in Texas as a last-minute replacement in 1996 for the Central Hockey League's San Antonio Iguanas.

== Coaching career ==
=== Early career ===
Peters began his career during the 1989–90 season with his hometown Killam Wheat Kings as head coach. Starting in the 1996–97 season, he was named as an assistant coach for the Spokane Chiefs of the Western Hockey League (WHL). He served in that role through the end of the 2001–02 season. Peters then took his first head coaching job with the University of Lethbridge and guided its Pronghorns ice hockey team for three seasons from 2002–03 through 2004–05.

=== Spokane Chiefs ===
In June 2005, Peters was named head coach of the WHL's Spokane Chiefs. His team posted a 25–39–8 record in his first season before taking a step forward in 2006–07 season when the team posted a 36–28–8 regular season record and qualified for the WHL playoffs for the first time since 2004.

Spokane posted a franchise-best 50 regular season wins and 107 points in the 2007–08 season en route to a third-place finish in the WHL's Western Conference. The Chiefs went on to win 16 of 21 playoff games to claim the Ed Chynoweth Cup as WHL champions. Peters then guided the Chiefs to four consecutive victories to claim the Memorial Cup as Canadian Hockey League champions. In his three seasons with the Chiefs, Peters posted a 111–82–23 regular season record.

=== Rockford IceHogs ===
After the Chiefs won the 2008 Memorial Cup, Peters left Spokane and was named head coach of the Rockford IceHogs of the American Hockey League (AHL) on August 1, 2008. The IceHogs posted consecutive 40-win seasons and qualified for the Calder Cup playoffs in each of Peters' first two years with the team, going 40–34–6 in 2008–09 and 44–30–6 in 2009–10. In his final season with Rockford, Peters led the second-youngest team in the AHL to a 38–33–9 record.

Eight players who played for Rockford during Peters' tenure went on to win the Stanley Cup with the Chicago Blackhawks in 2010 or 2013: Niklas Hjalmarsson, Jordan Hendry, Antti Niemi, Corey Crawford, Kris Versteeg, Bryan Bickell, Nick Leddy, Brandon Bollig and Ben Smith.

=== Detroit Red Wings ===
On July 8, 2011, the NHL's Detroit Red Wings named Peters as an assistant coach. Peters worked primarily with the team's defencemen and penalty-killing units.

=== Carolina Hurricanes ===
On June 19, 2014, the Carolina Hurricanes announced that Peters had been hired to replace the vacant head coach position, previously held by Kirk Muller. On April 20, 2018, Peters resigned from his position.

=== Calgary Flames ===
On April 23, 2018, Peters was hired as head coach of the Calgary Flames. In his first season, he led the Flames to their first division title in 13 years, and the second-most wins (50) and points (107) in franchise history, behind only the Stanley Cup-winning 1988–89 Calgary Flames. However, despite winning game one of their first round playoff series against the Colorado Avalanche, they were upset and eliminated in five games.

==== Racism controversy and resignation ====
On November 25, 2019, an accusation of racism was made by former Rockford IceHogs player Akim Aliu on Twitter, alluding to racial profanities Peters directed towards him. Following this accusation, on November 26, a new Twitter accusation emerged from former Carolina Hurricanes player Michal Jordán, alleging that Peters had kicked him and punched another unnamed player during a game. On November 27, Peters did not take his place behind the Flames' bench for a game against the Buffalo Sabres, pending the outcome of an investigation by the Flames' management. Peters submitted his resignation on November 29, and Geoff Ward was named the interim head coach.

=== Avtomobilist Yekaterinburg ===
In April 2020 Peters was hired to be the coach of Russian hockey club Avtomobilist Yekaterinburg.

In the midst of his second season with Avtomobilist, on November 30, 2021, he was relieved of his duties.

== International coaching career ==
Peters served as head coach of the gold medal-winning Canada men's national under-18 ice hockey team at the 2008 Ivan Hlinka Memorial Tournament. That under-18 team included future NHL stars Taylor Hall, Ryan O'Reilly, Brayden Schenn, Evander Kane and Matt Duchene, among others.

At the senior international level, Peters also served as head coach of Canada's gold medal-winning team at the 2016 IIHF World Championship, and he was an assistant coach for Canada's championship teams at the 2015 IIHF World Championship and 2016 World Cup of Hockey. On April 9, 2018, Hockey Canada announced that Peters would serve as Canada's head coach at the 2018 IIHF World Championship.

== Head coaching record ==
Team	Year	Regular season						Postseason			
Team	Year	G	W	L	OTL	Pts	Finish	W	L	Win%	Result
CAR	2014–15	82	30	41	11	71	8th in Metropolitan	—	—	—	Missed playoffs
CAR	2015–16	82	35	31	16	86	6th in Metropolitan	—	—	—	Missed playoffs
CAR	2016–17	82	36	31	15	87	7th in Metropolitan	—	—	—	Missed playoffs
CAR	2017–18	82	36	35	11	83	6th in Metropolitan	—	—	—	Missed playoffs
CGY	2018–19	82	50	25	7	107	1st in Pacific	1	4	.200	Lost in First Round
CGY	2019–20	28	12	12	4	(28)	(resigned)	—	—	—	—
Total		438	199	175	64			1	4	.200	

Preceded by Kirk Muller	Head coach of the Carolina Hurricanes; 2014–2018	Succeeded by Rod Brind'Amour
Preceded by Glen Gulutzan	Head coach of the Calgary Flames; 2018–2019	Succeeded by Geoff Ward; Interim
