= Nipawin Bible College =

Christian college in Saskatchewan, Canada

Coordinates: 53°20′3.97″N 104°1′50.17″W

- Other name: NBC
- Former names: Two Rivers Bible Institute (1934-1957); Nipawin Bible Institute (1957-2007)
- Type: Private
- Established: 1934
- President: Jason Elford
- Faculty: 5
- Administrative staff: 11
- Students: 50
- Location: Nipawin, Saskatchewan, Canada
- Campus: Rural 110 acres (45 ha)
- Colours: Blue & gold
- Nickname: Royals
- Website: www.nipawin.org

Nipawin Bible College is an evangelical nondenominational training school on a 110 acres (45 ha) site just south of Nipawin, Saskatchewan, Canada. Jason Elford is currently the President at the college.

== History ==
Nipawin Bible College, incorporated as Two Rivers Bible Institute (TRBI), was founded in 1934 at the height of the Great Depression. Its first campus was located at the fork where the Leather River joins with the Carrot River. In 1957, after several years of damaging floods, the school relocated to its present campus 1-mile (1.6 km) south of Nipawin, Saskatchewan.

== Campus ==
Nipawin Bible College owns 110 acres (45 ha) of land just south of Nipawin, Saskatchewan. Of this land approximately 30 acres is developed for Campus use.

The campus uses five main buildings:

- Art Linsey Education Centre (classrooms, library, chapel, administration, book store)
- Rempel Auditorium (housing the Leppington Student Centre and gymnasium)
- Snider Hall (ladies residence)
- Baxter Hall (men's residence)
- Dining Hall (with fitness centre in basement)

Four single home dwellings sit on campus, along with a four-unit complex. Additionally, a four-unit townhouse building called "Evans Place" sits close to the Baxter Hall. There is a mobile home on campus as well. In December 2014, Nipawin Bible College went online with what was then tied for the largest array of solar panels in the province of Saskatchewan. At over 7000 square feet and producing 150,000 kilowatt-hours (kWh) of electricity, the college is able to save approximately $17,000 annually at 2015 electricity rates.

== Programs ==
NBC offers programs from 1 to 4 years. Available programs are Foundations For Life, Christian Ministry Diploma, Bachelor of Christian Ministry, Bachelor of Arts in Biblical Studies, Bachelor of Arts in Pastoral Ministry, and Certificate of Selected Studies.

== Athletics ==
The colleges athletic team, Nipawin Royals are a former member of the Prairie Athletic Conference in indoor and outdoor soccer. Currently the school competes in the Nipawin Indoor Soccer League and on campus intramural leagues.

PAC Provincial Championships:

- Men's Indoor Soccer/Futsal (1) (2011)
- Men's Outdoor Soccer (1) (2010)
