= Michal Jordán =

Czech ice hockey player (born 1990)

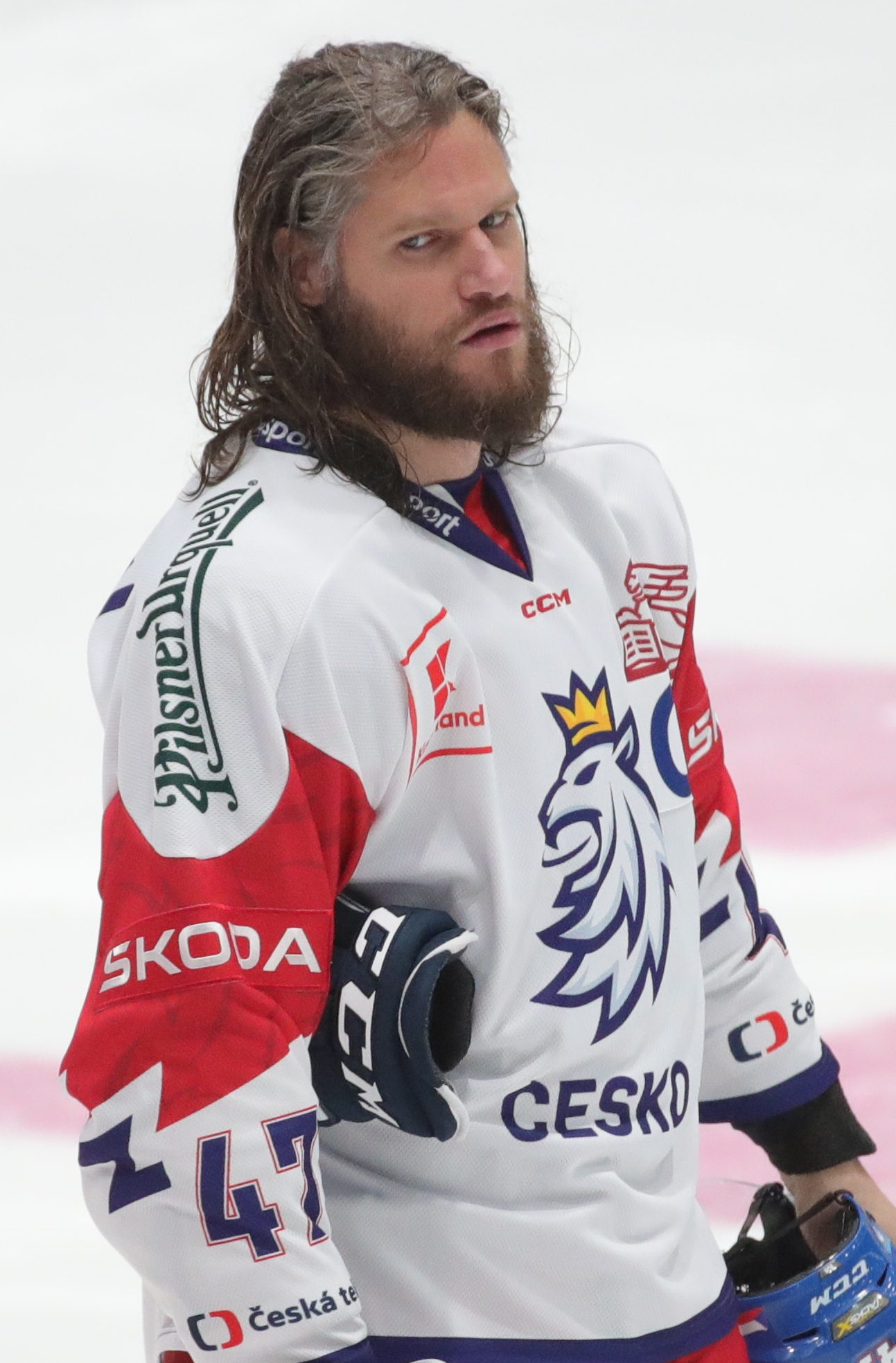
- Jordán with the Czech Republic in 2023
- Born: 17 July 1990 (age 35) Zlín, Czechoslovakia
- Height: 6 ft 1 in (185 cm)
- Weight: 198 lb (90 kg; 14 st 2 lb)
- Position: Defence
- Shoots: Left
- Liiga team Former teams: Lahti Pelicans; Carolina Hurricanes; Ak Bars Kazan; Amur Khabarovsk; SC Rapperswil-Jona Lakers
- National team: Czech Republic
- NHL draft: 105th overall, 2008; Carolina Hurricanes
- Playing career: 2010–present

Michal Jordán (born 17 July 1990) is a Czech professional ice hockey defenceman currently playing for Lahti Pelicans of the Liiga. He previously played for the Carolina Hurricanes of the National Hockey League (NHL). He was selected by the Hurricanes in the fourth round, 105th overall, of the 2008 NHL entry draft.

== Playing career ==
=== Amateur ===
Prior to turning professional, Jordán played major junior ice hockey in the Ontario Hockey League (OHL) with the Windsor Spitfires and the Plymouth Whalers. At the end of his first season of major junior hockey, 2007–08, he was selected by the Carolina Hurricanes in the fourth round, 105th overall, at the 2008 NHL entry draft.

=== Professional ===
Jordán made his professional debut in the 2010–11 season with the Hurricanes' American Hockey League (AHL) affiliate, the Charlotte Checkers. On 9 October 2014, just prior to the commencement of the 2014–15 season, his fifth with the Checkers, Jordán was named team captain.

After six years within the Hurricanes organization, Jordán left as a free agent following the 2015–16 season. On October 7, 2016, he belatedly signed a one-year deal for the duration of the 2016–17 season with Ak Bars Kazan of the KHL. He was limited to 27 games with Kazan, contributing with 7 points.

As a free agent, Jordán opted to continue in the KHL, securing a two-year contract with Amur Khabarovsk on May 26, 2017.

During the 2019–20 season, in November 2019, amidst the controversy of Bill Peters racially-charged comments toward a former player of color, Jordán came to the forefront of NHL media as he described playing for Peters as an "...experience with the worst coach ever by far." He went on to describe how Peters would kick and punch him and others players in the head during a game.

Returning for his sixth season with Amur Khabarovsk in the 2022–23 season, Jordán as team captain, contributed with 2 goals and 11 points through 22 games. On 5 December 2022, Jordán opted to leave Amur and the KHL, agreeing to a contract for the remainder of the season with Swiss club, SC Rapperswil-Jona Lakers of the NL.

== Career statistics ==
=== Regular season and playoffs ===
			Regular season					Playoffs
Season	Team	League	GP	G	A	Pts	PIM	GP	G	A	Pts	PIM
2005–06	HC Hamé Zlín	CZE U18	43	7	15	22	12	5	0	1	1	2
2006–07	HC Hamé Zlín	CZE U18	1	0	0	0	4	—	—	—	—	—
2006–07	HC Hamé Zlín	CZE U20	40	7	11	18	20	12	1	5	6	12
2007–08	Windsor Spitfires	OHL	22	1	5	6	12	—	—	—	—	—
2007–08	Plymouth Whalers	OHL	39	5	17	22	32	4	0	3	3	6
2008–09	Plymouth Whalers	OHL	58	12	30	42	39	11	0	3	3	12
2009–10	Plymouth Whalers	OHL	41	13	19	32	18	9	0	5	5	8
2010–11	Charlotte Checkers	AHL	67	4	14	18	35	16	0	2	2	0
2011–12	Charlotte Checkers	AHL	76	4	18	22	43	—	—	—	—	—
2012–13	Charlotte Checkers	AHL	54	6	10	16	22	1	0	1	1	0
2012–13	Carolina Hurricanes	NHL	5	0	0	0	2	—	—	—	—	—
2013–14	Charlotte Checkers	AHL	70	4	21	25	20	—	—	—	—	—
2014–15	Charlotte Checkers	AHL	30	2	9	11	4	—	—	—	—	—
2014–15	Carolina Hurricanes	NHL	38	2	4	6	4	—	—	—	—	—
2015–16	Carolina Hurricanes	NHL	36	1	0	1	12	—	—	—	—	—
2015–16	Charlotte Checkers	AHL	4	3	0	3	0	—	—	—	—	—
2016–17	Ak Bars Kazan	KHL	27	2	5	7	4	9	1	1	2	0
2017–18	Amur Khabarovsk	KHL	48	2	6	8	8	5	0	1	1	4
2018–19	Amur Khabarovsk	KHL	54	2	13	15	16	—	—	—	—	—
2019–20	Amur Khabarovsk	KHL	61	7	11	18	20	—	—	—	—	—
2020–21	Amur Khabarovsk	KHL	40	9	11	20	12	—	—	—	—	—
2021–22	Amur Khabarovsk	KHL	37	3	7	10	10	—	—	—	—	—
2022–23	Amur Khabarovsk	KHL	22	2	9	11	8	—	—	—	—	—
2022–23	SC Rapperswil-Jona Lakers	NL	19	0	4	4	8	6	0	1	1	2
2023–24	Lahti Pelicans	Liiga	56	9	14	23	56	17	1	2	3	0
2024–25	Lahti Pelicans	Liiga	51	5	12	17	12	—	—	—	—	—
NHL totals			79	3	4	7	18	—	—	—	—	—
KHL totals			289	27	62	89	78	14	1	2	3	4

Medal record

Ice hockey

Representing Czech Republic

World Championships
Bronze medal – third place	2022 Finland	

=== International ===
Year	Team	Event	Result	GP	G	A	Pts	PIM
2007	Czech Republic	WJC18	9th	6	0	1	1	4
2008	Czech Republic	WJC	5th	6	0	1	1	4
2008	Czech Republic	WJC18 D1	11th	5	0	5	5	6
2009	Czech Republic	WJC	6th	6	0	1	1	0
2010	Czech Republic	WJC	7th	6	0	1	1	4
2014	Czech Republic	WC	4th	9	0	1	1	2
2015	Czech Republic	WC	4th	10	1	1	2	2
2016	Czech Republic	WC	5th	8	1	0	1	10
2016	Czech Republic	WCH	6th	3	0	1	1	2
2018	Czech Republic	OG	4th	5	1	0	1	2
2018	Czech Republic	WC	7th	7	0	0	0	0
2022	Czech Republic	WC	3rd place, bronze medalist(s)	8	0	0	0	8
2023	Czech Republic	WC	8th	8	0	0	0	0
Junior totals				29	0	9	9	18
Senior totals				58	3	3	6	26

== Awards and honours ==
Award	Year
IIHF World U18 Championship Best Defenceman	2008
