= Tom Skinner (minister) =

American evangelist and author (1942–1994)

- Born: June 6, 1942; Harlem, New York City, U.S.
- Died: June 17, 1994 (aged 52); Norfolk, Virginia, U.S.
- Education: Wagner College (B.A.); Manhattan Theological Seminary (M.A. Theology)
- Occupation: Evangelist · Leadership trainer · Author · Chaplain
- Years active: c. 1962–1994
- Organizations: Tom Skinner Associates; Tom Skinner Learning Center (Newark); Skinner Farm Leadership Institute (Maryland); NFL Washington Redskins (chaplain)
- Known for: Preacher at Urbana ’70 on racial justice; chaplain of Washington Redskins; founder of Tom Skinner Associates
- Notable work: Black and Free (1968); Words of Revolution (1970); How Black Is the Gospel? (1970); If Christ Is the Answer, What Are the Questions? (1974)
- Spouse(s): Vivian Sutton (first marriage); Barbara Williams‑Skinner (second)
- Children: Two

Tom Skinner (June 6, 1942 – June 17, 1994) was an American evangelist, author, and motivational speaker. He served as chaplain for the Washington Redskins and founded Tom Skinner Associates, which operated leadership training programs in Newark, New Jersey and Tracys Landing, Maryland.

== Early life and education ==
Skinner was born and raised in New York City. He grew up in a religious household, as the son of a minister, but he became involved in street gangs during his youth. Skinner later left gang activity and became involved in Christian ministry. He attended public schools in Manhattan and later pursued higher education at Wagner College on Staten Island, where he earned a bachelor's degree. He continued his theological education at Manhattan Theological Seminary, earning a master's degree in theology.

== Career ==
Skinner worked as an evangelist and motivational speaker and frequently addressed young audiences. He was the president of Tom Skinner Associates, a ministry that operated leadership training and community programs. His organization operated the Tom Skinner Learning Center in Newark, New Jersey, which emphasized leadership development for both youth and adults, and the Skinner Farm Leadership Institute in Tracys Landing, Maryland, which provided similar programs in a rural setting.

Skinner frequently criticized racism and social inequality in speeches to evangelical audiences. Contemporary reports noted that some of these addresses were controversial among white evangelicals. At the 1970 Urbana conference, Skinner delivered a keynote address on racism and Christian social responsibility that is often cited as a prime example of his radical calls for social action.

In addition to his work through Tom Skinner Associates, Skinner was the chaplain for the Washington Redskins football team during the 1970s and 1980s.

Skinner was also an author, and his writings included the book If Christ is the Answer, What are the Questions?, which addressed Christian faith and leadership.

== Personal life and death ==
Skinner was married twice. His first marriage to Vivian Sutton ended in divorce. He later married Barbara Williams, with whom he lived in Tracys Landing, Maryland, after moving there from midtown Manhattan in 1992. Skinner had two daughters, Lauren Skinner and Kyla Rouse, as well as three brothers and a sister.

Tom Skinner died on June 17, 1994, at the age of 52, due to complications related to leukemia. He died at Norfolk General Hospital in Norfolk, Virginia. In attendance at his funeral were African-American leaders including Maya Angelou, Louis Farrakhan, Dick Gregory, Les Brown, and Betty Shabazz, along with members of Congress and professional football players.

== Legacy ==
Skinner's archives, including an oral history from 1990, are held at the Wheaton College Library. Obituaries and later accounts identified Skinner as an influence on Black evangelical leaders, including Kay Coles James, William Pannell, Carl Ellis, John M. Perkins, Tony Evans, and Dolphus Weary.

== Publications ==
- Black and Free, Zondervan Publishing House (1968), ISBN 9780310328124.
- How Black is the Gospel?, Holman Publishing (1970), ISBN 0879810610.
- Words of Revolution: A Call to Involvement in the Real Revolution, Zondervan Publishing House (1970).
- If Christ is the Answer, What are the Questions?, Zondervan Publishing House (1974), ISBN 0310328217.
