= Bethany College (Saskatchewan) =

Christian Bible college in Canada

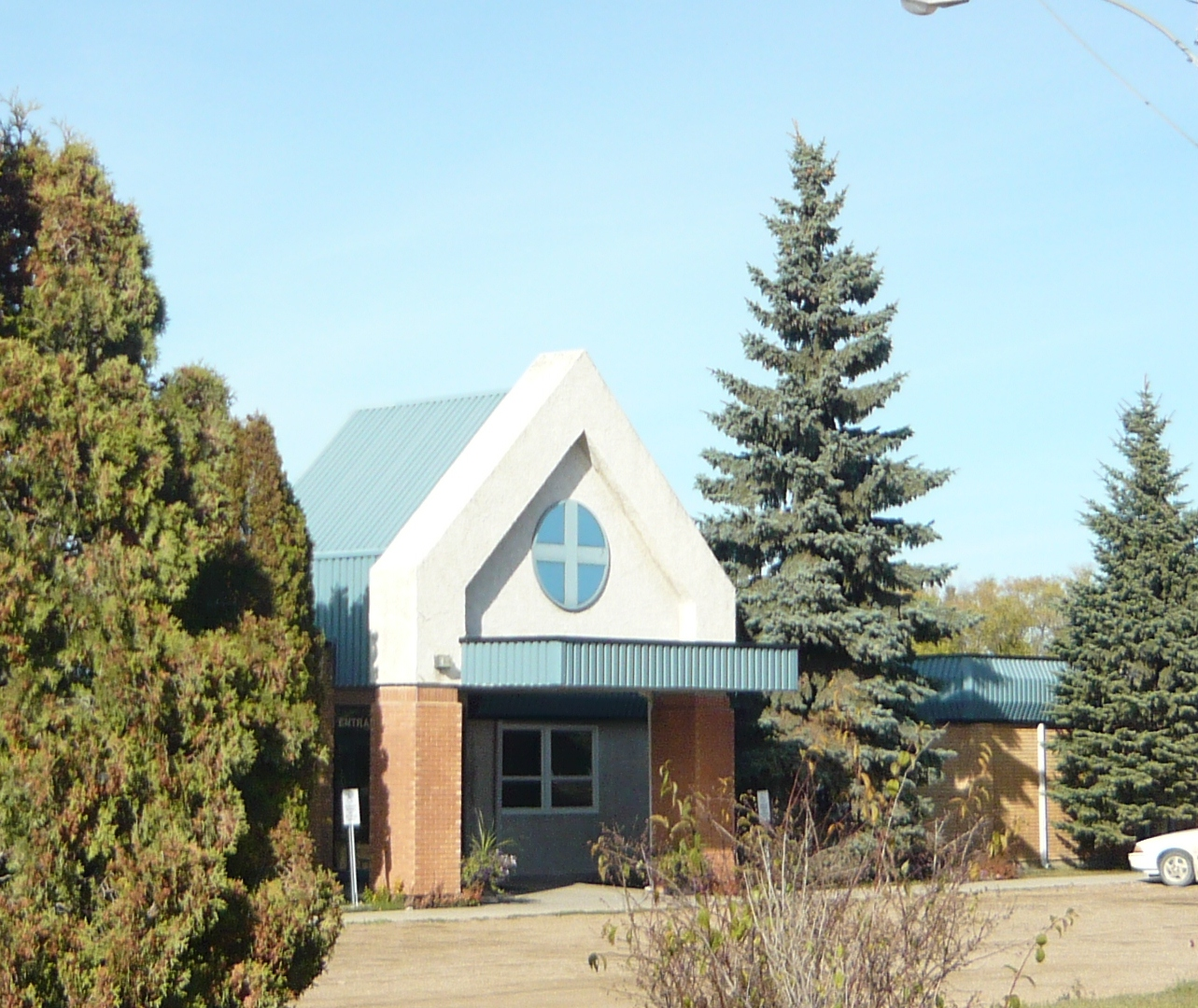
- Motto: Live. Move. Be
- Type: College
- Active: 1927–2015
- Academic affiliations: CHEC
- Endowment: 0
- President: Darryl Balzer (Sept. 2017-present)
- Faculty: 0
- Administrative staff: 7
- Students: 9
- Location: 703 2nd Street E, Hepburn, Saskatchewan, Canada; 52°31′40″N 106°43′43″W
- Campus: 13 acres (5.3 ha)
- Colours: Red
- Website: bethany.sk.ca

Bethany College (formerly Bethany Bible Institute) was a Christian Bible college in the town of Hepburn, Saskatchewan, Canada, until 2015.

== History ==
It was established in 1927 by the Mennonite Brethren Churches of Alberta and Saskatchewan, and the Saskatchewan Evangelical Mennonite Mission Conference churches. The mission of Bethany College was to nurture disciples and train leaders to serve. It was named after the village of Bethany near Jerusalem, a location of several significant encounters with Jesus, as mentioned in the New Testament. It was announced by the board of directors on December 9, 2014, that Bethany's last year of operation "in its current iteration" would be academic year 2014–15. The school reopened in 2017 as the Thrive Discipleship program. This is a one-year program with the theme of discipleship key to the program

== Programs ==
Bethany College offered four programs of study:

- The TESOL (Teaching English to Speakers of Other Languages) Certificate (15 credits)
- Diploma of Biblical Studies (2 years)
- Bachelor of Christian Studies Degree (3 years)
- Bachelor of Arts Degree (4 years)

== Facilities ==
The Bethany College facilities included the Administration Building, which houses classrooms, the Learning Resource Centre (library), chapel, offices, faculty/staff offices, dining hall, and student lounge and mall area; Bethany Place, which houses the Gymnasium/Auditorium, and classrooms; and the Ministry Arts wing, housing music studios, and more teaching spaces. Residential facilities for men are named West and East Court, joined by a lounge; and for women are named North and Centre Court. There is a recreation area, Soccer Field and Courtyard.
