= Three Hills =

Town in Alberta, Canada

- Town
- Town of Three Hills
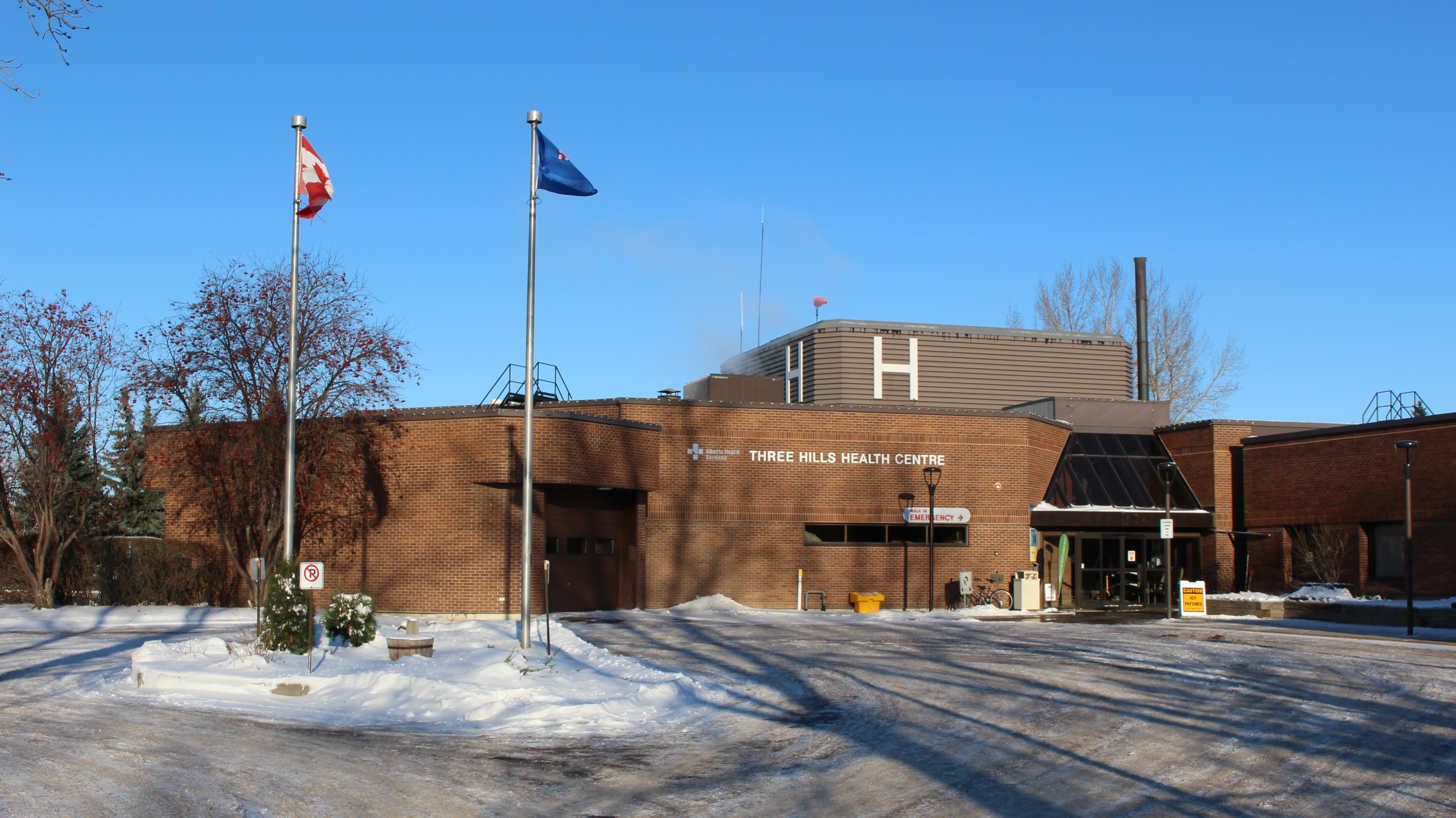
- Three Hills Health Centre

- Location of Three Hills in Alberta
- Coordinates: 51°42′26″N 113°15′53″W
- Country: Canada
- Province: Alberta
- Region: Central Alberta
- Census division: 5
- Municipal district: Kneehill County
- Incorporated
  - Village: 14 June 1912
  - Town: 1 January 1929

Government
  - Mayor: Raymond Wildeman
  - Governing body: Three Hills Town Council

Area (2021)
  - Land: 6.74 km^{2} (2.60 sq mi)
- Elevation: 896 m (2,940 ft)

Population (2021)
  - Total: 3,171
- Time zone: UTC−06:00 (Alberta Time)
- Postal Codes: T0M 2A0 & T0M 2N0
- Highways: Highway 21; Highway 583
- Waterway: Threehills Creek
- Website: Official website

Three Hills is a town in southern Alberta, Canada. Surrounded by Kneehill County, it takes its name from the three somewhat-larger-than-normal hills to its north.

== History ==
Three Hills post office dates from 1904. Three Hills was incorporated as a village in 1912, the year it was moved to its current location on the Grand Trunk Pacific Railway line running between Tofield and Calgary. With ranchers and farmers constituting its first residents, it soon became a centre for the surrounding wheat-growing area.

In 1922, Prairie Bible Institute (now named Prairie College) was established in Three Hills with L. E. Maxwell as its first principal. This occurrence helped to increase the population of the town proper and its adjacent settlements. By the mid 1980s, the 0.53 km^{2} (130-acre) college campus and the nearby hamlets of Grantville and Ruarkville were annexed to the town.

Although a relatively small community, Three Hills hosted the Alberta Seniors Games in the summer of 1998. The town was chosen to host this event because of its ability to utilize large and well-equipped facilities at Prairie College. This included the opening and closing ceremonies, which took place in Prairie's 4,200-seat Maxwell Memorial Tabernacle.

Canada's largest religious auditorium, the Maxwell Tabernacle operated from 1953 until it was decommissioned and demolished in 2005. It was the college chapel and hosted Christian concerts and Bible conferences and was the worship centre for a local church, the Prairie Tabernacle Congregation. This facility was also used as the convocation auditorium for Prairie College, Prairie Christian Academy and the Three Hills High School. With the construction of a new 1,600-square-metre (17,000 ft^{2}) facility, opened in 2020, the Prairie Tabernacle now stands adjacent to Prairie Christian Academy about five blocks east of the college campus.

Because of the development of nearby methane fields, the food and lodging industries in Three Hills have grown considerably over the past few years.

== Demographics ==
In the 2021 Census of Population conducted by Statistics Canada, the Town of Three Hills had a population of 3,171 living in 1,220 of its 1,290 total private dwellings, a change of −1.3% from its 2016 population of 3,212. With a land area of 6.74 km^{2} (2.60 sq mi), it had a population density of 470.5/km^{2} (1,218.5/sq mi) in 2021.

In the 2016 Census of Population conducted by Statistics Canada, the Town of Three Hills recorded a population of 3,212 living in 1,232 of its 1,306 total private dwellings, a 0.4% change from its 2011 population of 3,198. With a land area of 6.75 km^{2} (2.61 sq mi), it had a population density of 475.9/km^{2} (1,232.5/sq mi) in 2016.

The Town of Three Hills' 2012 municipal census counted a population of 3,230, a 2.8% decrease from its 2008 municipal census population of 3,322.

== Attractions ==
Three Hills offers much to its community, including the Three Hills Municipal Library, Aquatic Centre, Centennial Place hockey arena, curling rink, campground, Three Hills Golf Club, and the Kneehill Historical Museum.

Since 1981, Three Hills has hosted an annual weekend in early June for auto enthusiasts called Cruise Night. The event typically attracts more than 8,000 visitors, along with their classic cars, trucks, motorcycles, and hot rods. This weekend is the largest of its kind in all of Western Canada.

== Media ==
- The Capital – weekly newspaper

== Notable people ==
- Phil Callaway, humorist, speaker, and award-winning author of 25 books
- Erica Durance, actress known for her roles as Lois Lane (in Smallville) and Dr. Alex Reid (in Saving Hope)
- Paul Janz, musician and theologian
- Bill Peters, NHL coach

== See also ==
- Three Hills Airport
- List of communities in Alberta
- List of towns in Alberta
