= Prairie College =

Christian post-secondary school in Canada

- Motto: To know Christ and make Him known
- Type: Private
- Established: 1922
- Religious affiliation: Christian
- Academic affiliations: CCCU, ABHE
- Endowment: CDN $2.79 million
- President: Mark Maxwell
- Students: 535 (resident, hy-flex, on-line & prison)
- Location: Three Hills, Alberta, Canada; 51.7082°N 113.2663°W
- Campus: Rural, (130 acres (53 ha))
- Colours: Light blue, yellow, & orange
- Nickname: Pilots
- Sporting affiliations: ACAC, PAC
- Website: www.prairie.edu

Prairie College is an interdenominational Christian College located in the town of Three Hills, Alberta, Canada. Founded as Prairie Bible Institute, classes began on October 9, 1922, on the property of the McElheran family farm.

== History ==
A local Bible Study group led by J. Fergus Kirk, a central Alberta Presbyterian farmer, was the precursor to Prairie College. Kirk asked W.C. Stephens, the principal of the Midland Bible Institute of Kansas City, a short-lived school of the Christian and Missionary Alliance, to send a teacher north west to the Canadian prairies. As a result, L. E. Maxwell arrived in Three Hills in the fall of 1922 and immediately proceeded to teach and eventually develop a structured curriculum. Maxwell became the school's principal and later its president. After 58 years, Maxwell retired in the spring of 1980 near the age of 85. The current president of Prairie College is Mark Maxwell, L. E. Maxwell's grandson.

Maxwell, the Kirks, the McElherans, and other local families saw the school grow to attain an enrolment of over 900 students by 1948 and become Canada's largest Bible college, a position it would hold until 1984. Although initially wary of outside alliances and influences, Prairie Bible Institute was officially incorporated and eventually accredited to grant degrees in divinity through provincial legislative acts and amendments of The Crown in Right of Alberta, and has conferred associate's degrees and Bachelor degrees to its graduates since 1980. From 1988 to 2004, PBI operated a graduate school and offered Master's degrees at a satellite campus in Calgary. During that same period, PBI reached undergraduate credit and programmatic block transfer arrangements with The King's University College in Edmonton and the University of Lethbridge in southern Alberta, and became accredited in 1997 when the Association for Biblical Higher Education accepted PBI as a full member.

Graduate level education returned to Prairie in the fall of 2012 through reciprocal academic arrangements with Carey Theological College, an accredited seminary affiliated with the University of British Columbia of Vancouver. In that agreement, fourth year students in PBI's baccalaureate programs were eligible to receive one year's advanced standing toward a master's degree at Carey. Alternatively, a student could enrol directly in Carey's seminary courses after completing three academic years at Prairie, and have those graduate credits fulfill both fourth year bachelor's degree requirements at Prairie College, as well as first-year course requirements in one of Carey's graduate programs.

Additionally in 2019, Prairie College entered into a full partnership with Taylor Seminary of Edmonton, Alberta to deliver accelerated hybrid B.A.M., M.Div. concurrent degrees that Prairie College students are able to achieve within five academic years through an integrated program of studies. This agreement lapsed when Taylor pursued status as a legacy campus of Kairos University. However, Carey Theological College and Prairie College enhanced their partnership with a hybrid/online accelerated five-year B.A.M., M.Div. - available to students around the world.

In 2020, Prairie College introduced a new master's degree program in Global Leadership in Christian Education.

In 2026, the Legislative Assembly of Alberta passed the Prairie Bible Institute Amendment Act, 2026 (Bill Pr2). The bill received royal assent on May 14, 2026. The amendment updates the institute’s original 1946 incorporating statute to authorize Prairie Bible Institute (operating as Prairie College) to grant baccalaureate, master’s, and doctoral degrees in programs approved under Alberta’s Post-secondary Learning Act, in addition to divinity degrees, and to award institutionally approved diplomas and certificates.

Ventures initiated by Prairie were the Prairie Sunday School Mission, established in 1929, which was subsequently reorganized as the Alberta branch of the Canadian Sunday School Mission - later renamed as One Hope Canada. In 1933, at the invitation of Peace River area residents, Prairie College graduate Walter W. McNaughton traveled from Viking, Alberta, to Peace River country to establish the Peace River Bible Institute, now located at Sexsmith, near the city of Grande Prairie. By the 1940s, Prairie had founded three general education Christian schools on its Three Hills campus: Prairie Elementary, Prairie Junior High, and Prairie High School. In 2004 these schools were amalgamated as Prairie Christian Academy (PCA) and began to operate independently from the Bible Institute. PCA now exists as one of Alberta's alternative schools under the local public school division.

Another outgrowth of the school was its own campus church, The Prairie Tabernacle Congregation. This fellowship met for more than fifty years in a cavernous auditorium seating 4,300. Remodeled and renamed in 1985, the Maxwell Memorial Tabernacle was Canada's largest religious auditorium. In 2005, the building was demolished so that a new multipurpose facility, The Maxwell Centre, could be built to house administrative offices and classrooms for Prairie College. As for Prairie Tabernacle Congregation, the fellowship initially moved its meeting place to the local Christian Academy and subsequently migrated to other facilities on the college campus. In January 2020, a new Prairie Tabernacle was officially opened for the congregation. This modern facility contains 17,000 square feet and is located on Highway 583 adjacent to the Prairie Christian Academy. It stands about 5 blocks east of the Prairie College campus.

Prairie was one of the first Bible training institutes in Western Canada. Alumni were influential in the promotion of evangelical churches, especially congregations of the Christian and Missionary Alliance and the Evangelical Free Church. These, along with other evangelical churches, employed graduates of Prairie and other rural Bible schools until they were able to establish their own denominational colleges and seminaries with campuses in urban and metropolitan areas of western Canada. Since its academic arrangements with Taylor Seminary were finalized in 2019 Prairie College has been endorsed as a partner school of the Alberta Baptist Association, a regional district of the North American Baptist Conference.

Prairie College now represents one of the most denominationally diversified theological faculties in the Council for Christian Colleges and Universities CCCU, with an Anglican priest, a graduate from Westminster Theological Seminary, a Wesleyan, an Anabaptist former pastor, and several nondenominational professors.

== Programs ==
Today, on its Three Hills campus in Alberta, Prairie Bible Institute operates Prairie College, a post-secondary undergraduate ministry and vocational centre of higher education; further Prairie College maintains active academic arrangements with Bow Valley College of Calgary and Carey Theological College of Vancouver:

- Prairie College offers resident, commuter and distance education ministry programs with major concentrations in Biblical Studies, Theology, Church Ministries or Intercultural Studies culminating in an A.A.R.S., B.Min., B.Th., B.A., and a concurrent B.A.-M.Div. degree program with Carey Theological College of Vancouver, British Columbia, so that all students in Prairie's four-year bachelor's degree programs have one year's access to and/or advanced standing in an accredited M.A. or M.Div. seminary degree program from Carey Theological College.
- As well, in each of the four-year bachelor's degree programs of Prairie College the students study the whole Biblical canon in seven courses (three New Testament segments and four Old Testament segments).
- Applied vocational programs of Prairie College include Aviation (based at Three Hills Airport) culminating in an Associate of Arts in Mission Aviation degree. Other Applied Arts and Technology programs are offered by Prairie College which lead to vocational diplomas or Associate of Arts degrees with incorporated provincially recognized diplomas in Digital Media, Emergency Medical Technology, Practical Nursing, Sports Management and other applied disciplines under consideration or development from partnering colleges, most notably Red Deer Polytechnic Institute and Olds College. Prairie College also confers a four-year Bachelor of Marketplace Ministry which is an interdisciplinary ministry and vocational program of studies and a Bachelor of Divinity in Business.

The school teaches creation as represented in the Book of Genesis, including the view of Adam and Eve as historical figures. In order to foster Christian development, most single first- and second-year students, as well as students in full-time flight training live in residence.

== Athletics ==
The Prairie College Pilots are a member of both the Alberta Colleges Athletic Conference and Prairie Athletic Conference. The school currently competes in men's and women's basketball, futsal, and volleyball, as well as cross country running and indoor track.

Prairie is a former member of the Alberta Colleges Athletic League.

== Notable alumni ==
- John Dekker: Missionary and author
- Don Richardson: Missionary and author
- Ralph D. Winter: Missiologist, Author, Founder U.S. Center for World Missions, Founder William Carey University
- Elisabeth Elliot: Author, Teacher and widow of martyred missionary Jim Elliot
- Peter Craigie: Old Testament Scholar, Author, Dean of Humanities Faculty and V.P. University of Calgary
- Paul Chamberlain: Philosopher and professor
