= Peace River Bible Institute =

College in Alberta, Canada

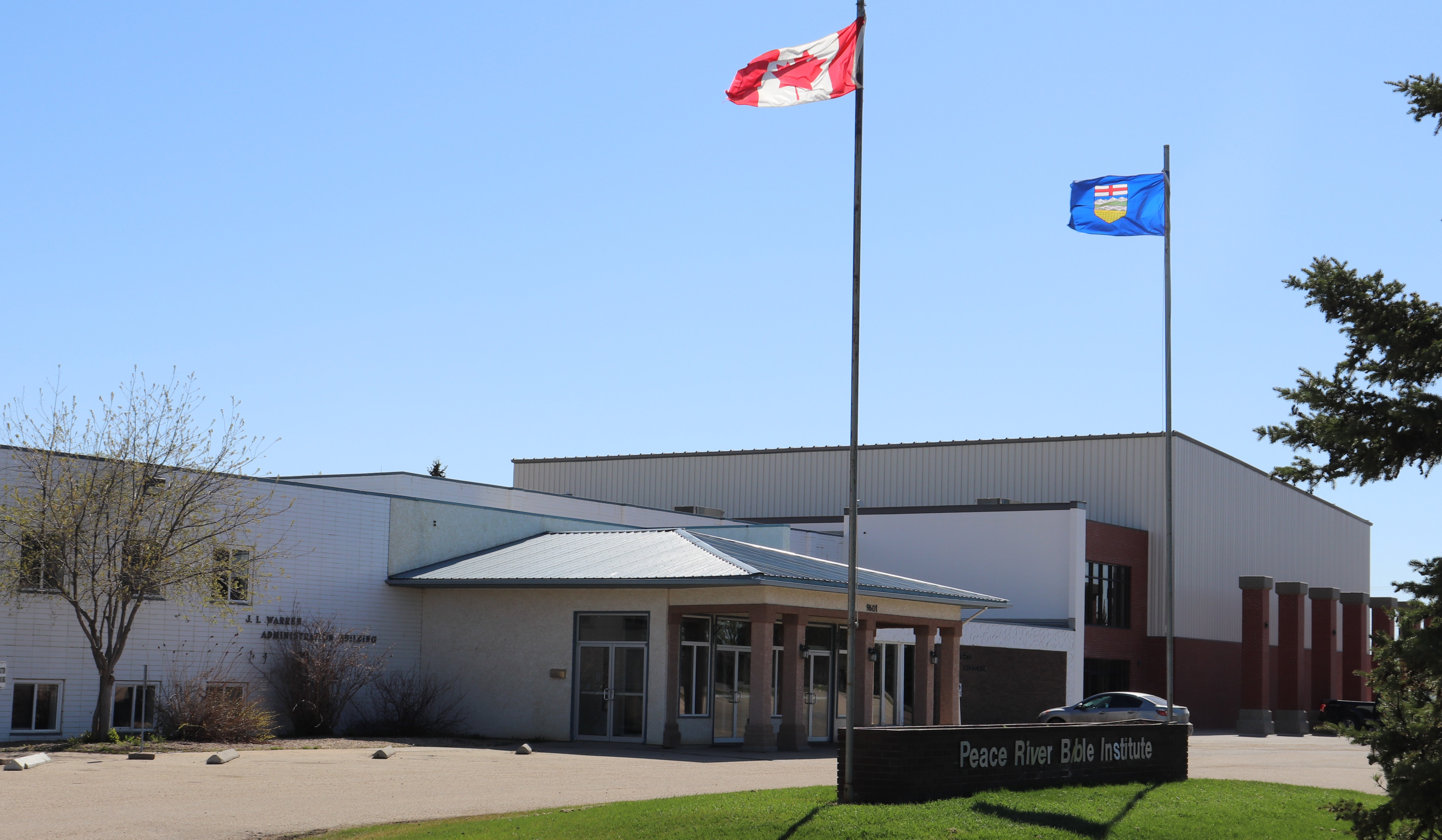
- Motto: A College for Life
- Type: private bible college
- Established: 1933
- Religious affiliation: Christian
- Academic affiliations: CHEC
- President: Kim Cairns
- Students: 45 (2021-2022)
- Location: Sexsmith, Alberta, Canada; 55.3464°N 118.7799°W
- Colours: Black & red
- Website: www.prbi.edu

The Peace River Bible Institute is a degree-granting college recognized by the province of Alberta. PRBI's Bachelor of Religious Education course was recognized after its establishment in the 1980s by the American Association of Bible Colleges. The Bible college is located in Sexsmith, Alberta, Canada.

== History ==
The Peace River Bible Institute (PRBI) was founded in 1933 in Berwyn by Walter McNaughton, a graduate of the Prairie Bible Institute, who moved PRBI to its present location in Sexsmith two years later. PRBI's first director was Hattie Kirk, whose work was celebrated in an exhibition at the Grande Prairie Museum devoted to women's role in the history of the Peace region. The college's student numbers have risen rapidly since 1993, with the number of enrolments rising from 60 to 200 over the 10 years leading up to 2007.

== Programs ==
Courses offered by PRBI range between one and four years in length, and cover religious education, church music, pastoral studies and mission work. The college's four-year Bachelor of Religious Education course in "Church Ministry and Community Service" can include fire fighting certification, with training provided through a partnership with the Sexsmith fire department. Some of the students who take these courses become pastors, but others seek employment in other professions.

== Discipleship ==
PRBI is a self described discipleship-focused school. Its website states that "we are in the process of creating a transferable model of disciple-making to be observed and practiced within the student body." As part of their discipleship model PRBI encourages one-on-one discipleship relationships as well as facilitating mandatory discipleship groups called "Community Life Groups" which are led by various Community Life Leaders. Community Life Leaders are selected from upperclassmen who apply and are affirmed by the Campus Life Department for the following school year. Resident Leaders are also considered part of the discipleship model, as they oversee the spiritual and material needs of the various dormitories.

== Recognition ==
A 2004 water balloon fight at PBRI involving 800 participants and 8,000 balloons was recognised by The Guinness Book of World Records as the largest yet conducted. The record was exceeded at Sint-Michielscollege Brasschaat in Belgium in April 2005.

== Staff and faculty ==
The current President of PRBI is Kim Cairns, who was promoted from academic dean to become the college's president in 2019. His forerunner was Waldie Neufeld. Kim Carins is also the Intercultural Ministries Program Advisor.

Academics:

- Brad Cowie – Academic Dean, Registrar & Faculty
- Jason Gayoway – Program Advisor & Faculty Field Education Advisor
- Scott Butler – Faculty & Librarian

Student Life:

- Josh Rigby – Dean of Men
- Anne Laursen – Dean of Women

For an extensive list of Team Members go to prbi.edu/PRBIteam

== Historical list of staff and faculty ==
Year	President	Vice President	Chair of Christian Ministries	Chair of Global Ministries	Chair of Pastoral	Chair of Worship Arts	Student Campus Pastor	Men's Campus Pastor	Women's Campus Pastor	Men's Resident Director	Women's Resident Director
2005–2006	Rod Masterson	?	?	Darrell Gerber	Warren Charlton	John Bell	Darrel Schmidt	Dean Yurkewich	Debbie Higgs	Ryan Campbell	Brandi Hall
2006–2007	Waldie Neufeld (Interim)	?	?	Darrell Gerber	Warren Charlton	John Bell	Darrel Schmidt	Dean Yurkewich	Judy Sandiford	Ryan Campbell	Brandi Hall
2007–2008	Waldie Neufeld	Darrell Gerber	Darrell Gerber	Darrell Gerber	Warren Charlton	John Bell	Darrel Schmidt	Mark Weiderick	Judy Sandiford	Samuel Minatara & Simon Ghali	Brandi Hall
2008–2009	Waldie Neufeld	Darrell Gerber	?	Darrell Gerber	Warren Charlton	John Bell	Darrel Schmidt	Mark Weiderick	Sharon Gerber	Samuel Minatara	Brandi Hall
2009–2010	Waldie Neufeld	Darrell Gerber	?	Darrell Gerber	Warren Charlton	John Bell	Darrel Schmidt	Mark Weiderick	Sharon Gerber	N/A	Autmn Teele
2010–2011	Waldie Neufeld	Darrell Gerber	Brad Cowie	Darrell Gerber	Warren Charlton	John Bell	Darrel Schmidt	Mark Weiderick	Sharon Gerber	N/A	Autumn Teele
2011–2012	Waldie Neufeld	Kim Cairns	Brad Cowie	Kim Cairns	Warren Charlton	John Bell	Darrel Schmidt	Shane Dell	Sharon Gerber	N/A	Autumn Teele
2012–2013	Waldie Neufeld	Kim Cairns	Brad Cowie	Kim Cairns	Warren Charlton	John Bell	Darrel Schmidt	Shane Dell	Sharon Gerber	N/A	Kendra Ford
2013–2014	Waldie Neufeld	Kim Cairns	Brad Cowie	Kim Cairns	Jason Gayoway	John Bell	Darrel Schmidt	Shane Dell	Shelley Martindale	Justin Worthington	Meadow Teele
2014–2015	Waldie Neufeld	Kim Cairns	Brad Cowie	Kim Cairns	Jason Gayoway	John Bell	Darrel Schmidt	Shane Dell	Shelley Martindale	N/A	Camille Demers
2015–2017	Waldie Neufeld	Kim Cairns	Brad Cowie	Kim Cairns	Jason Gayoway	John Bell	Darrel Schmidt	Shane Dell	Shelley Martindale	N/A	N/A
2017–2018	Waldie Neufeld	Kim Cairns	Brad Cowie	Kim Cairns	Jason Gayoway	Jon Osborne	Darrel Schmidt	Shane Dell	Shelley Martindale	N/A	N/A
2018–2019	Waldie Neufeld	Kim Cairns	Brad Cowie	Kim Cairns	Jason Gayoway	Jon Osborne	Shane Dell	Jesse Raugust	Shelley Martindale	N/A	N/A
2019–2020	Kim Cairns	Jeremy Johnston	Brad Cowie	Kim Cairns	Jason Gayoway	Jon Osborne	Jesse Raugust	Jesse Raugust	Shelley Martindale	N/A	N/A
2020-2021	Kim Cairns	Jeremy Johnston	Brad Cowie	Kim Cairns	Jason Gayoway	N/A	Jesse Raugust	Jesse Raugust	Anne Laursen	N/A	N/A
2021-2022	Kim Cairns	Jeremy Johnston	Brad Cowie	Kim Cairns	Jason Gayoway	N/A	N/A	Josh Rigby	Anne Laursen	N/A	N/A
