= Education in Saskatchewan =

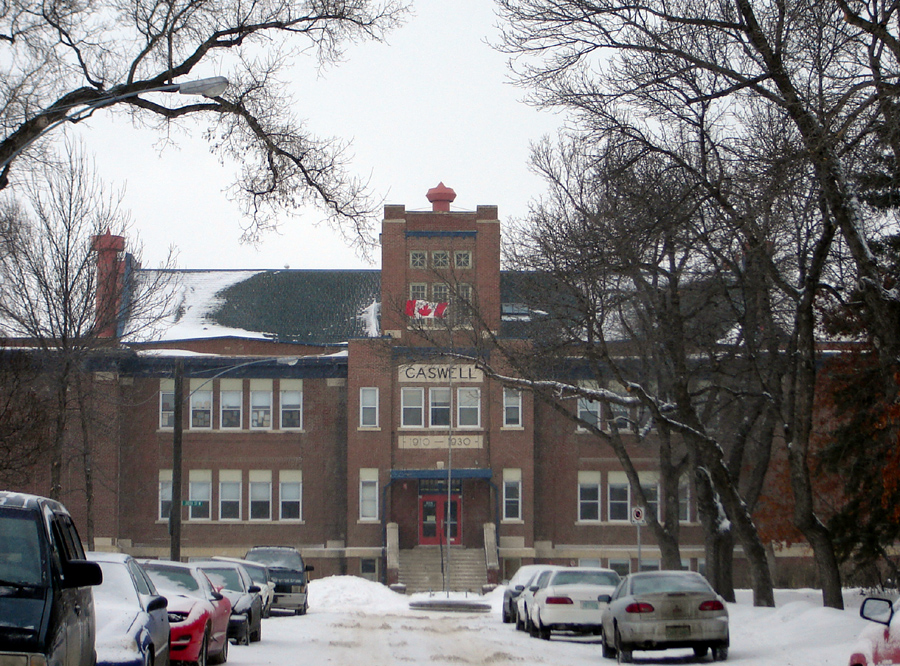
Caswell Public Elementary School

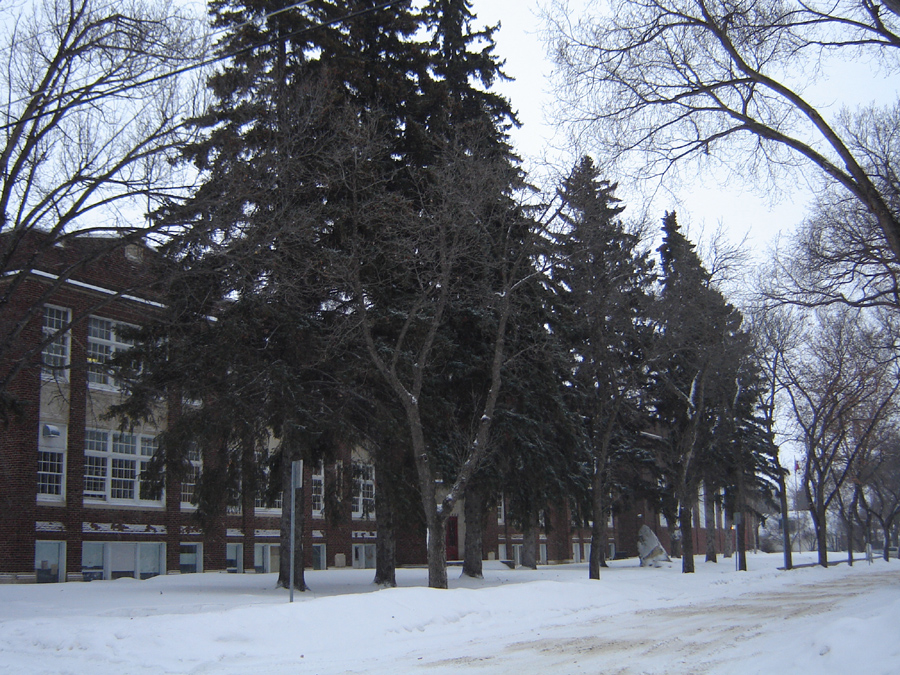
City Park Collegiate Institute

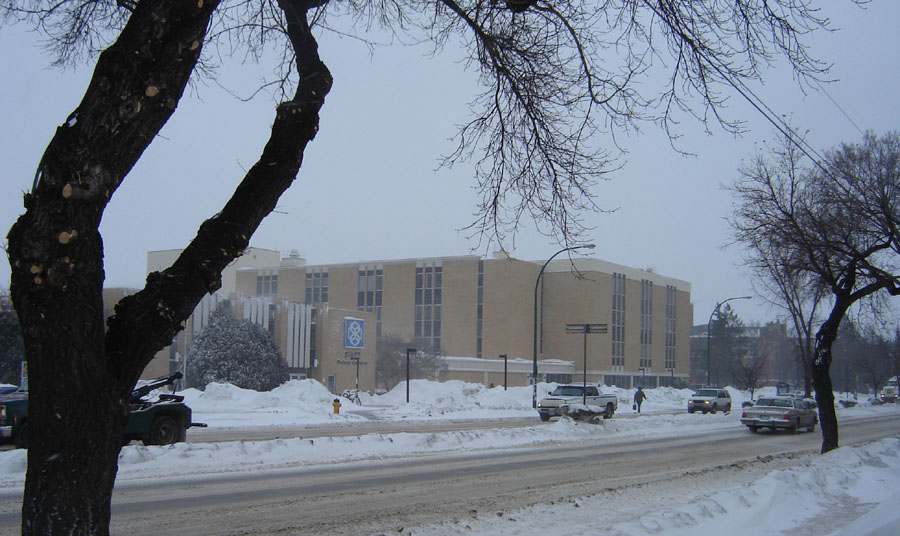
SIAST Kelsey

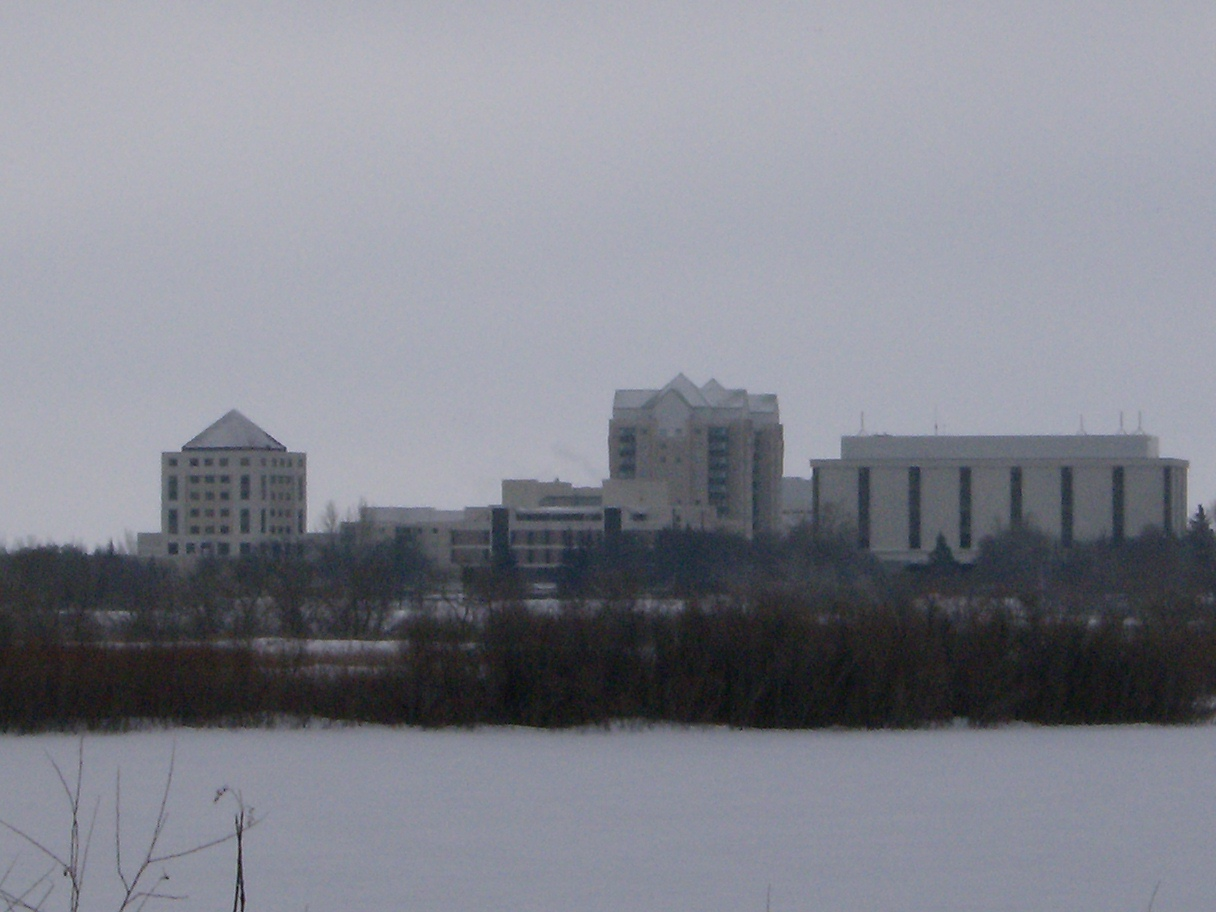
University of Regina

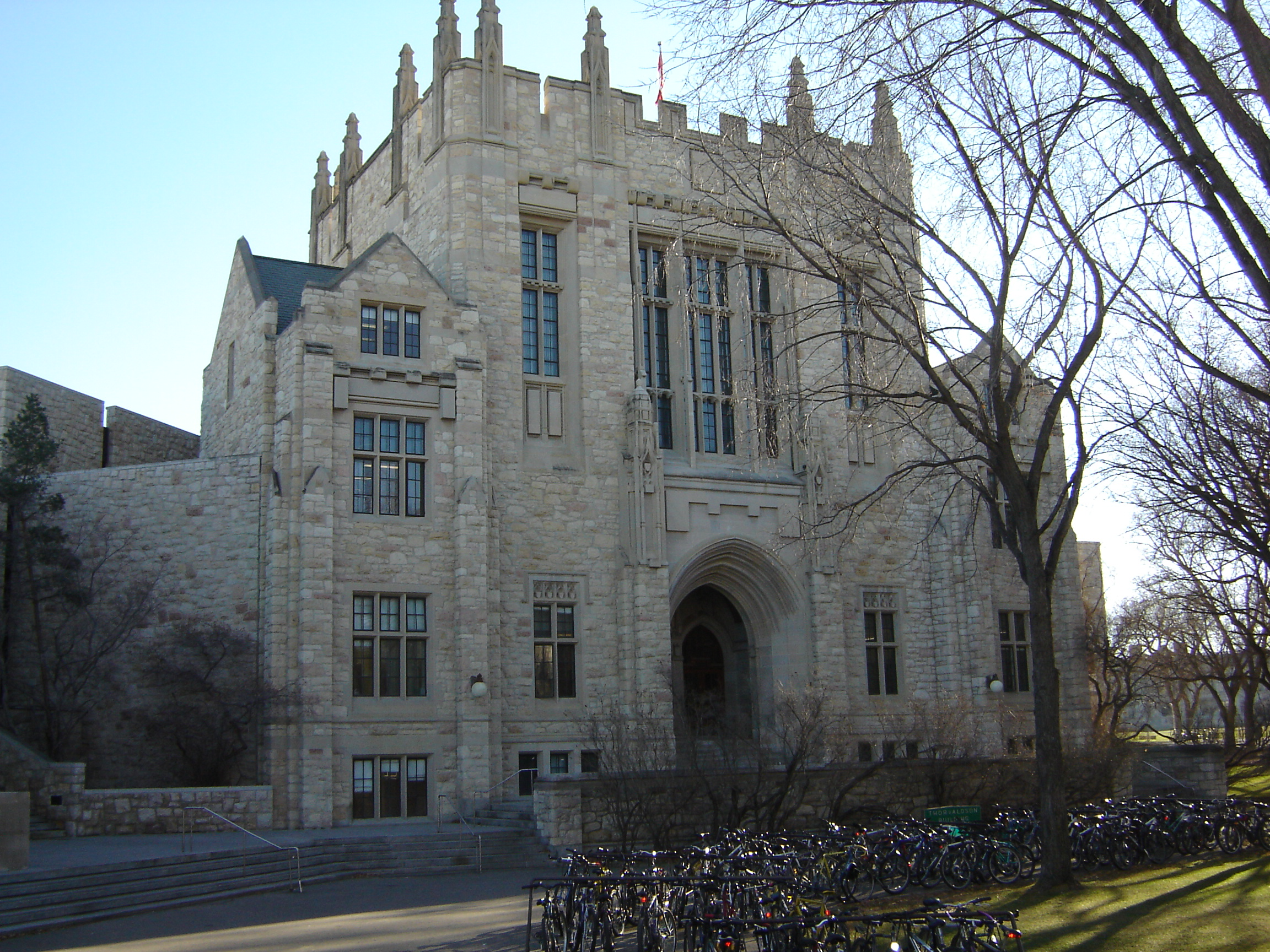
Thorvaldson building University of Saskatchewan

Education in Saskatchewan, Canada, teaches a curriculum of learning set out by the Government of Saskatchewan through the Ministry of Education. The curriculum sets out to develop skills, knowledge and understanding to improve the quality of life. On June 22, 1915, Walter Scott, Premier and Minister of Education, set out as his mandate the "purpose of procuring for the children of Saskatchewan a better education and an education of greater service and utility to meet the conditions of the chief industry in the Province, which is agriculture". Education facilitates the cultural and regional socialization of an individual through the realisation of their self-potential and latent talents. Historically, the region of Saskatchewan needed successful homesteaders so the focus was to develop a unified language for successful economic trading, and agricultural understanding to develop goods, livestock and cash crops to trade. After the mechanized advancements following the Industrial Revolution and World War II, the primary employment agriculture sector of farming was not as labour-intensive. Individuals focused on secondary industries such as manufacturing and construction, as well as tertiary employment like transportation, trade, finance and services. Schools became technologically more advanced and adapted to supply resources for this growing demand and change of focus.

Education in Saskatchewan is generally divided as Elementary (primary school, public school), followed by Secondary (high school) and Post-secondary (university, college). Within the province under the Ministry of Education, there are district school boards administering the educational programs.

== History ==
The history of education in this region, North West Territories, began officially in 1885 with Territorial Ordinance #5. North West Territorial Schools Districts or One Room School Houses replaced trading post schooling, missionary schools and private schooling of the past. Moose Jaw School District #1 was formally established December 5, 1884 under the new Board of Education. The 1944 School Act set out to establish larger consolidated schools and the formation of the schools and school districts presently in use. As with any Canadian province, the Saskatchewan Legislature has almost exclusive authority to make laws respecting education. Since 1905, the Legislature has used this capacity to continue the model of locally elected public and separate school boards which originated before 1905, as well as to create and/or regulate universities, colleges, technical institutions and other educational forms and institutions (public charter schools, private schools, home schooling). For historians and genealogists, previous school district records have been submitted to the Saskatchewan Provincial Archives Regina Branch.

== Pre-school ==
Pre-school in Saskatchewan is relatively unregulated, and is not compulsory. The first exposure many children have to learning with others outside of traditional parenting is day care or a parent run playgroup. This sort of activity is not generally considered "schooling". Pre-school education is separate from primary school. Pre-schools are usually run by local councils, community groups or private organisations. Pre-school is offered to three- to five-year-olds, although voluntary attendance numbers vary widely. The year before a child is due to attend primary school is the main year for pre-school education. This year is far more commonly attended, and usually takes the form of a few hours of activity five days a week.

== Primary and secondary education ==
Schools providing primary education are more often referred to as elementary schools or grade schools. Primary and secondary education under the header of K-12 education (K is for kindergarten, 12 is for grade 12). A system of grades is used to describe the various stages of education. Grades are generally known by cardinal number, e.g., grade 12.

Typically, primary education is provided in schools, where the child will stay in steadily advancing classes until they complete it and move on to secondary schooling. Children are usually placed in classes with one teacher who will be primarily responsible for their education and welfare for that year. This teacher may be assisted to varying degrees by specialist teachers in certain subject areas, often music or physical education. The continuity with a single teacher and the opportunity to build up a close relationship with the class is a notable feature of the primary education system. Pursuant to The Education Act, school attendance is compulsory for children between the ages of 7 and 16 years. In addition, schooling is provided to anyone between the ages of 6 and 21 years. Both primary and secondary education are free.

High school, secondary school, école secondaire, collegiate institute generally begin from grade 9 through 12 and education is compulsory between the ages of 7 and 16 years according to Saskatchewan's Education Act, 1995 Section 149. However, anyone between the ages of 6 and 21 years "has the right",

- (a) "to attend school in the school division where that person or that persons parents or guardians reside"; and
- (b) "to receive instruction appropriate to that persons age and level of educational achievement" ^{Education Act of Saskatchewan.}through either school board system. The schools are divided by religion, publicly funded by a separate school board for Catholic-based education or publicly funded by a public school board or families may choose to pay for their education at eight private high schools.

In most cases the elementary school ends at grade eight, and high school provides grades nine through twelve; however, there are some exceptions where there is a middle school provided.

From 1889 to 1920s the school class organisation was for elementary levels; Standard I, II, III, IV and V; followed by secondary school beginning at Standard VI. Standard X corresponded to a junior or Class 3 provincial certificate, Standard XI would give a Middle, Class 2 provincial certificate, and finally Standard XII would result in a Senior, Class 1 provincial certificate. A level of attainment of at least Class 3 Standard was needed to teach during this time.

== Normal ages ==
Organization of classes
Level	Division	Grade
Primary	Division I	Grades one, two, and three
Intermediate	Division II	Grades four, five, and six
Junior high school	Division III	Grades seven, eight and nine
Senior High School or collegiate institute	Division IV	Grades ten, eleven and twelve

=== Elementary ===
- Pre-School: 4-5 year olds
- Kindergarten: 5-6 year olds
- Grade 1: 6-7 year olds
- Grade 2: 7-8 year olds
- Grade 3: 8-9 year olds
- Grade 4: 9-10 year olds
- Grade 5: 10-11 year olds
- Grade 6: 11-12 year olds
- Grade 7: 12-13 year olds
- Grade 8: 13-14 year olds

=== Secondary ===
- Grade 9: 14-15 year olds
- Grade 10: 15-16 year olds
- Grade 11: 16-17 year olds
- Grade 12: 17- 21 year olds

== Saskatchewan school divisions ==
During the era of one room school houses, school districts numbered over 5,000 with the attendant administrative costs. Following the 1944 School Act and 1945 Larger School Unit Act Saskatchewan began larger school consolidation. The one room school house district began to close down in favour of the larger, technologically advanced consolidated school in the neighboring urban centre.

Now there are 28 school divisions and 3 geographical regions. Each school region has a Regional Director, Regional Superintendent of Curriculum and Instruction, Regional Superintendent of Children's Services and Office Manager. Each school division will have a board chair, Director and Secretary-Treasurer. These are the administrative branches which oversee the provision of the physical school building, staffing and also implement the policies and curricula set out by the Government of Saskatchewan Ministry of Education. Each school division administers a number of regional schools.

There are four main school board division designations.

- Public School Divisions
- Separate School Divisions
- Francophone School Division
- Protestant School Division

=== See also ===
- List of Saskatchewan school divisions
- Elementary and Secondary Schools in Regina, Saskatchewan
- Public, separate and private schools in Regina, Saskatchewan
- Saskatoon Public School Division
- Greater Saskatoon Catholic School Division

== Electives ==
There are core subjects at secondary level which are mandatory, and those which are classified as electives. Regular, Fransaskois, and Bilingual curricula all face their own required courses or credits. Electives may be in the fields of:

- English Language Arts
- Fine Arts
- Home Economics
- Languages
- Mathematics
- Physical Education
- Sciences
- Social Science
- Technology
- Commerce & Computer Education
- Career and Work Exploration

== Post-secondary education, higher education and academia ==
Post-secondary education could be trade or technical training which could be obtained via a vocational school, or university degree programs. First nations make up over 53% of total post secondary students currently enrolled in Saskatchewan.

== Vocational education and training colleges ==
- Certificate, diploma and associate degrees, which take 1–2 years to complete, and consist primarily of coursework.

There are several and various institutions of higher learning across the province, which can be categorized as follows:

- Federated Colleges
- Affiliated Colleges
- Saskatchewan Polytechnic (Formerly SIAST)
- Regional Colleges
- Aboriginal Post Secondary Institutions
- Aboriginal Teacher Education Programs
- Private Vocational Schools
- Saskatchewan's Apprenticeship Program
- Religious Training Institutions
- Distance Learning
- Other Education and Training Program Providers

The Government of Saskatchewan, as well as the Federal Government Department of Labour, have various incentive and funding programs available for post secondary instruction for the trades and technological training programs.

=== See also ===
- Saskatchewan College of Physical Therapists
- Saskatchewan Polytechnic
- Gabriel Dumont Institute

== Universities ==
- Bachelor's degrees, generally the first university degree undertaken, which take 3–4 years to complete, and consist primarily of coursework. Bachelor's degrees are sometimes awarded with honours to the best performing students.

In some courses, honours is awarded on the basis of performance throughout the course (usually in 4yr+ courses), but normally honours consists of undertaking a year of research (like a short thesis or masters by research). If honours is undertaken as an extra year it is known as an honours degree rather than a degree with honours.

- Master's degrees, which are undertaken after the completion of one or more bachelor's degrees. Master's degrees deal with a subject at a more advanced level than bachelor's degrees, and can consist of research, coursework, or a mixture of the two.
- Doctorates, most famously Doctor of Philosophy (Ph.D.), which are undertaken after an honours bachelors or master's degree, by an original research project resulting in a thesis or dissertation. Admission to candidature for a PhD generally requires either a bachelor's degree with good honours, or a master's degree with a research component.
- Higher doctorates, such as Doctor of Science (DSc) or Doctor of Letters (DLitt), which are awarded on the basis of a record of original research or of publications, over many years (often at least 10).

Some Saskatchewan University colleges are:

- Agriculture & Bioresources
- Arts & Science
- Commerce
- Dentistry
- Education
- Engineering
- Graduate Studies & Research
- Kinesiology
- Law
- Medicine (School of Physical Therapy)
- Nursing
- Pharmacy & Nutrition
- Veterinary Medicine

=== See also ===
- Higher education in Saskatchewan
- University of Saskatchewan
- University of Regina
- First Nations University of Canada

== Teaching ==
Missionaries and trading post schools provided the first formal educational process. The first immigrants of the late 19th century and early 20th century established log house schools, or classrooms in homes and a settler with some education from the home country would offer to be the teacher. Normal school offered teacher training and were established as early as 1891 but no enrolment for that year. Until local training was completed and there were graduates, some teachers immigrated from eastern Canada and Europe to teach at the early one room school houses. Teachers from the 1880s through to 1940s taught in one room school houses which offered grades 1 through 8, and, where needed, also grades 9 through 12 with classroom sizes varying from 10 through to 40 students.

Early residents could teach for a short time as permit teachers if there was a shortage of qualified teachers with a level of attainment of a Class 3 provincial certificate (also called Standard X, or Junior. World War I saw a shortage of teachers as women started to work to support families, and men supported the war effort and fought in an overseas theatre of war. The 1920s and 1930s saw many students educated as teachers. Teachers are members of the Saskatchewan Teachers' Federation, an organization created in 1933. An Act Respecting the Teaching Profession of 1935 gives the group statutory recognition to support teachers and the teaching profession.

== Additional options for gifted students ==
Gifted education is a broad term for special practices, procedures and theories used in the education of children who have been identified as gifted or talented. Various schools across Saskatchewan have aimed to fulfill this mandate such as Walter Murray Collegiate Advanced Program, and Mount Royal Collegiate Institute Multi-Directional Approach to Education (MDA) MDA program to name a few.

== Education of students with special needs ==
Attention deficit hyperactivity disorder (ADHD), physical disabilities, intellectual disabilities, behaviorally disordered students, adolescent anger control, are all different forms of special education which classroom teachers address when they are involved in mainstreaming. There are several programs offered from Kindergarten through the elementary and secondary school system.

The Special Education Unit of the Ministry of Education has a variety of services, resources and support for Saskatchewan schools and teachers.

== Extracurricular activities ==
Schools may offer a variety of venues depending upon the demand within the school population. It may vary from student participation in social clubs, intramurals, or sports teams.

- Clubs provide an opportunity for instruction, competition and social interaction.
  - Christian fellowship
  - kayak
  - photography
  - golf
  - outdoor tennis
  - scuba
  - space
  - golf
  - drama
  - chess
  - yearbook
  - band
  - choir
- Intramurals provide students with a variety of sports played at a recreational level.
- In Motion Activities enhance a student's physical well-being, fitness and lifestyle.
- School athletics provide a variety of sport teams and competitive events played to develop a professional level.
  - basketball
  - football
  - soccer
  - curling
  - badminton
  - volleyball

== See also ==
- Saskatchewan College of Psychologists
- Saskatchewan Teachers' Federation
- The Evolution of Education Museum
- Central Pentecostal College
- Saskatchewan Indian Institute of Technologies
- Conseil des écoles fransaskoises
