= Suncrest College =

College in Canada

Suncrest College is a post-secondary educational institution in Saskatchewan, Canada, formed from a merge of Parkland College and Cumberland College on 1st June 2023.

== History ==
=== Parkland College ===
Parkland College
- Motto: Your College. Your Future.
- Type: Public College
- Established: 1973
- Academic affiliations: CICan; Saskatchewan Polytechnic; University of Saskatchewan; University of Regina; Lakeland College; Conestoga College
- Chief Executive Officer: J. Mark A. Hoddenbagh, Ph.D.
- Administrative staff: 220
- Location: Canora; Esterhazy; Fort Qu'Appelle; Kamsack; Melville; Yorkton, Saskatchewan, Canada; 51°36′31.55″N 102°16′18.11″W
- Campus: Urban, Rural
- Colours: Blur & white
- Website: www.parklandcollege.sk.ca

The Parkland College was founded by the Province of Saskatchewan in 1971 as Parkland Regional College (1973-2008). It was renamed Parkland College (2008). The college primarily served the education and training needs of communities and industry partners in east central Saskatchewan and western Manitoba.

=== Cumberland College ===
Cumberland College
- Motto: "Educating above and beyond"
- Type: Public Regional College
- Established: 1974
- Affiliations: CICan, Saskatchewan Polytechnic, University of Saskatchewan, University of Regina, Lakeland College
- President: J. Mark A. Hoddenbagh
- Undergraduates: available
- Location: Nipawin, Saskatchewan, Canada
- Campus: Multiple sites
- Website: http://www.cumberlandcollege.sk.ca/

Cumberland College was a regional college based in Melfort, Nipawin and Tisdale, Saskatchewan, Canada, that provides post-secondary education in the north east region of the province. Cumberland College was founded as Cumberland Community College by the Province of Saskatchewan in 1974, with the first slate of courses being offered in the fall of 1975. It was renamed Cumberland Regional College in 1988 to coincide with a new mandate under the Regional Colleges Act (1986) and an increased regional reach. Around 2008 the College attained its current name. The College primarily serves the education and training needs of communities and industry partners in northeast Saskatchewan.

=== Merger ===
Prior to the merge, Parkland College and Cumberland College shared a president and CEO, focused on improving operational efficiencies (resource use) and enhancing organization effectiveness (impact). Each of the two colleges has its own board of six governors, but the same six governors sat on each board.

== Programs ==
=== Parkland ===
Parkland College offers adult basic education (ABE) and work essential skills training; college programming (business and industry; health care; computer training; general interest); and university programming. The college provides career counselling to students and other support services to help them be successful.

ABE training enables students to obtain a Grade-12 equivalent certificate, which facilitates transition to either post-secondary education or employment. Work essential skills are needed for success in work, learning and life; they are the foundational skills that make it easier to learn all other skills.

College programs are brokered from institutions such as Saskatchewan Polytechnic, Lakeland College (Alberta) and Conestoga College (Ontario) and other institute certificate programs. Select university programs are offered at the undergraduate and graduate level in partnership with the University of Saskatchewan and University of Regina.

Through its wholly owned subsidiary, Western Trades Training Institute (WTTI), Parkland offers Crane and Hoist certification, Boom truck certification, and rigging programs.

=== Cumberland ===
Cumberland College provides academic upgrading, college certificate and diploma, and university programs in a variety of fields and trades. The college provides career counselling to students and other support services to help them be successful.

ABE training enables students to obtain a Grade-12 equivalent certificate, which facilitates transition to either post-secondary education or employment. Work essential skills are needed for success in work, learning and life; they are the foundational skills that make it easier to learn all other skills.

College programs are brokered from institutions such as Saskatchewan Polytechnic and Lakeland College, Alberta. Select university programs are offered at the undergraduate and graduate level in partnership with the University of Saskatchewan and University of Regina.

The college has a robust continuing education program that provides first aid, safety and corporate training to individuals and organizations in its region.

The college has strong ties with Indigenous learners and communities such as Yellow Quill First Nation and Shoal Lake Cree Nation.

== Campuses ==
Those formerly associated with Parkland College are located in Canora; Esterhazy; Fort Qu'Appelle; Kamsack; Melville; and two in Yorkton (the college's Main Campus and the Trades and Technology Centre).

Those formerly associated with Cumberland College are located in Melfort, Nipawin and Tisdale. Additionally, programs are offered in partnership with our Indigenous communities, including the James Smith Cree Nation, Muskoday First Nation and Red Earth First Nation.

== Research ==
The college has a strong agricultural research program in crop science and production that it operates in collaboration with the East Central Research Foundation . The program is funded by industry, producers and government agencies such as the Natural Sciences and Engineering Research Council.

The college has also received funding from the Social Sciences and Humanities Research Council.

== Partnerships ==
The college offers accredited post-secondary education and skills training opportunities for local learners in partnership with the University of Regina, the University of Saskatchewan, Saskatchewan Polytechnic, and the province's other regional colleges.

Parkland College maintains reciprocal arrangements with educational partners, including:

- Dumont Technical Institute
- First Nations University of Canada
- Saskatchewan Indian Institute of Technologies
- Saskatchewan Polytechnic
- University of Regina
- University of Saskatchewan

== See also ==
- Higher education in Saskatchewan
- List of agricultural universities and colleges
- List of colleges and universities in Saskatchewan
