= Parkland College =

Parkland College may refer to:

- Parkland College (United States), an American community college in Champaign, Illinois
- Parkland College (Canada), a post-secondary educational institution in Saskatchewan, Canada
