= Eber Hampton =

American Chickasaw academic and public figure

President of the First Nations University of Canada
- In office 1991–2005

Personal details
- Born: Eber Hampton; 1942 (age 83–84) Talihina, Oklahoma
- Education: Westmont College (B.A.); University of California, Santa Barbara (A.B.D.); Harvard University (Ed.D.)

Eber Hampton is a Chickasaw academic and public figure. Over the course of his career, he has served as president of the First Nations University of Canada (formerly Saskatchewan Indian Federated College) and at the helm of the Harvard American Indian Program. Described as a "Pioneer in Indigenous Education", Hampton previously served on the Canadian Commission for UNESCO.

== Early life and education ==
Born to a Chickasaw family in Talihina, Oklahoma, Hampton grew up in California. After graduating from high school, Hampton enrolled in Westmont College, a private Christian liberal arts college located in Montecito, Santa Barbara County. At Westmont College, Hampton would receive his bachelor's degree in psychology, graduating with honors in 1962. During this time, Hampton says that he suffered a crisis of faith and "strayed from God", stating that “I lived the life of the prodigal for many years in self-destruction and depravity, but always some distant light of goodness kept me from being totally lost".

Hampton would then attend the University of California, Santa Barbara (UCSB) for graduate school, where he studied the psychology of human learning. In the 1980s, enrolled at the Harvard Graduate School of Education, where he received his Doctorate of Education.

== Academic career ==
After leaving UCSB, he received a job offer teaching psychology at Minnesota State University, Mankato. Hampton would later serve as director of the Harvard American Indian Program, and would later move to the U.S. State of Alaska to join the faculty of the University of Alaska. Eventually, Hampton would become associate dean of the College of Rural Alaska.

In 1991, Hampton was appointed President of the First Nations University of Canada. As President, he would preside over the university's formal name change from its previous name, Saskatechwan Indian Federated College, as well as the construction of its new facility, designed by architect Douglas Cardinal. In 2005, during her visit to Saskatchewan, Queen Elizabeth II presented a stone tablet with her initials to Hampton.

== Personal life ==
Hampton's son, John Hampton, is the director of the MacKenzie Art Gallery in Regina, Saskatchewan. His nephew, Adriel Hampton, is an American political figure who ran for Governor of California in the 2022 election. Hampton has served on an array of boards of organizations, including the Advisory Board for the Institute for Aboriginal People's Health and the Canadian Executive Service Organization.

== Published works ==
Academic works by Hampton include:

- "Towards a Redefinition of Indian Education"
- "Alaska Recovery and Spirit Camps: First Nations Community Development"

== Quotes ==
"Racism is an ugly, dirty, nasty word. But the reality is that racism is so much worse than the word."

"Standing on the earth with the smell of spring in the air, may we accept each other's right to live, to define, to think, and to speak."
