= Jacqueline Ottmann =

Canadian academic administrator

10th President of First Nations University of Canada
- Incumbent
- Assumed office September 7, 2021
- Preceded by: Bob Kayseas (interim)

Personal details
- Education: University of Calgary; University of Saskatchewan

Jacqueline Ottmann (Western Ojibwa: Misiaykimigookpaypomoytung) is a Canadian (Saulteaux) academic administrator serving as the tenth president of First Nations University of Canada since 2021.

== Life ==
Ottmann is Saulteaux and a member of the Fishing Lake First Nation. Her first language was Nakawēmowin. Ottmann's indigenous name is Misiaykimigookpaypomoytung (transl. thunder that can be felt over a large landscape). Her mother was a school bus driver and her father was an athlete and coach who was a First Nation chief for thirty years. Ottmann graduated from high school in Wadena, Saskatchewan. After completing a bachelor's degree in education at the University of Calgary, Ottmann worked as a high school and elementary school teacher. She earned a master's degree and Ph.D. in indigenous leadership education at the University of Saskatchewan.

Ottmann was an associate professor and director of indigenous education at the University of Calgary for thirteen years. In 2017, she joined the University of Saskatchewan as its inaugural vice-provost of indigenous engagement. In 2021, she was president of the Canadian Society for the Study of Education; the first indigenous person in the role. She is the founding editor of the peer-reviewed journal, Thrivance: Journal of Indigenous Ways of Being, Knowing and Doing.

On September 7, 2021, Ottmann became the tenth president of the First Nations University of Canada, succeeding interim president Bob Kayseas. She is the first woman to permanently hold the position. In 2025, an internal investigation found Ottmann had engaged in nepotism, mismanagement and ‘empire building’ at First Nations University of Canada.
