= Saskatchewan Polytechnic =

Canadian post-secondary institution

- Motto: Tomorrow in the making
- Type: Polytechnic institution
- Established: 1959; 67 years ago
- Affiliations: CCAA, ACCC, AUCC, CIS, CWUAA, CBIE, CUP.
- President: Larry S. Rosia
- Administrative staff: 2700
- Students: 14,176 full load equivalent (2018); Saskatoon campus: 7,956; Regina campus: 4,444; Moose Jaw campus: 3,192; Prince Albert campus: 2,883
- Location: 1130 Idylwyld Drive North; Saskatoon, Saskatchewan; S7K 3R5; 52°07′42″N 106°39′37″W
- Campus: Saskatoon Moose Jaw Regina Prince Albert
- Colours: Purple and grey
- Website: www.saskpolytech.ca

Saskatchewan Polytechnic (formerly the Saskatchewan Institute of Applied Science and Technology or SIAST /ˈsaɪ.æst/) is Saskatchewan's primary public post-secondary institution for technical education and skills training. It operates campuses in Moose Jaw, Prince Albert, Regina and Saskatoon; and provides a number of courses and programs through distance education.

Saskatchewan Polytechnic maintains reciprocal arrangements with partner institutions, including: Dumont Technical Institute, First Nations University of Canada, Saskatchewan Indian Institute of Technologies, University of Regina, and the University of Saskatchewan.

== Programs ==
Saskatchewan Polytechnic offers over 150 programs in applied/visual media, aviation, basic education, business, community/human services, engineering technology, health services, hospitality/food services, industrial/trades, natural resources, nursing, technology, recreation and tourism, and science. In addition, Saskatchewan Polytechnic provides training to apprentices in several trades.

== Campus ==
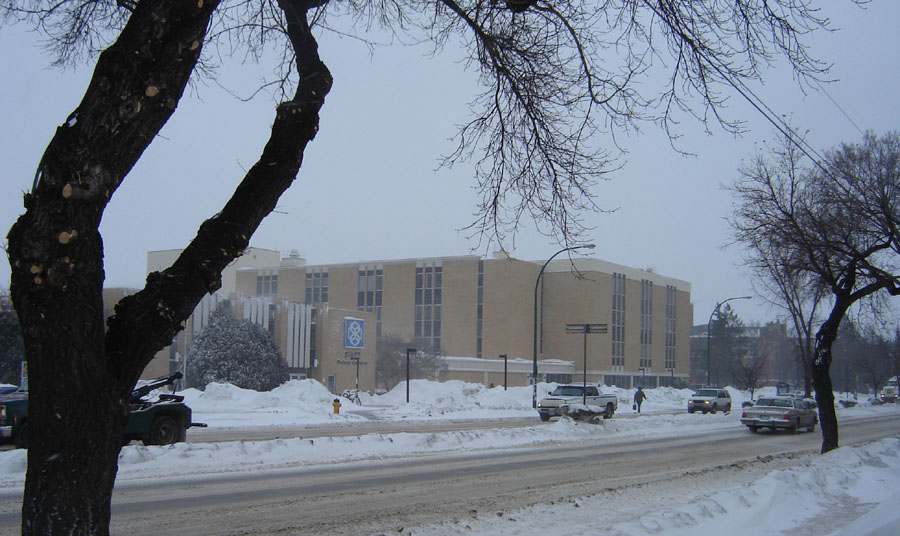
Kelsey Campus in the Central Industrial and Lawson SDA areas of Saskatoon

Saskatchewan Polytechnic comprises four campuses in Saskatchewan:

- Saskatoon (formerly SIAST Kelsey Campus), located on Treaty 6 territory.

Located at Idylwyld Drive North and 33rd Street East (southeast corner) in Saskatoon, the campus is named for Henry Kelsey, a famous fur trader and explorer. The institute in Saskatoon dates back to 1941 when The Canadian Vocational Training School was established to train veterans returning from the war. The campus contains over 13 acres (5.3 ha) of instructional floor space.

- Moose Jaw (formerly SIAST Palliser Campus), located on Treaty 4 territory.
- Regina (formerly SIAST Wascana Campus), also located on Treaty 4 territory.
- Prince Albert (formerly SIAST Woodland Campus), also located on Treaty 6 territory.

== History ==
The four schools that make up Saskatchewan Polytechnic started off as four individual schools. The Moose Jaw Campus started off as the Saskatchewan Technical Institute in 1959. Saskatoon began as the Central Saskatchewan Technical Institute in 1963. Regina began as the Saskatchewan Institute of Applied Arts and Sciences in 1972. Prince Albert began as the Northern Institute of Technology in 1986. On January 1, 1988, The Institute Act and the Regional Colleges Act amalgamated Saskatchewan's technical institutes, urban community colleges and the Advanced Technology Training Centre to form the Saskatchewan Institute of Applied Science and Technology (SIAST). The institution was named Saskatchewan Polytechnic on September 24, 2014.

== Scholarships ==
Saskatchewan Polytechnic joined Project Hero, a scholarship program cofounded by General (Ret'd) Rick Hillier, for the families of fallen Canadian Forces members.

== See also ==
- Higher education in Saskatchewan
- List of colleges in Canada § Saskatchewan
