= Higher education in Saskatchewan =

Higher education system in Saskatchewan, Canada

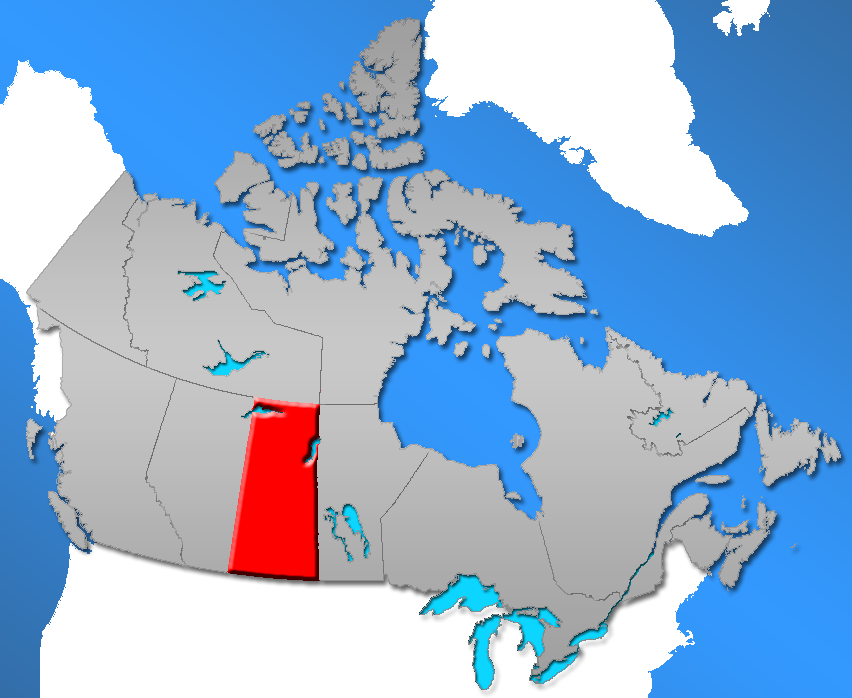
Saskatchewan location in Canada

Higher education in Saskatchewan, Canada, includes several universities and colleges.

== History ==
Historically, Saskatchewan's higher education system has been "significantly shaped" by demographics. In 1901, the urban population in Saskatchewan was 14,266 (16%) while the rural population was 77,013 (84%). One hundred years later, the proportions had changed significantly: urban population in 2001 was 629,036 (64%) while the rural population was 349,897 (36%). The province's higher education system has changed significantly in response both to this demographic shift and to provincial politics.

Saskatchewan became a province on September 1, 1905. In 1907, the University Act created the University of Saskatchewan in Saskatoon. The Methodist Church established Regina College in 1911; fifteen Bible colleges were also established in Saskatchewan between 1928 and 1945. In 1944, following the election of Tommy Douglas and the CCF party, Teachers' colleges were moved into the University, and Regina College became a second campus of the University.

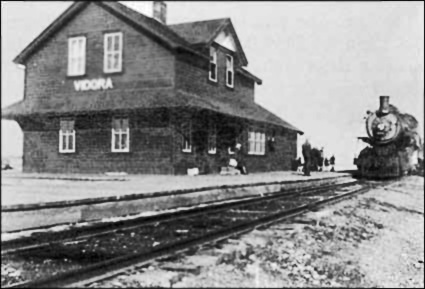
Vidora train station

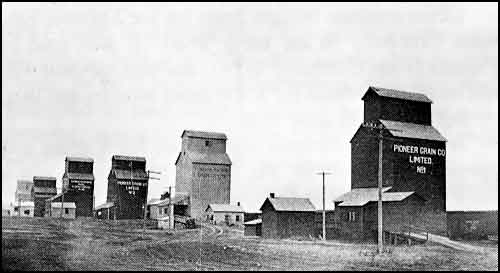
Scotsguard 1920

In 1958, the Moose Jaw Normal School was converted into the Saskatchewan Technical Institute. The Central Saskatchewan Technical Institute opened in Saskatchewan in 1963, followed by the Saskatchewan Institute of Applied Arts and Science in 1972. During this period, in 1964, the Liberals returned to power in Saskatchewan; between 1964 and 1961 they oversaw a program of "expansion and centralization of higher education". In 1972 the NDP (formerly the CCF) were re-elected, and in 1973 the community colleges act was passed. By 1981, there were sixteen regional colleges.

In 1974, the University of Regina became independent.

In 1976 the Saskatchewan Indian Institution of Technologies (SIIT) was established in academic partnership with what was then called the Saskatchewan Institute of Applied Science and Technology (renamed as Saskatchewan Polytechnic in 2014). In 1980 the Métis Nation of Saskatchewan created the Gabriel Dumont Institute of Native Studies. Over the next several years Aboriginal-controlled Institutions would expand to include the First Nations University of Canada, the Dumont Technical Institute, the Northern Teacher Education Program, and the Northern Professional Access College (NORTEP/NORPAC).

In 1982 the Progressive Conservative Party returned to power, abolishing the Universities Commission (established in 1974 by the NDP to coordinate the two Saskatchewan Universities) and establishing the Advanced Technology Training Centre in 1984. In January 1988, The Institute Act and the Regional Colleges Act amalgamated Saskatchewan's technical institutes, urban community colleges and the Advanced Technology Training Centre to form the Saskatchewan Institute of Applied Science and Technology. On September 24, 2014, Saskatchewan Institute of Applied Science and Technology was renamed as Saskatchewan Polytechnic (SaskPolytech) with multiple campuses across the province.

In response to the needs of rural residents, a Distance Education Program Review Committee was created in 1987 by 1989 the Saskatchewan Communications Network had been created to deliver "cultural, informational and educational programming and [act] as an enabler for the regional film and television industry". In September 2011, the SCN re-branded itself and became a commercial entity. It currently has a combination of educational and popular program and no longer remains commercial-free.

Distance education was further expanded with the 2002 creation of Campus Saskatchewan in response to "identified common interests in expanding the use of technology enhanced learning".

From 1992 - 2007, the NDP were again in power in Saskatchewan. Their major policy paper on post-secondary education, Post-Secondary Education Accessibility and Affordability Review,(generally known as the McCall Report was published October 9, 2007. Less than a month later, the NDP were defeated by the Saskatchewan Party. The new Minister, the Honourable Rob Norris, has the following mandate:

[The Ministry of Advanced Education, Employment, and Labour] focuses on three strategic areas to meet its mandate of creating a vital, educated and skilled workforce that meets the labour demands of Saskatchewan employers. The approach is to retain educated and skilled workers in the province, develop a skilled workforce by providing education and training programs, and attract educated and skilled workers and their families from outside of the province and the country by promoting Saskatchewan's opportunities.

Among the first of the new government's actions was to introduce the $12 million Graduate Retention Program intended to address the mandated goal of retaining "educated and skilled workers" in Saskatchewan. The GRP provides a refund up to $20,000 of tuition fees paid by eligible graduates who live in Saskatchewan and who file a Saskatchewan income tax return. It remains to be seen which, if any, of the recommendations of the McCall report will be implemented by the new government.

== Equity and access ==
=== First Nations and Métis students ===
Even a cursory reading of Saskatchewan's post-secondary education history reveals the number and variety of institutions and programs specifically for Aboriginal students. According to Bouvier and Karlenzig,

Compared to other provinces, a relatively high proportion of Saskatchewan's population is Aboriginal (13.5% according to the 2001 census). This proportion is growing, although recently the trend has been slowing down somewhat (Saskatchewan Learning, 2004b: 6-7). In addition the median age (20.1 years) of Aboriginal persons in Saskatchewan is younger than in any other province. Approximately 20% of the province's school-aged population is Aboriginal (Saskatchewan Learning, 2004b: 109). While a high proportion (82%) of First nations students living on-reserve attend First nations schools, most First Nations students living off-reserve as well as Métis students in Saskatchewan are enrolled in the provincial system.

While the interim version of the Post-Secondary Education Accessibility and Affordability Review points out that Saskatchewan was spending "$572 per capita" on post-secondary education, Banks (2007) argues that "[i]f the province were to fund post-secondary education institutions on a per capita basis, then First Nations and Métis institutions, who serve 13.5% of the population should receive approximately $75 million per annum. Instead they receive in the neighbourhood of $7 million per annum from the province."

Given the demographic imperatives and the long-standing commitments to strengthen Aboriginal education in the province, it is difficult to comprehend why McCall recommends: "In the short to medium term, a dialogue must begin among the provincial government, the federal government and Aboriginal people around financial supports for Aboriginal people wanting to enter and complete post-secondary education". Surely we are far beyond ‘beginning a dialogue, particularly since Aboriginal post secondary education institutions have existed in the province since the 1970s. One of the main issues is to recommend increase funding for the teachers education program and other technical and university programs.

While some of this discrepancy is addressed in the 2008-09 Budget (see Finance, below), it remains to be seen how well Saskatchewan's new government will do in terms of increasing access to post-secondary for First Nations and Métis students.

A November 2011 report "Bridging the Aboriginal Education Gap in Saskatchewan" by Eric Howe suggests that the province could experience an economic boom if the Aboriginal population were better educated. Increasing the level of education in this population, the report argues, would better position Aboriginal people to enter the workforce.

One of the main goals The Ministry of Advanced Education Plan of 2015-16 is to increase participation and completion of higher education for all especially for the First Nations and Metis people by designing and delivering effective financial supports for current and future students through the Canada-Saskatchewan Integrated Student Loan, Saskatchewan Student bursaries, grants and scholarships. Non financial support plans include seamless credit transfer between the province post-secondary institutions, increase student accessibility to open education resources, focus on the underrepresented groups on post-secondary attainment and increase enrolment and retaining the people of Aboriginal descent.

=== Rural students ===
For students outside urban centres, Saskatchewan offered online education through Campus Saskatchewan. It was a partnership, directed and managed by members, to support them in developing and advancing inter-institutional initiatives to achieve shared goals and priorities for the use of technology enhanced learning.

To enhance student mobility, the Saskatchewan Council for Admissions and Transfer (SaskCAT) was created to offer an online transfer credit guide called the Saskatchewan Post-Secondary Online Transfer Guide. According to its website, "The Transfer Credit Guide database allows users to search for credits transferable from one Saskatchewan institution to another. It provides information on both Course Equivalency and Program Agreements from either the Sending or Receiving Institution."

However, at its final meeting on December 2, 2009, the Campus Saskatchewan Board of Directors determined that "the Campus Saskatchewan partnership had fulfilled its mandate, and instructed that effective March 31, 2010, the partnership, including the Saskatchewan Council for Admissions and Transfer, would cease operations."

== Structure ==
The higher education system in Saskatchewan includes two universities, the University of Saskatchewan (in Saskatoon) and the University of Regina and their federated and affiliated colleges; the three campuses of the First Nations University of Canada; the four campuses of the Saskatchewan Polytechnic (SaskPolytech); the eight regional colleges; private vocational schools or training institutions; and Aboriginal-run institutions and programs (including the Gabriel Dumont Institute and the Saskatchewan Indian Institute of Technologies).

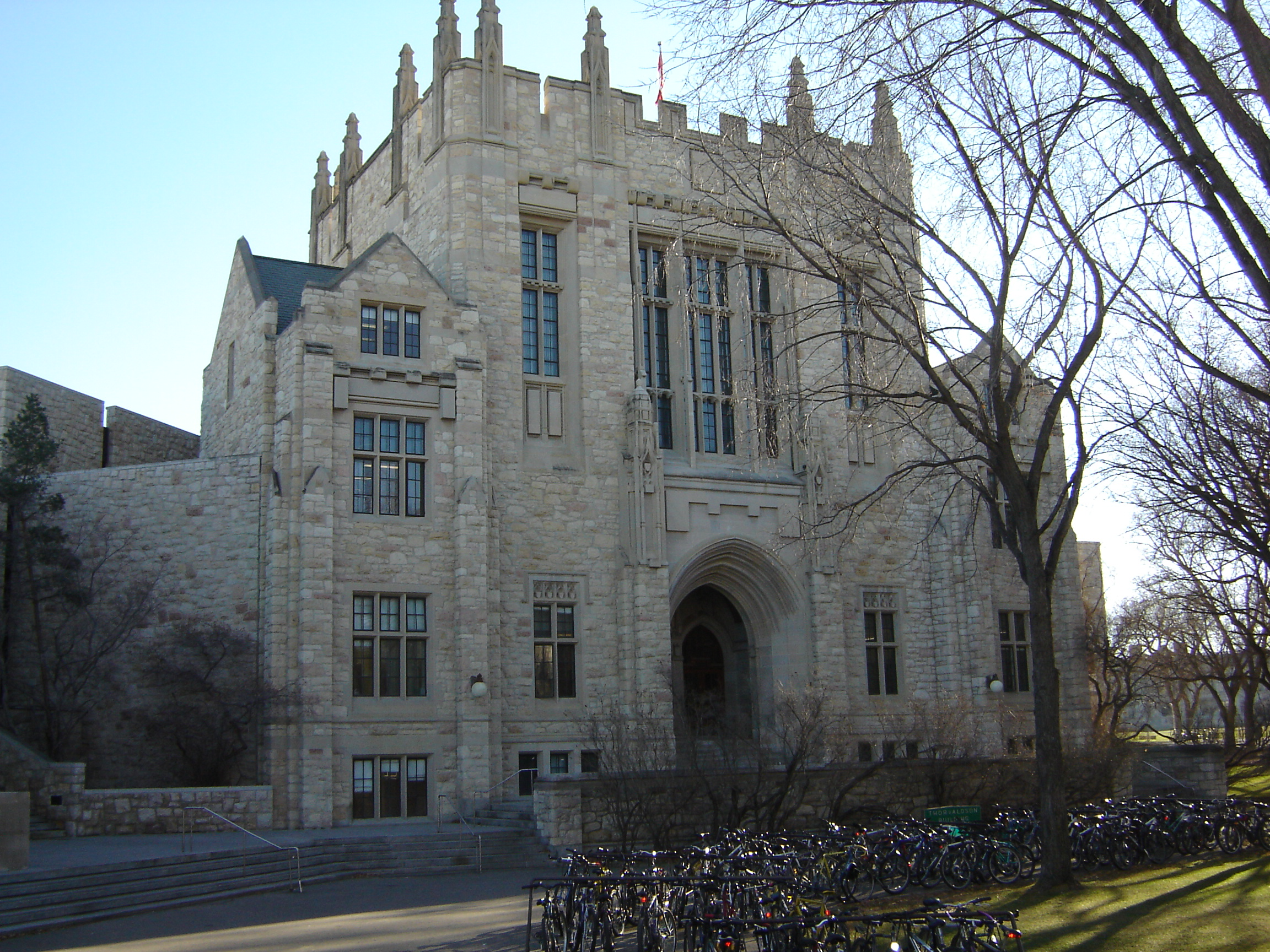
Thorvaldson Building, University of Saskatchewan.

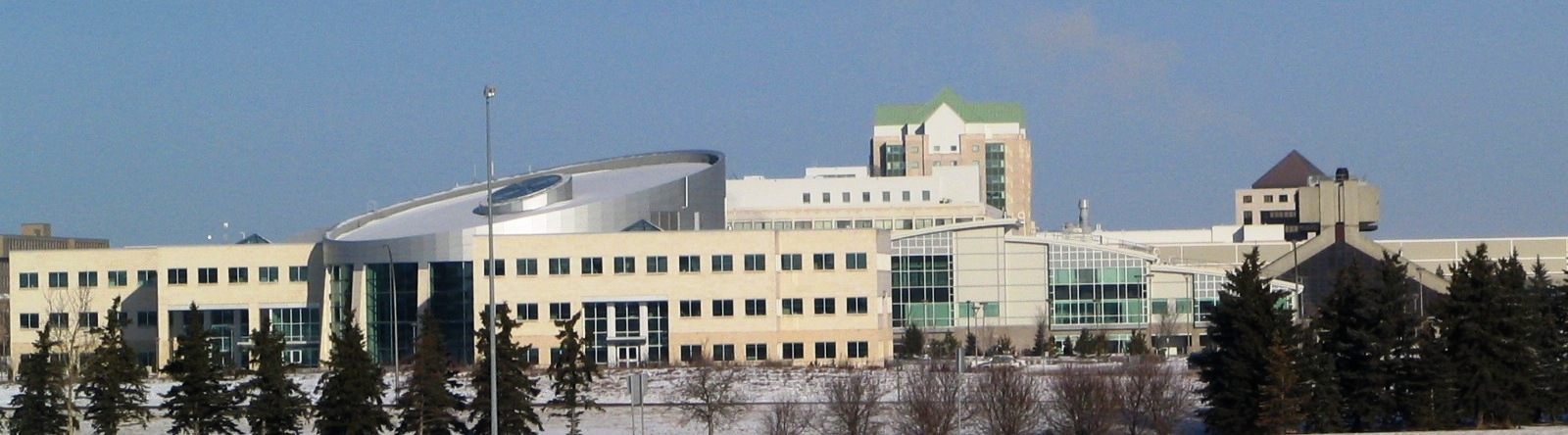
Innovation Place, University of Regina Research Park.

The four federated colleges—Campion College, Luther College, St. Thomas More College and the First Nations University of Canada—are each academically integrated with a university, but legally and financially independent with different governing boards. They generally offer undergraduate Arts and Science degree programs recognized by the universities. Their degrees are conferred by the university which they are federated.

Affiliated colleges are similar to federated colleges but are not academically merged with a university. These institutions—St. Peter's College, Briercrest College and Seminary, the College of Emmanuel and St. Chad, Horizon College and Seminary the Lutheran Theological Seminary, and Andrew's College—offer courses to fill the first and second year Arts and Science requirements for students’ chosen degree programs or to meet the entrance requirements for one of the professional colleges. Most of the Affiliated Colleges are theological colleges.

The Gabriel Dumont Institute and the Teachers’ Education Program also have partnerships with the universities that allow them to offer accredited courses to Aboriginal students and students in the north of the province.

Saskatchewan's eight regional colleges allow students from rural Saskatchewan to access post-secondary education and training from the University of Saskatchewan, the University of Regina and SaskPolytech. Students are also able to access televised and other materials through the Saskatchewan Communications Network (SCN). Some of the regional colleges offer university-transfer programs while others are primarily focused on adult basic education and trades/ technical training.

Two institutions provide services for the Fransaskois or French-speaking Saskatchewan community. Collège Mathieu is a small community college located in Gravelbourg while the Institut français of the University of Regina leads several degree programmes.

== Governance ==
The post-secondary sector in Saskatchewan includes public institutions, Aboriginal-controlled institutions and programming, private vocational schools and apprenticeship programs.

Governance and structure in the public university system are based upon a bicameral system consisting of the Board of Governors (BOG) that governs administration and finance of the institution. The university senate deals with the academic affairs such as curriculum, introduction of new disciplines/programs and hiring of faculty.

=== Public Institutions and Aboriginal-controlled Institutions and Programming ===
The University of Regina and the University of Saskatchewan were established by provincial statute and are regulated by their respective acts: The University of Regina Act and the University of Saskatchewan Act.

The Saskatchewan Polytechnic was established through The Saskatchewan Institute of Applied Science and Technology Act, 1986 (amended 1996). Saskatchewan Polytechnic is govern by the Board of Directors (BOD) who manage the business of Saskatchewan Polytechnic, the board ensures accountability to the minister responsible for Saskatchewan Polytechnic and the people of Saskatchewan. The institution adopts the corporate model of governance by having the President/CEO who manages the money. In addition, there is the Provost/VP who is in charge of budget management, planning and implementation of research projects. Lastly, the CFO/VP of Administration who is also the VP of Strategy and Advancement who oversees capability development within the faculty and staff. The Dumont Technical Institute is federated with Saskatchewan Polytechnic and is the adult upgrading and technical training arm of the Gabriel Dumont Institute of Native Studies and Applied Research, created and operated by the Métis Nation of Saskatchewan.

The Regional Colleges Act created the regional colleges to provide adult basic education and skills training to people in areas of the province without easy access to post-secondary education.

The First Nations University of Canada is technically a federated college (its degrees are conferred by the University of Regina); "it is the only First Nations-controlled post-secondary institution in Canada that operates in partnership with a university". According to their website,

the Saskatchewan Indian Federated College Act of the Legislative Assembly of the Federation of Saskatchewan Indian Nations (FSIN) established the Saskatchewan Indian Federated College (SIFC) (now the First Nations University of Canada) as an institution that is administratively and financially autonomous, but academically integrated with the University of Regina. The SIFC Act specifies the composition and responsibilities of the board of governors. Two members of the board are appointed directly by the Federation of Saskatchewan Indian Nations (FSIN). Other members are appointed by the senate, Agency/Tribal Councils of Saskatchewan, Saskatchewan universities, Department of Indian and Northern Affairs Canada, Saskatchewan Learning, First Nations University of Canada faculty and the First Nations University of Canada Students' Association.

In November, 2005, the All-Chiefs’ Task Force on the Future of the First Nations University of Canada released a report outlining their findings and recommendations following a forensic audit of the First Nations University of Canada. The report identifies "institutional governance [as] the most important of its recommendations." The 2007 FNUC Board of Governors has 27 members, including Chiefs, Grand Chiefs, students, and both federal and provincial representatives. As recently as May 6, 2008, the Canadian Association of University Teachers (CAUT) was contemplating censuring FNUC (or "FNUniv" as CAUT and others call the institution) "unless the university agrees to remedy gross violations of basic university governance principles, address concerns about academic freedom and respect collective agreements it has negotiated". As of June 24, 2008, CAUT was reporting some progress in discussions with FNUniv.

The Saskatchewan Indian Institute of Technologies (SIIT) is administered under The Saskatchewan Indian Institute of Technologies Act, 2000. It is governed by a board composed of senators, Saskatchewan Tribal Council appointees, and a Federation of Saskatchewan Indian Nations executive member. Recently, SIIT's key goals for the year 2014 through 2019 focuses on responding to the needs of students ensuring that the graduates possess the necessary skills and knowledge to cultivate as self-motivated and continuous learners as well as contributing members of their respective communities. Other goals include improving the quality of the academic staff, becoming an institution that values ethical leadership, maintaining transparency and accountability to itself and its stakeholders.

The Gabriel Dumont Institute of Native Studies and Applied Research (GDI) is the educational institution created and operated by the Métis Nation of Saskatchewan. The institution is governed by a Board of Governors that oversees the institute's direction and operational duties. Members of the board are selected from each of the 12 Metis Nations regions around Saskatchewan. This includes a Chairperson who is a Metis person and also the Saskatchewan Minister of Education. It is "the only wholly Métis owned and controlled education institution of its kind in Canada," according to the Canadian Information Centre for International Credentials.

The Northern Teacher Education Program (NORTEP) is accredited by the University of Saskatchewan, the University of Regina, and the First Nations University of Canada. The Saskatchewan Urban Native Teacher Education Program (SUNTEP) "is a four-year, fully accredited Bachelor of Education program, offered by the Gabriel Dumont Institute in cooperation with Saskatchewan Learning, the University of Regina and the University of Saskatchewan. The program is offered in three urban centres--Prince Albert, Saskatoon, and Regina."

=== Private Vocational Schools ===
Private Vocational Schools are regulated by the Saskatchewan Advanced Education and Employment, Training Institutions Branch under the authority of the Private Vocational Schools Regulation Act, 1995 and the Private Vocational Schools Regulations, 1995. According to the Canadian Information Centre for International Credentials:

The legislation requires that institutions, programs, and instructors be registered with the ministry. The ministry does not directly evaluate private vocational school programs for quality. However, registration and monitoring of program, curricula, including a review of labour market research to support new programs, affects quality. The Canadian Education and Training Accreditation Commission (CETAC) is a national association that accredits Canadian private vocational schools at the institutional level. Accreditation is voluntary.

=== Apprenticeship programs ===
The Saskatchewan Apprenticeship and Trade Certification Commission (SATCC) oversees apprenticeship programs in Saskatchewan. According to their website,

Saskatchewan's Apprenticeship and Trade Certification Act 1999 establishes the Commission as a Corporation and Agent of the Crown. A Board of twenty or fewer members is appointed by the Provincial Government. The majority of the members of the Board are selected by industry, equally representing employers and employees. The Commission Board also has representation from Saskatchewan Polytechnic (formerly SIAST), the Provincial Government and equity groups. The Commission reports to a Minister of the Provincial Government who is responsible for the administration of the Act, usually the Minister of Advanced Education and Employment. The Apprenticeship and Trade Certification Act 1999 authorizes the Commission to manage the Apprenticeship and Trade Certification system.

According to the SATCC strategic plan for 2012, key strategies include training which is to increase the number of individuals to move through the apprenticeship program seamlessly. Support which is to increase the effectiveness between SATCC with government, industry, public and underrepresented groups especially women, First Nations, Metis and immigrants. SATCC will also look into securing funding from the provincial government and relevant stakeholders to support labor market training needs. Identify the long term and short terms needs for industrial training, apprenticeship numbers and skills. Lastly, SATCC plans to enhance its operational efficiency to meet stakeholders needs.

=== Campus Saskatchewan ===
As a partnership of provincial post-secondary institutions and the government, Campus Saskatchewan was established in 2002 "to use technology-based learning to increase access to post-secondary studies in the province". Partners in Campus Saskatchewan are the following: Gabriel Dumont Institute/Dumont Technical Institute, First Nations University of Canada, Saskatchewan Indian Institute of Technologies (SIIT), Saskatchewan Advanced Education and Employment (ex officio), Saskatchewan Polytechnic (formerly SIAST), Saskatchewan Regional Colleges, University of Regina, and University of Saskatchewan. Effective March 31, 2010, Campus Saskatchewan, including the Saskatchewan Council for Admissions and Transfer, ceased operations.

== Funding ==
According to the 2014-15 budget, the Saskatchewan Ministry of Advanced Education, Employment, and Labour has a total budget of $668.9 million for post-secondary institution operating grants and targeted funding. Spending plans include the following:

- $82 million for the Graduate Retention Program, which will provide tuition rebates of up to $20,000 for post-secondary graduates from Saskatchewan who stay in the province for seven years after graduation.
- $488.7 million for Saskatchewan's universities, federated and affiliated colleges.
- $151.9 million for technical institutes
- $28.3 million in operating and program funding for regional colleges.
- $37.4 million for other ongoing provincial tax credits related to educational costs and interests paid on student loans.

The 2014–15 budget also extends to student funding:

- $32.5 million in student aid fund.
- $31 million for the Provincial Training Allowance.
- $7.5 million for the Saskatchewan's Advantage Scholarship.
- $5 million for the Saskatchewan Innovation and Opportunity Scholarship.

The government continues to invest in the training of doctors and nurses and that includes:

- $14.3 million for the final year of the Registered Nurse seat expansion to 690 seats.
- $13.7 million to continue the implementation of 100 new medical undergraduate seats.
- $10.4 million to continue the implementation of 120 new medical residency seats.
- $360,000 in funding to increase the number of nurse practitioner training spaces by 5.
- $578,000 in new funding to double the number of ongoing Perioperative Nursing training seats at SaskPolyTech from 18 to 36.

The budget of 2014–15 provides $189.1 million includes more support for Aboriginal students and training programs.

- $6 million to double funding for Joint Task Force Initiatives, First Nations organization and human services providers and funding to help expand Help Me Tell My Story to on and off reserve schools.
- $49 million for funding of First Nations and Metis institution and initiatives.

According to CAUT, over the period 1993–1994 to 2004–2005, only British Columbia (2%) and Saskatchewan (24%) increased provincial funding to post-secondary education. In 2005, tuition represented 29% of University Operating Revenue in Saskatchewan, with 60.6% of operating revenue coming from (presumably both provincial and federal) government.

=== Student funding ===
- The Saskatchewan Ministry of Advanced Education, Employment and Labour oversees a number of programs to assist current and potential students. A selection is listed below.
- Adult Basic Education (ABE) refers to a wide range of services, credit, and non-credit programs designed to help adult learners achieve their goals.
- Credit Transfer (CT) is the process by which credit is granted towards a credential by one institution for programs or courses previously completed at a recognized institution.
- Employability Assistance for People with Disabilities (EAPD) program provides funding to assist adults with disabilities to prepare for, secure and maintain employment.
- Employment Programs (including SaskJobs and SaskNetWork) can help individuals transition into and within the workforce.
- General Educational Development (GED) tests measure the academic skills and knowledge expected of high school graduates. Recognized throughout North America, the GED Testing Program has served as a bridge to education and employment. The GED Tests provide a reliable vehicle through which adults can certify that they possess the major and lasting outcomes of a traditional high school education.
- Graduate Retention Program (GRP) is a refundable income tax credit to rebate up to $20,000 of tuition fees paid by eligible graduates. This initiative replaces the previous Graduate Tax Exemption beginning January 1, 2008.
- Graduate Tax Benefit Programs from 2000 to 2007, the Government of Saskatchewan had two previous graduate tax benefit programs for graduates from post-secondary programs.
- The Innovation and Science Fund (ISF) will provide funding to Saskatchewan universities, colleges and research institutes to support projects.
- Institutional Quick Response Training (Quick Skills) provides funds to public training institutions to train the unemployed to meet industry requirements for skilled workers. Training should lead to ongoing permanent employment. The program also provides access to credit training in rural and northern Saskatchewan.
- JobStart/Future Skills links training to employment. The program provides a range of skills training solutions for Saskatchewan people.
- Joint Task Force – Aboriginal Education and Employment is an agreement with the Federation of Saskatchewan Indian Nations (FSIN) was signed on May 17, 2011, to establish a joint task force on aboriginal education and employment, to consult on and identify practical, grass-roots solutions for eliminating current gaps in education and employment outcomes for First Nations and Métis people in Saskatchewan.
- Prior Learning Assessment and Recognition (PLAR) is a systematic process that assesses and recognizes an individual's knowledge and skills regardless of where or how the learning was acquired.
- Provincial Training Allowance (PTA) is grant funding to assist with the costs of living for low income adult students enrolled in basic education and bridging programs. In addition, the PTA provides assistance for Quick Skills Training of four to eleven weeks for programs not funded by student loans.
- Qualification Recognition (QR) practices involve the fair, credible, and standardized assessment of credentials to assist employers, educational institutions and professional regulatory bodies in making informed decisions.
- Recognizing Prior Learning (RPL) is a broad concept which values all learning that people have gained in their lives.
- Skills Training Benefit (STB) is a program is to assist clients who are EI eligible to return to the labour market as quickly as possible and to improve their employability.
- Student Employment Experience (SEE) program is a year-round funding program for Saskatchewan employers to hire students.

=== Student loans ===
The Canada-Saskatchewan Integrated Student Loans Program offers a needs based supplement to your existing resources to help fund students' education.

Student/Participant Placement Injury

Procedures in the event of a Student/Participant Injury on a Work-based Learning Placement or Work Placement.

Targeted Initiative for Older Workers (TIOW)

The Ministry of Advanced Education, Employment and Labour is working in partnership with the Federal government to deliver a two-year initiative to help older workers be reintegrated into the workforce.

Technology Enhanced Learning (TEL)

Saskatchewan post-secondary institutions and the ministry work together through the provincial TEL Action Plan to extend access to education and skills training and enrich learning by adapting technology-based tools, teaching methods and resources to meet the diverse needs of learners, both on- and off-campus.

Interprovincial Health Training Agreement (IHTA)

Saskatchewan has interprovincial agreements with post-secondary institutions in other provinces to reserve seats in specific health discipline programs for Saskatchewan students. Programs offer training in health disciplines that are critical to the labour market in Saskatchewan.

== Future directions and challenges ==
Given Saskatchewan's booming economy and recent change of government, the shape of higher education in the province may be changing.

In an address to the Canadian Society for the Study of Higher Education on June 3, 2008, Parkland Regional College now Parkland College CEO Dr. Fay Myers observed that the goals of Saskatchewan's Regional Colleges need to change in response to the booming economy. She argues that the Regional Colleges need to take a "collaborative systems approach" to providing education in Saskatchewan and must be aware "of global forces" while developing "innovative industry partnerships" and "provid[ing] niche training."

According to the Saskatchewan Party's 2011 platform document, Moving Saskatchewan Forward, the province will be a place where "young people have the best educational and career opportunities." Their platform outlines a plan for a Saskatchewan Advantage Grant for Education Savings in which the government will match 10% of the annual contribution to a child's RESP, to an annual maximum of $250. Their platform also commits to "creating more training opportunities, including improving education and employment outcomes for First Nations and Métis people.

The effect the Saskatchewan Party will have on the higher education system in Saskatchewan remains to be seen. With the possible expansion of degree-granting institutions, the examination of how the Regional colleges serve the province and a recent agreement signed between the Federation of Saskatchewan Indian Nations and The Government of Saskatchewan to work together to establish a Joint Task Force on Improving Education and Employment Outcomes in Saskatchewan, higher education in the province is expected to continue to change.

Despite improved infrastructure to Aboriginal controlled institutions and increased funding to help improve the lives of the First Nations and Metis community, the government must think of long term effective strategies to improve their educational status without compromising their traditional culture and values while integrating them into mainstream Canadian society.

== Associations ==
The following organizations may be of interest to people who want to know more about issues in post-secondary education in Saskatchewan and Canada. Each is described by a snippet quoted from the association's "about us" page.

Association of Colleges and Universities of the Canadian Francophonie formerly Association of Universities of the Canadian Francophonie
Created on April 1st, 2015, this new association consists of 20 francophone or bilingual post-secondary institutions from Nova Scotia, New Brunswick, Prince-Edward Island, Ontario, Manitoba, Saskatchewan, Alberta and British Columbia. The ACUFC aims to provide increased access to quality post-secondary education in French throughout Canada.

Colleges and Institutes Canada formerly Association of Canadian Community Colleges
The Association of Canadian Community Colleges (ACCC) is the national, voluntary membership organization created in 1972 to represent colleges and institutes to government, business and industry, both in Canada and internationally.

Polytechnics Canada

Universities Canada formerly Association of Universities and Colleges of Canada
The Association of Universities and Colleges of Canada is the voice of Canada's universities.

Canadian Association of University Teachers
Founded in 1951, representing 55,000 teachers, librarians, researchers and other academic professionals and general staff.

Canadian Federation of Students
The Canadian Federation of Students and the Canadian Federation of Students-Services were formed in 1981.

Saskatchewan Apprenticeship and Trade Certification Commission
Saskatchewan's Apprenticeship and Trade Certification Act 1999 establishes the Commission as a Corporation and Agent of the Crown. The Commission Board also has representation from SIAST, the Provincial Government and equity groups. The Commission reports to a Minister of the Provincial Government who is responsible for the administration of the Act.

University of Saskatchewan Faculty Association
The Faculty Association was founded in 1952 to negotiate salaries and other benefits with the Board of Governors of the University of Saskatchewan. On January 26, 1977, the USFA was certified under the Trade Union Act.

University of Regina Faculty Association
The University of Regina Faculty Association (URFA) is a professional organization for members of various bargaining units on the University of Regina campus. We are a member of the Canadian Association of University Teachers (CAUT), and the Saskatchewan Association of University Teachers (SAUT). URFA serves as the collective bargaining agent for approximately 1200 full and part time members.

Saskatchewan Polytechnic Faculty Association
The Saskatchewan Polytechnic Faculty Association (SPFA), formerly known as the SIAST Faculty Association (SFA), is a professional organization and the sole bargaining agent of the academic employees of Saskatchewan Polytechnic.

== Chronology ==
1905 The Saskatchewan Act is passed and the province of Saskatchewan is formed. The Liberal Party forms the first government.

1907 The Act establishing the University of Saskatchewan is passed.

1911 The Methodist Church registers the first students in Regina College, which becomes a second campus of the University of Saskatchewan in 1925, then becomes the University of Regina in 1974.

1930 The Progressive Conservative Party is elected.

1934 The Liberal Party is returned to power.

1941 Saskatchewan's population is 67% rural 33% urban.

1944 Tommy Douglas (CCF) is elected Premier of Saskatchewan. The province passes the first Saskatchewan Apprenticeship Act, which provides a system for the training and certification of apprentices and the trades.

1952 The first National Conference on Apprenticeship in Trades and Industries provides a stimulus for the development of the Red Seal program.

1959 Saskatchewan's first technical school, the Saskatchewan Technical Institute, opens in Moose Jaw. The University of Saskatchewan offers for the first time an Arts and Science degree at Regina College.

1961 July 1, Regina College is renamed the University of Saskatchewan, Regina Campus.

1963 A second technical institute, The Central Saskatchewan Technical Institute, opens in Saskatoon.

1964 The Liberal Party is elected.

1971 The NDP (formerly the CCF) is elected. This is also the same year that Parkland Regional College is established (1971–2008). It is later renamed Parkland College (2008).

1972 Chaired by Ron Faris, the Minister's Advisory Committee on Community Colleges is established to develop a plan for community colleges in the province. The Department of Continuing Education is established to coordinate post-secondary education in Saskatchewan. The Faris Report recommends the establishment of community colleges in Saskatchewan. The Saskatchewan Institute of Applied Arts and Sciences is established in Regina.

1973 The Community Colleges Act is passed, establishing the community college system in Saskatchewan. The Hall Commission, consisting of Emmett Hall, Stewart Nicks and Gordon Sout, is established to examine the need for a university in Regina.

1974 The University of Regina is established.

1976 The Saskatchewan Indian Community College is established. The Saskatchewan Indian Federated College is established at the University of Regina.

1980 The Gabriel Dumont Institute of Native Studies and Applied Research is established.

1982 The Progressive Conservative Party is elected.

1985 Saskatchewan Indian Community College is renamed the Saskatchewan Indian Institute of Technology.

1986 Prince Albert's Northern Institute of Technology opens.

1988 Saskatchewan passes the Regional Colleges Act, renaming the community colleges regional colleges, reducing their number, and restructuring them as the Saskatchewan Institute of Applied Science and Technology.

1992 The NDP is elected. The Dumont Technical Institute is established to serve the educational and technical needs of Saskatchewan's Métis, as the adult upgrading and technical training arm of the Gabriel Dumont Institute of Native Studies and Applied Research.

2000 The Saskatchewan Indian Institute of Technologies Act is passed to establish the Saskatchewan Indian Institute of Technologies, which provides adult basic education, post-secondary training programs, and related educational programs.

2002 Campus Saskatchewan is established.

2003 On June 21, National Aboriginal Day, the Saskatchewan Indian Federated College is renamed The First Nations University of Canada.

2006 NDP Premier Lorne Calvert commissions Advanced Education, Employment, and Labour Minister Warren McCall to produce an extensive review of the post-secondary sector.

2007 October 9: the NDP's Post-Secondary Education Accessibility and Affordability Review is published. November 7: The Saskatchewan Party is elected.

2008 Parkland Regional College is renamed Parkland College.

2010 Campus Saskatchewan, including the Saskatchewan Council for Admissions and Transfer, ceased operations. In the same year, both the federal and Saskatchewan governments cuts more than $12 million in funding for First Nations University of Canada over allegations of financial mismanagement. Its board was dissolved and administration put on leave by Federation chiefs.

2011 Province is considering expanding degree granting beyond the University of Saskatchewan and the University of Regina. "Expansion of Degree – Granting Status in the Province of Saskatchewan Report on Consultations and Recommendations" is published by Alex Usher. In April, Dr. Brian Gillespie was nominated to lead Quality Assurance Review to develop a quality assurance review process that could be used to assess applications for new degree-granting institutions and programs in Saskatchewan.

2011 An agreement was signed between the Federation of Saskatchewan Indian Nations and the Government of Saskatchewan to work together to establish a Joint Task Force on Improving Education and Employment Outcomes in Saskatchewan. The agreement commits to improving early childhood outcomes, increasing high school and post-secondary completion rates and improving participation in the labour market and employment rates.

2011 Saskatchewan's Regional Colleges: Towards a New System is published, examining a new future for the regional colleges of the province. Also in 2011, the Saskatchewan Party and Premier Brad Wall are re-elected. This is the same year that Bridging the Aboriginal Education Gap in Saskatchewan by Eric Howe is published, suggesting increased education of the Aboriginal population in the province is key to creating an economic boom.

2014 The Saskatchewan Party and Premier Brad Wall are re-elected. This same year, the University of Regina celebrated 40 years of independence. This is the same year that University of Saskatchewan fired President Ilene Busch-Vishniac, and SIAST is renamed as Saskatchewan Polytechnic.

== See also ==
- List of universities in Canada
- List of colleges in Canada
- List of business schools in Canada
- List of law schools in Canada
- List of Canadian universities by endowment
- Higher education in Canada
- Education in Saskatchewan
