= Alberta Rural Development Network =

Rural Development Network
- Founded: 2009
- Type: Nonprofit Organization
- Purpose: Rural, Remote, and Indigenous community, social, and economic development.
- Headquarters: Edmonton, Alberta
- Location: Edmonton, Alberta, Canada
- Region served: Canada
- Products: Guides, Toolkits, Housing and Service Needs Estimations, Housing Development Needs Assessments, Research, Product Development, Online Training, In-Person Facilitation, Community Engagement, Asset Mapping, and Shared Services
- Method: In-Person, Virtual, Hybrid
- Members: 9
- President & Chief Executive Officer: Melissa Fougere
- Key people: Melissa Fougere President & CEO, Dr. Glenn Mitchell (Board Chair)
- Employees: 16
- Website: https://ruraldevelopment.ca/
- Formerly called: Alberta Rural Development Network

The Rural Development Network (RDN), formerly the Alberta Rural Development Network (ARDN), is an Alberta-based organization purposed towards supporting development in rural communities in Canada.

The Rural Development Network (RDN) is a national nonprofit organization based in Alberta, Canada, dedicated to strengthening rural, remote, and Indigenous communities. RDN works alongside local partners to co-create practical, evidence-based solutions that address housing and homelessness, newcomer settlement, and community and economic development challenges.

Established in 2009, RDN was created as a partnership of Alberta's 21 public post secondary institutions.

RDN publishes a newsletter, The Rural Connector Newsletter, once a month.

== History ==
Alberta Rural Development Network (ARDN) began operations in 2009 with a grant from the Rural Alberta Development Fund (RADF) and in-kind commitments from its post-secondary members.

Since its inception, RDN has worked with several of Alberta's colleges, universities and organizations on projects, including Lakeland College and Portage College on a Regional Innovation Network in East Central Alberta, Mount Royal University on a Business Retention & Expansion Symposium, the Alberta Academy of Art and Design on the Company of Albertans, Pastor Tim Wray on the Young Adult Photovoice Project, and Lethbridge College on Social in the South. More recently RDN has been supported by funders such as Alberta Real Estate Foundation to complete research and community engagement through Enabling Housing Choice, Enabling Housing Choice North Canadian Mortgage and Housing Corporation Guide and checklist for affordable housing in Canada, and Responding to Veterans Homelessness in Rural, Remote, and Indigenous communities funded by the Government of Canada, Veterans and Well-Being Fund.

The Rural Development Network is the Reaching Home Community Entity for Rural and Remote Alberta, and is responsible for distributing this funding from the Government of Canada to rural and remote organizations and communities across the province to address and respond to homelessness. These communities include First Nation and Métis Settlement communities amongst others.

RDN helps communities identify needs, access funding, and design sustainable, locally-driven initiatives. Our work includes:

- Affordable Housing & Homelessness: Supporting communities to assess housing needs, plan affordable housing projects, and prevent rural homelessness.
- Settlement & Inclusion: Helping newcomers successfully integrate into rural communities and strengthen local workforce capacity.
- Community Development & Research: Providing consulting, data, and research tools—like our Sustainable Rural Community Index—to help decision-makers and funders understand and invest in rural priorities.

Approach

We believe that rural voices must shape rural solutions. Through collaboration, applied research, and capacity-building, RDN helps communities overcome systemic barriers, leverage local strengths, and create measurable social, environmental, and economic impact.

Funding

The Rural Development Network (RDN) is a Canadian non-profit organization that receives funding through a combination of government, philanthropic, and fee-for-service sources. The organization’s primary funding comes from project-based and program-specific grants provided by federal and provincial governments, including Canada Mortgage and Housing Corporation (CMHC), Employment and Social Development Canada (ESDC), and Immigration, Refugees and Citizenship Canada (IRCC). At the provincial level, RDN has received support from the Government of Alberta through various ministries focused on housing, community development, and social services.

RDN also collaborates with and receives contributions from municipalities, Indigenous governments, and regional alliances to deliver locally driven housing and community development initiatives.

The organization’s work has been supported by a range of charitable and private foundations, including the Alberta Real Estate Foundation, the Tenaquip Foundation, the United Way, and other philanthropic funders that invest in community resilience, housing innovation, and rural sustainability.

In addition to grants and contributions, RDN generates earned revenue through its fee-for-service activities, which include research, consulting, evaluation, training, and data analysis for rural, remote, and Indigenous communities across Canada.

RDN adheres to non-profit accountability and transparency standards.

== Members ==
- Keyano College
- Lethbridge Polytechnic
- Lakeland College
- Medicine Hat College
- Northern Lakes College
- Olds College
- Portage College
- University of Calgary
