= Saskatchewan Teachers' Federation =

Canadian trade union

- Abbreviation: STF
- Formation: 1933; 93 years ago
- Type: Trade union; professional association
- Headquarters: Saskatoon, Saskatchewan, Canada
- Location: Saskatchewan, Canada
- Members: 14,000 (2026)
- President: Samantha Becotte
- Executive director: Angela Banda
- Affiliations: Canadian Teachers' Federation
- Website: stf.sk.ca

The Saskatchewan Teachers' Federation (STF) is a professional association and trade union representing schoolteachers in the Canadian province of Saskatchewan. The organization's headquarters is located in Saskatoon.

== History ==
The roots of the Saskatchewan Teachers' Federation were planted in 1919, when a teachers' strike in Moose Jaw—said to be the first of its kind in Canada—led to the establishment of a formal teachers' organization. In 1933, amidst the Great Depression, early teachers' groups disbanded and re-organized as the STF to create a provincial organization; STF organizers enrolled more than ninety percent of teachers. Then, in 1935, the Saskatchewan provincial government passed legislation requiring all teachers to be members of the organization.

== Teachers' strike in 2024 ==
In July 2023, negotiations between the STF and the Saskatchewan provincial government came to a standstill, with the STF criticizing the provincial government for its "[lack of] movement" on what they considered to be the biggest issues in the Saskatchewan education system: class size and complexity. Around the same time, billboards titled "A Fair Deal for Teachers" were put up by the provincial government around the province, with the government claiming that proposed salary increases would result in a salary larger than the average teacher's salary in western Canada. Labour relations expert Andrew Stevens said that he saw these billboards as an attempt to simplify the collective bargaining process to a "simplified and convenient number" and to polarize the public.

On October 27, 2023, a large majority of teachers in Saskatchewan voted in favour of job sanctions, with STF president Samantha Becotte saying that the province had refused to budge on certain matters and had shut down nine out of ten proposals during collective bargaining talks.

The following year, in early January 2024, the union announced a strike, following a third-party conciliator report suggesting teachers and the provincial government "could bargain class size and complexity", something the government has insisted is not up for negotiation, preferring instead to focus on compensation. The union had another strike on January 22, eventually leading to rotating teacher strikes. On April 5, 2024, the STF announced indefinite work-to-rule would begin the following Monday, meaning that all extracurricular activities and other voluntary work done by STF, such as noon hour supervision, would be withdrawn for the foreseeable future.

On April 12, 2024, the union announced their plans to pause all job sanctions in the province after returning to the bargaining table. The union was offered a slight wage increase over the next three years and began voting in early May, but this received an overwhelming rejection from the teachers, with 90% of teachers of the union voting against the offer. On May 30, 2024, a slim majority of teachers rejected another offer from the province, with 55% voting against; this was after this second offer was endorsed and recommended by STF leadership. The offer included additional funding as well as the creation of a task force to address classroom complexity, but nothing explicitly addressing class size was included in the proposed agreement.

== See also ==
- Canadian Teachers' Federation
- Education in Saskatchewan
