= Lakeland College (Alberta) =

College in Alberta, Canada

- Former names: Vermilion School of Agriculture; Vermilion Agricultural and Vocational College; Vermilion College
- Motto: Ever to Excel
- Type: Public college
- Established: November 17, 1913
- Academic affiliations: CICan, AACTI, CBIE
- President: Alice Wainwright-Stewart
- Students: 2,233 (2023-24 fulltime equivalent)
- Location: 2602 59 Avenue, Lloydminster, Alberta, Canada; 53.3502°N 110.8648°W
- Campus: Urban/suburban/remote, multiple campuses Lloydminster and Vermilion
- Nickname: Rustlers
- Sporting affiliations: CCAA, CCAA
- Mascot: Rowdy
- Website: www.lakelandcollege.ca

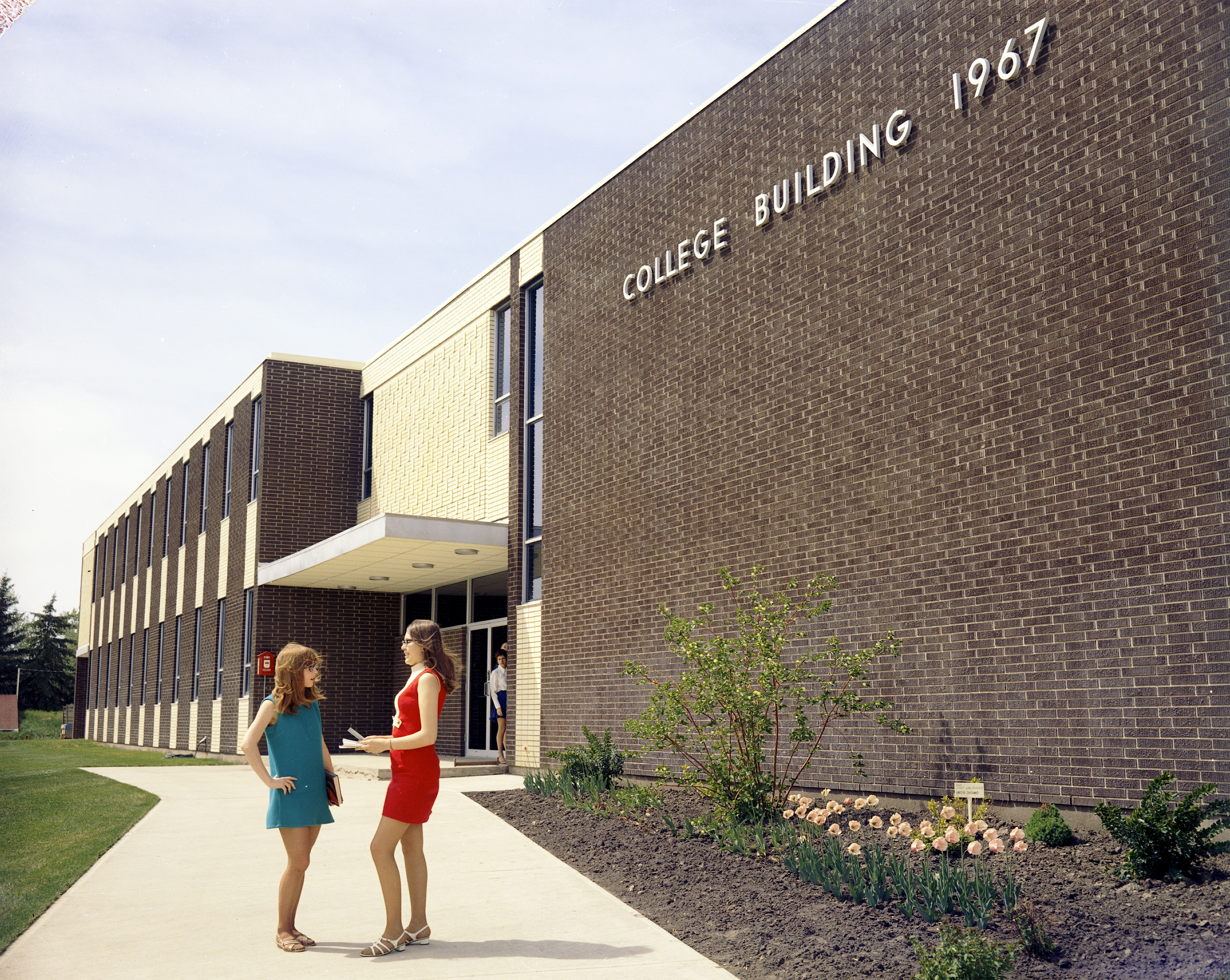
Vermilion Agricultural and Vocational College, 1970

Lakeland College is a post-secondary college in Alberta, Canada. It is publicly funded, and maintains two campuses in Vermilion and Lloydminster. Lakeland serves over 7,000 students through the academic year with 2,223 studying full- and part-time.

Canada's only inter-provincial college, Lakeland College serves both Alberta and Saskatchewan residents, following a partnership agreement between the governments of the two provinces in 1975. The city of Lloydminster straddles both sides of the Alberta-Saskatchewan provincial border. Lakeland College is a member of Colleges and Institutes Canada (CICAN) and the Alberta Rural Development Network.

== Student-managed farm ==
Lakeland College hosts one of only a half dozen student-managed working farms in Canada, and is one of the largest in North America. There are two components—crops and livestock. Note: There are several farming for credit operations at institutions throughout North America, however most are in the one to 15 ac range.

Lakeland College's Student-Managed Farm powered by New Holland includes both crops and livestock.

Students in the crop technology program use the student managed farm (SMF) to hone modern grain farming skills such as machinery operation, grain, oilseed and specialty crop marketing, management of farm finance and operation and utilization of GPS and GIS technology. Students enrolled in Crop Technology actively participate in harvesting the crop on the 2,300-acre (931 ha) farm. During the fall and winter, students market, harvest and plan the crops to be seeded in spring.

The Animal Science SMF started in the 2008–09 academic year. Students choose from purebred beef, commercial beef, dairy, sheep and research units.

== History ==
In 1908, the Vermilion Board of Trade lobbied the provincial government for a demonstration farm. In 1911, the provincial government purchased land near seven Alberta communities including just west of the Vermilion townsite. The Vermilion farm became the Vermilion School of Agriculture (VSA) in 1913. On November 17, 1913, VSA was the first of three agricultural colleges to be opened that year. The other schools were in Olds and Claresholm.

The first class had 34 students, all male. By March, home economics courses had been added and female students also came to VSA.

During the 1918 influenza pandemic the college suspended classes and was used as a makeshift hospital.

College classes were moved to Olds during the Second World War, with the campus being used as a training center for the Canadian Women's Army Corps.

In the 1960s with the rise in vocational training, the college's name was changed to Vermilion Agricultural and Vocational College. It changed again to simply Vermilion College. When both the Alberta and Saskatchewan governments begin promoting regional facilities, Vermilion College became Lakeland College in 1975. It was established as Canada's first, and to date only, interprovincial college with regional campuses in eastern Alberta and western Saskatchewan. Today only the Vermilion and Lloydminster campuses remain.

Lakeland College Emergency Training Centre (formerly the Alberta Fire Training School and then fire etc.) is located adjacent to the Vermilion campus. The facility originally opened in 1959 as the Fire Officers Training School.

== Programs ==
Although established to provide agricultural training, Lakeland has branched out beyond agriculture while maintaining those roots. Today Lakeland students take agricultural sciences, business, environmental sciences, fire and emergency services, health and wellness, human services, interior design technology, apprenticeship and pre-employment trades training, street rod technologies and university transfer.

Students in the interior design technology program have won numerous national and international student design contests. To date it is the only Canadian program endorsed by the National Kitchen and Bath Association (NKBA). The program has also been recognized with Excellence in Education Awards from the NKBA.

Its Appraisals and Assessment program is one of only three colleges and universities licensed in Canada to teach real property assessment (the program licensor is the University of British Columbia). Students receive a certificate in Real Property Assessment from the University of British Columbia.

Fire and emergency training programs draw students from across Canada as well as other countries. The Emergency Training Centre offers pre-professional, municipal and corporate training in fire, pre-hospital and other emergency response programs. The emergency services technologist program is the only one of its kind in Canada. Students train in both fire and emergency medical response, then specialize in one of those disciplines.

== Scholarships and bursaries ==
In 2013, during its centennial year, Lakeland gave out more than $1 million in awards, scholarships and bursaries to its students.

The college joined Project Hero, a scholarship program cofounded by retired General Rick Hillier for the families of fallen Canadian Forces members.

The Government of Canada sponsors an Aboriginal Bursaries Search Tool that lists over 680 scholarships, bursaries and other incentives offered by governments, universities and industry to support Aboriginal post-secondary participation. Lakeland College scholarships for Aboriginal, First Nations and Métis students include TransAlta Aboriginal Educational Awards. A new bursary program for Aboriginal students established by the Crown Investments Corporation of Saskatchewan and Lakeland College is now available at Lakeland College. Up to 20 new bursaries (each $5,000 annually) will be awarded to qualifying Saskatchewan Aboriginal students (Indian, Inuit and Métis) enrolled as full-time students in Lakeland College programs beginning in fall 2010.

== Buildings and features ==
Both campuses have recreation facilities (including an aquatic centre in Vermilion), libraries and theatres. The Vic Juba Community Theatre is located at the Lloydminster campus. Alumni Hall Theatre is at the Vermilion campus.

Alumni House is an original structure still in use on the Vermilion campus. First a home for the demonstration farm manager it has been the president's home and the officers' mess for the Canadian Women's Army Corps during the Second World War. It also housed the alumni office for four decades. The historic building is a bed and breakfast facility open to the public.

The Lloydminster campus was officially opened in 1990. Previously the college used other buildings in different locations around the city for training. The initial campus building also included a residence village that housed workers building the Husky Heavy Oil Upgrader before it became a home away from home for college students.

== Applied research ==
As a demonstration farm from its beginnings, the college has always had an element of applied research. This was revived in a big way in 2010 with the award of a $2.3 million grant from the National Sciences and Engineering Research Council of Canada's College and Community Innovation Program.

In 2013, Lakeland College was named one of the top 50 research colleges in Canada in an inaugural list developed by Research Infosource Inc.

== Athletics ==
The Lakeland College Rustlers compete in the Alberta Colleges Athletic Conference in basketball, curling, volleyball, soccer, futsal and cross country running.

The Rustlers rodeo team is part of the Canadian Intercollegiate Rodeo Association.

The rowing crew competes against post-secondary institutions in Western Canada. In 2013, the women's novice eight crew repeated as gold medalists at the Western Canadian University Rowing Championships.

In 2013, Lakeland College hosted its first Canadian Collegiate Athletics Association championships. The women's volleyball championships were presented by Viterra and held on the Lloydminster campus from March 7–9, 2013. Lakeland College earned its first national medal, a silver, while the gold went to Fraser Valley Cascades (PACWEST).

In 2017 the women's volleyball team made history again by winning national gold after the provincial championship. They added their third national medal, a bronze, in 2018.

== See also ==
- Canadian government scientific research organizations
- Colleges and Institutes Canada
- Alberta Colleges Athletic Conference
- Canadian Interuniversity Sport
- Canadian university scientific research organizations
- Education in Alberta
- Education in Saskatchewan
- List of agricultural universities and colleges
- List of universities in the Canadian Prairies
