= List of colleges and universities in Saskatchewan =

For lists of colleges and universities in Saskatchewan, see:

- List of colleges in Canada § Saskatchewan
- List of universities in Canada § Saskatchewan
