= The Evolution of Education Museum =

Evolution of Education Museum
- Established: 1963
- Coordinates: 53.178793°N 105.759012°W
- Type: Education Museum
- Website: Evolution of Education Museum

The Evolution of Education Museum is a museum operated by the Prince Albert Historical Society in Prince Albert, Saskatchewan, Canada.

The one-room schoolhouse in which the museum is housed was built in 1920 and used as a school until 1963. This school was originally located 20 miles northeast of Prince Albert and is named after Clayton Smith who was a postmaster. The state of the school now is extremely close to how it was once decorated. It has desks, a library, and many artifacts from school days in the early 20th century Saskatchewan.

== Affiliations ==
The museum is affiliated with: CMA, CHIN, and Virtual Museum of Canada.
