= Saskatchewan College of Psychologists =

Canadian provincial organization for regulating the practice of psychology

The Saskatchewan College of Psychologists is the organization charged with regulating the practice of psychology in the Canadian province of Saskatchewan. The act which provides this organization with its power was proclaimed in 2002, while the legislation was submitted in 1997.

The Saskatchewan College of Psychologists superseded the prior regulatory body, the Saskatchewan Psychology Association which has been incorporated in 1962. The 2002/1997 act created a unique professional practice, not used anywhere else where persons with master's degrees (M.A. or M.Ed.) are entitled to style themselves as "registered psychologists" and those with doctorates (PhD, PsyD) are called "registered doctoral psychologists". Also uniquely in this jurisdiction, the legislation separates the authorization to diagnose from the authorization to practice.

== Structure of the College ==
The college's organization consists of an executive council which assigns member of the college to committees. Some committees consist of non-psychologists in addition. The College website lists the officers of the college and members of the committees, except for the Professional Conduct Committee.

The college's act is one of 29 professions to be using the same regulatory act and discipline procedures as created by a lawyer committee chaired by Merrilee Rasmussen in 2007.
