= Saskatchewan Indian Institute of Technologies =

Coordinates: 52°07′48″N 106°35′16″W

- Former name: Saskatchewan Indian Community College
- Type: Public comprehensive community college
- Established: 1976
- Affiliations: ACCC, CCAA, AUCC,
- President: Riel Bellegarde
- Students: 2500+
- Location: Saskatoon, Saskatchewan, Canada
- Campus: Urban (Saskatoon), rural
- Colours: Blue
- Mascot: Eagle
- Website: www.siit.ca

The Saskatchewan Indian Institute of Technologies (SIIT) is a First Nations-operated post-secondary institution offering training and educational programs in Saskatchewan, Canada.

== History ==
SIIT was established in 1976 as the Saskatchewan Indian Community College, and assumed its present name in 1985. On July 1, 2000, the Saskatchewan government recognized SIIT as a post-secondary institution through the enactment of the Saskatchewan Indian Institute of Technologies Act.

== Campus ==
SIIT has three campuses, ten JobConnections locations, two mobile training and employment units, and over 35 community learning sites throughout the province.

== Governance ==
It is governed by a Board of First Nation Chiefs, Tribal Council appointees. SIIT is also a non profit organization that operates within the provincial post-secondary system.

== See also ==
- Higher education in Saskatchewan
- List of agricultural universities and colleges
- List of colleges in Canada#Saskatchewan
