= First Nations University of Canada =

Federated college of the University of Regina

- Other name: Saskatchewan Indian Federated College (1976–2003)
- Type: Federated college
- Established: May 1976; 50 years ago
- Affiliations: AUCC
- Academic affiliations: University of Regina
- President: Jacqueline Ottmann
- Students: c.1,180 (2023)
- Location: Saskatchewan, Canada; 50°25′10″N 104°34′56″W
- Campus: Regina campus Saskatoon campus Prince Albert campus
- Website: fnuniv.ca

The First Nations University of Canada (abbreviated as FNUniv) is a post-secondary institution and federated college of the University of Regina, based in the Canadian province of Saskatchewan. FNUniv operates three campuses within the province, in Prince Albert, Regina, and Saskatoon. The university offers academic programs in business, the humanities, social sciences, and sciences; including a number of programs focused around Indigenous practices.

The institution originates from the Saskatchewan Indian Federated College (SIFC), a federated college established in May 1976 through an agreement between the Federation of Saskatchewan Indian Nations and the University of Regina. In June 2003, the institution was renamed the FNUniv, with its new Regina campus opened later that year.

== History ==
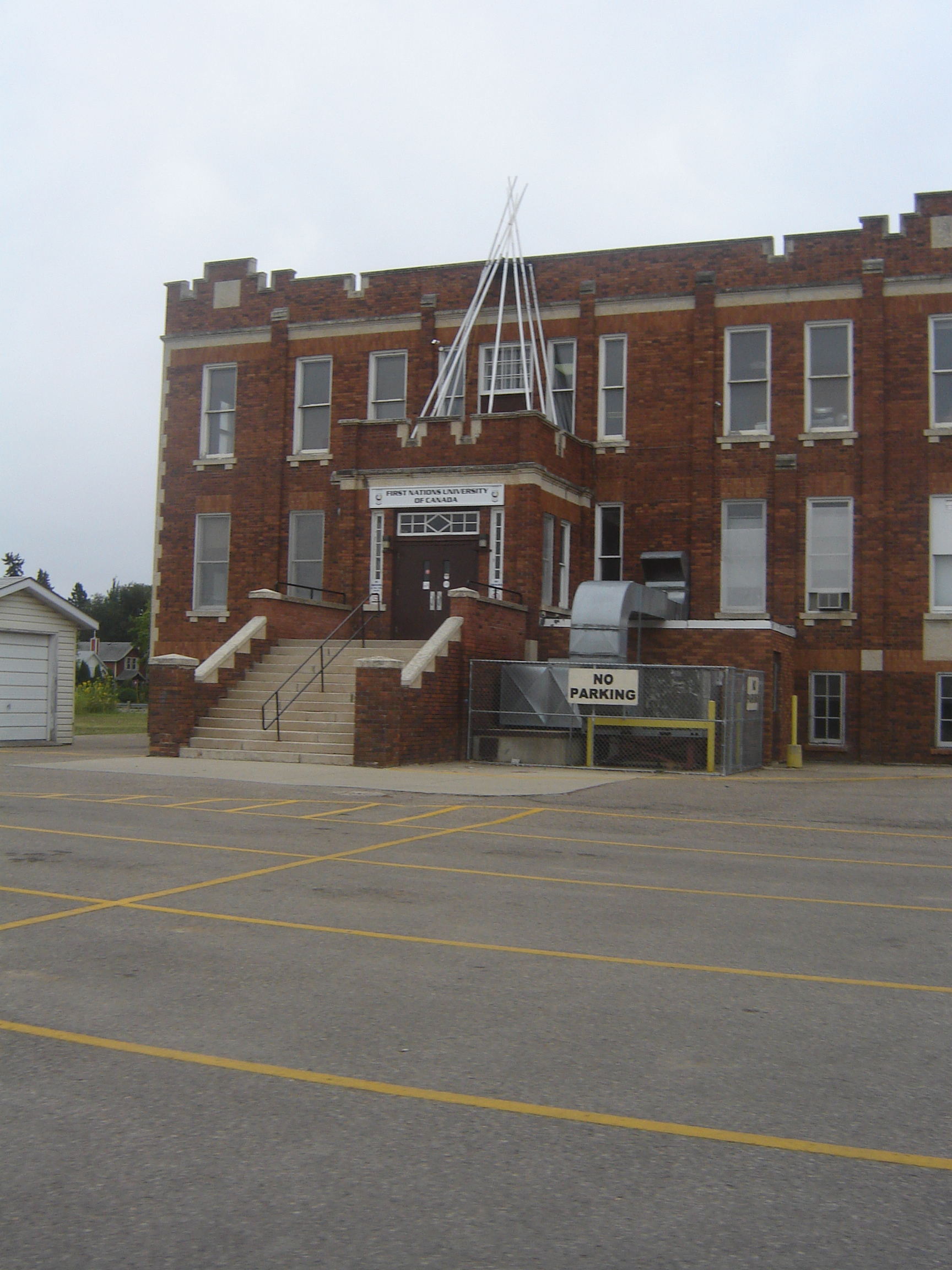
The old Saskatoon campus building in the City Park neighbourhood of Saskatoon. The building housed the Saskatoon campus from 1994 to 2010.

FNUniv originated from the Saskatchewan Indian Federated College. The Saskatchewan Indian Federated College was affiliated with the University of Regina upon its foundation in 1976. SIFC was established through an agreement between the Federation of Saskatchewan Indian Nations and the University of Regina formalized in May 1976, with the stated intent of serving "the academic, cultural and spiritual needs of First Nations' students".

On 23 June 2003, under the leadership of university president Eber Hampton, the institution was renamed the FNUniv. The Earl of Wessex opened the university's Regina campus in 2003. Queen Elizabeth II, Queen of Canada, made it her first engagement during the centennial celebrations of Saskatchewan and Alberta in 2005.

This stone was taken from the grounds of Balmoral Castle in the Highlands of Scotland – a place dear to my great great grandmother, Queen Victoria. It symbolises the foundation of the rights of First Nations peoples reflected in treaties signed with the Crown during her reign. Bearing the cipher of Queen Victoria as well as my own, this stone is presented to the First Nations University of Canada in the hope that it will serve as a reminder of the special relationship between the Sovereign and all First Nations peoples.

— Elizabeth II at the First Nations University of Canada, 2005

Star Blanket Cree Nation has proposed a plan to declare the institution's property an Urban Indian reserve under a Saskatchewan Treaty Land Entitlement Agreement involving Star Blanket, the provincial and federal governments. Band members of the Star Blanket Nation unanimously voted in favour of this plan during a 2008 referendum.

== Campuses ==
There are three campuses,

- Regina Campus: 1 First Nations Way, Regina (on the campus of the University of Regina)
- Saskatoon Campus: Asimakaniseekan Askiy Urban Reserve 230 – 103B Packham Avenue
- Northern Campus: 1301 Central Ave, Prince Albert

The top two and a half floors of its Regina campus building were formerly leased as office space to Indigenous Affairs and Northern Development Canada (AANDC) until 2014. The Regina campus building was designed by the architect Douglas Cardinal.

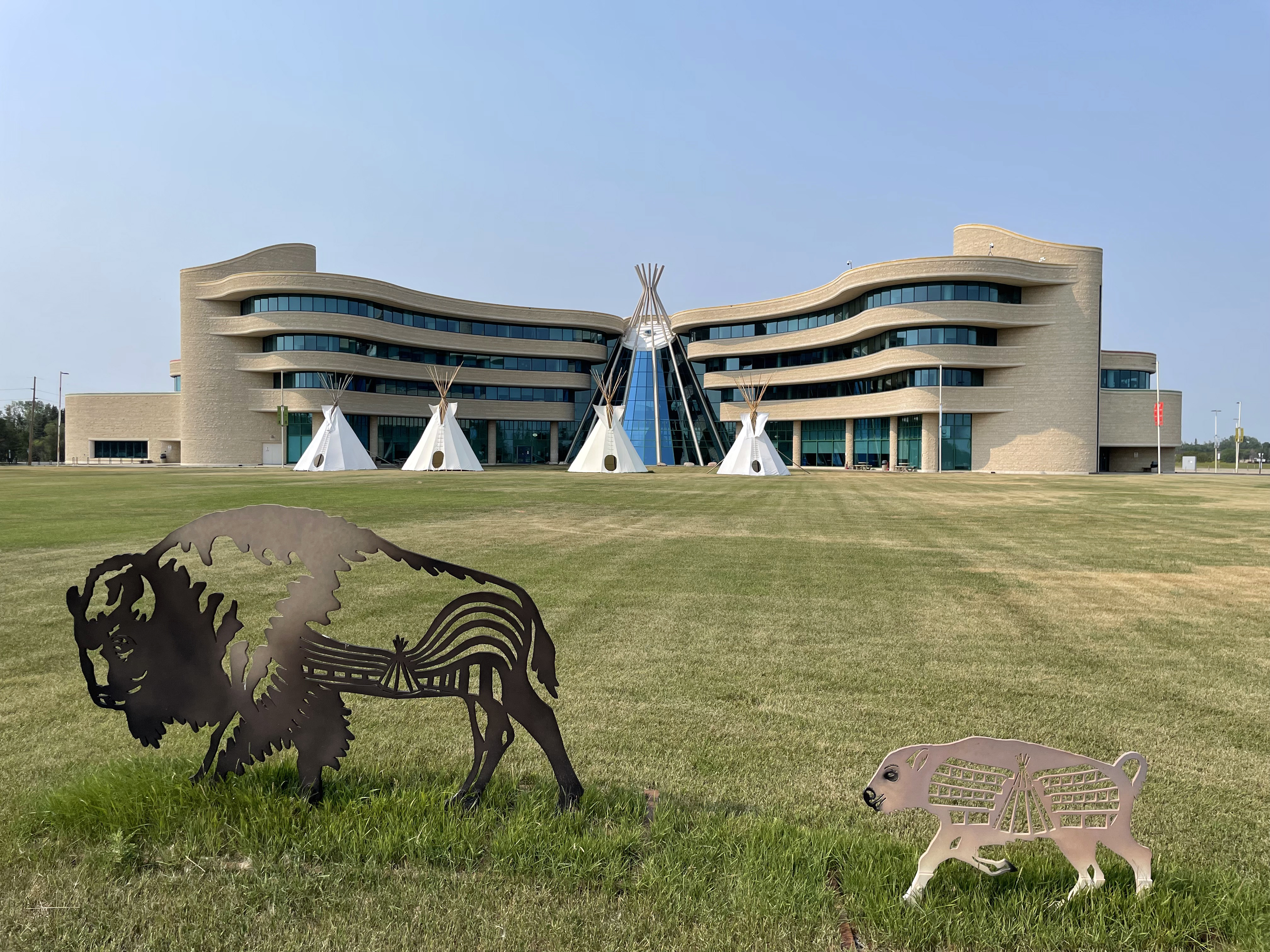
Exterior facade of the university's Regina campus

Each FNUniv campus features a library, with strengths relating to the subjects and disciplines taught at each campus (Indigenous Studies, Indian Fine Arts, Education, and Business at Regina campus; Indigenous Social Work at Saskatoon campus; and Indigenous Health Studies and Education at Prince Albert campus). The FNUniv libraries have, since 1976, been affiliated with the University of Regina library. FNUniv students and faculty may utilize the FNUniv libraries, as well as the University of Regina library and its other affiliated college libraries (Campion and Luther).

== Academics ==
Although it is called the FNUniv and is recognized as a university by the Saskatchewan Government, the institution is actually a federated college of the University of Regina, and degrees earned at the institution are conferred by the University of Regina. The enabling legislation is The University of Regina Act. FNUniv is open to students of all cultures and nationalities and is not restricted to those of First Nations descent.

=== Indigenous programs ===
The university designed special programs in partnership with Indigenous communities to meet the human resource needs of Indigenous communities in areas such as health, education and the environment – examples include its National School of Dental Therapy, Nursing and Health Studies programs. A special first-year bridging programs for Indigenous students is provided, with Indigenous Elders present on campus to provide social supports. FNUniv offers a comprehensive career services program to meet the vocational problems of Indigenous students.

== Student life ==
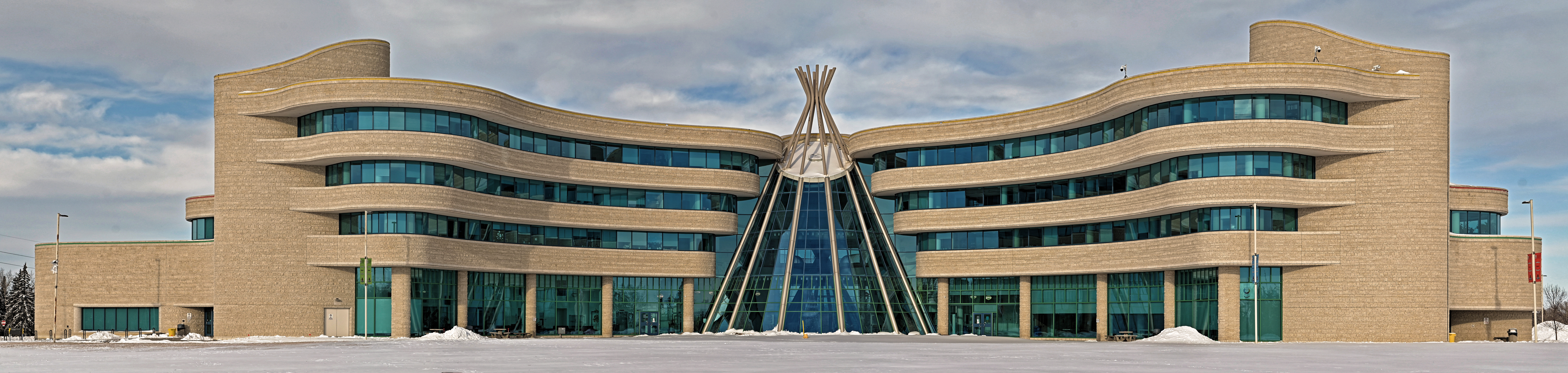
High Resolution image of the University

FNUniv students at the Regina campus pay regular U. of R. related and University of Regina Student Union fees. Like the other federated colleges of Luther and Campion, FNUniv students may utilize all of the U. of R. facilities (libraries, book stores, clubs, parking, labs, etc.) and services (meal plans, residences, online services, career counselling, etc.). The FNUniv degree programs are correlated with the rest of the U. of R. curriculum.

=== Financial support ===
The Government of Canada sponsors an Indigenous Bursaries Search Tool that lists over 680 scholarships, bursaries, and other incentives offered by governments, universities, and industry to support Indigenous post-secondary participation.

== Controversies ==
=== Professional standing ===
In May 2007, the university was put on probation by the AUCC, following a controversy in February 2005 in which the university fired a number of staff members. The association demanded the university establish full independence from the Federation of Saskatchewan Indian Nations within a year. The university complied with the AUCC directives, and was reinstated in April 2008.

In November 2008, the Canadian Association of University Teachers voted unanimously to censure FNUniv and asked its members not accept jobs, honours or awards at the university. Changes made relating to academic freedom, governance and political autonomy were reported to be reason for the censure vote. The censure was lifted in April 2010 after the university made very significant governance changes.

=== Financial support ===
In October 2008, the government of Saskatchewan gave the university $1.6 million to relieve a chronic budget deficit. The money was given to cover salaries of faculty and operating expenses. Another $400,000 was to be spent on a review of the university's long-term operations.

In February 2009, the provincial government withheld $200,000 of funding. Lack of progress in solving the institution's problems was cited as the reason. By March 18, enough progress had been made for the government to release half the frozen funds.

In June 2009, the federal government withheld $2.4 million in funding, saying it wanted to see changes at the institution before the money would be handed over. University officials responded by accusing the federal and provincial governments of being uncooperative and unnecessarily negative in their attempts to address alleged governance problems. On February 3, 2010, the provincial government of Saskatchewan officially suspended funding the FNUniv effective April 1, 2010. The next day, the FNUniv's board of governors was dissolved. On February 8, 2010, the Canadian federal government announced it would cease funding the University, effective March 31, 2010. However, on March 23, 2010, the province of Saskatchewan restored funding. In June 2010, the federal government announced the provision of $4 million of support in response to the changes in governance that were underway; however, these funds would be administered on behalf of FNUniv by the University of Regina.

=== Staff problems ===
In January 2009, Shauneen Pete was dismissed from her position as Vice-President of Academics for what the university administration said was an internal personnel matter. On January 13, the FNUniv Students' Association organized a rally in protest.

Two former employees of the institution, Janet Lee Kurtz and Wesley Robert Stevenson, were charged with defrauding the university of the amounts of $21,000 and $15,000 respectively. Both pleaded guilty, were ordered to make full restitution, and agreed to perform community service.

In December 2009 the university's chief financial officer, Murray Westerlund, left his position. Westerlund said he was fired, but FNUniv's then-president, Charles Pratt, said that the departure was mutually agreed upon. FNUniv officials also missed another series of deadlines to file various reports, which led the federal government to withhold $1.8 million in funding.

In January 2010, documents from November 2009 surfaced which showed that Westerlund had raised concerns about inappropriate spending. Westerlund filed a wrongful dismissal lawsuit against the university on December 17, 2009. The suit claims he was marginalized and then fired for writing the documents which criticized the spending practices of university officials. The provincial Minister of Advanced Education, Rob Norris, called for an emergency meeting with the University of Regina's board of governors to discuss the financial situation at the FNUniv. After the meeting on January 27, Norris hinted that the provincial government may cut off funding to the institution.

In March 2010, it was discovered that nearly $400,000 of the FNUniv's scholarship fund had been spent on general operations. The fund had dwindled from $390,000 in spring 2009 to $15,000 in February 2010.

On March 19, 2010, Charles Pratt was terminated by the Interim Board of Governors, with cause, as President of FNUniv; he had previously been suspended with pay. Allan Ducharme, the former Vice-president of Administration, was fired on the same day. Dr. Shauneen Pete, who had formerly been dismissed from a leadership post at FNUniv, was appointed as President in April 2010 for a six-month term.

In August 2012, Charles Pratt and Allan Ducharme reached an out-of-court settlement and FNUniv issued a statement as a part of that settlement, which stated in part "that neither Mr. Pratt nor Mr. Ducharme were found to be in dereliction of their respective duties nor guilty of any financial impropriety".

In October 2025, CBC reported that a confidential Deloitte report had found that President Jacqueline Ottmann engaged in "empire building, nepotism, and financial policy violations". The majority of the FNUniv board voted to keep Ottmann leading to the resignation of two board members who voted to fire her.

== See also ==
- Alfred Young Man, former department head of Indian Fine Arts
- Higher education in Saskatchewan
- Blue Quills University
- List of tribal colleges and universities
