= List of English-language educational institutions in Quebec =

This is a list of English-language educational institutions in Quebec.

== English-language school boards ==
- Central Quebec School Board includes Quebec City, Mauricie, and Northern Quebec
- Eastern Shores School Board on Lower North Shore
- Eastern Townships School Board in Eastern Townships
- English Montreal School Board in central and eastern Montreal
- Lester B. Pearson School Board on West Island of Montreal
- New Frontiers School Board
- Riverside School Board on South Shore of Montreal
- Sir Wilfrid Laurier School Board in Laval and Laurentians
- Western Quebec School Board in Gatineau and Outaouais
- Commission scolaire du Littoral on the Lower North Shore

== English-language private schools ==
- Stanstead College
- Bishop's College School
- Lower Canada College
- The Study
- Miss Edgar's and Miss Cramp's School (ECS)
- Selwyn House School
- Kells Academy
- Kuper Academy
- College Prep International
- North Star Academy Laval
- West Island College
- Greaves Adventist Academy

== English-language colleges ==
- TAV College in Montreal
- Heritage College in Gatineau
- Collège Universel - Campus Gatineau in Gatineau
- Dawson College in Montreal
- Marianopolis College in Westmount
- Vanier College in Montreal
- John Abbott College in Sainte-Anne-de-Bellevue
- Campus Lennoxville of the Champlain Regional College in Lennoxville
- Campus Saint-Lambert of the Champlain Regional College in Saint-Lambert
- Campus Saint-Lawrence of the Champlain Regional College in Sainte-Foy
- Cegep de la Gaspesie et des Iles in Gaspe
- Cégep de Sept-Îles in Sept-Îles, Quebec

== English-language universities ==
- McGill University in Montreal
- Concordia University in Montreal
- Bishop's University in Lennoxville

== Post-secondary education ==
- Canadian European Academy on West Island of Montreal
