= Champlain Regional College =

College in Quebec, Canada

- Type: College
- Established: April 7, 1971
- Affiliations: CICan, CCAA, QSSF
- Director: Dr. Odette Côté
- Acting Director of Studies: Paul Kaeser
- Academic staff: 463 faculty (Fall 2014, all 3 campuses combined)
- Administrative staff: 38 management, 37 professionals, 100 support staff (Fall 2014, at all 3 campuses combined with College Administration)
- Students: 5,026 Regular Day, 249 Continuing Education (Fall 2014 - at all 3 campuses combined)
- Location: Sherbrooke, Quebec, Canada
- Campus Locations: Lennoxville, Saint-Lambert, Quebec City
- Website: www.crc-sher.qc.ca
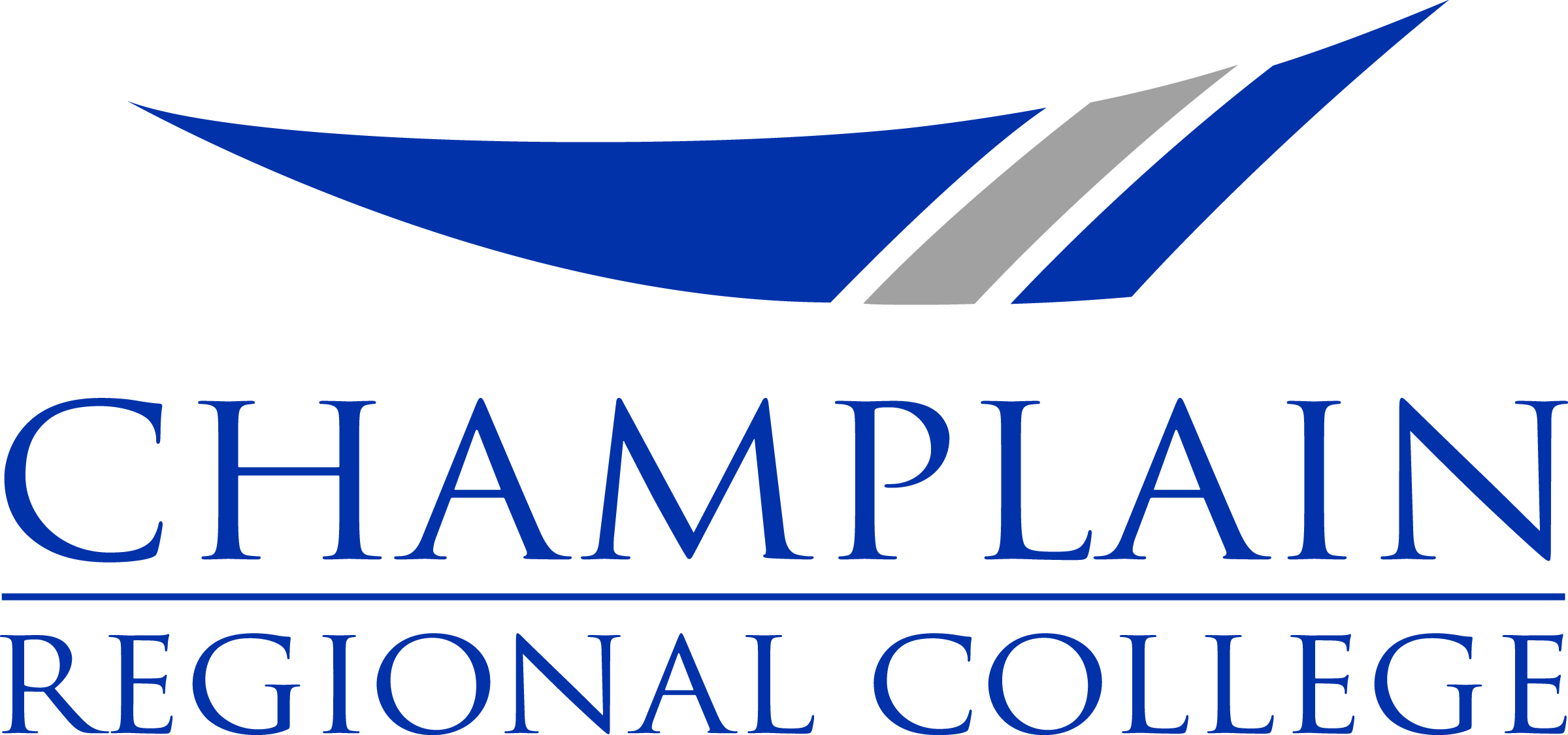
- Brandmark and crest images © Champlain Regional College

Champlain Regional College is an English-language Collège d'enseignement général et professionnel (CEGEP) with campuses located in three distinct administrative regions of Quebec: Lennoxville, Saint-Lambert, and Quebec City. The college offers post-secondary pre-university and technical DEC diploma programs as well as vocational AEC certificate programs.

== History ==
The college was founded in 1971 and named in honour of Samuel de Champlain, the first governor of New France. It traces its origins to the merger of several educational institutions which became public in 1967 with the creation of Quebec's CEGEPs and the collegiate system.

== Organization and administration ==
Champlain Regional College (CRC) is composed of an Administrative Office located in Sherbrooke, Quebec, and three campuses located in different regions of the province: Champlain College Lennoxville, in the Estrie; Champlain College Saint-Lambert, in the Montérégie; and Champlain College St. Lawrence, in the Capitale-Nationale area. Despite having "Regional" in its name, CRC is not a regional college as defined by Quebec's General and Vocational Colleges Act. The only regional college under the Act is the Cégep régional de Lanaudière, which has a much more decentralized structure. This more decentralized structure has been proposed to the Board of Governors by administrators as a possible new organizational model for the college, but it was rejected as unworkable for CRC, in part due to the distances between the campuses.

The Director General and Director of Studies are based at the Sherbrooke Administrative offices along with the Director of Financial Services, the Director of Material Resources, Director of Human Resources and Secretary General, Coordinator of Information Technology, and their respective staff teams. All teaching and direct services to students are offered on the three campuses only.

The college is overseen by a Board of Governors with representation divided over the regions, following the usual structure except that CRC has one more faculty member on the Board than other public colleges, to ensure faculty representation from each campus and to account for the campuses' isolation from each other. Many members of the college community complain that their regions are underrepresented on the board, because its membership is divided between the four locations, giving the Estrie region approximately half of the board members. The 16-member Commission of Studies is also composed of Sherbrooke administrators plus faculty, staff and students from each teaching location.

Each campus is overseen by a Campus Director under the authority of the Director General. Each campus has administrators in charge of local management of human resources, finances, buildings and grounds, information technology, student services, registrar's office, and continuing education, all under the Campus Director's authority but also answerable to Administrators in Sherbrooke. Occasional issues arise due to this doubling of administrative services between Sherbrooke and the Campuses.

== Campuses ==
CRC has three teaching locations:

=== Champlain College Saint-Lambert ===
The St. Lambert campus is located 148 kilometres from the College's Head Office, on the South Shore of Montreal Island in the Montérégie town of Saint-Lambert. It offers pre-university and technical DEC programs, as well as AEC programs and an extensive range of other continuing education services (including Recognition of Acquired Competencies or RAC) both on and off campus.

=== Champlain College Lennoxville ===
The Lennoxville campus is located only seven kilometres from head office in the Estrie region, in the Sherbrooke borough of Lennoxville, where it shares grounds and facilities with Bishop's University. It offers pre-university and technical DEC programs on its main campus as well as AEC programs and other continuing education services at a separate location.

=== Champlain College St. Lawrence ===
The St. Lawrence campus is located 227 kilometres from the Sherbrooke office in Capitale-Nationale region, in the Québec City borough of Ste-Foy. Originally an independent Classical College affiliated with Université Laval, this campus offers primarily pre-university DEC programs, one technical DEC program, and one AEC program. It is the only fully-English Cégep in Eastern Québec.

The college administrative offices are located apart from the teaching locations in the city of Sherbrooke.

The regional and cultural differences between the campuses have led to a debate over the value of the multi-regional structure of the college. Many members of the college community argue this structure limits campuses' ability to respond as well as they might to their students' and local communities' needs, while others argue that regional diversity creates opportunities for "synergy" across multiple regions of Quebec, even though there is little interaction between the campuses due to the vast distances between them. Some contact is facilitated by participation in college-wide bodies such as the Commission of Studies.

== Distinct culture and traditions ==
In part due to regional disparity and distances, each campus has, over time, developed its own distinct culture and traditions. Contributing to this is also the fact that union contracts apply to the individual campuses rather than to the college as a whole, meaning that each location has its own separate teaching, professional and support staff unions, with little chance for job mobility between locations. Meetings of college-wide bodies are often held in rented space in the city of Drummondville, which is more or less equidistant from each of the three campuses and the Sherbrooke administrative offices. Communication between the campuses is rare below the management level.

== Controversy over the Regional Structure ==
Since early 2014, a movement has re-emerged among the faculty and staff of Champlain College, in favour of creating three colleges from the campuses and eliminating the Sherbrooke administration office, which they consider distant from educational realities on the campuses and detrimental to the campuses' success. This movement first appeared in the 1990s. The more recent version began at the St-Lawrence Campus, which had been an independent institution prior to the formation of CRC. There, all three unions (faculty, support staff and professionals) have been working together since early in 2014 to make their campus an independent college.

In separate General Assemblies in the Fall of 2014, the faculty union of the St-Lambert Campus took a position in favour of St-Lawrence independence, and subsequently voted to support independence for St-Lambert. In December 2014, the Fédération Nationale des Enseignantes et Enseignants du Québec (Quebec Teachers' Federation, or FNEEQ) passed a unanimous motion at its Federal Council supporting the move for campus independence. Support Staff at Champlain St-Lambert also voted to seek independence for their campus in March, 2015. This was followed in March, 2016 by unanimous support from the provincial Fédération des Employées et Employés du Secteur Publique (FEESP: Public Sector Employees Federation), Cégep sector.

In February 2015, a campaign to promote the St-Lawrence Campus' independence was officially launched with support from FNEEQ, a supporting web page, and student-created video. Teachers from St-Lambert campus traveled to Quebec City to attend the launch, stating their hope that this would also lead to independence for their own campus. A formal petition was sponsored at the Québec National Assembly by the Official Opposition Critic for Higher Education, Véronique Hivon (Parti-Québécois). The St-Lambert staff and faculty took a table and presented a petition during the "St-Lambert Days" street festival that summer. In April, the teachers' union at the Lennoxville campus passed a General Assembly motion supporting their colleagues' push for independence at the other two campuses.

College administrators officially oppose this movement, and say they consider it a matter of "deep concern." Nevertheless, after the Director of Studies resigned in November, 2014 to take a position at another college, campus autonomy arose several times at the Board of Governors due to the observed difficulty of fulfilling the role of Director of Studies in a multi-regional structure. During most of the following year, the Board of Governors unsuccessfully explored a variety of ideas for improving the structure of the academic leadership of the college while maintaining the institutional structure, and hired an outside consultant to specifically examine the Director of Studies role. The consultant's report stated that under the current structure "[there] is no value-added brought by the Director of Studies... . This person is in charge of all the important dossiers and yet, does not control anything." The consultant recommended that pedagogical leadership should become much more decentralized, with a separate Director of Studies for each campus, because this would provide leadership that is currently lacking according to the report, create less confusion, and make the college more responsive to students' needs. Despite this, in a series of votes over several subsequent meetings, the Board opted instead to maintain the status quo.

At its June meeting in 2015, the Board voted 10 to 4 to reaffirm the current multi-regional structure. Notwithstanding this, at the following Board meeting, the Director General and acting director of Studies moved and seconded a resolution calling for the Board to request a change to the structural model used by the Cégep Régional de Lanaudière, which is much more decentralized. They then both spoke and voted against their own motion, which was defeated, 7 to 4. The Board then suspended its review of the Director of Studies position and proceeded to work towards finding candidates for the vacant position while retaining the status quo structure.

The Campus independence movement continues to assert that the best change would be the elimination of the Central Administration in favour of creating three separate colleges, one per region. In April, 2016, the majority of college employees at St-Lambert and St-Lawrence campuses voted to cease participating at the Board of Governors until the college's institutional problems were resolved. In November 2016, several hundred people attended a rally supporting independence for the campuses, while in December 2016 the college reiterated its support for the current structure.

The college returned to this issue in Spring, 2017, when the Sherbrooke office began further centralizing control of campus affairs by having certain managers report directly to Sherbrooke rather than to the local campus authorities. This began at the Saint-Lawrence campus, where it was extremely controversial. The proposal was then presented to the Board of Governors for its approbation, and after an in-camera meeting in late June 2017, at which representatives of each employee group were invited to speak to the question, the college announced in a letter to all employees that it was withdrawing this centralization plan.

In August 2017, David Birnbaum, MNA for the Montreal riding of Darcy-Mcgee, prepared a report at the request of the Minister of Higher Education. This report, while putting aside the idea of independent status for the three campuses, nonetheless recommended that the college be greatly decentralized in a number of ways, particularly with regard to academic leadership. In response to this, the campus unions returned representatives to the Board, which committed itself to studying and implementing the "Birnbaum Report."

== See also ==
English-language Colleges:

- Champlain
  - Champlain College Lennoxville
  - Champlain College Saint-Lambert
  - Champlain College St. Lawrence
- Dawson College
- Heritage
- John Abbott College
- Marianopolis College
- Vanier College
- TAV College
- List of colleges in Quebec
- Higher education in Quebec
