= Marianopolis College =

Private English-language college in Quebec

- Collège Marianopolis (French)
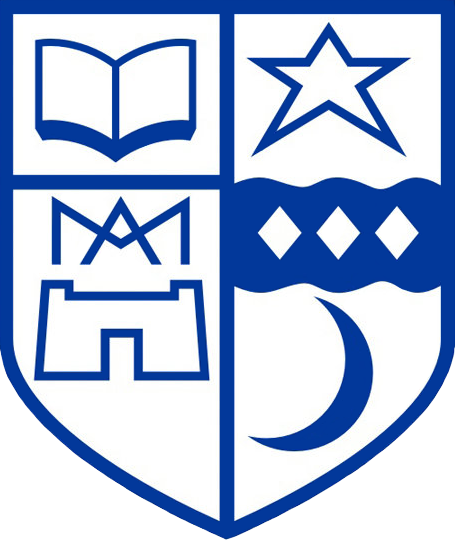
- Motto: Latin: Auspice Maria
- Motto in English: "Under the Guidance of Mary"
- Type: Private college
- Established: 1908
- Affiliations: Association des collèges privés du Québec, CUSID, ACCC, CCAA
- Provost: Eric Lozowy
- Director: Mr. Christian Corno
- Students: 2,100
- Location: 4873 Westmount Avenue, Westmount, Quebec, H3Y 1X9, Canada; 45°28′52″N 73°36′42″W
- Language: English
- Colors: Blue
- Nickname: Demons
- Mascot: Blue Demon
- Website: www.marianopolis.edu

Marianopolis College is a private English-language college in the Canadian province of Quebec. Located in Westmount, Quebec, it is an anglophone college with a student body over 2,000. The General and Vocational Education College, known as a CEGEP, is affiliated with the Association des collèges privés du Québec (ACPQ), Association of Canadian Community Colleges (ACCC) and Canadian Colleges Athletic Association (CCAA).

== Campus ==
The college's current site is at 4873 Westmount Ave in Westmount, between Vendôme and Villa-Maria metro stations.

Prior to April 2007, it was situated at 3880 Côte-des-Neiges.

== Programs ==
The college offers pre-university programs, which take two years to complete and cover the subject matters which roughly correspond to the additional year of high school given elsewhere in Canada and introductory first-year university curriculum in preparation for a chosen field in university. Accordingly, graduates may, in certain circumstances, receive advance credit of up to one full year in some disciplines when enrolling in universities outside the province of Quebec.

While the college primarily offers two-year pre-university programs leading to a Diploma of Collegial Studies (DEC), several three-year double-DEC programs are also available. These programs allow students to combine music with Science, Social Science or Arts.

== History ==
The school inception can be traced back to Marguerite Bourgeoys, the founder of the Notre-Dame Congregation and founder of the first school in New France in 1658.

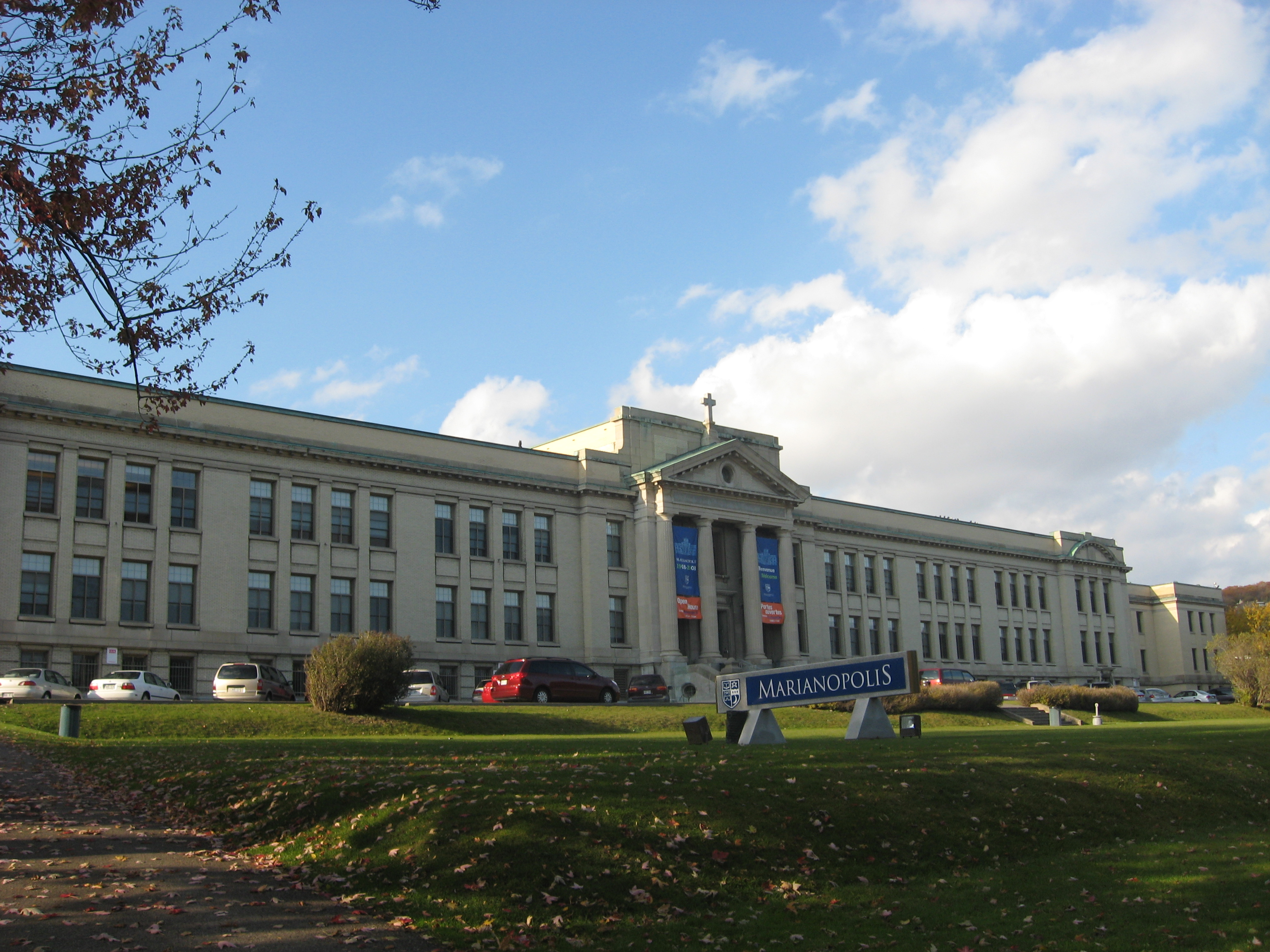
Marianopolis College at new location

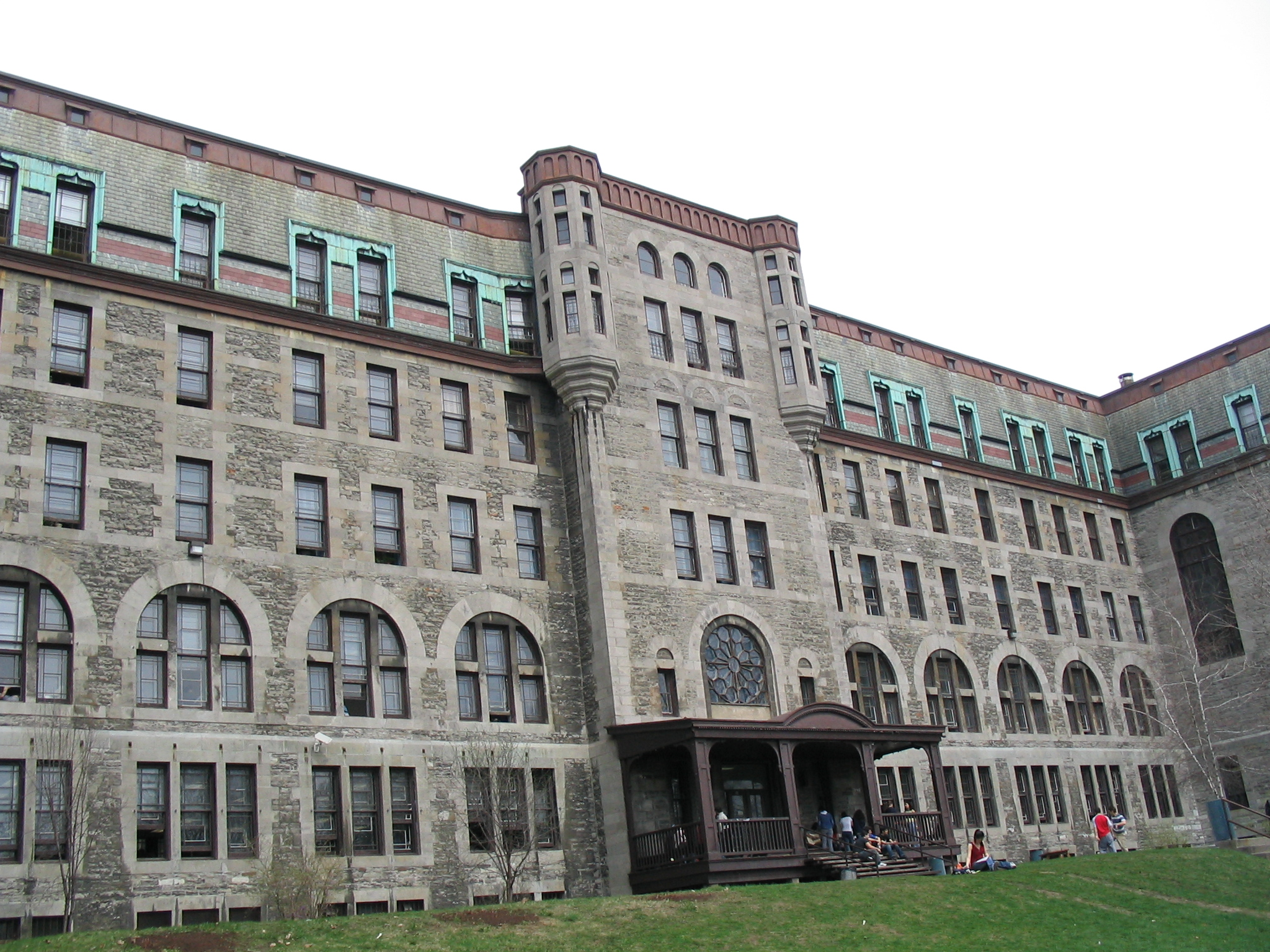
Marianopolis College at its previous Côte-des-Neiges location, prior to fall 2007

The school was founded in 1908 as the bilingual Notre Dame Ladies College, the first institution of higher learning for English-speaking Catholic women in Quebec. Initially, it offered degrees through Université Laval, the first being offered three years after the college's founding. The degree-granting agreement was later transferred to Université de Montréal. In 1926, the school was renamed Marguerite Bourgeoys College.

During the World War II era, the English sector of the college was reorganized to be in line with anglophone universities, including programs in general science and honours chemistry. It changed its name to Marianopolis College (from Greek City of Maria) (since the teaching congregation has another much older nearby secondary school named Villa Maria [1854]).

In 1967, several institutions were merged and became public ones, when the Quebec system of colleges was created. Changes to the education system in Quebec caused Marianopolis to adopt a college-level program in 1969. The college also began accepting male students during this time. The university degree-granting program was eventually phased out in 1972.

For 30 years, Marianopolis was located near McGill University at 3647 rue Peel, where it had moved in 1945 from a previous building that was destroyed by fire. In 1975, the college relocated to a larger campus on the site of the former Sulpician school Séminaire de Philosophie, at 3880 Côte des Neiges. In 2007, Marianopolis returned to its original campus in the prestigious historic building at 4873 Westmount Av., designed by J.O. Marchand, a prominent Quebec architect of his time and creator of such architecturally significant buildings as the old Municipal Courthouse and the Peace Tower of the Parliament of Canada. The building was built first for the Institut pédagogique, a superior normal school to train female teachers and after as the mother house of the Congregation before returning to academic use. The campus’ facilities were modernized and a double gymnasium was built underground. In 2017, the College undertook the largest renovation project in its history to equip its near-century-old building with modern safety features, heating, ventilation, and air-conditioning, while upgrading teaching, learning and working spaces across campus.

Although the college remains under the authority of the Congregation of Notre-Dame, students of all faiths are admitted and the curriculum and school experience are entirely secular.

== Campus life and environment ==
=== Congress and clubs ===
The student life at Marianopolis is supported by MSU (Marianopolis Student Union) Congress, the student government. Congress consists of a President and a Vice-President of Administrative Affairs, as well as a Vice-President of Finance and ten other coordinators, each one focusing on a specific domain. The President, Vice-President and six other members of Congress are elected by the student body at Marianopolis College; the remaining five positions are appointed. Many major events and activities regarding the ensemble of the students are organized by Congress, such events include Halloween celebrations, health week, Valentine's Day activities, and so forth.

Students may freely create their own club to practice hobbies with other fellow students or to simply attract people of similar interests together. Currently, there are approximately 100 clubs within the college ranging from dance clubs to Computer science club to Tea club. These clubs coordinate activities and meetings between members and some also benefit from Congress' monetary financing.

=== Athletics ===
The Marianopolis College athletes go by the name of the Demons. They are involved in multiple competitive sports such as volleyball, basketball, and rugby. These teams play within the RSEQ sports league.

Some student clubs also practice various other sports such as rowing, dragon boat, skiing, and tennis.

The fitness center and gymnasium are open to students during certain hours during the week for them to work out.

== Academic programs ==
Each Marianopolis student is required to complete a set of general courses in addition to those required by the program into which they have been admitted.

=== Academic programs ===
- Sciences
  - Health Science
  - Pure & Applied Science
- Arts and Sciences
- Social Science & Commerce
  - Core Social Science
  - Law, Society, and Justice
  - Human Behaviour (Psychology)
  - Commerce
  - Social Science with Math
- Arts, Literature and Communication
- Liberal Arts
- Music & Music Double-DECs
  - Music/Science
  - Music/Social Science
  - Music/Arts, Literature and Communication

=== Academic certificates ===
Additionally, there are various certificate programs, which interested students need to apply for once admitted to Marianopolis. These are considered honours programs and require additional co-curricular work such as a thesis or research project, and/or that certain classes be taken. The current certificate programs include:

- Honours Commerce
- Honours Social Science
- Honours Science
- International Studies Certificate
- Law and Social Justice
- Third World Studies Certificate
- Environmental Studies Certificate
- Native Studies Certificate
- Gender Studies Certificate

== Alumni ==
Notable Marianopolis alumni include:

- Juanita Westmoreland-Traoré, OQ '63, Canada's first black law school dean
- Nicole Duval Hesler '64, Quebec's first female Chief Justice
- Nicholas Kasirer '78, Justice of the Supreme Court of Canada
- Corey Hart '79, singer of the hit single "Sunglasses at Night"
- Monique Polak '79, Young Adult fiction writer
- Colin McGregor '81, infamous crossbow murderer in 1991
- Christine Jones '85, Tony award-winning scenic designer
- Victoria Kaspi '86, First woman to win Herzberg Medal (2016)
- Greg Fergus '88, Speaker of the House of Commons
- Sean Devine '89, actor, playwright, and politician
- Sugar Sammy '95, comedian
- Mylène Dinh-Robic '97, actress, voice-over artist
- Erdem Moralıoğlu '97, fashion designer
- Kaya Fraser '99, singer-songwriter
- Ariel Helwani '01, MMA journalist
- Antoni Porowski '03, television personality, Queer Eye
- Nicholas Johnson '16, first black valedictorian of Princeton University, attended for one year

== See also ==
- List of colleges in Quebec
- Higher education in Quebec
- English-language colleges
  - Champlain
  - Dawson College
  - Heritage
  - John Abbott College
  - Vanier College
  - TAV College
