= Champlain College Saint-Lambert =

Public college in Saint-Lambert, Quebec

- Type: College
- Established: September, 1972
- Parent institution: Champlain Regional College
- Academic affiliations: ACCC, AUCC
- Director: Don Shewan
- Students: 2,800
- Campus: Suburban
- Colours: Blue, black
- Nickname: Cavaliers
- Sporting affiliations: CCAA, Réseau du sport étudiant du Québec RSEQ]
- Website: champlainsaintlambert.ca

Champlain College Saint-Lambert (French: Collège Champlain Saint-Lambert) is an English-language college in Saint-Lambert, Quebec, Canada that is part of Quebec's CEGEP public education system. It is a constituent college of Champlain Regional College, and primarily serves the South Shore of Montreal. The English-language public post-secondary institution offers both pre-university and career programs.

== History ==
Champlain College was established shortly after the Quebec Government passed the General and Vocational Act in 1967. This Act is better known for the creation of a distinct college level, the CEGEP, between high-school and university. Later in 1969, English public colleges were inaugurated. Champlain Regional College was recognized on April 7, 1971. The school is named after the famous explorer, Samuel de Champlain. The Champlain Colleges are set out to serve English speakers in Quebec City (Champlain St-Lawrence), Eastern Townships (Champlain Lennoxville) and South Shore of Montreal areas (Champlain Saint-Lambert). Champlain College Saint-Lambert is the biggest institution out of the three campuses; it is home to approximately 2,800 students. The official inauguration of the St-Lambert college grounds was held on October 23, 1976.

Champlain Saint-Lambert celebrated its 50th anniversary as an institution in the academic year 2022–23. The event was marked with the inauguration of a custom art piece and a student time capsule.

== Programs ==
The college offers two types of programs: pre-university and career. The pre-university programs, which take two years to complete, cover the subject matters which roughly correspond to the additional year of high school given elsewhere in Canada in preparation for a chosen field in university. The career programs, which take three-years to complete, applies to students who wish to pursue a skill trade.

In addition, the college offers over a dozen Continuing Education programs for adult students, including the largest RAC (Recognition of Acquired Competencies) service of any English Cegep in the province. The Business and Industry services provides non-credit training to individuals and businesses through corporate training.

=== Pre-University Programs ===
- Science Program — Pure & Applied Sciences Option
- Science Program — Computer Science and Mathematics
- Science Program — Health Sciences Option
- Social Science — General Option
- Social Science — Commerce Option
- Social Science — Education Option
- Social Science — Criminology Option
- Social Science — Psychology Option
- Social Science — International Studies Option
- Creative Arts, Languages & Literature — Digital Arts & New Media, Film & New Media
- Creative Arts, Languages & Literature — Language & Culture
- Law and Civilization and Law, Civilization and Mathematics

=== Career Programs ===
- Entrepreneurship (Business Management)
- Sport Marketing & Management Option (Business Management)
- Computer Science Technology
- Nursing

== Extracurricular activities ==
In the 2010s, teams of students represented the college in the Tournoi Jeunes Démocrates, organized in and by the National Assembly of Quebec. The Champlain College St. Lawrence team won the gold medal in the 2001 edition, and Champlain Saint-Lambert won gold in 2011. Since 2012, only Champlain Saint-Lambert teams have participated in the tournament.

In 2020, Champlain students created the Indigenous Student Ambassador program to create space on campus for Indigenous students to access peer-support, organize awareness events, and share experiences with faculty during professional development training. In 2022, the college hired a full-time Indigenous Student Life Counsellor to support the ISA program and Indigenous students.

Champlain Saint-Lambert's Model United Nations team attends conferences in the U.S. and in Canada and hosts an annual event on campus. In 2024, the Model UN team attended the prestigious conference held at Harvard University.

== Sports ==
Champlain College is represents in sports by their varsity team The Cavaliers. The Champlain Cavaliers Intercollegiate Program currently has 10 teams competing in 7 sports at different levels in the Réseau du sport étudiant du Québec (RSEQ). The Cavaliers currently field teams in Badminton, Basketball, Cross-Country Running, Flag Football, Football, Soccer, and Volleyball. With almost 10% of the student population competing at this level, the Cavaliers continue to compete at the highest levels. They have captured numerous regional and provincial championships since they started playing back in 1974.

Champlain College Saint-Lambert hosted their first CCAA National Championship in Men's Basketball in 2008. Since then, the college has played host to the 2012 CCAA Cross-Country Running Nationals and the 2014 CCAA Women's Basketball Nationals. Champlain Saint-Lambert hosted the 2023 RSEQ D1 Provincial Soccer Championships in October 2023 and the women's soccer team won gold in front of the home crowd. Champlain hosted the Women's provincial basketball finals in March 2024 and won gold on home court.

The Champlain Cavaliers have won numerous national championship medals including a national gold medal win by the women's soccer team in 2018, and national silver medals in women's cross-country running (2019) and women's soccer (2022). Both the men's and women's Champlain soccer teams took home national bronze medals in 2019 and the women's basketball team won bronze at the national championship in 2024, securing the first ever national medal for the women's basketball program.

== Controversy Over the Multi-Regional Structure ==
A movement has emerged over time among faculty and staff in favour of establishing Champlain Saint-Lambert as an independent Cégep and eliminating the Sherbrooke Central Administration offices. This movement also exists at the St-Lawrence campus. It has the official support of five of the six labour unions at the St-Lambert and St-Lawrence campuses, a large number of students, the CSN labour central, and the Fédération Nationale des enseignantes et enseignants du Québec (Quebec National Teachers Federation or FNEEQ). It first developed in the 1990s but resurfaced in 2014 and has caused significant debate at the Board of Governors. The administration in Sherbrooke both expresses concern over this movement and disparages it, with the chair of the Board of Governors publicly calling it "childish".

== Notable alumni ==
- Brian Topp
- Gabriel Gervais
- Amy Walsh
- Alexandra Mendes
- Jamie Orchard

== See also ==
- List of colleges in Quebec
- Higher education in Quebec
