= Collège Jean-de-Brébeuf =

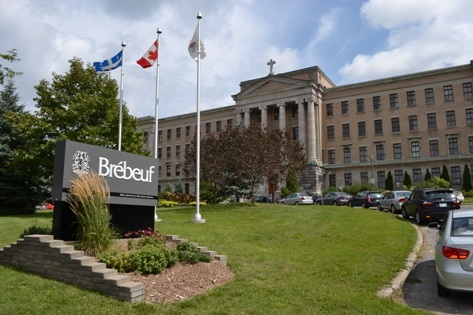
- Main entrance

Location
- 3200, chemin de la Côte-Sainte-Catherine; Montreal, Quebec, H3T 1C1; Canada; 45°30′04″N 73°37′24″W

Information
- Type: Private secondary school and Collegiate
- Motto: Latin: Viam Veritatis Elegi (I chose the path of truth)
- Religious affiliation: Non-denominational
- Established: 1928; 98 years ago
- Dean: Jacques Lemaire
- Director General: Luc Thifault
- Enrollment: approx. 1 700 (2022)
- Language: French
- Colours: Burgundy; Beige
- Nickname: Dynamiques
- Tuition: CA$5,884 (secondary school, base tuition)
- Affiliations: ACCC, CCAA, QSSF, AUCC
- Website: www.brebeuf.qc.ca

Collège Jean-de-Brébeuf (French: [kɔlɛʒ ʒɑ̃ də bʁebœf]) is a private, coeducational, French-language educational institution located on Côte-Sainte-Catherine Road in Montreal, in Quebec, Canada, offering secondary school and college-level education. Founded in 1928 by the Jesuits, it is currently a non-denominational school and also provides optional boarding facilities for students who wish to reside at the college. As of 2022, the school had approximately 1 700 pupils enrolled.

With alumni Pierre Trudeau and Justin Trudeau, Collège Jean-de-Brébeuf is the secondary education institution that has produced the most Canadian prime ministers in the country.

== History ==
The school building seen in the past

Collège Jean-de-Brébeuf was founded by the Jesuits in 1928, with the campus designed by Dalbé Viau and Alphonse Venne. The college was named after Catholic missionary and martyr Jean de Brébeuf. It became partially coeducational in 1968 and has been fully coeducational since 2014 when it began accepting girls for secondary 1 to 5 because of a need of funding. However, boys' and girls' classes take place in separate parts of the college before secondary 5. The school has been secular since 1986.

On May 4, 2016, a college student celebration on campus became rowdy: smoke bombs were thrown in hallways and classroom windows were broken.

== Curriculum ==
=== Secondary ===
Subjects taught in the secondary part of the school include Mathematics, French, English, Ethics and religious culture, Gym, Art, Sciences, Geography and History. From secondary 1 to 4, three separate programs are offered to students: additional Sports, Latin, and Spanish. In secondary 5, in addition to the common core courses (i.e., the compulsory courses that all secondary 5 students must take), students choose from a combination of two optional courses: either physics and chemistry (the science combination) or modern European history and 20th century history (the history combination)

The secondary school curriculum has strong ties to the cours classique, the long-standing education system that was used in Quebec prior to the creation of the current system in the mid-1960s. Most notably, the study of Latin and the emphasis on logic and rhetoric still present in Brébeuf's curriculum are evidence of these ties. The collegiate philosophy classes also root themselves in the cours classique.

=== College ===
Collège Jean-de-Brébeuf offers a number of two-year pre-university programs (unlike public colleges, it does not offer technical programs, which typically take around three years to complete and lead directly to certification for a specific trade or profession).

Post-secondary students attending Collège Jean-de-Brébeuf can choose one of several programs of study, depending on the concentrations required for the university program in which they intend to pursue their studies. The college offers programs in Social Science, Literature & Communications, Health Science, Pure and Applied Science and Arts & Sciences.

In addition to the standard Diploma of College Studies, students in certain programs are also awarded a Sciences, Lettres et Arts (FR) diploma (all-rounded preparatory for all university majors except music and dance, known as Arts and Science in English-language colleges).

It is also possible for students who practice a musical instrument at a high level to pursue their collegiate studies at Brébeuf in either Social Science, Pure and Applied Science, Health Science or Literature and Communication while simultaneously completing a DEC in Music by using a "musique-études" formula with the École de musique Vincent-d'Indy. This college track is called Double DEC and takes an additional year to complete, making it possible to attend Collège Jean-de-Brébeuf for 8 years.

== Sports and extracurricular activities ==
The school is known for being very competitive in basketball, lacrosse, soccer and fencing, having won provincial titles in basketball and soccer several times.

=== Soccer ===
The last successful Cup run for the Varsity Intercollegiate Soccer Team tracks back to 2023, with a dramatic win in a Penalty Shootout against historic rivals Collège André-Grasset.

=== Other sports ===
The school also competes at provincial and regional level hockey, volleyball, cheerleading, broomball, cross country running, badminton and rugby competitions. The school's lacrosse team has been in the finals for the four years it has played and has won the title three consecutive years.

=== Other activities ===
The college has many extracurricular clubs including Ancient Greek, Debate, Rhetoric and Law and Theatre.

== Notable alumni ==
=== Sport ===
- Georges Laraque: former ice hocker player for Montreal Canadiens (did not graduate)
- Shaul Gordon, fencer
- Marc-Antoine Blais Bélanger, fencer
- François Cauchon, fencer
- Joseph Polossifakis, fencer

=== Arts and media ===
- François Arnaud: actor
- Gregory Charles: musician, actor and entertainer
- Régine Chassagne: Arcade Fire's founding member
- Chuck Comeau: Simple Plan's drummer
- Hector de Saint-Denys Garneau: poet
- Pierre Nadeau: Radio-Canada journalist, television presenter and producer
- Norimitsu Onishi: New York Times journalist and Pulitzer Prize finalist.
- Alexandre Trudeau: Canadian filmmaker and journalist; son of Pierre Elliott Trudeau
- Jacques Godbout: writer and filmmaker
- Julie Snyder: recognized TV host: Le Banquier and Star Académie, a singing competition
- Philippe Lesage: filmmaker
- Béatrice Martin (aka Coeur de Pirate): singer-songwriter
- Christiane Duchesne: researcher, educator, illustrator, translator and writer
- André Pratte: journalist, editor-in-chef of La Presse
- Denise Ho: cantopop singer
- William Johnson: journalist, president of Alliance Quebec
- Patrice Roy : Radio-Canada news presenter

=== Politics and Law ===
- Justin Trudeau: 23rd Prime Minister of Canada
- Pierre Elliott Trudeau: 15th Prime Minister of Canada; father of Justin Trudeau
- Marc-André Blanchard: lawyer and diplomat
- André Boisclair: politician, former leader of the Parti Québécois
- Robert Bourassa: former Premier of Quebec
- Pierre Bourgault: politician, intellectual, teacher and columnist
- Michelle Courchesne: politician, Deputy Premier of Quebec
- Clément Gascon: Supreme Court justice
- Paul Gérin-Lajoie: lawyer and politician
- Richard Wagner: Chief Justice of the Supreme Court
- Pierre-Marc Johnson: former Premier of Quebec
- Denis Lazure: politician, psychiatrist
- Marc Miller: lawyer and politician
- Claude Jodoin: first president of the Canadian Labour Congress

=== Business ===
- Pierre Boivin: President of the Montreal Canadiens of the National Hockey League
- Jean Carle: civil servant and executive
- Jean Coutu: Jean Coutu Group's founder
- Pierre Péladeau: Quebecor's founder
- Michel Vennat: Business Development Bank of Canada's president and CEO
- A. Jean de Grandpré : business executive, 15th chancellor of McGill University
- Pierre Karl Péladeau: former leader of the Parti Québécois, former CEO of Quebecor Inc.
- Hubert Lacroix: CBC Radio-Canada President and CEO

=== Other ===
- Pascal Charbonneau: Grandmaster, former Canadian Chess Champion
- Michel Chartrand: union leader, activist
- Monique Desroches: ethnomusicologist
- Jacques Ferron: physician, author and politician
- Michel Trudeau: (October 2, 1975 – November 13, 1998); son of Pierre Elliott Trudeau
- Hubert Reeves: astrophysicist
- Michel Sabourin: psychologist
- Amélie Saintonge, astrophysicist
- Jacques Hurtubise: mathematician

== See also ==
- List of colleges in Quebec
- Higher education in Quebec
