= List of colleges in Quebec =

This is a list of colleges in Quebec, sorted by type.

== Public colleges ==
=== Abitibi-Témiscamingue ===
- Cégep de l'Abitibi-Témiscamingue, Rouyn-Noranda

=== Bas-Saint-Laurent ===
- Cégep de La Pocatière, La Pocatière
- Cégep de Rimouski, Rimouski
- Cégep de Rivière-du-Loup, Rivière-du-Loup

=== Capitale-Nationale ===
- Cégep Garneau, La Cité, Quebec City
- Cégep Limoilou, Limoilou, Quebec City
- Cégep de Sainte-Foy, Sainte-Foy, Quebec City

=== Centre-du-Québec ===
- Cégep de Drummondville, Drummondville
- Cégep de Victoriaville, Victoriaville
- Kiuna Institute

=== Chaudière-Appalaches ===
- Cégep Beauce-Appalaches, Saint-Georges
- Cégep de Lévis, Lévis
- Cégep de Thetford, Thetford Mines

=== Côte-Nord ===
- Cégep de Baie-Comeau, Baie-Comeau
- Cégep de Sept-Îles, Sept-Îles

=== Estrie ===
- Cégep de Granby-Haute-Yamaska, Granby
- Cégep de Sherbrooke, 2^{e} arrondissement, Sherbrooke

=== Gaspésie–Îles-de-la-Madeleine ===
- Cégep de la Gaspésie et des Îles, Gaspé
- Cégep de Matane, Matane

=== Lanaudière ===
- Cégep régional de Lanaudière
  - Joliette Campus, Joliette
  - L'Assomption Campus, L'Assomption
  - Terrebonne Campus, Terrebonne

=== Laurentides ===
- Collège Lionel-Groulx, Sainte-Thérèse
- Cégep de Saint-Jérôme, Saint-Jérôme

=== Laval ===
- Collège Montmorency, Laval

=== Mauricie ===
- Collège Shawinigan, Shawinigan
- Cégep de Trois-Rivières, Trois-Rivières

=== Montérégie ===
- Cégep Édouard-Montpetit, Vieux-Longueuil, Longueuil
  - École nationale d'aérotechnique
- Cégep de Saint-Hyacinthe, Saint-Hyacinthe
- Cégep de Saint-Jean-sur-Richelieu, Saint-Jean-sur-Richelieu
- Cégep de Sorel-Tracy, Sorel-Tracy
- Collège de Valleyfield, Salaberry-de-Valleyfield

=== Montréal ===
- Collège Ahuntsic, Ahuntsic, Montreal
- Cégep André-Laurendeau, LaSalle, Montreal
- Collège de Bois-de-Boulogne, Cartierville, Montreal
- Dawson College, Westmount, Montreal
- Collège Gérald-Godin, Sainte-Geneviève, Montreal
- John Abbott College, Sainte-Anne-de-Bellevue, Montreal
- Collège de Maisonneuve, Hochelaga-Maisonneuve, Montreal
- Cégep Marie-Victorin, Rivière-des-Prairies, Montreal
- Collège de Rosemont, Rosemont, Montreal
- Cégep de Saint-Laurent, Saint-Laurent, Montreal
- Vanier College, Saint-Laurent, Montreal
- Cégep du Vieux Montréal, Ville-Marie (Quartier Latin), Montreal

=== Outaouais ===
- Heritage College, Hull, Gatineau
- Cégep de l'Outaouais, Hull, Gatineau

=== Saguenay–Lac-Saint-Jean ===
- Collège d'Alma, Alma
- Cégep de Chicoutimi, Chicoutimi, Saguenay
- Cégep de Jonquière, Jonquière, Saguenay
- Cégep de Saint-Félicien, Saint-Félicien

=== Others ===
- Champlain Regional College
  - Saint Lambert Campus, Saint-Lambert, Longueuil
  - Saint Lawrence Campus, Sainte-Foy, Quebec City
  - Lennoxville Campus, Lennoxville, Sherbrooke

== Private subsidized colleges ==
- TAV College (Montreal)
- Teccart Institut (Downtown, and Brossard)
- Campus Notre-Dame-de-Foy (Saint-Augustin-de-Desmaures)
- Collège André-Grasset, including the Institut Grasset, both located in (Montreal)
- Collège Bart (Quebec City)
- Centennial College (Montreal)
- Collège Jean-de-Brébeuf (Montreal)
- Collegial Sainte-Anne, related to the Collège Sainte-Anne de Lachine (Montreal)
- Collège Laflèche (Trois-Rivières)
- LaSalle College (Montreal)
- Marianopolis College (Montreal)
- Collège International Marie de France (Montreal)
- Collège Mérici (Quebec City)
- Collège International des Marcellines (Westmount)
- Conservatoire Lassalle (Montreal)
- O'Sullivan College of Montreal (Montreal)
- Collège O'Sullivan de Québec
- Herzing College (Montreal)
- Collège Universel - Campus Gatineau (Gatineau)
- Collège Supérieur de Montréal (Montréal)
- Collège Stanislas (Outremont)
- École de musique Vincent d'Indy (Outremont) (named after Vincent d'Indy)
- National Circus School (Montreal)
- Teccart Institute (Montreal), including its Longueuil and Brossard campuses
- Séminaire de Sherbrooke (Sherbrooke)
- École de sténographie judiciaire (Montreal)
- École du show-business (Montreal)
- Recording Arts Canada (Montreal)
- Trebas Institute (Montreal)
- Musitechnic services éducatifs (Montreal)

== Private colleges under licence ==
- College Avalon (Montreal)
- Académie de l'entrepreneurship Québécois (Saint-Hubert)
- Les Ateliers de danse moderne de Montréal (Montreal)
- Collège Marsan (Montreal)
- Canada College (Montreal)
- Collège April-Fortier (Montreal)
- Collège de l'Estrie (Sherbrooke)
- CDI College (Montreal), Laval, Longueuil, Pointe-Claire and Quebec City)
- Herzing College (Montreal)
- Collège de l'immobilier du Québec (Verdun)
- Inter-Dec College (Montreal)
- Collège Kensley (Montreal)
- Collège MultiHexa
- Collège La Cabriole (Saint-Jean-sur-Richelieu)
- Collège d'enseignement en immobilier (Montreal)
- Collège radio télévision de Québec (Quebec City)
- Collège Salette (Montreal)
- Montreal Technical College (Montreal)
- École de danse de Québec (Quebec City)
- École nationale de l'humour (Montreal)
- National Theatre School of Canada (Montreal)
- Institut supérieur d'informatique (Montreal)
- M College of Canada (Montreal)
- Matrix College of Management, Technology and Healthcare (Montreal)
- Montreal College of Information Technology (Montreal)
- Ultra College of Montreal (Montreal)

== Colleges part of the government network or belonging to a university ==
- Conservatoire de musique de Saguenay (Chicoutimi)
- Conservatoire de musique de Gatineau (Hull)
- Conservatoire de musique du Québec à Montréal (Montreal)
- Conservatoire de musique du Québec à Québec (Quebec City)
- Conservatoire de musique de Rimouski (Rimouski)
- Conservatoire de musique du Québec à Trois-Rivières (Trois-Rivières)
- Conservatoire de musique de Val-d'Or (Val-d'Or)
- Institut de technologie agroalimentaire
  - Campus La Pocatière (La Pocatière)
  - Campus Saint-Hyacinthe (Saint-Hyacinthe)
- Institut de tourisme et d'hôtellerie du Québec (Montreal)
- Macdonald College, run under McGill University (Sainte-Anne-de-Bellevue)
- Royal Military College Saint-Jean (Saint-Jean-sur-Richelieu)

== See also ==
- List of universities in Canada
- List of colleges in Canada
- List of business schools in Canada
- List of law schools in Canada
- List of Canadian universities by endowment
- Higher education in Canada
- Higher education in Quebec
- College education in Quebec
- CEGEP
- Education in Quebec
- Quebec
