= Champlain College St. Lawrence =

Public college in Quebec City, Quebec

Champlain Regional College, St. Lawrence Campus
- Motto: "We Open the World to You"
- Type: College
- Established: 1972
- Academic affiliations: ACCC, AUCC
- Dean: Gordon Brown
- Students: 1,024 (Fall 2010)
- Undergraduates: pre-university students; technical
- Location: 790, avenue Nérée Tremblay; Quebec City, Quebec; G1V 4K2; 46°47′13.38″N 71°16′51.84″W
- Campus: Urban
- Nickname: Lions
- Sporting affiliations: CCAA, QSSF
- Mascot: Lions
- Website: slc.qc.ca

Champlain Regional College, St. Lawrence Campus (French: Champlain Regional College, St. Lawrence Campus) is a campus belonging to Champlain Regional College. The campus is located in Quebec City, Quebec, Canada, and is the only English-language Cégep to serve the region.

== History ==
Champlain Regional College, St. Lawrence Campus was founded as a private boys' school in Sainte-Foy in 1958 by Cardinal Maurice Roy. As a classical college affiliated to Université Laval, St. Lawrence offered an eight-year programme - High School and College - leading to a Bachelor of Arts degree.

In 1965, St. Lawrence College became a coeducational institution when it accepted the students of the neighbouring Marymount College which was closing.

St. Lawrence has been located in various places during its evolution. In 1958, it started in the Grand Séminaire of Laval University; in 1964, it moved to its own facilities on Wolfe Avenue, which were sold to the Régionale de Tilly seven years later; then, in 1972, to the "old bowling alley" on Jean-Dequen; and finally, in 1977, to its present new facilities at 790 Nérée-Tremblay Avenue.

The college traces its origins to the merger of several institutions which became public ones in 1967, when the Quebec system of CEGEPs was created. As St. Lawrence changed its location, it also changed as an educational institution. After the Parent Report and the emergence of the present collegial system, the High School and B. A. programs were phased out, and St. Lawrence, now a CEGEP, was first affiliated with Cégep de Sainte-Foy and then, with Vanier College of Montreal. On July 1, 1972, St. Lawrence became a constituent of Champlain Regional College. In 2013, questions about the multi-regional structure and how it compares to other colleges led to structural analysis. There is now a movement to make St. Lawrence an autonomous CEGEP. A similar movement is taking place at St. Lambert College.

== Programmes ==
=== Pre-university programmes ===
Sciences

- Pure and Applied Science
- Health Science

Social Sciences

- Social Science (General)
- Psychology
- Commerce
- Mathematics

Creative Arts, Literature and Languages

- Spanish-French Stream
- German-French Stream
- Spanish-German Stream

=== Career programmes ===
- Accounting and Management Technology (PW Sims Business Programme)
- Tourism Technology

== Programmes ==
The CEGEP offers two types of programmes: pre-university and technical. The pre-university programmes, which take two years to complete, cover the subject matters which roughly correspond to the additional year of high school given elsewhere in Canada in preparation for a chosen field in university. The technical programmes, which take three-years to complete, applies to students who wish to pursue a skill trade.

== Athletics ==
The SLC Lions Athletics program exists since the early 1970s, where it became a member the FASCQ (Fédération des associations sportives collégiales du Québec).

Close to 200 athletes wear the colors of our teams on an annual basis. Our ten (10) varsity teams represent St. Lawrence at the regional and provincial levels as members of the Réseau du sport étudiant du Québec (RSEQ), and also at the national level as a member of the Canadian Collegiate Athletic Association (CCAA).

== See also ==
- List of colleges in Quebec
- Higher education in Quebec
