= Cégep de Saint-Félicien =

Public college in Saint-Félicien, Quebec

Coordinates: 48°38′55″N 72°27′24″W

- Type: public CEGEP
- Established: 1971
- Faculty: 210
- Students: 1200
- Undergraduates: pre-university students; technical
- Postgraduates: not available
- Location: Saint-Félicien, Quebec, Canada
- Website: http://www.cegepstfe.ca

The Cégep de Saint-Félicien is a CEGEP located at 1105 boulevard Hamel, Saint-Félicien, Quebec, Canada.

== History ==
The college traces its origins to the merger of several institutions which became public ones in 1967, when the Quebec system of CEGEPs was created. The college was founded in 1971.

== Programs ==
=== Technical Programs ===
- Processing of Forest Products
- First aid care
- Nature Technique
- Administration
- Information
- Tourism

=== Pre-University Programs ===
- Natural Science
- Human Science
- Arts and Letters
- Sciences, Letters and Arts

== See also ==
- List of colleges in Quebec
- Higher education in Quebec
