= R score =

Statistical method used in Quebec to classify college student performance

The R score (French: cote de rendement au collégial, CRC or cote R) is a statistical method that classifies college students' academic performances in Quebec. It is used by Quebec universities for selection purposes.

The R score is a z-score (Z_{col}) multiplied by a group dispersion indicator (IDGZ) to which an indicator of group strength (ISGZ) has been added.

$$\text{R score} = \bigl( (Z_\mathrm{col} \times \text{IDGZ} \bigr) + \text{ISGZ} + C) \times D$$

where C = D = 5.

The Z_{col} is the number of standard deviations of student above the class average and gives an indication of the grade of the student with respect to the grades of other students in the class. The ISGZ is the average high school Z-score (Z_{sec}) the group's students obtained on the MEES uniform examination subjects in Secondary 4 and 5. The IDGZ is the standard deviation of the students' Z_{sec} scores. The inclusion of the ISGZ and the IDGZ in the determination of the R score allows for a more equitable comparison between students, regardless of their CEGEP's academic rank but the effectiveness remains in dispute.

The use of the constant C = 5 greatly reduces the possibility of a negative value in the score and the multiplying the sum of all the preceding values by the constant D = 5 ensures the largeness of the score. The R score is defined such that the average is 25. Most R scores fall between 15 and 35, but any real number is a possible R score since the z-scores tend to positive or negative infinity as the standard deviation decreases. To guarantee that a grade of 100 produces an R score of at least 35, an adjusted Z score formula guaranteed to produce a result above 35 is used. Grades below 50 are not considered in calculating the average and the standard deviation of a grade distribution.

An R score is calculated for every course except for physical education taken before fall 2007 or for remedial courses. The final R score is the weighted average of the R score in all courses. In addition, failed courses are given a reduced weight in the overall R score and are weighted at 25% of the credits in the first semester and subsequently at 50%.

== History ==
In order to get more precise measurements of student's performances within a group in CEGEP, the R score was adopted in 1995 to replace the exclusive use of the Z-score. Failed courses have been given a reduced weight since October 2004. Physical education courses have been given an R score since fall 2007.

Up until 2017, the R score didn't include the IDGZ but used the ISG. The number 75 indicates the provincial average and the number 14 indicates its standard deviation in pourcentage.

$$\text{ISG} = \frac{[\text{avg. grade results of Secondary 4 and 5 of all students in group}] - 75}{14}$$

An additional score of 0.5 was also added to the overall R score of a student graduating with an International Baccalaureate degree or a DEC (Diplôme d'études collégiales) en Sciences, Lettres et Arts. The adjustment of the Z score using the IDGZ has made that unnecessary.

== Criticism ==
First-hand experience suggests that the R score is not as good of an indicator as it was meant to be. A recurring complaint from students is that the ISG does not seem to be enough to offset the advantage enjoyed by students in weak groups. Such students have the opportunity to obtain grades much higher than the low average of their class, thus earning an elevated Z score, but students in strong groups cannot earn such high Z scores. One possible reason for this is that the ISG for a certain course is based on the average of the grades in all high school courses, which may not correlate to the group's strength in that course as much as the average of the grades of similar courses in high school.

The perceived weaknesses of the R score are particularly worrying, because it is the main and sometimes the only criterion considered by Quebec universities during the admissions process. Since the R score is perceived as an absolute measure of a student's academic performance regardless of their academic rank, differences smaller than 0.5 are often used to discriminate between candidates applying to programs with fixed quotas such as medicine, pharmacy, dentistry, and law.

Overall, criticism has been received due to its complexity to students.
