= Collège Bart =

Private college in Quebec City, Quebec, Canada

Coordinates: 46°48′45″N 71°13′10″W

Information
- School type: Private college
- Established: 1917; 109 years ago
- Founder: Jean-Baptiste Bart
- Language: French
- Website: bart.ca

Collège Bart is a private college in Quebec City, Quebec, Canada. The school was founded in 1917 by Jean-Baptiste Bart, a teacher who emigrated from France. Bart's son Jean-Guy Bart became one of the leaders of the college. The current directors are Michel Bellerose and Johanne Renauld.
