= Collège Mérici =

- Type: Private
- Established: 1930
- Director: Vicky Roy
- Students: 1,100
- Address: 755 Grande Allée Ouest, Quebec, Quebec City, Quebec, Canada; 46°47′44″N 71°13′59″W
- Campus: 1
- Language: French/English
- Nickname: Les Panthères
- Website: https://www.merici.ca/

Collège Mérici (French pronunciation: [kɔlɛʒ meʁisi]) is a private college, the equivalent of a CEGEP, in Quebec City, Quebec, Canada. The college was founded in 1930, and was named in honour of Italian saint Angela Merici. The current director is Vicky Roy.
