= Champlain College Lennoxville =

Public college in Sherbrooke, Quebec

Coordinates: 45°19′10.80″N 71°50′42.58″W

- Type: College
- Established: 1972
- Parent institution: Champlain Regional College
- Affiliations: ACCC, CCAA, QSSF, AUCC,
- Students: 1,093 (Winter 2015)
- Location: Lennoxville, Quebec, Canada
- Campus: rural
- Sports teams: Champlain Cougars
- Colours: silver ; blue , black
- Website: www.crc-lennox.qc.ca

Champlain College Lennoxville is the Champlain Regional College campus serving the Eastern Townships (Estrie). The campus is located in the borough of Lennoxville, of Sherbrooke, Quebec, Canada. Like the other campuses of Champlain Regional College, the Lennoxville campus is an English-language public post-secondary institution.

Champlain College Lennoxville shares a campus with its neighbour, Bishop's University. In 2024 the college faced several accusations of psychological harassment and creating a toxic workplace from current and former employees.

== History ==
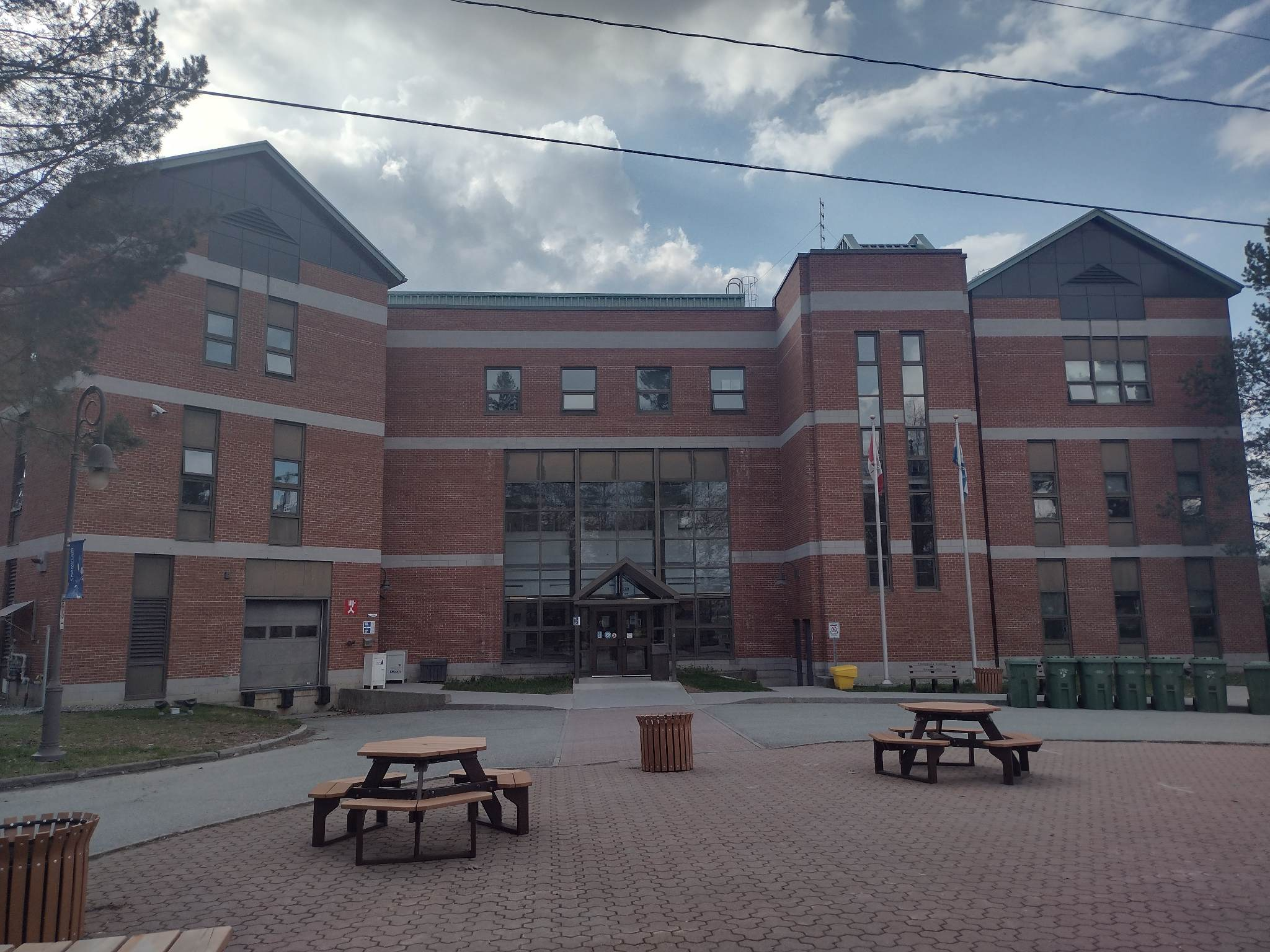
Champlain College Lennoxville

Champlain Regional College, the fourth English language college established in Quebec, was established on April 7, 1971. The college is named after Samuel de Champlain: seventeenth century explorer, fur trader, writer and far-sighted administrator of New France. With its three widely separated locations, Champlain was the first multi-regional college in the CEGEP network. Champlain Lennoxville was opened in 1972. It is situated in the Eastern Townships on an attractive site which it shares with Bishop's University.

== Campus life ==
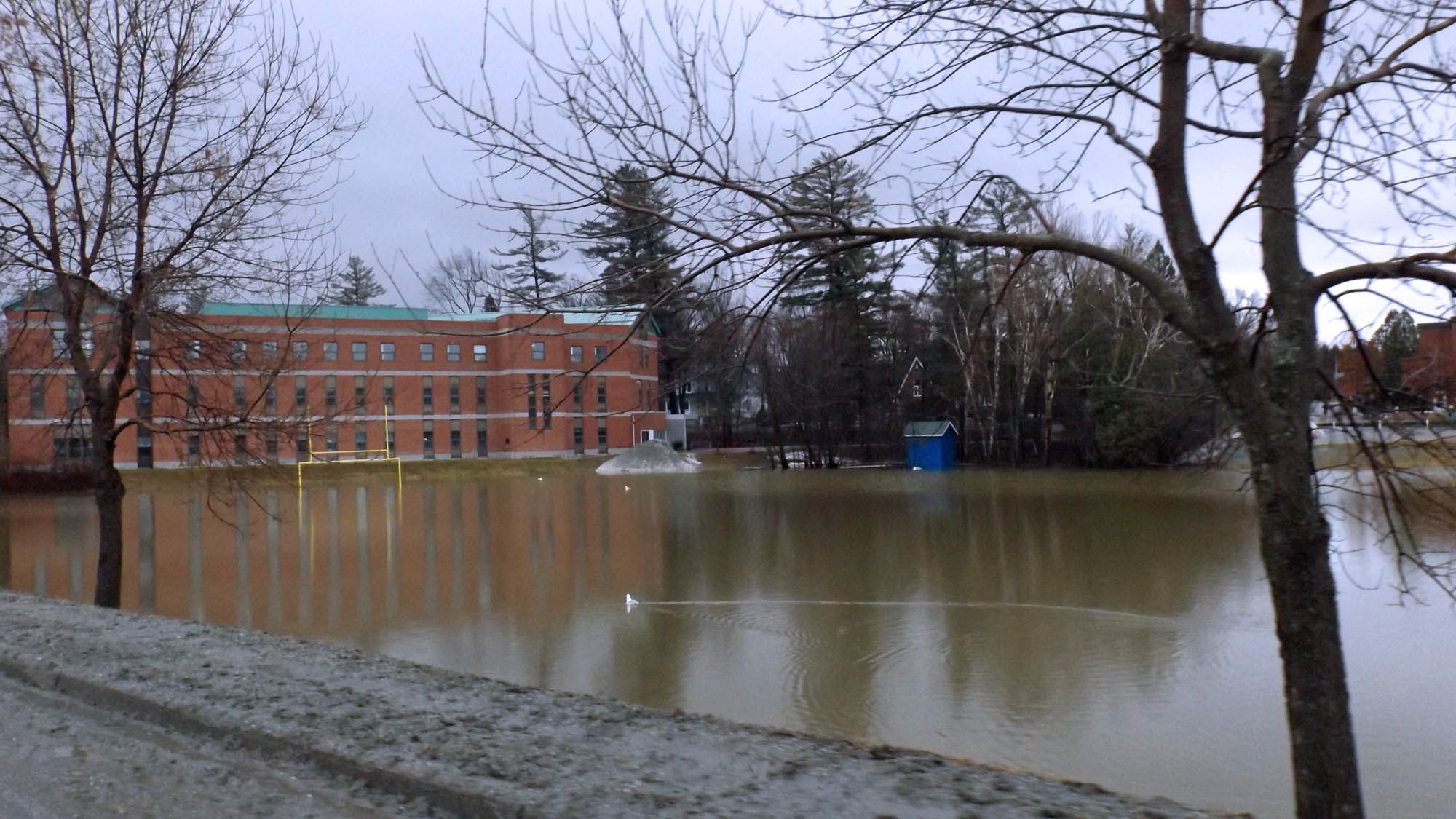
The college in spring, with extreme flooding of low-lyingsportsfield. .

The fact that Champlain Lennoxville is located in a rural setting has contributed to an increasing numbers of students who seek an alternative to continuing their post-secondary education in an urban environment. As a CEGEP located on a university campus, Champlain Lennoxville offers its students complete access to university facilities. Classrooms, library, laboratories, residences, and athletics are shared by university and college students.

Champlain Lennoxville has a residential complex which consists of 6 buildings with a total of ninety furnished apartments of 3 or 4 bedrooms. All apartments are designated male or female in co-educational buildings.

== The CEGEP System ==
In the English-language sector of Quebec's educational system, students were formerly able to go directly from high school (after completion of Grade XI) to university. In 1967, the Quebec government passed the General and Vocational Colleges Act, providing for a new level of education following high school, the collegial level. Each college is an independent public corporation, separate from both high schools and universities. These community colleges, commonly called CEGEPs after the initials of the French name, "Collège d'enseignement général et professionnel", are distinctive institutions in Quebec. They offer two-year general programs, leading to university studies, and three-year technological programs serving a wide variety of interests. Tuition-free, the junior colleges are open to all residents of Quebec who have completed secondary level and who can meet the standards required for successful completion of the collegial programs.

== Programs ==
The CEGEP offers two types of programs: pre-university and technical. The pre-university programs, which take two years to complete, permit students to enter into a 3-year bachelor program in a Québec university.

- Science Program — Pure & Applied Sciences Option
- Science Program — Health Sciences Option
- Science Program — Computer Science and Mathematics Option
- Social Science — General Profile
- Social Science — Psychology Profile
- Social Science — Commerce Profile
- Social Science — Mathematics Profile
- Social Science — Criminology Profile
- Creative Arts, Literature & Languages — Creative Arts Profile
- Creative Arts, Literature & Languages — Languages and Communications Profile
- Fine Arts
- Liberal Arts (Histoire et Civilisation)

The career programs, which take three years to complete, apply to students who wish to pursue a skill or trade.

- Special Care Counselling
- Accounting and Management Technology
- Computer Information Systems Mobile Information Technology
- Nursing Technology

In addition, the college provides Continuing Education and services to business.

== See also ==
- List of colleges in Quebec
- Higher education in Quebec
