= Monique Desroches =

Quebecois ethnomusicologist (born 1948)

- Born: March 18, 1948 (age 78); Grand-Mère, Quebec, Canada
- Occupation: ethnomusicologist, professor

Academic background
- Education: Université de Montréal; Université de Sherbrooke

Academic work
- Discipline: Ethnomusicology
- Institutions: Université de Montréal

Monique Desroches (born March 18, 1948) is a Canadian ethnomusicologist from Quebec who specializes in the music of the West Indies and the Mascarene Islands in the Indian Ocean.

== Early life ==
Desroches was born in Grand-Mère in Quebec on March 18, 1948. From 1968 to 1974, Desroches was part of a folk group, "Les Contretemps" who released two LPs and three 45s and toured in Canada, the United States and Japan.

== Education ==
Desroches attended college courses at Montreal's College Jean-de-Brebeuf in 1969 before studying psychology at the Université de Montréal. After attending a lecture by Simha Arom, Desroches decided to switch her studies back to music. Desroches completed her Bachelor's in Music at l'Université de Sherbrooke (at the École de music Vincent d'Indy) in 1974 and later completed a Master's and PhD in musicology at the l'Université de Montreal in 1977 and 1987, respectively. Her thesis focused on Tamil ritual music on the island of Martinique, and was supervised by Jean-Claude Muller, and Charles Boilès. She would later hold a post-doctorate fellowship at SOAS in London and at the Université of Aix-Marseille III studying Tamil musical influences on the island of Reunion.

== Career ==
Desroches studied Inuit music in Canada from 1974 through to 1977 as part of a research team led by Jean-Jacques Nattiez before turning her attention to the music of the West Indies in 1978. She would continue her study of Tamil music in the Indian Ocean archipelago in the Mascarenes. From 1978 she began work as a research officer at the Caribbean Research Center at the University of Montreal where she managed a research station in Martinique. She achieved full professorship in 1988 and served in various capacities at the Faculty of Music. During her academic career, Desroches helped establish and foster several research labs and collections. Beginning in 1989 she began accumulating a collection of musical instruments from around the world. At her retirement in 2015 the collection included over 750 items. In 1995 Desroches helped create the World Music Research Laboratory in order to foster new research and scholarship around the discipline. In 2010 she founded the Laboratory of Ethnomusicology and Organology (LEO) as well as administering CARGO, a network of researchers specializing in the Creole-speaking Caribbean and islands in the Indian Ocean.

== Scholarship and publications ==
Desroches' scholarship focuses on the role of Tamil music in sacrificial rituals in the French West Indies and the Mascarenes as well as the interplay of tourism in Martinique and cultural identity, music, aesthetics and performance.

=== Books ===
- Monique Desroches, Sophie Stévance, Serge Lacasse, Quand la musique prend corps, Presses de l'université de Montréal, 2014, 385 p.
- Monique Desroches, Marie-Hélène Pichette, Claude Dauphin et Gordon Smith, Territoires musicaux mis en scène, Presses de l'Université de Montréal, 2011, 418 p.
- Jean Benoist, Monique Desroches, Gerry L'Étang et Gilbert Ponaman, L'Inde dans les arts de la Guadeloupe et de la Martinique. Héritages et innovations, Matoury, Ibis rouge éditions, Presses universitaires créoles - GEREC-F, 2004, 138 p.
- Monique Desroches, Ghyslaine Guertin, Construire le savoir musical, 2003, Editions L'Harmattan, Paris, 384 p.
- Monique Desroches, Tambours des dieux. Musique et sacrifice d'origine tamoule en Martinique, Montréal, L'Harmattan, 1996, 180 p.
- Monique Desroches with Lyne-Rose Beuze, Les Instruments de musique traditionnelle, Éditions Bureau du Patrimoine, Conseil régional de la Martinique, Fort-de-France,1989, 87 p.

=== Book chapters and journal articles ===
- Monique Desroches, “Musique et rituel: significations, identité et société”, dans " Musiques. Une encyclopédie pour le XXIe siècle", dir. Jean-Jacques Nattiez, Tome 3. Musiques et cultures, p. 538-556.
- Monique Desroches et Ghyslaine Guertin, “Musique, authenticité et valeur,” Une encyclopédie pour le XXIe siècle. Tome 3. Musiques et cultures, dir, Jean-Jacques Nattiez, p. 743-755.
- Monique Desroches, “Indo-créolité, mémoire et construction identitaire” Le monde caraïbe. défis et dynamiques. Tome I. Pessac: Maison des sciences de l'Homme d'Aquitaine, dir Christian Lerat, 2005, p. 385-392.
- Monique Desroches, “Musique, rituel et construction du savoir”, Construire le savoir musical. Enjeux épistémologiques, esthétiques et sociaux, eds. Monique Desroches and Ghyslaine Guertin, Paris: L'Harmattan, 2003, p. 207-219.
- Monique Desroches, “Musique et identité culturelle des tamouls de la Réunion”, Au visiteur lumineux, eds. Jean-Luc Bonniol, Gerry L'Étang, Jean Barnabé and Raphaël Confiant, Ibis Rouge Éditions, GEREC- F/ Presses universitaires créoles, 2000, p. 321-330.
- Desroches, Monique; Benoist, Jean (1997). "Musiques, cultes et société indienne à la Réunion". Anthropologie et Sociétés (in French). 21 (1): 39–52. doi:10.7202/015460ar. ISSN 0702-8997. S2CID 161081487.
- Monique Desroches et Ghyslaine Guertin, “Regards croisés de l'esthétique et de l'ethnomusicologie,” PROTÉE, vol. 25, no 2, automne 1997, p. 77-83.
- Monique Desroches, “Créolisation musicale et identité culturelle aux Antilles françaises” Revue canadienne des études latino-américaines et caraïbes, vol. 17, no. 34, 1992, p. 41-51.
- Monique Desroches et Jean Benoist, “Tambours de l'Inde à la Martinique. Structure sonore d'un espace sacré” Études créoles. Culture, langue, société, vol. V, nos 1–2, 1982, p. 39-58.
- Monique Desroches, “Les pratiques musicales, image de l'histoire, reflet d'un contexte”, Historial antillais. Tome I. Guadeloupe et Martinique. Des îles aux hommes, ed. Jean-Luc Bonniol, Adjani Éditions, 1981, p. 491-500.
- Monique Desroches, “Validation empirique de la méthode sémiologique en musique : le cas des indicatifs de tambour dans les cérémonies indiennes en Martinique," Yearbook of the International Folk Music Council, vol. 12, 1980, p. 67-76.
