= Bureau de coopération interuniversitaire =

The Bureau de coopération interuniversitaire (BCI, in English Office of Interuniversity Cooperation) - formerly the Conférence des recteurs et des principaux des universités du Québec (CREPUQ, in English Conference of Rectors and Principals of Quebec Universities) - is a private organization which unites, on a voluntary basis, all Quebec universities. The objective of the BCI is to coordinate universities and higher education establishments of Quebec, to represent them in the national and international bodies and to facilitate the evolution of universities. Founded in 1963, CREPUQ was incorporated non-profit in 1967; it has a permanent secretariat since January 1968. Its current (2014) president is Guy Breton. Recteur, Université de Montréal; its current (2014) CEO is Claude Bedard.

== International exchanges ==
The students exchange program CREPUQ provides internationally academic exchanges. Many students come each year to perform one or more years of study in Quebec through this program, which offers various ways in affiliated countries. In France, students are generally exempt from payment of import duties in the Quebec university home and can graduate by French educational equivalence.

== See also ==
- Erasmus Programme
