= TAV College =

Canadian private college

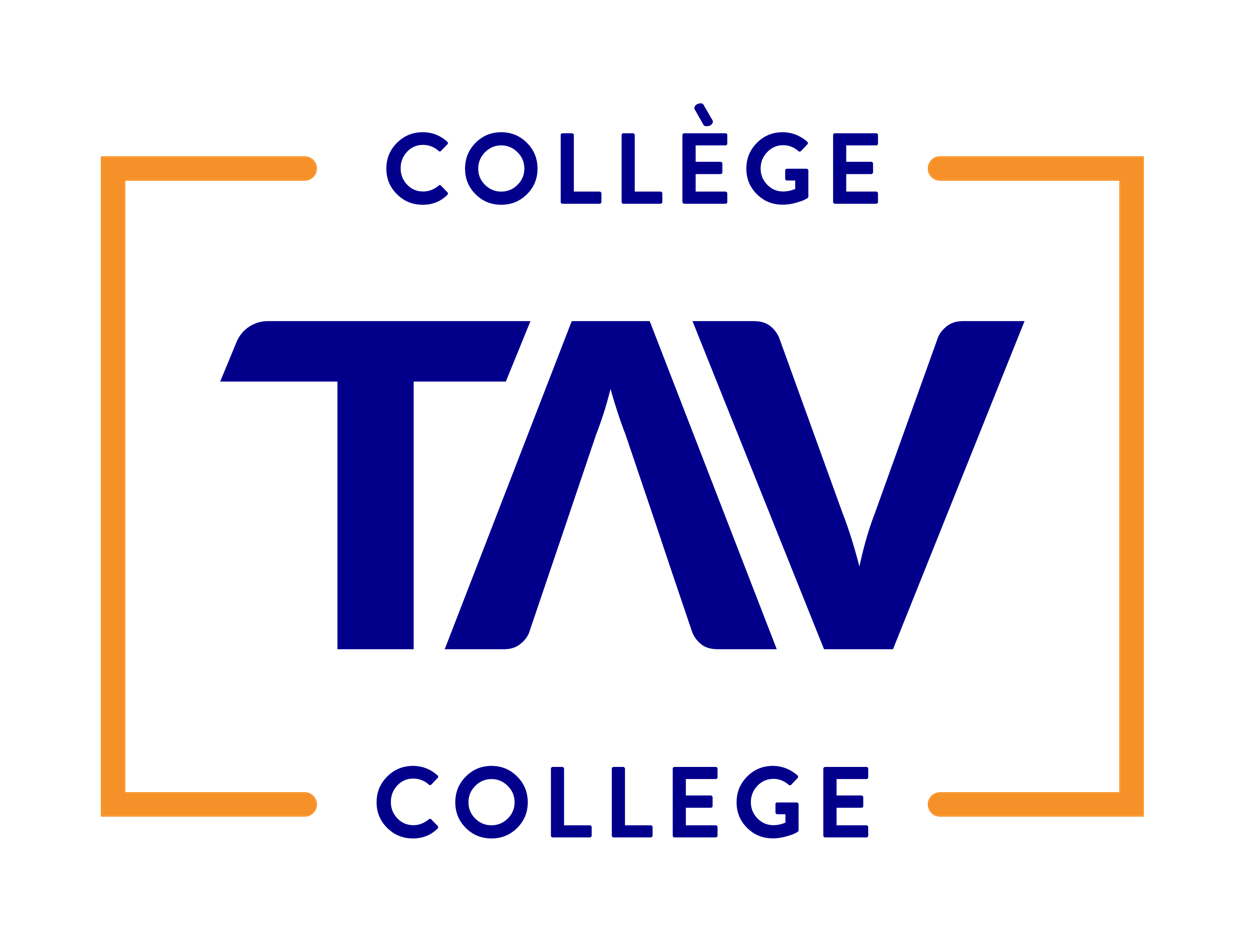
- Other names: Technology and Vocational College; Collège Décarie
- Former names: Torah and Technology School; Torah and Vocational Institute
- Type: Private CÉGEP
- Established: 1989
- Founders: Abraham Boyarsky
- Director: Elazar Meroz
- Location: 6333 Décarie Boulevard, Montreal, Quebec, H3W 3E1, Canada
- Language: English, French
- Website: tav.ca

TAV College (French: Collège TAV) is a not-for-profit private CÉGEP in the Snowdon neighbourhood of Montreal, Quebec.

== History ==
The Torah and Technology School was founded in 1989, with the aim of providing vocational training to members of the ultra-Orthodox Jewish community. It was later renamed the Torah and Vocational (TAV) Institute. TAV received government funding via an affiliation with the public CÉGEP Collège Marie-Victorin, through which students could obtain a Diploma of College Studies or Attestation of College Studies certificate.

In 1999, TAV signed a three-year agreement with the Université du Québec à Montréal (UQAM), under which students at TAV could earn university credits. The partnership ended the following year due to objections from UQAM's professors' union that some courses at TAV were gender-segregated and taught in English. TAV launched a lawsuit against UQAM for $8.1 million in damages.

Quebec's Ministry of Education and Higher Education cut the institute's funding in 2009 by ending its partnership with Collège Marie-Victorin, on the grounds that TAV didn't offer classes on Jewish holidays and that some classes were gender-segregated. TAV was accredited as an independent, private CÉGEP by the Ministry in 2010, and renamed the Technology and Vocational (TAV) College.

TAV College introduced a Grade 12 program in 2022 in response to Bill 96, which introduced caps on how many students could be admitted to English-language CÉGEPs.
