= Cégep de Sept-Îles =

Public college in Sept-Îles, Quebec

Coordinates: 50.227277°N 66.352948°W

Cégep de Sept-Îles is a bilingual College of general and vocational education (CEGEP) in Sept-Îles, Quebec, Canada. It is located at 175 rue De La Vérendrye. It was established in 1980.
