= Quebec Attestation of College Studies =

Academic certificate in Canadian province of Quebec

Attestation of College Studies (ACS) (French: Attestation d'études collégiales (AEC)) is the name for a certificate awarded by a college in the Canadian province of Quebec. The Quebec education system is unique in North America, one aspect of that uniqueness is that it is the only system that has four different education levels: elementary school, high school, college, and university.

While a College Diploma for pre-university studies is awarded by the Ministry of Education, Recreation and Sports, these vocational certificates are awarded by a college's continuing education department.
