= Higher education in Quebec =

Higher education system in Quebec, Canada

Map of Quebec showing the locations of university main campuses

Higher education in Quebec differs from the education system of other provinces in Canada. Instead of entering university or college directly from high school, students in Quebec leave secondary school after Grade 11 (or Secondary V), and enter post-secondary studies at the college level, as a prerequisite to university. Although both public colleges (CEGEPs) and private colleges exist, both are colloquially termed CEGEPs. This level of post-secondary education allows students to choose either a vocational path or a more academic path.

Many factors have led to the province's current system of higher education, including linguistic, cultural and class tensions, as well as provincial distribution of natural resources and population. The Quiet Revolution of the 1960s also brought about many changes that are still reflected in the province's higher education system.

The provincial government is responsible for education in Quebec through the Ministry of Education, Recreation and Sport.

Higher education in Quebec is available in both English and French at all levels. Unlike at the primary and secondary levels of education, wherein English-language instruction is permitted only under very specific circumstances, all tertiary students can choose to pursue post-secondary studies (in college and university) in English. As of 2011, there are seventeen universities, three of which are English-language institutions. There are 54 CEGEPs in total, in six of which the language of instruction is English.

== History ==
=== 1600s and 1700s ===
Formal education in Quebec began almost four hundred years ago, with the arrival of the Ursuline nuns to Lower Canada, and later the inauguration of the Jesuit College was inaugurated in 1635 in Quebec City. The Jesuit College's initial vocation was to give the children of the colonists a classical education. It was the only institution to offer both primary and secondary instruction throughout the French régime. The Quebec Seminary opened in 1663 through the merging of the Petit Séminaire and Grand Séminaire. This institution was initially formed to train the citizens of the colony to be priests and church ministers. The Quebec Seminary later founded Université Laval. The clerical presence in Quebec education would continue into the 20th century, later developing into a schism between Catholic and Protestant Quebec.

While the system was initially private, in 1789, a Commission on Education chaired by Judge William Smith proposed the establishment of a public system from elementary school through to university. It recommended that the system include a non-denominational university governed by lay and religious representatives – both Catholic and Protestant – that would attract members of both faiths. The Catholic clergy were suspicious of Protestant influence and Smith's recommendations were rejected. This report was a catalyst for debate about the divided nature of the Quebec education system. The system did not secularize until the Quiet Revolution of the 1960s.

=== 1800s ===
Higher Education in Quebec was established at the base of Mont Royal in Montreal when James McGill left £10,000 and a forty-six acre estate for the founding of a university in 1821. Eight years later classes at McGill University began when a Montreal medical school was merged with McGill. Four years later William Leslie Logie was the first graduate, awarded a Doctor of Medicine and Surgery. Collège Sainte-Marie de Montréal was created in 1848 by the Jesuits. Three years later, in 1851, Université Laval was founded in Quebec City as the first major French Language higher education institution. Laval University grew out of the Quebec Seminary. In 1843, Bishops University was established in Lennoxville. Specializing in undergraduate education, its mandate was to represent both British and rural Quebec traditions. Twenty years later (1873) the École Polytechnique opened in Montreal. Then in 1896, Loyola College was founded as the English sector of the Jesuit Collège Sainte-Marie de Montréal.
The flourishing of English-language education in this period reflects the English conquest of Quebec, and it corresponded to an exodus of French clergy that seriously compromised the French-language education of the period. "Of all the educational problems in "Quebec in the second half of the century, none was perceived as moer serious or persistent than the rural school problem" (the rural, in the demographics of the era, was almost exclusively French). So, French-language education in this period suffered while the Anglophone system progressed.

=== 1900–1960 ===
In 1915, the École des Hautes Études Commerciales opened in Montreal. Five year later, the École des Hautes Études Commerciales merged with the École Polytechnique and a branch of Laval University forming the University of Montreal in 1920. Although merged, all three institutions maintained unique identities. Sir George Williams College was founded in Montreal in 1926, offering evening classes for the English-speaking community. Sir George William College received a university charter from the provincial government and became Sir George William University. 1954 saw the founding of the University of Sherbrooke. Similar in nature to Bishop's University, it was created to meet the needs of francophones in Quebec.

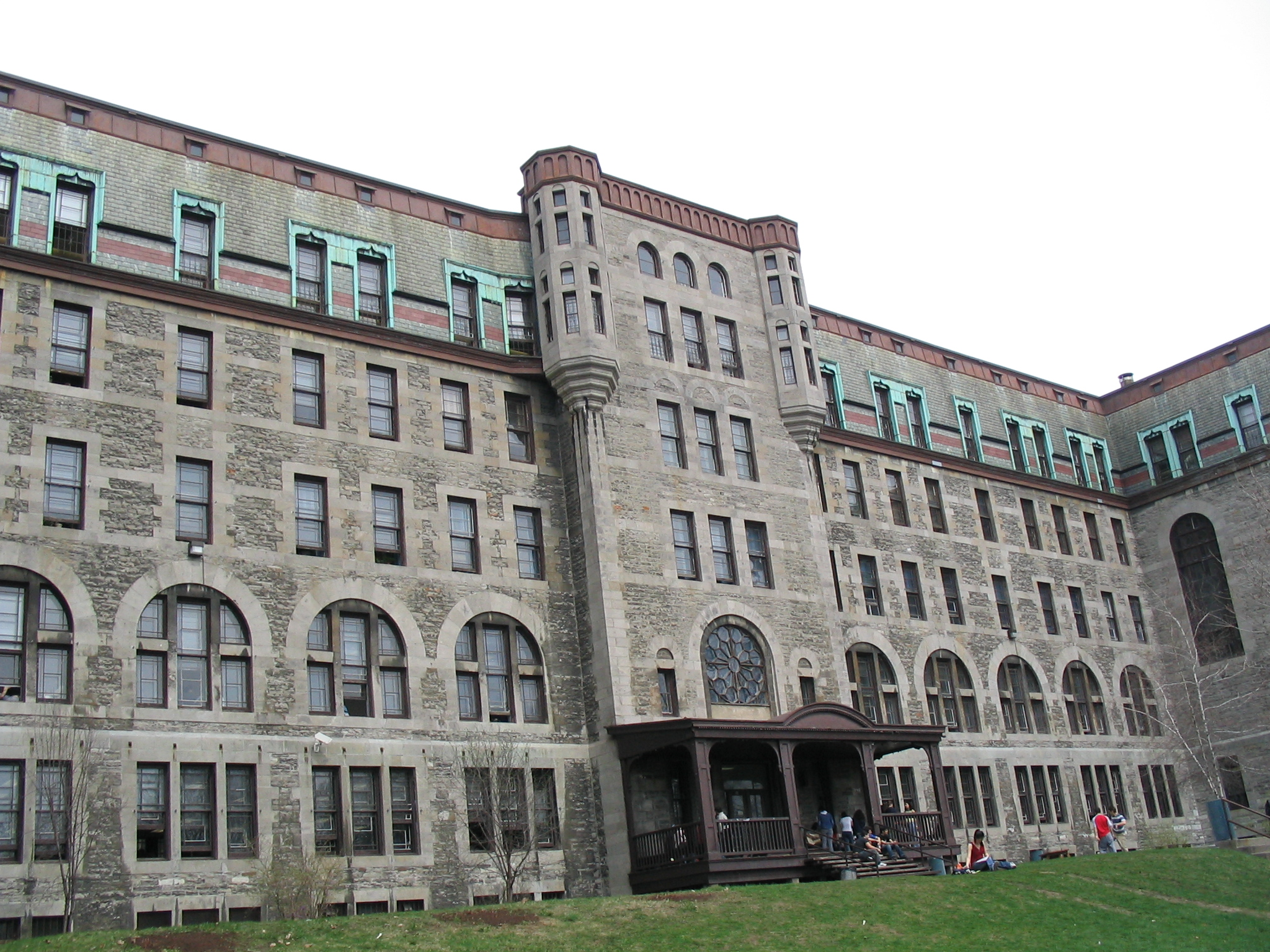
Marianopolis at Côte-des-Neiges.

1945 – 1959:

- Period of rapid economic and population growth: due to high birth rate and immigration

- Postwar industrial development led to a new middle class (Quebec society was still rural and was categorized according to religion and language)

- French Quebec had the highest elementary school drop out rate (52% from grade 2 to grade 8) in Canada, and English Quebec the lowest (10%).

- classical colleges: organized to provide a classical and general education, rather than meet postwar needs for science, technology and commerce.

- colleges were vulnerable: they "depended upon volunteer religious teachers, and the curriculum focused almost entirely on the humanities".

By 1959, there were three French-language universities: Laval, Montreal and Sherbrooke. There were two teacher training colleges, or Normal Schools (St. Joseph's Teacher College), two liberal arts colleges (Loyola and Marianopolis) and three English-language universities (McGill, Bishop's and George William.

Prior to 1960, Francophone Quebec had been traditionally loyal to the church, had an elitist view of society and separated from economic concerns. The church was the authority in education in the province.

The National Film Board of Canada documentary "Collèges classiques" (1961), directed by Pierre Patry, documents the origins of Classical Colleges in Quebec and discusses changes, such as an increasing emphasis on the sciences.

=== 1960–2000 ===
Jean Lesage was elected as premier of Quebec in 1960, and instituted sweeping educational reforms, setting up the structure still in place today. Re-structuring the education system was part of the larger Quiet Revolution, in which Quebec (especially Francophones) modernized and secularized. Under the Lesage government, the recommendations of the Parent Report were taken up and had lasting effect on Quebec education, including unprecedented amounts of public spending on education. The Parent Report helped create the Ministry of Education (later renamed Ministry of Education, Recreation and Sports), the CEGEP system, as well as to dismantle the denominational schism in Quebec's school system. The Protestant and Catholic school boards formalized by the late 19th century operated with barely any communication with each other, the result of which was a sharp difference in the quality of education for Catholic and Protestant (corresponding to Francophone and Anglophone) citizens of Quebec. The population served by the Protestant school board was substantially smaller than that of the Catholic, benefitting also from more secular educational principles inspired by the Scottish model. The Quiet Revolution and the Parent Report addressed long-standing inequality between English and French Quebec, though the Report was also part of a larger national trend during this period (e.g. The MacDonald Report in British Columbia).

The Parent Report: Democratization and Access to higher education were priorities for the Quebec Government. Therefore, the government recognized the need for development of its educational resources, which led to the Parent Commission, a mandate to investigate the entire educational system in Quebec. This commission conducted public hearings, visited more than 50 institutions throughout the province, interviewed more than 200 experts, and visited educational institutions in other provinces, in the US and Europe.

Democratization of the system and Access to students were the key words in the report, and the access referred to students were not being prevented by geography or finances from going as far as possible in the system. A universal right to education was unquestioned. This premise was revolutionary, because the post-compulsory education (after the age of 14) was a privilege or a luxury, not suitable for everyone.

According to Henchey and Burgess, there have been five major changes to the Quebec Higher Education system since the 1960s:

1. The demand on the post secondary system saw increases of sixty percent per decade until the 1980s. This growth was due largely to the growth in Quebec's population and the need for more specialized post-secondary training requirements. With enrolment increasing by one hundred and fifty percent from 1967 until 1983, a joint committee was established whose representatives included secondary school personnel and university admissions officers for the purpose of consolidating and an expanding regular programs. This helped to smooth articulation between the various colleges and universities, both public and private, which increased the volume of students. This committee was the result of a provincial royal commission recommendation that stressed the need to accommodate an increasing demand for higher education, and to provide industry with the higher degree of skilled labour required in the industrialized province. In 1969, ÉNAP (École Nationale d'Administration Publiques) forms as the Public Administration University, and in October 1972, Télé-université is established as a multi-mode francophone university when parliament created the Commission of the Télé-université, on an experimental basis, for a five-year period. Loyola would cease to exist in 1974 when it is merged with Sir George Williams University to become Concordia University. Although both institutions had religious roots as Jesuit and Christian, Concordia is established as a secular institution. Collège Militaire Royal de Saint-Jean opens in 1985 and offers instruction in the sciences.
2. The establishment of CEGEPS and the University of Quebec System changed the institutional patterns.

In 1967, Bill 21 established the CÉGEPs. In September 1967, there were twelve CEGEPS. A year later in September 1968, the number of CEGEPs almost doubled to twenty-three colleges. Dawson College opened in 1969 as the first English language CEGEP. Three years later (1971), there were forty CÉGEPs. The current (2015) number of CEPEGs in Quebec is forty-eight. The CEGEPs assumed the role of instructing advanced general courses; essentially removing the freshman year from university. Because the CEGEP graduate was given 30 credits toward a bachelor's degree leaving only 90 credits, the university courses became more specialized and of course shorter. Also, prior to the Quiet Revolution, a Bachelor of Science degree took an English student four years of attending university. Their French counterpart was required to complete an undergraduate degree in general arts before entrance into three additional years of Science Studies; thus, CEGEPs standardize the required duration of training for both English and French students.

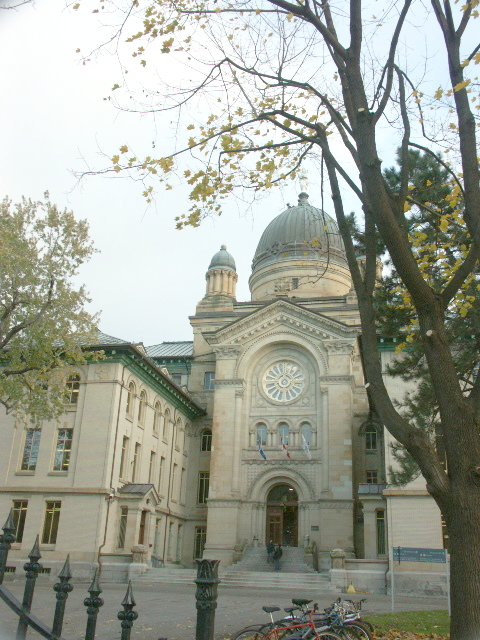
Dawson College

In 1979, the Conseil de Collèges was established to make revisions to the act governing colleges. It developed two commissions: one for general (academic) and one for vocational. Revisions of the laws governing colleges conducted in 1984 establishing a new set of regulations for programs. Also in 1984, the saw the development of an annual report, Cahiers de l'enseignement collegial interested in regulations respecting the basis of college education. In 1985, a policy statement of the Council of Collèges is published titled "Les CÉGEPs de demain."

The University of Quebec system was created in 1968, though the passing of Bill 88. It was modelled after state university systems in New York State and California. It was developed with a central administration office located in Quebec City with four initial campuses: Montreal, Trois Rivières, Rimouski, Chicoutimi. By delivering higher education in this format, the University of Quebec has provided access to many social and economic groups that may have otherwise restricted from pursuing further education due to their geographic location. Specialized courses are offering at the various regional campus are designed with local representatives and ecological orientation. The initial philosophies were meant to be more democratic, less elite and more flexible. Collège Sainte-Marie de Montréal was one of the institutions that merged to create UQAM in 1969. In this same year, the Institut Nationale de Recherches Scientifiques (INRS) developed as a research arm of the University of Quebec.

The Seventies: Decade of Planning and Development

During this decade post-secondary enrolments multiplied once again. Cégep enrolments doubled in the two-year pre-university programs and tripled in the three-year technical programs. Five English language Cégeps (four public and one private) came into full operation. Technical institutes and most classical colleges were integrated. Most universities were unionized, and differing visions of teachers and administrators over college policies and working conditions meant conflict and turbulence. In the universities, the student population increased by 87% in full-time programs, with an increase in part-time from 1/3 to ½ of the university population. The student population had a more heterogeneous background, and increased the numbers of women and older students. Institut Armand Frappier was established as a component of the INRS in 1975. Disciplines at the Institut Armand Frappier are focused around health science research including immunology and environmental biotechnology. The Université Québec à Hull (UQAH) was added to the University of Quebec system in 1972.

In 1974, TELUQ first offered its course titled COO 1001, Initiation with Co-operation. This course was created in partnership Desjardins, and two years later (1976) TELUQ offered its first program titled "Certificate in Knowledge of Man and Medium" (CHEM). The first graduate from this program was Pierre Vincent of Saint-Foy, Quebec. In 1990, TELUQ offered its first baccalaureat in communication, and by 1997 TELUQ was receiving a subsidy of nine million dollars for technological modernization. The head office of Téluq in Quebec took hold of its own buildings, which is similar to the structure of the Montreal office. 1974 saw the inauguration of École de Technologique Supérieur (ÉTS) which specializes in the delivery of engineering and technology. The École de Technologique Supérieur (ETS) has developed industry partnerships to build the curriculum and provide instructors.

1. Attempts to coordinate and rationalize the traditionally independent universities into a network that reflects the growing financial dependence of universities on government grants. In 1968, Bill 57 was passed to establish the Council of Universities (Conseil des universités) to help strengthen the network of universities in Quebec. The Council's responsibilities included implementing a plan of development and financing education.
2. Curriculum changes involving new programs, more specialized B.A.s and short certificates and diplomas, and the integration of teacher education into the universities. The Quiet Revolution in the 1960s was instrumental in the development of the current higher education system. The Parent Report released in 1964 was essentially the blueprint for university development in Quebec. It reported that Quebec primary and secondary school teachers ranked significantly lower than those in other jurisdictions of North America. 1961–62 figures indicate that 90% of Catholic (French) teachers and 65% of Protestant (English) teachers had less than or equal to 13 years of schooling. The Quebec Government believed that success in school reform hinged on having well qualified teachers, and teacher education underwent major changes in the preparation and qualification for those entering the profession. The Quebec universities assumed the duties of administering teacher education. By the end of the 1960s, undergraduate degrees became the minimum requirement for new teachers in the K-V system.
3. Periodic analysis of the role of universities in society and the kind of policies that would be appropriate for future university development.

In 1975, NADEAU Report was commissioned. Higher education in Quebec was also subject to a cultural development policy in 1978. In 1978, Les Collèges de Québec Nouvelles Étapes Report was commissioned. The Commission d'etude sur les Universities (CEU) was commissioned as for volumes in 1979.

Essentially, "the reforms fundamentally altered the character and pattern of education, changing it from a decentralized, church dominated system serving an elite to a centralized, state controlled one catering to a mass population."

During the eighties, the number of students enrolled in post-secondary studies once again exceeded the forecasts. Forecast for 1986 was 100,000 students in the colleges – actual number: 160,000. In the universities - forecast: 90,000 student, and the actual number of enrolments were 115,000.

A major recession in 1981-1982 led to increased levels of unemployment, reduction of salaries, a series of budget cuts to the universities. As a consequence, left the universities to deal with increasing number of students with reduced resources.

=== 2000 and beyond ===
In 2005, the government of Quebec authorizes the joining of the TÉLUQ and the UQAM. This decision was made by decree of the Council of Ministers on May 18, 2005 on recommendation of the Minister for Education, Recreation and Sport, Mr Jean-Marc Fournier. This amalgamation, which makes of Téluq a component of the UQAM within the University of Quebec, was carried out by the delivery of additional letters patent to the UQAM.

In 2012, Quebec government cut almost half of the funding of universities in their budget, around 250 million, and suggested to increase the tuition fees. The universities were in trouble. For example, in Concordia University, there was a $13.2 million less comparing the 2012-2013 and 2013-2014 fiscal year. The costs were required to be decreased. In the 2013-2014 fiscal year, the academic sector had to reduce costs by 2.5% while others reduced by 6.6%. Quebec students were angry about the tuition fee hike and organized strikes to protest against it.

After experiencing 3-months’ protest against university tuition fee hike in 2012, five policy projects instituted in 2013 Higher Education Summit. The policy project on university funding is paid great attention to. The Board of Trade of Metropolitan Montreal offers a few basic principles and orientations for this policy project, which indicates some ideas of the future of higher education in Quebec. The first principle is that the government is assigned the permanent and essential responsibility to solve the problem of university underfunding. Secondly, the policy should respect the diversity of universities and stimulate their performance. The policy should aim to ensure greater access, to maintain good quality of higher education as well as to increase international visibility through retain prominent talent, professors and researchers from all over the world.

Meanwhile, the policy should encourage university performance by recognizing the diversity of the university network and respecting the autonomy of universities. Thirdly, there should be a funding formula that enhancing universities. For example, the field of study should be considered to adjust tuition fees. The Ceiling on tuition for students from outside could be lifted. There could be mandatory institutional fees to provide extra funding for the universities.

== Equity and access ==
Access is at the top of the government's list of three key orientations in the Quebec Policy on universities, published in 2000. The objectives are to: "ensure that the economic obstacles to access to higher education are reduced to a minimum; ensure geographical access to university education, particularly through the presence of the university of Quebec throughout Quebec and the development of distance education; encourage students to remain in university, particularly by emphasizing support for undergraduates; and, at all levels of higher education, but particularly in graduate studies (master’s and doctoral programs) facilitate the integration of students into research and teaching (MEQ, 2000, P.17)"

Many fiscal strategies of Higher education in Quebec aimed at promoting access: tuition-free college education; allocation of a specific amount for the implementation of the school success plans to be integrated with the Cegeps’ strategic plans; university funding based on the number of students enrolled; regulation of university tuition fees; loans and bursaries program; and university funding partly based on the number of degrees awarded. Others were more specific: tax deductions for students or their parents, special funding for the Tele-Universite and universities in outlying areas, and support programs for members of Aboriginal communities and for integration of the disabled.

=== College ===
Higher education in Québec is a two-step process, starting with a college program before being able to continue on at the university level. Students can pursue their higher education by obtaining a College Education Diploma (or Diploma of College Studies (in French) Diplôme d'Études Collégiale/DEC). Two types of Diplomas exist, a general education diploma, and a vocational education diploma. A general education diploma is required for admittance to universities in Québec. Both public and private colleges exist side by side and have the same diploma granting privileges.

Public colleges are known either by their unofficial English name of General and Vocation Colleges, or their official French acronym of CEGEPs ((in French) Collège d'enseignement général et professionel, word for word translated as "College of General and Vocational Education"). Private colleges are simply called colleges. Although only public colleges can legally be called CEGEPs, most refer to all Québec colleges, public and private, as CEGEPs.

==== Private colleges ====
Quebec has over 20 private colleges that fulfill the same educational requirements as the public CEGEPs, many are specialised institutions with some offering programs that are exclusively vocational.

==== Public colleges ====
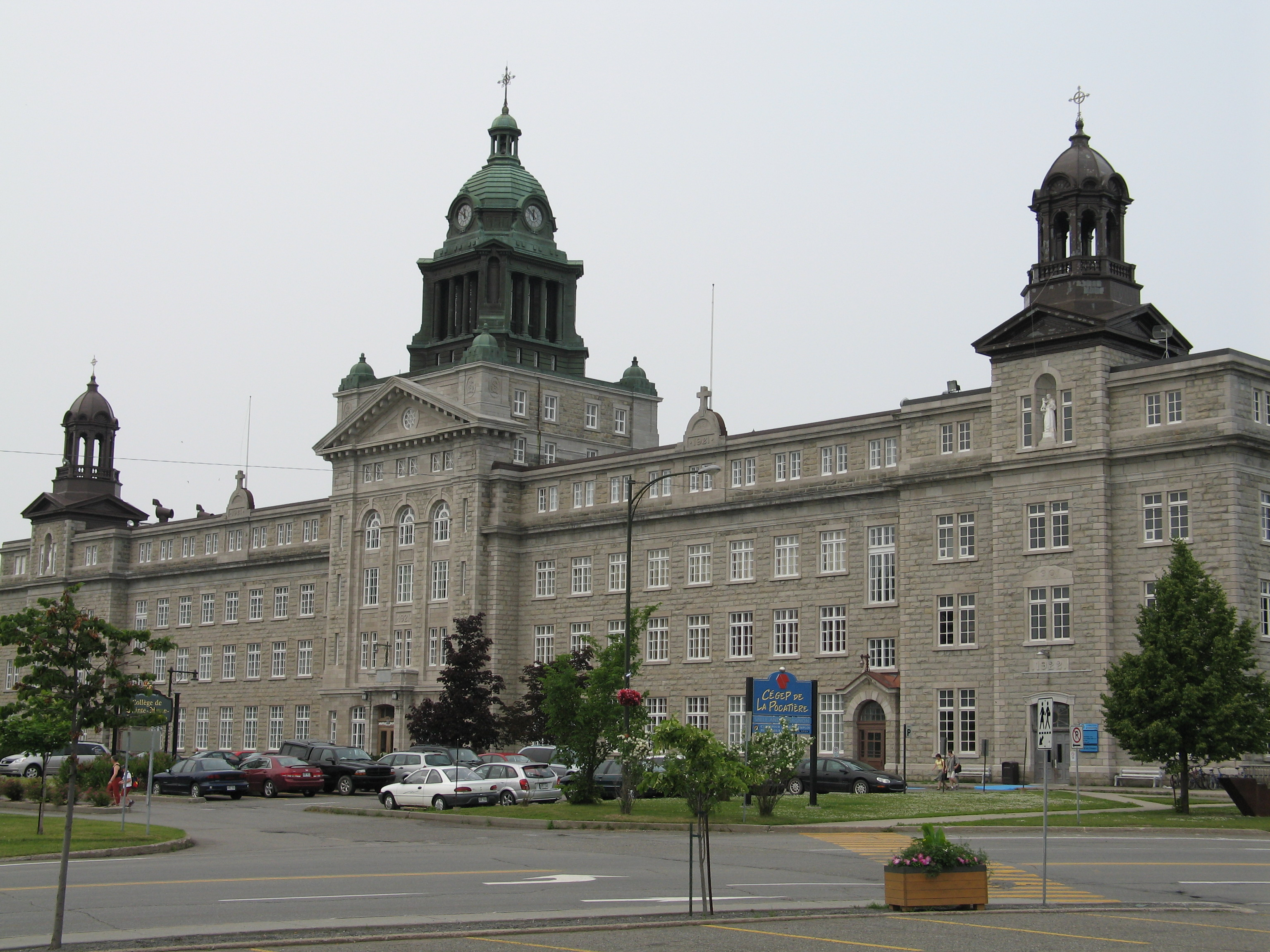
Shared facade of Ste-Anne College and Cégep de La Pocatière, Québec

The 50 or so public general and vocational colleges, or CEGEPs, are governed, in addition to the post-secondary education laws, by separate and specific laws. Each is governed by a board of directors made up of students, faculty, and members of the community. CEGEP institutions are polyvalent offering both pre-university and technical programs. The association with the various religious interests was replaced with a secular and public approach with the intention of increasing access for all social groups. By developing a single structure, it allowed for equality of educational opportunity. Students apply to regional admission services, not to individual CEGEPs. The exceptions to this are Dawson College and Champlain Regional College. There are three regions: Quebec City (Service régional d'admission au collégial de Québec - SRACQ), Metropolitan Montreal (Service régional d'admission du Montréal métropolitain - SRAM), and Saguenay-Lac-Saint-Jean (Service régional d'admission des cégeps du Saguenay-Lac-Saint-Jean - SRASL). English-language CEGEPs are located in Montreal (Dawson College, Vanier College, and John Abbott College), Montérégie (Champlain College Saint-Lambert), the Eastern Townships (Champlain College Lennoxville), and Quebec City (Champlain College St. Lawrence). In addition, the Administrative Offices of Champlain Regional College are located in Sherbrooke, though this is not a location where pedagogy occurs.

There are two aims of CEGEPs. The first aim of CEGEP is to encompass the role of both the classical colleges and the existing technical schools and institute. They were also to harmonize the Quebec system with other European and North American systems that had twelve or thirteen years of schooling before university. Another important aim of CEGEP is to make post-secondary education more accessible in Quebec, as well as to provide proper academic preparation for university. Because the public CEGEP has little or no tuition fees and most of the CEGEP colleges are taught in French, CEGEP provides a solid foundation of high accessibility of Quebec's higher education.

The English-language CEGEPs are particularly popular among immigrants and English-speaking Quebecers. In response, the Quebec government is capping their enrolments, although there is concern that they will become elite institutions, and that Quebecers will increasingly seek higher education outside the province.

=== Universities ===
Since the 1960s, the higher education system in Quebec reacted to an increasing population by offering expanded education access in more regions. Universities in Quebec are actively reducing or eliminating disparities between men and women, metropolitan and rural and French and English. According to Henchey and Burgess, "Quebec is clearly moving in the direction of equality access, especially for French women; however, gaps still remain for other language groups, poor and the isolated."

There are transfer programs available for secondary school grads from outside the province; however, applicants are required to meet entrance requirements as specified by the individual university. Applicants are required to demonstrate proficiency in the language of instruction used at the institution.

==== The University of Quebec (UQ) ====
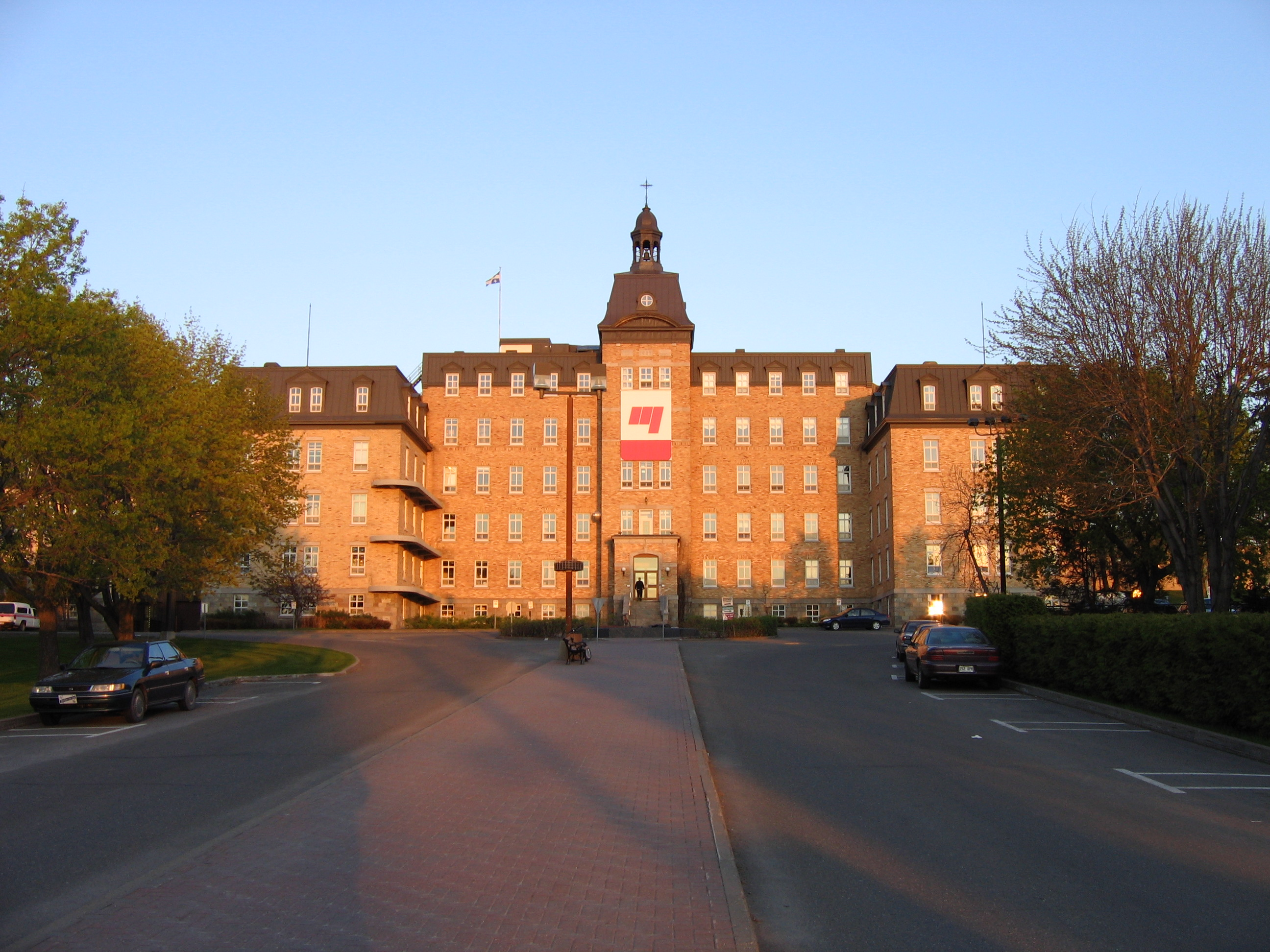
University of Quebec at Rimouski (UQAR)

The University of Quebec is a unique educational system in the province, as it was originally modeled after the state run universities found in California and New York State. The UQ system was a product of the Quiet Revolution, and it was created by the Quebec National Assembly who enacted the "University of Quebec Act" in 1968. According to Magnuson (1980), "The University of Quebec was intended to extend higher education to throughout Quebec in response to expanding enrolments allowing accessible to students in rural communities."

The mission of the University of Quebec is to facilitate the access to university education, to contribute to the scientific development of Quebec and to assist in regional development. In 2007, students had access to adult and university education in seven regions of Quebec through one of the UQ's ten French language institutions. Each campus of the University of Quebec is a legally independent entity, which allows for increased autonomy.

==== Télé-université ====
TÉLUQ, or Télé-université, is a distance learning school at the Université du Québec founded in 1972. In addition to several undergraduate programs, including four bachelor's degrees, TELUQ offers two master's degree programs and one PhD program. Overall, TÉLUQ offers about 400 distance learning courses, including 100 graduate courses. TÉLUQ has about 70 professors and a budget of over $50 million. Though its head office is in Quebec City, about two thirds of its professors are in its Montreal offices.

== Structure ==
=== College education ===
In 1967, the college system was created during the Quiet Revolution to allow French and English students the ability to follow the same educational route. It was initially formed as an amalgamation of the French-language classical colleges, normal schools and technical schools. The CEGEP system quickly replaced the province's classical colleges, which numbered ninety-eight in 1966-67, to less than twenty in five years' time. The English schools, however, had to be created from scratch because the only two existing English colleges (Loyola and Marianopolis) were converted into other educational institutions. Loyola merged with Sir George University to become Concordia University, and Marianopolis became a private college.

Two types of programs are offered:

1) two year general education (pre- university) programs leading to university.

General Arts include: science, social sciences, creative arts, music, fine arts, language, literature and oral communications.

2) various three year vocational programs leading to the workforce.

Vocational Programs: biological sciences, physical sciences, social sciences, administrative sciences and fine arts.

As of 2008, there were forty-eight CEGEPs, twenty five private colleges, ten institutions operated by government departments, and one college under university. English as the medium of instruction is offered in six of these colleges: Champlain Regional College (with campuses in St. Lambert, Lennoxville in the Eastern Townships and Quebec City), Dawson College, Heritage College, John Abbott College, Marianopolis, and Vanier. Upon completion of a college program, a student is awarded a DEC - Diploma of College Studies. This certification is awarded to student who have completed either the vocational stream or the academic stream. The college system streamlined access to universities, as English students were previously eligible for post secondary studies after eleven years of schooling, but French students once required fifteen years of schooling, although, Smith et al., indicated that French students were previously required to complete sixteen years of study before university. In the 1970s through early 1980s, "the colleges became heavily involved in programs of continuing education, community development and recently programs of international cooperation with developing nations."

In 1999, Andre Michaud indicated that the rates of completion for Quebec students was greater than forty percent for high school students and greater than twenty-five percent for university students.

=== General overview of university education ===
One of the objectives of the Quebec education system is to provide access to university services to the whole province of Quebec. Physical accessibility with these services results either in a physical university campus or a centre of teaching establishment in the area, or through distance education. University services are offered in all regions of Quebec. Thus, the majority of universities have several centres of teaching and research, which make up the university campus. In general, the head office of the university is found at this centre. However, in order to meet the needs of populations further removed from the campuses, universities often offer classes at satellite centres distant from their principal campus. These are generally offered on a part-time.

Another way of making university education more accessible is through the integrated use of media, such as in printed paper form, television and telematics. The Télé-université, establishment of the network of the University of Quebec, specializes in this mode of distance education. More than 5,100 students are registered there, including more than 3,200 women and nearly 1,900 men. Most of these students enter in the first cycle (September), although some are enrolled part-time. As well, three out of four students are 30 years old or older. Quebec universities confer more than 35 000 university degrees annually. In the 1990s, the annual number of decreed university degrees grew considerably. The rate of obtaining a baccalaureat in Quebec is among the highest in the world.

Canadian system (excluding Québec)			Grade/Year	Québec system
		Elementary School; Grade 1	1	Primary School; 1st
		Grade 2	2	2nd
		Grade 3	3	3rd
		Grade 4	4	4th
		Grade 5	5	5th
		Grade 6	6	6th
		Secondary School; Grade 7	7	Secondary; I
		Grade 8	8	II
		High school Grade 9	9	III
Vocational high school Apprenticeship programs at secondary level « Apprenticeship Option » (varies from province to province)		Grade 10	10	IV	DEP
Vocational high school Apprenticeship programs at secondary level « Apprenticeship Option » (varies from province to province)		Grade 11	11	V DES (Secondary Diploma)	DEP
Vocational high school Apprenticeship programs at secondary level « Apprenticeship Option » (varies from province to province)		Grade 12 'High School; Diploma'	12	College (2 years) DEC (Diploma of College Studies)	College (3 years) Technical DEC
University College (2 years) 'College diploma' (4 years) Bachelor's degree	Community College (2 years) 'College diploma'	University; Undergraduate (4 years) Bachelor's degree	13	College (2 years) DEC (Diploma of College Studies)	College (3 years) Technical DEC
University College (2 years) 'College diploma' (4 years) Bachelor's degree	Community College (2 years) 'College diploma'	University; Undergraduate (4 years) Bachelor's degree	14	University; 1st cycle (3 years and 4 years for engineering); Baccalaureate Diploma	College (3 years) Technical DEC
University College (2 years) 'College diploma' (4 years) Bachelor's degree		University; Undergraduate (4 years) Bachelor's degree	15	University; 1st cycle (3 years and 4 years for engineering); Baccalaureate Diploma
University College (2 years) 'College diploma' (4 years) Bachelor's degree		University; Undergraduate (4 years) Bachelor's degree	16	University; 1st cycle (3 years and 4 years for engineering); Baccalaureate Diploma
		Graduate « Graduate school » Master's degree	17	2nd cycle Master's	DESS (Specialized studies diploma)
		Graduate « Graduate school » Master's degree	18	2nd cycle Master's
		Postgraduate; Doctorate	19	3rd cycle Doctorate
		Postgraduate; Doctorate	20	3rd cycle Doctorate
		Postgraduate; Doctorate	21	3rd cycle Doctorate

Higher Education :

General stream
Technical/Vocational stream

== Governance ==
=== College ===
College Education is governed by the provisions of the General and Vocational Colleges Education Regulations. The public colleges are legal institutions each with a Board of Governors (BOG) composed of twenty members appointed by the Ministry of Higher Education. It includes senior administrators, personal and students of the college, parents and representatives of regional groups. Each College also has an Academic Council with 20 members of which the majority are instructors. The administrative head of the institution is the director general. The colleges level below the director general is the academic dean and the director of student services. Other administrators, directors, deans and coordinators make up the next tier of the institution. Private colleges are governed by the Act Respecting Private Education, and regulations adopted under this act known as the Regulation Respecting the Application of the Act Respecting Private Education, but they are still subject to the same College Education Regulations, which apply to public CEGEP's.

=== Universities ===
"Since the 1960s the Quebec government has assumed a more commanding presence in university policy than was previously the case, allocating resources, standardizing procedures, setting broad policies objectives and attempting to rationalize the university system in the interest of the common good" In December 2006, the Institute for Governance of Private and Public Organizations, announced the creation of a study group on the governance of Quebec universities. The mandate of the group was three-fold. The first was to assess current practices and challenges for the proper governance of universities in Quebec and elsewhere. Second was to assess various principles and practices put in place to improve the quality of university governance in Quebec and around the world, and the final mandate was to make specific recommendations that are likely to enhance the quality of university governance in Quebec. The eleven member group consisted of university rectors, chancellors and principals as well as board members of various universities across the province. Their report was released in September 2007. It was rejected by the Fédération québécoise des professeures et professeurs d'université (FQPPU) as well as the McGill Association of University Teachers (MAUT) and the Concordia University Faculty Association (CUFA).

In February 2008, representatives of CUFA and MAUT denounced the report's recommendations in a written response to the study group's report. The report recommended a fifteen-member board of governors, where ten members are to be external. The board would also be responsible for hiring and compensation of senior administration as well as strategic planning and establishment of performance measures for teaching and research. The report did not take into account the current bicameral system of a board of governors as well as a senate, a system in place across North American universities. CUFA and MAUT were concerned about the lack of academic presence, both in teachers and in students, as well as the overwhelming presence of corporate and business interests on the proposed structure of the board.

=== Provincial bodies that influence the higher education system in Quebec ===
Association of Private Colleges of Quebec (Association des collèges privés du Québec (APCQ)) acts as the voice of twenty-two private subsidized colleges in order to promote education at the college level.

Confédération des Syndicats Nationaux (CSN), most public college instructors are associated with this union.

Council of Education (Conseil supérieure de l'Éducation) is composed of twenty-two members and is an advisor body to the Minister of Education, Recreation and Sport. This council is independent from the Minister, but it provides suggestions and information about the state of education in the province. It conducts research and encourages stake holder to provide their input.

Commission of College Teaching Evaluation (Commission d'évaluation de l'enseignement collégial) acts as an independent government organization whose evaluation mandate covers most aspects of college education, with special emphasis on student achievement and programmes of studies. Legislation attributes to the Commission the power to evaluate and make recommendations, as well as to exercise a declaratory power.

Conférence des recteurs et des principaux des universités du Québec (Conference of Rectors and Principles of Quebec (CREPUQ)). This group is an association of university institutions. The CREPUQ currently has a campaign promoting the importance of higher education titled Knowledge Matters, to promote the benefit of having a well-educated, highly skilled society.

- Services provided by CREPUQ include the following:
  - Evaluation of program projects by the Commission of Evaluation of Program Projects (CEP)
  - Verification of program evaluation processes of university programs in Quebec through its Commission of verification of program evaluation (CVEP)
  - Follow-up committee on programs through the work of the Commission of universities on programs.
  - Integration centre of information technologies and communication to university teaching and its site PROFeTIC
  - Coordination of student exchange programs through formal agreements reached with numerous higher education institutions in the United States, Mexico and Latin America, Europe, Iceland, Japan, China and Australia.
  - Control mechanism of multiple acceptances for first cycle students
  - Electronic transmission of college academic files to universities for admissions processes
  - Management of agreements relative to study associations with outside institutions which allow students to take courses at another university when the same course is not offered at their own.
  - Inter-university exchange on teaching vacancy notices
  - Centre for special documents in higher education instruction offering professionals in CREPUQ and university personnel a library of over 100000 documents

- Information system where the CREPUQ assumes current management within the framework of a protocol with the ministry for Education
  - on admissions into universities
  - on university personnel
- Exchange programs are negotiated with other organizations similar to CREPUQ, not with individual schools
  - Official program of cotutorship with French universities, created post-signing of Quebec-France general agreement signed by Quebec premier and French prime minister.
    - Allows PhD students to register simultaneously in two universities (one in Quebec, one in France), with two supervisors (one per university), meeting requirements at both universities and spending half the time in each institution.
    - Thesis defense occurs in front of a mixed jury of experts from each school.
    - Earn a double diploma: one from Quebec university and one from French university, both mentioning the other institution involved
    - Co-tutorship model duplicated with other countries (ie. Sherbrooke has one with a Belgian university), but funding is not equivalent if schools are not in France, due to close ties of French language support

Federation of CEGEPs (Fédération des cégeps) is the voice of the forty-eight public colleges in Quebec. The Fédération promotes education at the college level, and more specifically in the general and vocational colleges known as CEGEPs.

Fédération des associations des professeurs des universités du Québec (FAPUQ) was created in 1970. This organization grew out to the new Québécois identity triggered by the societal changes in higher education following the Quiet Revolution, and according to Greg Allain was the central body in the formation of the FQPPU.

Federation of Employees of Public Services (Fédération des employées et employés de services publics (FEESP-CSN)) represents support staff located in the province of Quebec.

The McGill Association of University Teachers (l'Association des Professeur(e)s et Bibliothécaires de McGill ((MAUT - APBM)) was organized at McGIll University in 1951 to increase the involvement of faculty in the governance of the university. Through this involvement, McGill has fostered an atmosphere of academic freedom with improvements have made with regards to working conditions and salaries for teachers and librarians.

Minister of Economic Development, Innovation and Export (Ministère du Développement économique, de l'Innovation et de l'Exportation) Promotes and develops the overall scientific and technological development required in Quebec. This Ministry encourages university research and technology transfer.

Ministry of Education, recreation and Sport (Ministère de l'Éducation, du Loisir et du Sport) directs, promotes and develops postsecondary, college and university education, including scientific research and development.

For a list of past ministers see Ministry of Education, Recreation and Sports (Quebec).

Quebec House of Labour (Centrale des syndicats du Québec (CSQ)) prior to June 2000, this union was known as the Quebec Teachers' House of Labour (Centrale des enseignants du Québec(CEQ)).

The Office of Professions (Office des Professions) is a government agency mandated to protect the public by ensuring that the workers of fifty one professions in Quebec follow the Professional Code. Part of the public protection is done through the regulations of the total students admitted for specific professions; furthermore, the Office of Professions maintains the accreditation standards for professional programs including upgrading and continuing education for practitioners.

The Quebec Federation of University Teachers (Fédération québécoise des professeures et professeurs d'université (FQPPU)) was founded on May 16, 1991. The federation is made up of fifteen unions and it is primarily concerned with the maintenance, defence, promotion and development of the university as a public service including the defence of the right to university access and quality.

== Funding ==
=== Universities ===
In the latter part of 1970s and into the early 1980s serious under funding lead to difficulties in basic financial planning due to the uncertainty in funding policies; therefore, priorities for programs leading to careers and professions and for research and development in the emerging sectors of information technologies were not always easily engaged this time of little growth and financial constraint. In 1979, nine percent of the total cost of post secondary education was collected as student fees. This compares to three percent from gifts and eighty-eight percent from the provincial government. This compares to Ontario's total funding sources, where thirteen percent is from user fees, nine percent from foundation gifts and seventy-eight percent from the provincial government. Currently, McGill University has the third largest endowment of all Canadian educational institutions, approaching $1 billion. Tuition fees vary significantly between in-province, out-of-province and international students, with full-time Quebec students paying around $3,500 per year, other Canadian students paying around $7,500 per year, and international students paying over $15,000 per year.

The budget of Téluq, which is a public agency, is mainly made up of subsidies from the Minister of Education, Recreation and Sport. These subsidies are calculated from the number of students who are registered annually. This is combined with other sources of revenue, and in the 2006- 2007 fiscal year, the budget of $32,912,000 was generated from three sources: seventy- three percent was from subsidies, thirteen percent came from the incomes of education rights, and fourteen percent came from other incomes.

=== Tuition fees ===
==== College ====
In the 2007-2008 fiscal year, tuition fees for Quebec students is free at public CEGEPs unless the student fails five general courses or seven vocational courses. Private colleges assess tuition. Subsidizes for private colleges vary in amount from one institution to another, but is generally between $800 (can.) and $3700 (can.) per semester, depending on the program of studies. International students (non-Canadian) were required to pay between $4010 (can.) and $6125 (can.) per semester, depending on the program of study. At a subsidized private college an international student was charged between $2404 (can.) and $3732 (can.) per semester, depending on the program of studies.

==== University ====
Quebec has the lowest tuition fees in Canada, but only for in-province students. In the 2006-2007 fiscal year, Quebec residents paid $1916 (can.) in tuition for undergraduate programs due to a tuition-freeze that has kept fees at less than half the national average since the 1990s. The tuition freeze was lifted in 2007, bringing fees to $2025 (can.), still less than half the national average in Canada. Graduate fees also remained low at $2137 (can.), on average. In comparison, Canadian graduate students paid $5387 (can.), on average.

===== Differential tuition =====
Residents of Quebec pay less tuition than non-residents of the province. For the 2010-2011 academic year, at Bishop's University in Lennoxville, a Quebec resident will pay 3,145.90 CAD in tuition while a Canadian, non-resident of Quebec will pay 6,836.20 CAD. At Concordia University, Quebec residents paid 72.26 CAD per credit and Canadian non-Quebec residents paid 195.27 CAD per credit in the 2010-2011 fiscal year.

For the academic year 2007-2008, the additional financial contributions required of non-Canadian students enrolled in a university were 306.60 CAD per credit. For students at the undergraduate level studying human and social sciences, geography, education, physical education, administration, humanities and law, and all other disciplines were 348.60 CAD per credit. Students at the graduate level paid an additional 306.60 CAD per credit, while students at the doctoral level paid an additional 269.85 CAD per credit.

As of 1978, Quebec and France are under an agreement allowing French students to study in Quebec under the same price of tuition as Quebec residents.

===== Student financial aid =====
Student financial aid is administered provincially through the Ministry of Education, Leisure and Sport, which has set up conditions for student eligibility for loans and bursaries (grants). A student must be a Canadian citizen or permanent resident, refugee or anybody protected under the Immigration and Refugee Protection Act; must be a Quebec resident or considered a Quebec resident at the time of application; must be admitted or will be admitted to an educational establishment recognized by the Ministry of Education, Leisure and Sport, and studying full-time, or considered to be enrolled full-time. One must not have exceeded the number of months for which financial assistance may be awarded; can not reach the limit of debt set for your education level, academic degree level or program of studies; and must not have sufficient financial resources to continue studies. Students can not be incarcerated. If an individual and their spouse are both students, only one can qualify for full-time status during the same year. Special provisions are available for pregnant students and students with families, which include: a recognition of independence that excludes parental income when calculating eligibility, the living expenses of a dependent child, and if a pregnant student is single the expenses as a household single parent are added to the calculation.

Students with families studying part-time, at least 20 hours per month, may be eligible to receive financial aid normally intended for full-time students; only half of the number of months enrolled part-time are taken into account. There are also special exemptions for single parents, being at least 20 weeks pregnant, caring for dependents under 18 studying full-time, alimony payments, and forbearance while having to take time off related to pregnancy or to care for a new born.

===== Students' protest against tuition fee hike =====
In 2012, the Cabinet of Quebec proposed to raise university tuition fee from $2168 to $3793 between 2012 and 2018. Because of the proposal of tuition fee hike, Quebec's students organized a series of widespread strikes, involving half of Quebec's student population by April 2012. A third of Quebec students continued to participate in the strike by its 100th day. At the end of the strike, the government agreed on the tuition freeze and the students returned to class. In 2013 Quebec Summit on higher education – Government made commitments in the following areas. For instance, there will be a reinvestment, up to a cumulative additional amounts of $1.7 billion by 2018-2019. $1359 million will be targeted to strategic areas defined by the government, such as 50% to selected provincial objectives, including quality of education, improving graduation rates for first generation university students and increasing cooperation between institutions; 25% will be used to support research. Universities and government should negotiate about a better way to absorb the funding cut. And tuition fee will be indexed by 3% in 2013-14.

This students' protest has triggered many debates about higher education in Quebec. Firstly, there was a heated discussion of the possibility of lower accessibility to higher education caused by the higher tuition fees. Especially the students shared the opinion that higher tuition fee would lead to lower accessibility. As the accessibility has been prioritized at such a top concern at Quebec's higher education system since Parent Commission, many citizens and students followed this argument. The second debate was about tax-funded or tuition-funded higher education. Levy, an associate professor working at Mcgill University, argues that a policy of keeping tuition far below the cost of an education can be understood in two different ways: as a transfer from those who do not attend university to those who do, or as a kind of collective loan to students from their future taxpaying selves. He also argues that both ways have problems.

The first one indicates that those who do not attend university pay higher rate, and obviously the higher rate is unfair and regressive; while the second one does not encompass the possibility of migration in and out of the system. The low tuition fee policy has one aim to keep the young and professional francophone at home in Quebec. However, this policy does not include those students who take their cheap education and leave to other provinces or countries for life, and meanwhile in-migrants or those who receive their education elsewhere seemingly overpay the tax. Additionally, as the higher education institutions met many challenges after the funding cut, how to fund the universities as well as how the universities should make good use of funding are discussed.

== See also ==
- List of universities in Canada
- List of colleges in Canada
- List of business schools in Canada
- List of law schools in Canada
- List of Canadian universities by endowment
- Higher education in Canada
- College education in Quebec
- List of colleges in Quebec
- McGill University
- Ministry of Education, Recreation and Sports (Quebec)
- Université Laval
- University of Quebec
- Université de Montréal
