= CEGEP =

Publicly funded colleges in Quebec

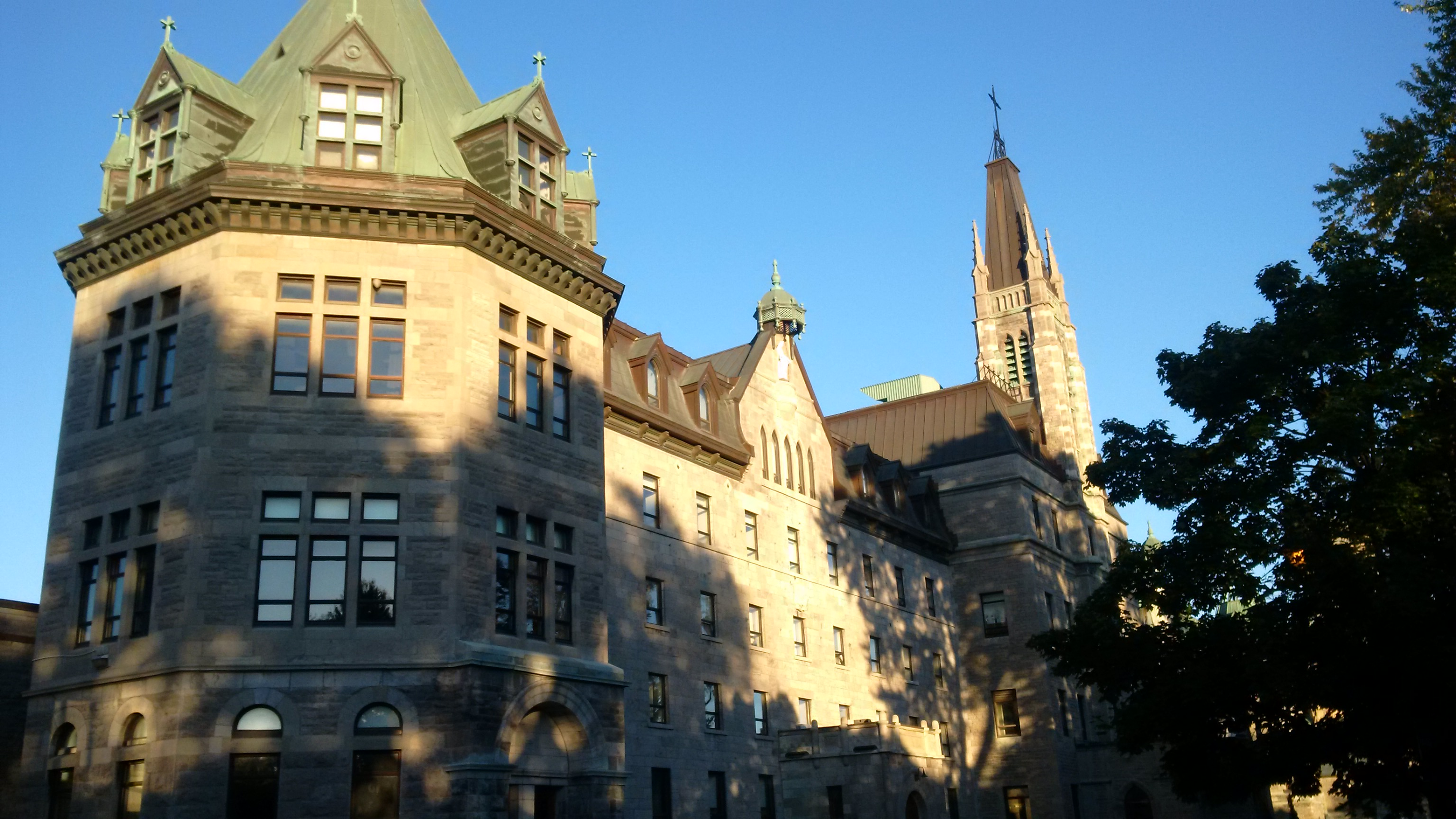
CEGEP of Saint-Laurent, Montreal

A CEGEP (/seɪˈʒɛp/ say-ZHEP or /ˈsiːdʒɛp/ SEE-jep; French: cégep, pronounced [seʒɛp]; also written CÉGEP and cegep) is a publicly funded college providing general, professional, academic or a mix of programs; they are exclusive to the Canadian province of Quebec's education system. A loanword from French, it originates from the French acronym for collège d'enseignement général et professionnel, sometimes known in English as a "General and Professional College"—it is now considered a word in itself.

Although all colleges in Quebec are colloquially referred to as CEGEPs, only public colleges are officially referred to by that name. Both public (CEGEPs) and private colleges have the same function in Quebec. Although they may occasionally be compared to junior colleges or community colleges, CEGEPs differ in that a Diploma of College Studies (or Diplôme d'études collégiales, DEC) is required for university admission in Quebec, unless a student enters as a mature student, which typically means a minimum age of 21, with other requirements. A student in Quebec typically cannot enter university with only a secondary diploma, unless the diploma was earned in another province or country. However, some private English schools in Quebec offer Grade 12 which does allow access to university without needing to earn a DEC (schools in Quebec typically only offer grades 1 through 11).

Professional programs are typically three years in duration, with specialization in courses leading to a career right after graduation. Depending on the university, students with DEC diplomas from a professional program can continue their studies at a university for higher education. Academic programs are typically two years in duration, filling the gap between secondary school and undergraduate degrees, which are both one year shorter in Quebec relative to elsewhere in Canada.

The purpose of a separate collegiate education level is to make post-secondary education more accessible in Quebec. It also ensures that students have a proper academic preparation to succeed at university. There are both public subsidized and private colleges, with the public CEGEPs having little or no tuition fee.

A unique aspect of CEGEP education is that all students must follow mandatory general education courses, together, irrespective of their professional or academic path. These core courses include French, English, Humanities (Philosophy in French CEGEPS), and Physical Education. This common trunk of courses was designed as a rampart against excessive class divisions, and to democratize teaching of literature and philosophy.

An important advantage of the CEGEP system is the ability students have of changing programs without losing too many credits. This ability to try programs without risking losing whole semesters of education allows students to change their minds and switch from an academic career path to a professional one, such as nursing, or mechanical technology, or vice versa.

A product of the Quiet Revolution, the CEGEP system was started in 1967 by the Quebec provincial government and originally consisted of 12 CEGEPs. Today, 48 CEGEPs operate in Quebec, of which five use English as their medium of instruction. There are also College Centres (Centre d'études collégiales), small public post-secondary education colleges very similar to CEGEPs, often secondary stand alone campuses of CÉGEPs, like the Centre d'études collégiales à Chibougamau, part of the Cégep de Saint-Félicien.

== History ==
=== Creation ===
CEGEPs network was created in 1967 under the responsibility of the first Minister of Education Paul Gérin-Lajoie, the Father of CEGEPs. The legislation was proposed following the Parent Report's recommendation criticising the difficult and discriminatory access to higher education and the under-schooling of French-Canadians. Before the reform, 2–3 more years were necessary for French-Canadians to attain university than for English-Canadians. Moreover, urban residents had far greater chance to receive post-secondary education than people living in rural areas, at the time post-secondary education was divided into numerous parallel schools, such as nursing school, normal schools, classical colleges, etc.

CEGEPs were henceforth created in order to harmonise the education system in Quebec. One of the innovations of CEGEPs was the integration of professional and academic programs within the same institution, which was merged from existing schools, and which would be implemented throughout the province. This transitory phase between high school and university, or between high school and the job market, also improves access to university or the job market.

The first 12 CEGEPs opened in September 1967 are (in alphabetical order):

1. CEGEP of Abitibi-Témiscamingue
2. Ahuntsic College
3. CEGEP of Chicoutimi
4. Édouard-Monpetit College
5. CEGEP of Jonquière
6. CEGEP Limoilou
7. Lionel-Groulx College
8. Maisonneuve College
9. CEGEP of Outaouais
10. CEGEP of Rimouski
11. CEGEP of Sainte-Foy
12. Valleyfield College

=== Robillard Reform ===
In 1993, the Robillard Reform launched a revision or programmes of study defined by the Ministry of Education. These programmes were reevaluated according to the expectations of the industry. A committee evaluating college teachers was created.

== Education path ==
Students in Quebec who intend to pursue post-secondary education must attend a college (i.e., CEGEP) before enrolling in a Quebec university. Students who follow a general studies program in Quebec complete six years of primary school (grades 1 through 6), followed by five years of secondary school (called grades 7 through 11 or secondary 1 to secondary 5 in English and 1^{re} secondaire au 5^{e} secondaire in French). Quebec students complete one grade fewer in total than other North American students before beginning post-secondary studies, completing high school at grade 11 instead of grade 12. CEGEP programs are typically two years in length with the exception of certain professional programs that are three years in length; the latter programs are generally for those wishing to enter a profession. Following successful completion of CEGEP, most in-province undergraduate programs are three years in length for Quebec students; hence, the total number of years of study for Quebec students from primary school through a bachelor's degree is the same as for other students in North America. For example, a Quebec student who has completed a CEGEP diploma would begin a 3-year Quebec-based university program in Year 1 whereas an out-of-province student who has completed grade 12 would instead begin the same Quebec-based university program in Year 0. Contrarily, students who possess a CEGEP diploma may also generally attend out-of-province universities in which case diplomas are treated by universities in the same manner as the 2-year college diplomas (associate degree) or are awarded with one year of advanced standing. Some advanced courses at the CEGEP level may be assessed as equivalent to introductory courses at university.

For students intending on completing their post-secondary studies outside of Quebec, there are three options. First, several Quebec-based secondary schools have a specialized curriculum for students who wish to enter directly into out-of-province post-secondary programs. In these instances, students may take one year of courses at high schools that offer this option in order to fulfill the grade 12 requirements of the institution to which they are applying. Second, students may complete one year of CEGEP courses prior to transferring to an out-of-province university so as to begin in the first year of an out-of-province post-secondary degree. For example, students wishing to attend an Ontario university may complete one year of CEGEP and apply as a regular applicant who has completed grade 12 in Ontario. Third, students who have completed two years of CEGEP may apply for admission with one year of advanced standing to post-secondary institutions outside of Quebec.

== Programs ==
Most, but not all colleges offer three types of programs: general, professional and academic. The general programs take three years to complete. The professional programs take three years to complete. The academic programs take two. These programs share a core curriculum, consisting of 14 courses: four first language and two second language courses (either English or French), three Humanities courses (Philosophy in French CEGEPs), three Physical Education courses and two complementary courses (elective courses unrelated to the program of study).

=== Professional program ===
Quebec colleges also offer three-year professional programs for students who wish to pursue a skilled trade. Unlike the academic programs, these are not preparation for university, although this does not prevent a student from attending a university afterwards. The professional programs also lead to a DEC. Examples of such professional programs are Industrial Electronics, Architectural Technology, Nursing, Building Engineering Technology, Computer Science, and Theatre. Though those programs can also lead to the university, they are geared towards immediate employment after completion.

Adult continuing education programs are also offered at colleges. Many of those programs lead to a college certificate (Attestation of College Studies (ACS), (in French): Attestation d'études collégiales—AEC), which is similar to a DEC but does not include the core curriculum. This certificate is delivered by a college's continuing education department, while a diploma is issued by the Ministry of Education, Recreation, and Sport of Quebec (later renamed The Ministry of Education and Higher Education, Ministère de l'Éducation et de l'Enseignement Supérieur in French).

In addition, the majority of the province's thirty-one "Technology Transfer Centres" have been established by CEGEPs. At these centres, applied research is carried out in a specific field in cooperation with industrial partners.

=== Academic program ===
An academic program is two years long. It covers both the subject matter that roughly corresponds to the additional year of high school common elsewhere in Canada and the courses corresponding to those taken in first-year university in preparation for a chosen field in university (Sciences, Humanities, Commerce or Arts). Upon the completion of studies, the provincial government issues a Diploma of College Studies (DCS), or DEC (Diplôme d'études collégiales).

Students are then prepared to complete certain undergraduate programs at a Quebec university in 3 years, as opposed to 4 years outside Quebec. Students with a DEC who choose to attend university in another province in Canada or outside the country are eligible to either skip the first year and enter university as a second year student, or gain advanced standing or extra credit for their first year. The amount of extra credit accepted is at the discretion of each university. In practice, most universities do accept Quebec college credits, but only up to one year, given the difference in structure of education systems between Quebec and the rest of the provinces.

== Language ==
Students can attend either a French-language or English-language CEGEP. There are significantly more French CEGEPs than English ones; only five public colleges (plus a couple of private ones) are in English, with all the remainder being French. The English-language CEGEPs are particularly popular among immigrants and English-speaking Quebecers. As this conflicts with the Quebec government's goal of promoting French language education, it is capping their enrolments. This move has created concerns from the English language education sector that Quebecois will increasingly seek higher education outside the province, with Quebec employers voicing concerns that this will reduce the amount of labour to which they have access. Dawson student union voiced the view that English-language universities in Quebec will become elitist institutions, and that this would not be a positive development.

== See also ==
- College (Quebec)
- Education in Quebec
- Higher education in Quebec
- List of colleges in Quebec
- Lycée, a similar French institution offering three years of instruction
- Ontario Academic Credit, a former similar education level in the Province of Ontario
- R score
- Sixth form college, a British institution that fulfills a similar purpose
