= Quebec Diploma of College Studies =

Diploma awarded in Quebec, Canada

A College Diploma in Quebec for pre-university studies and technical studies (officially titled: Diploma of College Studies, often abbreviated DCS, French: Diplôme d'études collégiales or DEC) is a degree issued by the Ministry of Education and Higher Education after a student has successfully completed an approved college education program. The Quebec education system is slightly different from the rest of North America. One aspect of its distinctness is that it is the only system that requires a college diploma before entering university.

The college diploma was established at the same time as the current college system. There are two types of college diplomas: a two-year pre-university diploma or a three-year vocational training diploma. A Diploma of College Studies is a university prerequisite for Quebec high school graduates, unless applying as a mature student.

A pre-university Diploma of College Studies is roughly equivalent in the rest of North America to a combination of grade twelve and the first year of an Associate's degree, while a three-year vocational is often equivalent to an Associate's.

The professional diploma equivalent to the DEC is the Diploma of Vocational Studies (DEP; diplôme d’études professionnelles), whereas the DEC is for non-trade studies. An Attestation of College Studies (AEC; Attestation d'études collégiales), is awarded following a short-term training program that does not include general education courses.

== See also ==
- Education in Quebec
- High school diploma
- Associate's degree
- Bachelor's degree
