= College education in Quebec =

In the Canadian province of Quebec, college education (informally referred to as just college or as CÉGEP) is the level immediately after high school. It encompasses a range of technical, academic, and vocational education, including some specialized programs. The Quebec education system is unique in North America.

The college level is both a post-secondary education in itself and a separate step required for university admissions. For students graduating from secondary school in Quebec, a college diploma is required for admission into university. In the rest of Canada, colleges have historically been technical schools that offer specialized professional or vocational education in specific employment fields.

== College education ==
Two main college paths are possible.

=== Pre-University ===
Pre-University programs of two years, leading to a college diploma required for university admissions. Quebec high school starts at grade 7 and ends at grade 11, one year earlier than in English North America. Most Quebec university programs are three years in length, with a collegiate level between high school and university bridging the gap:

- English system: 1–8 + 9–12 + 4 University = 16 years
- Quebec system: 1–6 + 7–11 + 2 College + 3 University = 16 years

=== Technical and Vocational ===
Specialized vocational programs of either three years—leading to a college diploma and entry to the job market, with a possibility of university admissions—or one year, leading to a college certificate and direct entry into the workforce.

== Types of colleges ==
There are three types of colleges in Quebec: public colleges, private colleges, and government colleges.

=== Public colleges ===
The majority of college students attend a public General and Vocational College, also known by the term CEGEP (from acronym in French: collège d'enseignement général et professionnel). These colleges do not charge tuition to Quebec residents, although small administrative fees are charged.

=== Private colleges ===
A large number of private colleges also exist at the collegiate level. Some of these schools receive funding from the government, others do not, and therefore tuition can vary greatly between schools.

=== Government colleges ===
There are a small number of collegiate-level government institutions that are not private colleges, yet also not public colleges, as defined under Quebec's General and Vocational College law. One example is the Quebec Music Conservatory.

== See also ==
- Education in Quebec
- Higher education in Quebec
