= List of colleges in Canada =

Colleges in Canada by province or territory

This is a list of colleges in Canada. Colleges are distinct from universities in Canada as they are typically not degree-granting institutions, though some may be enabled by provincial legislation to grant degrees using joint programs with universities or by permission of the provincial Minister of Education.

== Alberta ==
- ABM College of Health and Technology
- Bay River College
- Bow Valley College
- Keyano College
- Lakeland College
- Lethbridge Polytechnic
- MaKami College
- Medicine Hat College
- NorQuest College
- Northern Alberta Institute of Technology
- Northern Lakes College
- Northwestern Polytechnic
- Olds College
- Portage College
- Prairie College
- Red Crow Community College
- Red Deer Polytechnic
- Reeves College
- Robertson College
- Southern Alberta Institute of Technology
- Sundance College

== British Columbia ==
- Acsenda School of Management
- Alexander College
- British Columbia Institute of Technology
- Cambria College
- Camosun College
- Coast Mountain College
- College of New Caledonia
- College of the Rockies
- Columbia College
- Cornerstone International Community College of Canada
- Create Career College
- Douglas College
- Educacentre College (French language institution)
- Eton College, Vancouver
- First College
- Langara College
- North Island College
- Northern Lights College
- Okanagan College
- Selkirk College
- Sprott Shaw College
- Vancouver Community College
- Vancouver Institute of Media Arts (VanArts)

== Manitoba ==
- Assiniboine College
- Booth University College
- Manitoba Institute of Trades and Technology
- Menno Simons College
- Nations College of Canada
- Providence University College and Theological Seminary
- Red River College Polytechnic
- Robertson College
- St. Andrew's College
- St. John's College
- St. Paul's College
- Steinbach Bible College
- Sundance College Winnipeg
- École technique et professionnelle (operated under the Université de Saint-Boniface)
- University College of the North
- Yellowquill University College

== New Brunswick ==
- Collège communautaire du Nouveau-Brunswick
- Maritime College of Forest Technology
- McKenzie College
- New Brunswick College of Craft and Design
- New Brunswick Community College
- Oulton College

== Newfoundland and Labrador ==
- College of the North Atlantic

== Northwest Territories ==
- Aurora College
- Collège nordique francophone

== Nova Scotia ==
- Canadian Coast Guard College
- Gaelic College
- Nova Scotia Community College

== Nunavut ==
- Nunavut Arctic College

== Ontario ==
- Algonquin College
- Cambrian College
- Canadore College
- Centennial College
- Collège Boréal
- Conestoga College
- Confederation College
- Durham College
- Fanshawe College
- Fleming College
- George Brown College
- Georgian College
- Humber College
- La Cité collégiale
- Lambton College
- Loyalist College
- Mohawk College
- Niagara College
- Northern College
- St. Clair College
- St. Lawrence College
- Sault College
- Seneca College
- Sheridan College

== Prince Edward Island ==
- Collège de l'Île
- Holland College

== Quebec ==
=== Public institutions ===
- Cégep André-Laurendeau, LaSalle, Montreal
- Cégep Beauce-Appalaches, Saint-Georges
- Cégep de Baie-Comeau, Baie-Comeau
- Cégep de Chicoutimi, Chicoutimi, Saguenay
- Cégep de Drummondville, Drummondville
- Cégep de Granby-Haute-Yamaska, Granby
- Cégep de Jonquière, Jonquière, Saguenay
- Cégep de la Gaspésie et des Îles, Gaspé
- Cégep de La Pocatière, La Pocatière
- Cégep de l'Abitibi-Témiscamingue, Rouyn-Noranda
- Cégep de Lévis-Lauzon, Lévis
- Cégep de l'Outaouais, Hull, Gatineau
- Cégep de Matane, Matane
- Cégep de Rimouski, Rimouski
- Cégep de Rivière-du-Loup, Rivière-du-Loup
- Cégep de Saint-Félicien, Saint-Félicien
- Cégep de Saint-Hyacinthe, Saint-Hyacinthe
- Cégep de Saint-Jean-sur-Richelieu, Saint-Jean-sur-Richelieu
- Cégep de Saint-Jérôme, Saint-Jérôme
- Cégep de Saint-Laurent, Saint-Laurent, Montreal
- Cégep de Sainte-Foy, Sainte-Foy, Quebec City
- Cégep de Sept-Îles, Sept-Îles
- Cégep de Sherbrooke, 2^{e} arrondissement, Sherbrooke
- Cégep de Sorel-Tracy, Sorel-Tracy
- Cégep de Thetford, Thetford Mines
- Cégep de Trois-Rivières, Trois-Rivières
- Cégep de Victoriaville, Victoriaville
- Cégep du Vieux Montréal, Ville-Marie (Quartier Latin), Montreal
- Cégep Édouard-Montpetit, Vieux-Longueuil, Longueuil
- Cégep Limoilou, Limoilou, Quebec City
- Cégep Marie-Victorin, Rivière-des-Prairies, Montreal
- Cégep régional de Lanaudière
- Champlain Regional College
- Collège Ahuntsic, Ahuntsic, Montreal
- Collège Canada, Montreal
- Collège d'Alma, Alma
- Collège de Bois-de-Boulogne, Cartierville, Montreal
- Collège de Maisonneuve, Hochelaga-Maisonneuve, Montreal
- Collège de Rosemont, Rosemont, Montreal
- Collège de Valleyfield, Salaberry-de-Valleyfield
- Collège François-Xavier-Garneau, La Cité, Quebec City
- Collège Gérald-Godin, Sainte-Geneviève, Montreal
- Collège Lionel-Groulx, Sainte-Thérèse
- Collège Montmorency, Laval
- Collège Shawinigan, Shawinigan
- Dawson College, Westmount, Montreal
- Heritage College, Hull, Gatineau
- Herzing College (Downtown), Montreal
- John Abbott College, Sainte-Anne-de-Bellevue, Montreal
- Vanier College, Saint-Laurent, Montreal

=== Private institutions ===
- Collège André-Grasset, including the Institut Grasset, both located in Montreal
- Collège Bart, Quebec City
- Collège International Marie de France, Montreal
- Collège Jean-de-Brébeuf, Montreal
- Collège Laflèche, Trois-Rivières
- Collège Mérici, Quebec City
- Collège O'Sullivan de Québec
- Collège Stanislas, Outremont
- Collegial Sainte-Anne, related to the Collège Sainte-Anne de Lachine, Montreal
- École de musique Vincent d'Indy, Outremont; named after Vincent d'Indy
- National Circus School, Montreal
- LaSalle College, Montreal
- Marianopolis College, Montreal
- O'Sullivan College of Montreal, Montreal
- Séminaire de Sherbrooke, Sherbrooke
- TAV College, Montreal
- Trebas Institute, Montreal
- M College of Canada, Montreal

== Saskatchewan ==
- Bethany College, Hepburn
- Briercrest College and Seminary, Caronport
- Carlton Trail College, Humboldt
- Horizon College and Seminary, Saskatoon
- College Mathieu, Gravelbourg (French language institution)
- Cumberland College, Nipawin, Tisdale, Melfort and Hudson Bay
- Eston College, Eston
- Great Plains College, various locations
- Lakeland College, Lloydminster
- Nipawin Bible College, Nipawin
- North West College, the Battlefords and Meadow Lake
- Northlands College, La Ronge, Buffalo Narrows and Creighton
- Parkland College, Melville
- St Peter's College, Muenster
- Saskatchewan Indian Institute of Technologies, various
- Saskatchewan Polytechnic, Moose Jaw, Prince Albert, Regina, Saskatoon
- Southeast College, Weyburn
- Western Academy Broadcasting College, Saskatoon

== Yukon ==
- Yukon School of Visual Arts

== Closed ==
=== New Brunswick ===
- Sacré-Cœur College (closed 1915)

== See also ==
- Higher education in Canada
- List of business schools in Canada
- Polytechnics Canada
- Open access in Canada to scholarly communication
