= Higher education in the Northwest Territories =

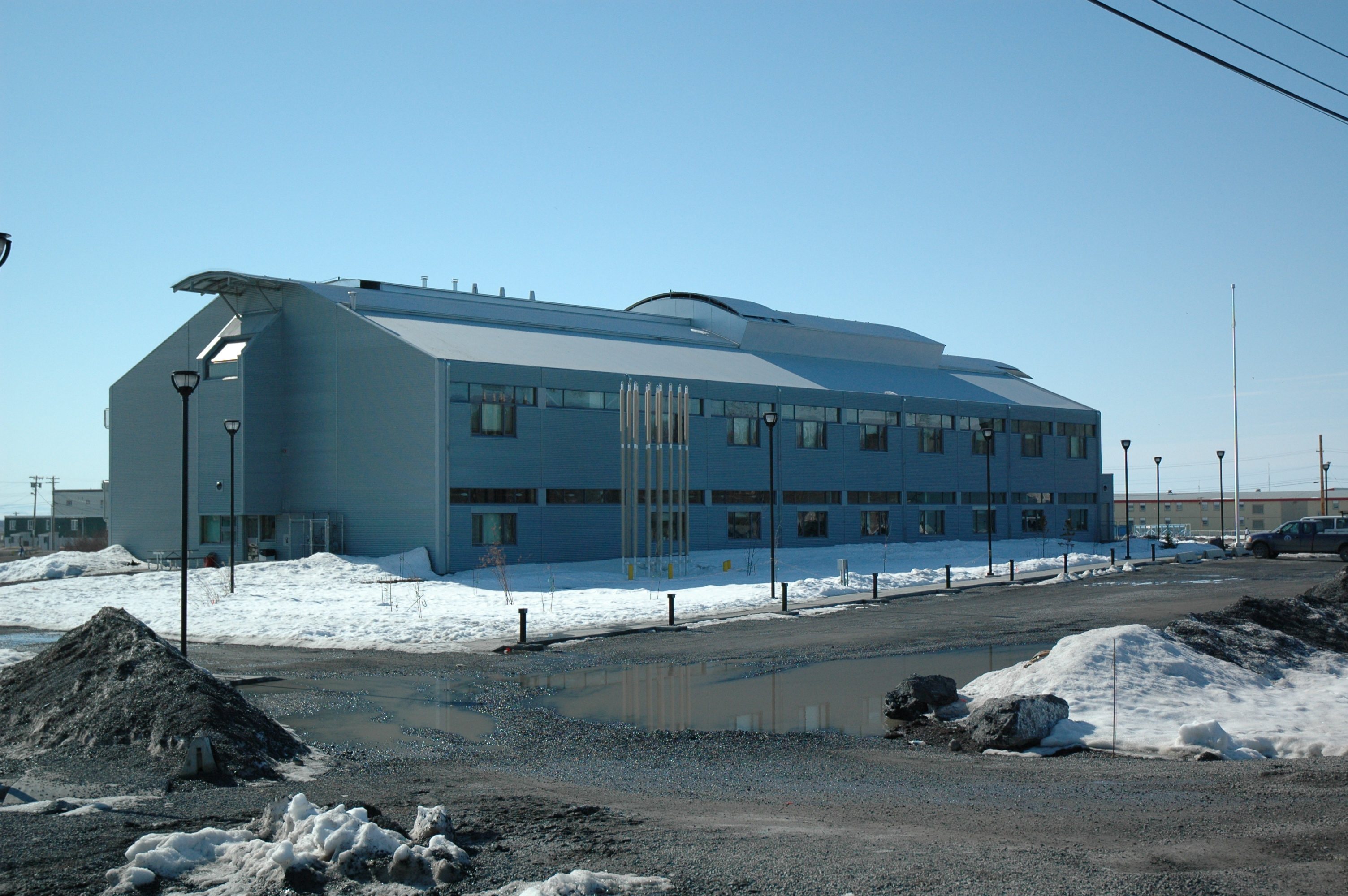
Aurora College, Inuvik campus, Northwest Territories

Northwest Territories

Higher education in the Northwest Territories traces the development and expansion of higher education (also described as post-secondary or tertiary level education) in Canada's Northwest Territories. In Canada, education is a provincial or territorial concern and there is no national regulation nor accrediting body.

There is only one post-secondary institution in the NWT: Aurora College.

The former Arctic College was split into Aurora College and Nunavut Arctic College when Nunavut Territory was created in 1999. Aurora College has campuses in Inuvik, Fort Smith and Yellowknife. It has learning centres in many other communities in the NWT.

There has been an evolution of the land area which comprises the North-West Territories since it was first created in 1870. This article has some chronology of the higher education of the Northwest Territories before the separation of Nunavut in 1999.

== History ==
Up to 1945, the Anglican and Roman Catholic church organizations and missions were mainly responsible for education in the Northwest Territories, with schools and nearby student residences typically being set up in higher populated towns. Starting in 1959, the federal government of Canada began programs that would see it taking more interest and involvement in the Territories' system of education. During the 1960s the government built schools in the communities where indigenous peoples had recently settled and recruited teachers to staff these new schools. By 1969, power over education was officially transferred over to the government of the Northwest Territories under its Department of Education.

In 1969, the Adult Vocational Training Centre (AVTC) was established at Fort Smith. By 1977, it was made responsible for all vocational training in the Northwest Territories. AVTC was officially declared a college by the Northwest Territories Legislative Assembly in 1981 and was renamed Thebacha College.

To institute a model of education that better served the community at large and not just those requiring technical skills, Arctic College was established in 1984 in both Fort Smith and Iqaluit and grew rapidly to consist of campuses across all regions of the NWT. In 1984 the Great Slave Helicopters Flight Training Centre opened by Rodney Wood and Gabe Devenyi, which represented one of the few Yellowknife Career Colleges and Trade Schools. By 1987, it was agreed that community learning centres across the North would join the college system, a process which was completed in 1990.

In 1991, Thomas Wanderlake brought an Academy of Learning College franchise to Yellowknife to offer diplomas in subjects not covered by other institutions and using an educational model that offered flexibility to the lives of Northerners.

In 1995, Arctic College was divided into Aurora College in the Western Arctic, and Nunavut Arctic College in the Eastern Arctic in order to strengthen adult and post-secondary education across the North and focus on meeting community needs. In that same year, The Science Institute of the Northwest Territories, which was established in 1984, was split and merged by the NWT Legislative Assembly into both institutions. In 1999, The Nunavut Act reorganizes the Northwest Territories into two jurisdictions: The Northwest Territories and Nunavut.

In 2001 and 2002, Aurora College implemented four literacy projects with funding from Human Resources and Social Development Canada to support increasing literacy across the territory: Northwest Territories International Adult Literacy and Skills Survey (IALSS) 2002, Family and Community Literacy Development Project, NWT Literacy Council (NWTLC) projects, and WOW!: Wonder of Words Newspaper for At-Risk Youth.

In 2006, 20% or 8292.8 persons had a post secondary education out of the 41,464 residents of the Northwest Territories.

== Structure ==
The territorial Department of Education, Culture and Employment is the government agency responsible for post-secondary education in the Northwest territories. They have recognized 2 post-secondary institutions: Aurora College, which has core public funding, and formerly an Academy of Learning College. A third college, Collège nordique francophone, provides education to French-speaking residents of the Territories.

In addition, Great Slave Helicopters Flight Training Centre applies Global Positioning Systems training for helicopter pilot education.

== See also ==
- List of universities in Canada
- List of colleges in Canada
- List of business schools in Canada
- List of law schools in Canada
- List of Canadian universities by endowment
- Higher education in Canada
