= Robertson College =

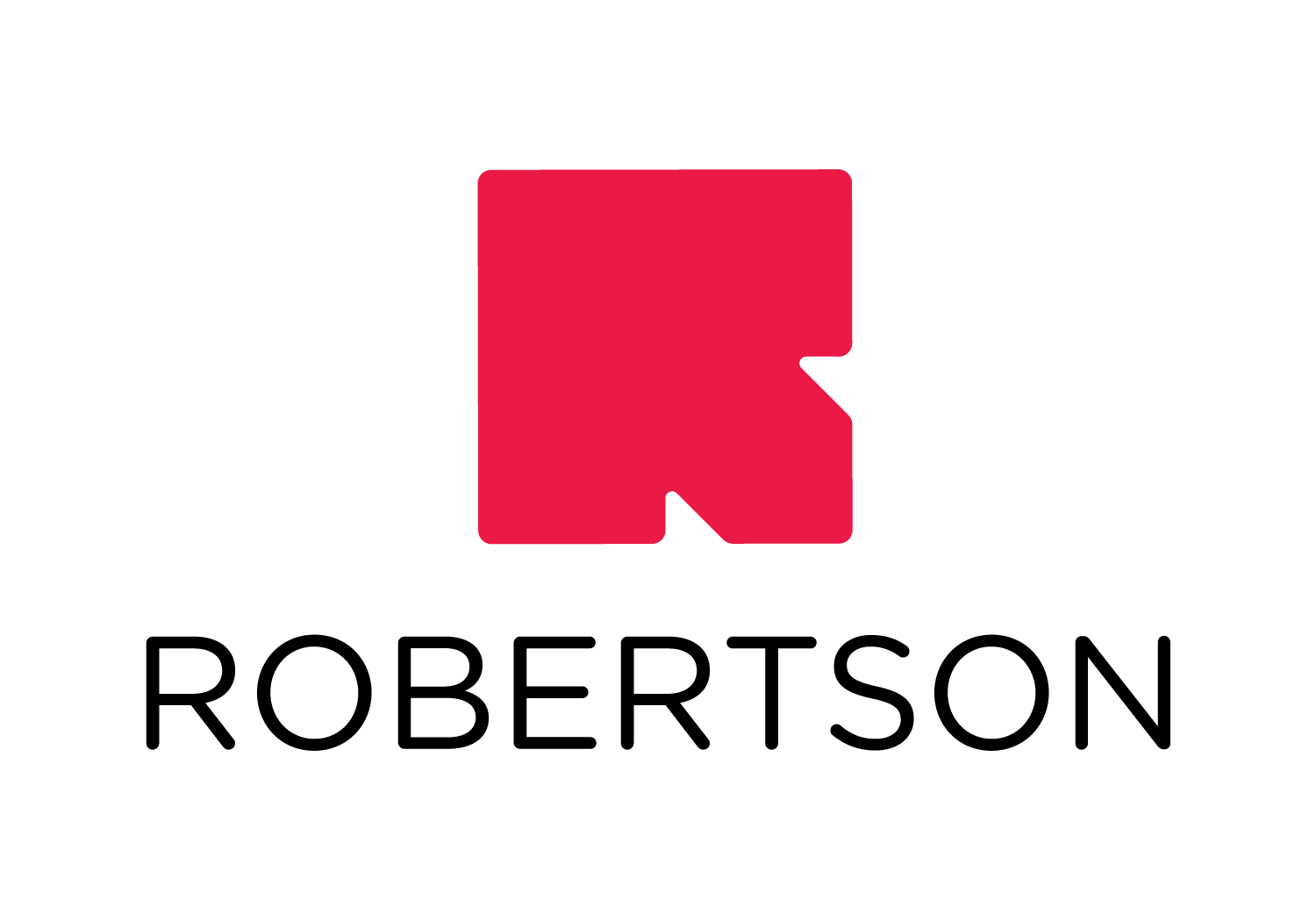
- Type: Private college
- Established: 1911
- Affiliations: ECG Education Canada Group
- President & CEO: William (Bill) Ciprick
- Students: 5,000 (est.)
- Location: 180 Main Street; Winnipeg, Manitoba; R3C 1A6
- Campus: Winnipeg, Edmonton and Calgary
- Website: www.robertsoncollege.com

Robertson College is a private Canadian career training institution headquartered in Winnipeg, Manitoba, Canada. Robertson has campus locations in Winnipeg, Edmonton and Calgary, Alberta. Robertson offers diploma and certificate programs.

== Campuses ==
Robertson College has three physical campuses in Canada, located in Winnipeg, Calgary, and Edmonton. Robertson College also has an online campus which offers much of the same programming.

== History ==
=== Founding ===
Founded in 1911, Robertson College evolved when Mary Irvine Robertson initiated plans to begin a court-reporting business with her sister who was already living in Saskatoon, Saskatchewan. In Edinburgh, Scotland, Mrs. Robertson had worked as a stenographer and reporter in the city hall. She and her young daughter emigrated to Canada in 1912. 1913 saw the start of Mrs. Robertson and her sister's court reporting business, the Dominion Stenographic Service. In 1919, the judicial courts began to hire their own shorthand stenographers which then helped evolve the business into a shorthand school.

By 1921, the Saskatoon Henderson Directory had begun to advertise the business as the Dominion Business College. By 1923, the school was being advertised as the Robertson Shorthand and Secretarial School. In 1986, the business was rebranded to that of the Robertson Career College, establishing additional campuses in Winnipeg, Brandon and Regina. The school, now college, was then taken into a whole new realm of post-secondary technology and education along with updated curricula and expanded program offerings.

In 1990, the college was restructured with the sole campus becoming that of the Winnipeg, Manitoba campus.

=== Robertson today ===
In 1993, the Robertson Career College was formally renamed to its present name, Robertson College as it continued to diversify its program offerings. The college was purchased in 2001 by the Midwestern School of Business and Technology in Winnipeg; it now has since become a multi-campus college with campuses added in Calgary (2004) and in Edmonton. In 2009, an online training division for Robertson College was created. Robertson Online offers flexible learning with an expanding catalog of diploma and certificate programs as well as micro courses.

The College now focuses on Business, Technology, Healthcare and Community Services.

== Affiliations ==
The College is registered as a Private Vocational Institution with the Government of Manitoba as well as the Government of Alberta Advanced Education – Private Career Colleges Branch.

Robertson is also a member of:

- Long Term & Continuing Care Association of Manitoba
- CCAPP (Canadian Council for Accreditation of Pharmacy Programs)
- Massage Therapy Association of Manitoba (MTAM)
- Canadian Council of Massage Therapy Schools
- Canadian Payroll Association (CPA)
- Calgary Chamber of Commerce
- Winnipeg Chamber of Commerce
- Edmonton Chamber of Commerce

== See also ==
- List of colleges in Manitoba
- List of colleges in Alberta
- List of colleges in Ontario
- Private education in Canada
