= Canada college =

Canada college may refer to:

- Cañada College, U.S. community college in Redwood City, California
- Higher education in Canada
  - List of colleges in Canada
