= Higher education in Nunavut =

Territory of Nunavut

Higher education in Nunavut allows residents of this Canadian Arctic territory access to specialized training provided at post-secondary institutions. There are some unique challenges faced by students wishing to pursue advanced training in Nunavut, a vast territory stretching across Arctic Canada from Hudsons Bay to the north pole. The territory was split from the Northwest Territories in 1999, following a successful plebiscite which affirmed Inuit desires to establish an independent political jurisdiction. Covering one-fifth of Canada's area and over 60% of its coastlines, the territory had a population of 31,153 in 2010.

There are no universities in Nunavut. Nunavut Arctic College is the only institution of higher education. It offers a small number of degrees in conjunction with Dalhousie University – Nunavut Nursing Program, University of Regina – Nunavut Teacher Education, University of Prince Edward Island – Master of Education in Leadership and Learning program, and the former Akitsiraq Law Program. Northerners can also receive training in both very basic academic and vocational studies. Due to the distance and lack of connecting roads between communities, the college attempts to operate on the basis that adult education must be delivered in all communities and that the training be tailored to address individual and community needs.

Nunavut and the Canadian North have begun to think about and address the issues of language and quality of education in K to 12 through the creative and demanding Education Act (Nunavut 2008) which strongly supports Inuit languages and culture in the school system. The implementation of this fundamental legislation is propelling an intensive effort to strengthen and improve the quality of primary and secondary education, but also has compelled a closer look at Teacher Education in the College, and the quality and ability of graduates to teach effectively at all levels. The first two terms of the Nunavut government invested very strongly in new schools in Nunavut Communities leading (among other factors) to a steadily increasing number of high school graduates, bringing additional pressures to the College through additional adult learners. The College has struggled to effectively meet this expanding demand for higher quality, diversity, and expanded delivery.

The external dialogue has also accelerated recently with former Governor General Michaëlle Jean speaking in favour of an Arctic University GG advocates for Arctic learning, -Attempts to build an "Arctic University", an alliance of 30 institutions with circumpolar components, located mostly in existing institutions with Arctic research mandates, and - ~ The declaration of the three territorial Premiers (Yukon – Fentie, NWT – Roland, Nunavut – Aariak) who, in a September 2009 Conference Communique "committed to examine options for the development of a northern university" in common.

The Walter and Duncan Gordon Foundation has taken up the issue of post-secondary education in the Canadian North, both through its Arctic Voices Fellowship program and through its commitment to sponsor a 2010 conference among territorial interest groups to address a common institutional design which would enhance post-secondary learning across Canada's northern territories.

== History ==
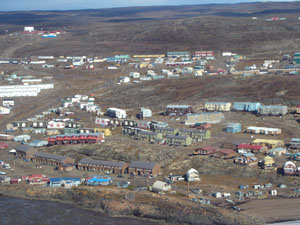
Aerial view of the community of Iqaluit

Although the territory of Nunavut was created in 1999, Nunavut Arctic College (NAC) was created in 1995 through legislation implemented January 1, 1995, when the former Arctic College was split into Aurora College in the Northwest Territories and Nunavut Arctic College in the eastern arctic. Today this early split is seen as an attempt by the dominant western college to retain resources and funding after division and has been seen at the heart of the multi-year struggle of the College to fulfill its mandate, address public perception, despite a number of successful and effective graduates, that instruction and student quality are low and that many students drop out or become perpetual enrollees in an atmosphere where instructors take advantage of weak management and collective bargaining status as "teachers" with school year type holidays and no obligations for research and long term scholarship.

The major campuses of Nunavut Arctic College are Nunatta Campus in Iqaluit on Baffin Island, Kivalliq Campus at Rankin Inlet, and Kitikmeot Campus at Cambridge Bay. The three campuses have very distinct atmospheres and approaches. The College has also established Learning Centres in twenty-four of the twenty-six communities on the territory. Prior to 1999 most campus infrastructure had been built in the western territory, and Nunavut Arctic College is challenged by the growing youth population in Nunavut.

== Governance ==
Higher education in Nunavut is the responsibility of the territorial government, consistent with jurisdictions across Canada. Three main pieces of legislation govern post-secondary education in Nunavut:

- The Education Act, known as Bill 21, governs the education in Nunavut from Kindergarten through to adult learner.
- The Nunavut Act is the federal act that essentially created Nunavut. It has jurisdiction over all public institutes including colleges.
- Public Colleges Act was created through an amendment to the previous Arctic College Act as a result of the creation of Aurora College and Nunavut Arctic College.

== Access ==
For admissions into Nunavut Arctic college, students are required to meet the specific requirements for their chosen program. Programs are not offered at all campuses of Nunavut Arctic College, so interested students are required to submit an application directly to the campus or community centre with the course offering. International and Out of Province Canadians are required to submit applications before April first of each year, and only a limited number of seats are available to these students.

=== Training partnerships ===
Nunavut Arctic College has entered into training partnerships programs for variety community and funding agencies. These programs have aided northern residents in gaining skills needed for enhancing their positions within small business, government and non-governmental organizations. Customized certificates are created specifically for the needs of the community and the organization with the help of public and private sectors. Some examples include: a Community Health Representative Program for the Government of Nunavut's Health and Social Service sector, a Community Lands Administration Certificate for the Nunavut Housing Corporation, and an Inuit Resource Management Certificate for the Nunavut Implementation Training Committee. The Director of Customized Training is a special unit based at the Kivalliq Campus located at Rankin Inlet.

=== Transfer agreements ===
Nunavut Arctic College is a member of the Alberta Council on Admissions and Transfer (ACAT); therefore, the college has formed formal transfer arrangements with Aurora College in the Northwest Territories and many Alberta institutions. Students are advised to refer to the Transfer Guide for information on course eligibility. The college has arranged bulk credit transfer for other Canadian universities including McGill University in Quebec, Royal Roads University in British Columbia, Dalhousie University in Nova Scotia, and the University of Manitoba in Manitoba.

== Funding ==
Financial assistance is available to qualified students in Nunavut through: Human Resources and Social Development Canada (HRSDC), the Financial Assistance for Nunavut Students (FANS), and the various regional Inuit Organizations. A student is responsible to initiate the funding request.

Tuition fees are established by the Minister of Education. In the current (2005–2007) calendar, the tuition fees were set at $1000 per term for full-time students, $200 per course for part-time students and free for senior citizens (defined as a student over the age of sixty).

== Future direction ==
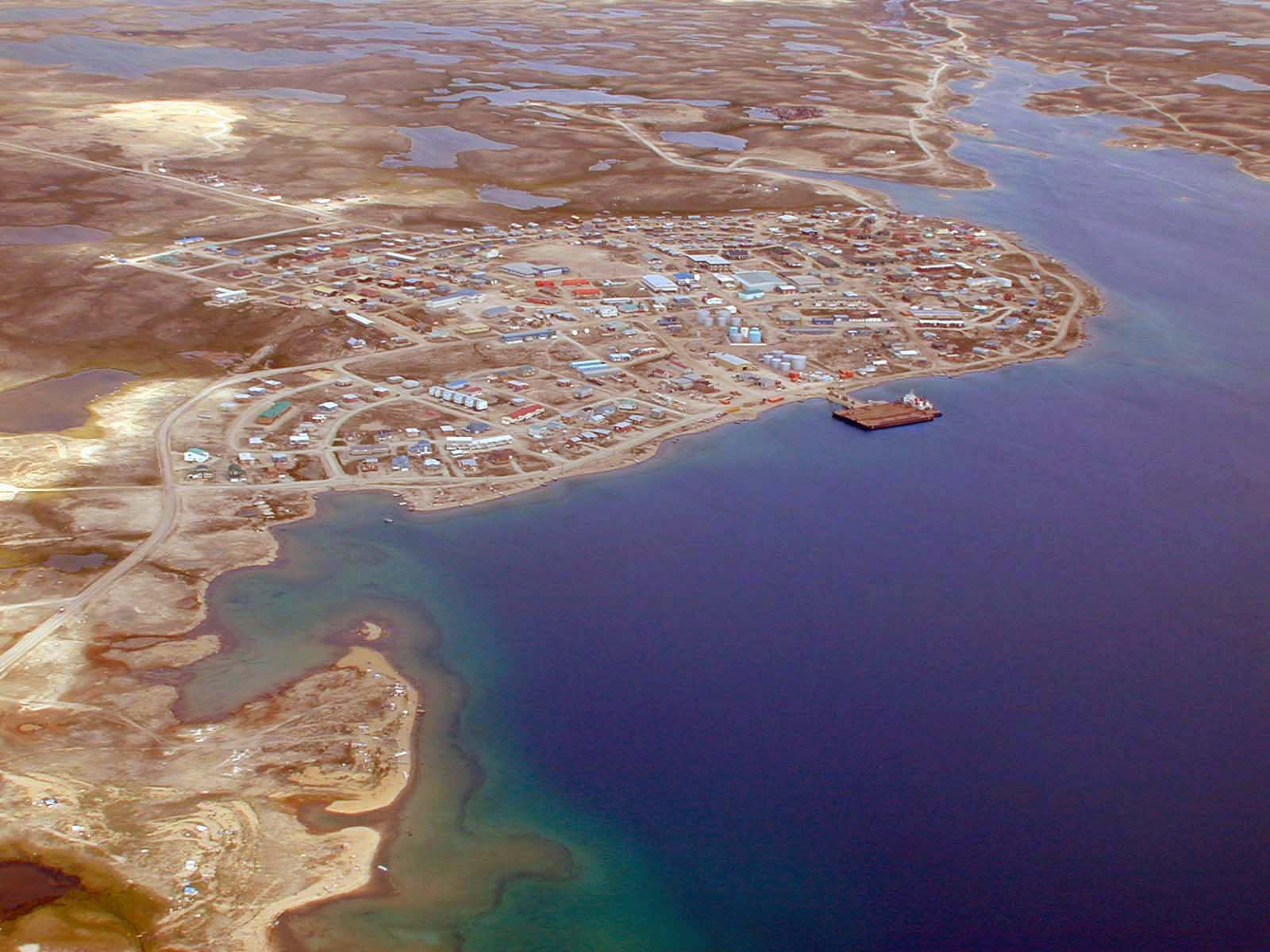
Aerial view of the community of Cambridge Bay

Higher education in Nunavut is in the infancy stage. The Government of Nunavut recognized that higher education is critical for economic and intellectual development; therefore, a strategy was developed to address unique challenges and opportunities found in Canada's north. The Nunavut Adult Learning Strategy completed in March 2006, recommended a five-year strategy to address the needs of the adult learner in Nunavut. This includes career training, literacy, Inuit Qaujimajatuqangit (traditional knowledge), and professional education. The report recommended the restructuring of the Department of Education, changing how vocational and apprentice training are delivered, improving career guidance and development, and the creation of a mature student graduation certificate. Adult literacy is identified a key barrier for employment for Arctic inhabitants, given that Nunavut is a region with skilled and semi-skilled jobs in sectors such as mining, fishing, tourism and government.

The strategy identified the need for additional post-secondary training opportunities for students in Nunavut. However, the practical recommendation that was ultimately made was for Nunavut Arctic College to continue to work with major Canadian universities in order to deliver specialized training. At that time, it was clear that the small population and large geographic expanse did not allow for a free-standing university campus, particularly in a conventional form, until more residents successfully attain a complete K-12 education. Since that time, the concept of a university campus suitable for serving a small population base has evolved somewhat, although the timelines pertaining to potential tangible developments in the future are unclear. Inuit Nunangat University is slated to open in 2030 in Arviat; it is focused on Inuit education.

== See also ==
- List of universities in Canada
- List of colleges in Canada
- List of business schools in Canada
- List of law schools in Canada
- List of Canadian universities by endowment
- Higher education in Canada
