= Carlton Trail College =

Public college in Saskatchewan, Canada

Carlton Trail Regional College
- Type: Public regional college
- Location: Saskatchewan, Canada; 51.6754°N 105.4613°W (Watrous campus)
- Campus: Humboldt Watrous Wynyard
- Website: www.carltontrailcollege.com

Carlton Trail College (known as Carlton Trail Regional College until 2013) is a publicly funded regional college with three campuses in the province of Saskatchewan, Canada, along with classroom sites in other locations in the province. The college provides post-secondary education to predominantly rural and smaller communities north east of Saskatoon. In 2012 the college received $3.8 million in funding from the province of Saskatchewan.

== See also ==
- Higher education in Saskatchewan
- List of colleges in Canada § Saskatchewan
