= North West College (Saskatchewan) =

Public college in North Battleford, Canada

Coordinates: 52.783148°N 108.287315°W

- Motto: Leaders in Building Community
- Type: Public post-secondary Regional College
- Established: 1975
- President: Dr. Eli Ahlquist
- Faculty: 75
- Administrative staff: 60
- Students: 2600
- Undergraduates: available
- Location: 10702 Diefenbaker Dr., N. Battleford, North Battleford, Saskatchewan, Canada
- Campus: Meadow Lake, North Battleford
- Colours: Blue, Green & Yellow
- Website: http://www.northwestcollege.ca/

North West College is one of six regional colleges in the Canadian province of Saskatchewan. There are two primary campuses in Meadow Lake and North Battleford providing post-secondary education in the northwest region of Saskatchewan, Canada. Covering a geographic region of 44,000 km^{2}, North West College is committed to providing the educational opportunities for the rural and First Nation communities served. In 2024-25 North West College offered programming in 23 communities including 12 First Nations.

== Programs ==
North West College provides responsive post-secondary educational options that include academic upgrading through Adult Basic Education, English Language training, GED training and testing, Skilled Trades, Health and Human services, Business along with a variety of other Credit Programs, including undergraduate programs and courses. North West College brokers programs and courses with Lakeland College, Assiniboine College, Saskatchewan Polytechnic, the University of Saskatchewan and the University of Regina.

== See also ==
- Higher education in Saskatchewan
- List of colleges in Canada#Saskatchewan
