= Aurora College =

Northwest Territories college

Coordinates: 68°21′33.00″N 133°43′05.55″W

- Type: Public college
- Established: 1981 (as Thebacha College); 1984 (as Arctic College); 1995 (as Aurora College)
- Affiliations: CCAA, CICan, USports
- Academic affiliations: UArctic
- Chairperson: Kenny Ruptash
- President: Nora Houlahan (Note: Interim president as of 4 May 2026)
- Faculty: 50
- Administrative staff: 200
- Students: 2,915
- Location: 87 Gwich’in Road, Inuvik, NT, X0E 0T0, Inuvik, Northwest Territories, Canada
- Campus: Rural
- Colours: blue & White
- Website: www.auroracollege.nt.ca

Aurora College, formerly Arctic College, is a college located in the Northwest Territories, Canada with campuses in Inuvik, Fort Smith and Yellowknife. It has learning centres in 23 communities in the NWT. The head office for Aurora College is located in Fort Smith.

Aurora College is the only English post-secondary institution in the Northwest Territories.

Aurora College is a member of Colleges and Institutes Canada (CICan). Through its membership with CICan, the institution has signed the Indigenous Education Protocol.

== Programs ==
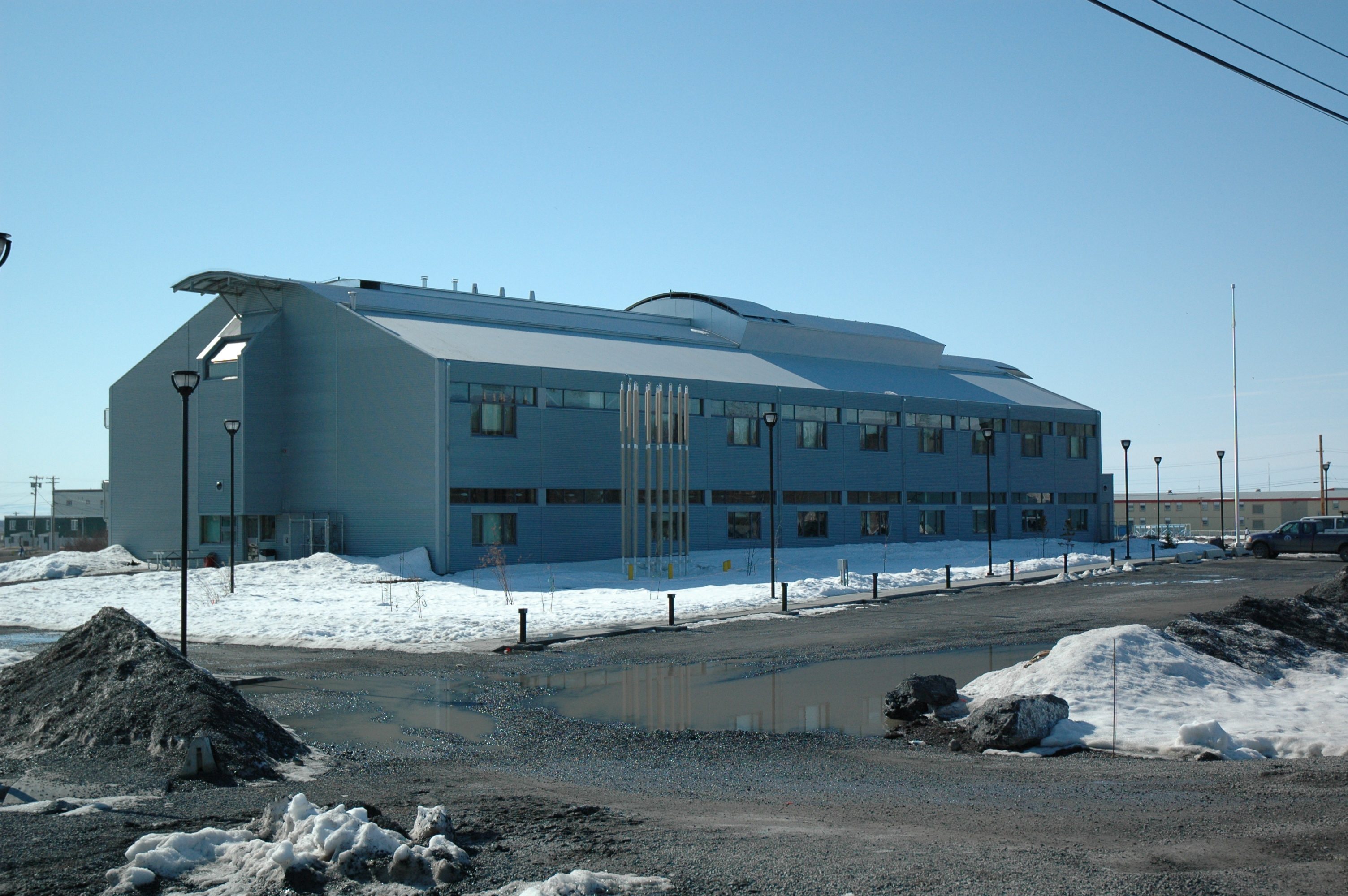
Aurora College campus

Aurora College delivers programs at three campuses, 21 community learning centres and other community sites in the Northwest Territories. Aurora College delivers community-centred post-secondary programs that accurately reflect northern culture and the needs of the northern labour market. Aurora offers several certificate and diploma programs as well as the Bachelor of Education degree program and the Bachelor of Science in nursing program.

== Athletics ==
Aurora College provides intramural sports, such as basketball, volleyball, soccer, badminton and hockey and recreational programs. Before the new Aurora Campus was built the old gymnasium (now torn down) in Inuvik was the largest in the Northwest Territories.

== Residence ==
Aurora College provides a limited supply of accommodation for single students and for those with families.

== Aurora College Community Learning Centres ==
The Aurora College has community learning centres in several communities, which deliver academic upgrading and community-based courses and programs, depending on demand and funding. Community learning centres are located in Aklavik, Deline, Fort Good Hope, Fort McPherson, Ulukhaktok, Norman Wells, Tulita, Tuktoyaktuk, Tsiigehtchic, Fort Providence, Fort Resolution, Fort Simpson, Hay River, Lutselk'e, Fort Liard and Hay River Reserve, Behchoko, Whatì, Gamèti, Wekweeti, and Dettah/N'Dilo.

== Partnerships ==
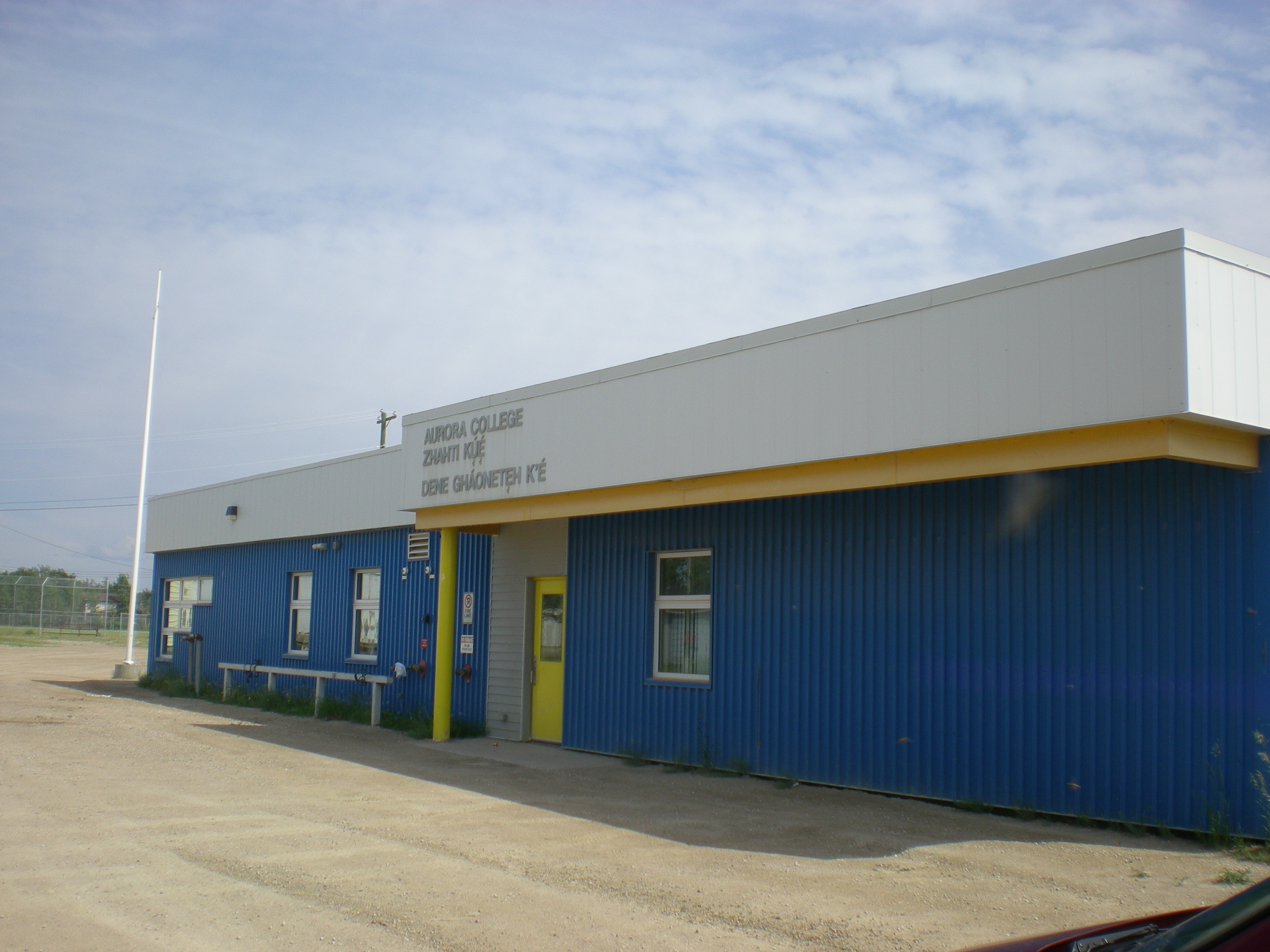
Aurora College in Fort Providence

Aurora programs prepare students for further education through university partners.

Aurora College is an active member of the University of the Arctic. UArctic is an international cooperative network based in the Circumpolar Arctic region, consisting of more than 200 universities, colleges, and other organizations with an interest in promoting education and research in the Arctic region.

Aurora College participates in UArctic’s mobility program north2north. The aim of that program is to enable students of member institutions to study in different parts of the North.

== Scholarships and bursaries ==
The Government of Canada sponsors an Aboriginal Bursaries Search Tool that lists over 680 scholarships, bursaries, and other incentives offered by governments, universities, and industry to support Aboriginal post-secondary participation. Aurora College scholarships for First Nations, Inuit and Métis students include: Gail Marie Jones Scholarship; ATCO Continuous Academic Effort Scholarships; Enbridge Pipelines (NW) Inc. Bursaries; Town of Inuvik Scholarship; Diavik Diamond Mines Inc. Trades and Technology Bursaries; ATCO Developmental Studies Scholarships; ConocoPhillips Scholarship; Aurora Research Institute Awards and Fellowships.

== History ==
In the 1970s, the Adult Vocational Training Centre (AVTC) was established. In 1981, the Adult Vocational Training Centre (AVTC) was declared a college and renamed Thebacha College. In 1984, Arctic College was established with campuses in Fort Smith and Iqaluit. The college grew to include campuses in each region of the Northwest Territories. The mandate was to deliver adult and post-secondary education.

In preparation for Nunavut's establishment as an independent territory, Arctic College was divided on January 1, 1995. Nunavut Arctic College was established to assume responsibility for Arctic College's operations in Nunavut with remaining Arctic College facilities in the western Arctic renamed to Aurora College. The Science Institute of the Northwest Territories was amalgamated with Aurora College in January 1995 and was renamed the Aurora Research Institute.

In 2023, Aurora College paused acceptance of international students after receiving roughly 700 applications. The board chair stated the spike in applications was likely due to foreign recruitment directing applicants seeking to immigrate. He stated the college was for Northerners first, then other Canadians, then International students.

Angela James was named college president in 2024. It was announced the college was putting plans to become a polytechnic university on hold.

== See also ==
- Higher education in the Northwest Territories
- Higher education in Nunavut
- List of colleges in Canada
