= Private education in Canada =

There are a number of private schools in Canada that provide elementary and secondary education, alongside a number of private universities and colleges. The private education network in Canada is managed according to the requirements of the provincial laws applying to private education.

Some private schools are based around a particular philosophy of education, such as Montessori, Waldorf, while others may be related to a particular religious community. Private schools can be independently owned and managed, while others can be regrouped under school groups, that may can operate schools in more than one province, thus having the obligation to abide to particular provincial education laws.

== History ==
=== Secondary education ===
During the formation of Canada there were two opposing regions, the French Lower Canada (FLC) and the British Upper Canada (BUC). Within these regions, two types of schooling systems emerged: the French Catholic system (developed from the French Lower Canada) and the English Protestant system (developed from the British Upper Canada). The FLC schooling system promoted the integration of the French language, culture and Catholicism. They limited advanced education to the clergy and those training for a profession, however most of the schools were funded by the church. On the other hand, the BUC schooling system promoted that they were not affiliated to any specific religion.

Private secondary schools are separate entities from the public education system in the sense that their funding is often based on tuition and private donors. Tuition rates vary by school region and can fluctuate year to year. Private tuition costs have been continuously rising, which can be attributed to the reproduction of classism and educational inequalities in society.

Despite the rising tuition costs, private education provides a multitude of benefits such as smaller class sizes, additional support (gifted, special needs, etc.) as well as prioritized interpersonal relationships.

Upper Canada College (UCC) is one of the best known private secondary schools in Canada. Tuition ranges from $31,000- $62,000, making UCC one of the most expensive yet prestigious private schools in Canada.

=== Post-secondary education ===
An important distinction within technical colleges in Canada lies in the accreditation of some of these schools for the Canada Student Loans Program, which applies in several provinces (except for Quebec, Northwest Territories, and Nunavut). The accreditation of a technical college affects the amount that can be granted to a student through the Canada Student Loan Program.

The influence of some American ideas of education is shown within the private education network in Canada, as the recent opening of a liberal arts university shows (Quest University), and to the creation of education groups alike some education groups in the United States, along with the presence of American education groups in Canada—for instance, the one owning the Everest Colleges in Ontario. Some education groups limit their activities to a single scope—like technical training, for instance, or within a single province—while others lead more diversified activities, such as general education, technical training and even university education. School transactions between education groups might happen. More than one education group is active on the international level. The National Association of Career Colleges regroups only a small part of private career colleges in Canada.

== Types of private schools ==
=== Charter schools ===
There are 13 charter schools and 23 charter school campuses in Canada, all located in Alberta. They have been operating in the province's education system since 1994. Charter schools maintain some level of self-governance, but do not have complete control as they are publicly funded and tuition free. They received the name "Charter School" as they follow a charter that has rules and goals for the students to accomplish, and they deliver education in a specialized way which is thought to enhance student learning.

=== Faith-based schools ===
There are many types of faith-based schools in Canada, including Anglican, Baptist, Christian, Catholic, Jewish, and Islamic schools. Within these faith-based schools, there are single-sex schools and co-ed schools. Prior to the 1900s, single-sex faith-based schools were more common as schools were catered towards boys. The first (continuously operating) independent day and boarding school for girls in Canada was founded in 1867, and is called the Bishop Strachan School.

=== Independent schools ===
Independent schools, also known as "private schools" or "designated colleges", typically provide primary education (kindergarten to grade 12) to students. Some may provide vocational and trades training. They are independently funded and run and therefore operate under their own rules and bylaws. They maintain their own governance structures which ensures that the institutions are sustained.

== See also ==
- Canadian Accredited Independent Schools
- Education in Canada
- List of Canada-accredited schools abroad
- Student loans in Canada
