= Inuit Nunangat University =

Future university in Nunavut, Canada

Coordinates: 61.1048°N 94.0420°W

- Type: Public
- Established: 2030; 4 years' time
- Administrative staff: 80
- Students: 100 (approx.)
- Location: Arviat, Nunavut, Canada
- Campus: Rural

Inuit Nunangat University is a proposed public university in the Canadian territory of Nunavut. The university's main campus will be based in Arviat, although the institution plans to open "regional knowledge centres" or "satellite campuses" in the Northwest Territories and Quebec. Once opened, the institution will be the second university based in northern Canada (after Yukon University) and the first dedicated to Inuit students and education. It will also be the second post-secondary institution in the territory, after Nunavut Arctic College.

== Founding ==
The university's name comes from Inuit Nunangat, which refers to the homeland of the Inuit in Canada. The 2025 Canadian federal budget allocated $50 million CAD towards the establishment of the university, with other contributions from the Mastercard Foundation, Inuit Tapiriit Kanatami, and Nunavut Tunngavik Incorporated. It has been publicly backed by the Inuit officials, the federal government, the Nunavut government, and Nunavut MP Lori Idlout.

== Plans ==
On February 11, 2026, it was announced that Arviat had won the bid to host the main campus of Inuit Nunangat University, to be opened in 2030. It will educate approximately 100 students and have 80 staff members. The university plans to open "satellite campuses", potentially in Inuvik, Northwest Territories, Iqaluit, Nunavut, Cambridge Bay, Nunavut, Kuujjuaq, Quebec, and Puvirnituq, Quebec. The university plans to offer four bachelor's degrees and other developmental education. Student housing will also be constructed on the campus.

== See also ==
- Higher education in Nunavut
- List of universities in Canada
