= Aurora Research Institute =

Research centre in Inuvik, NWT, Canada

Coordinates: 68.35606°N 133.72011°W

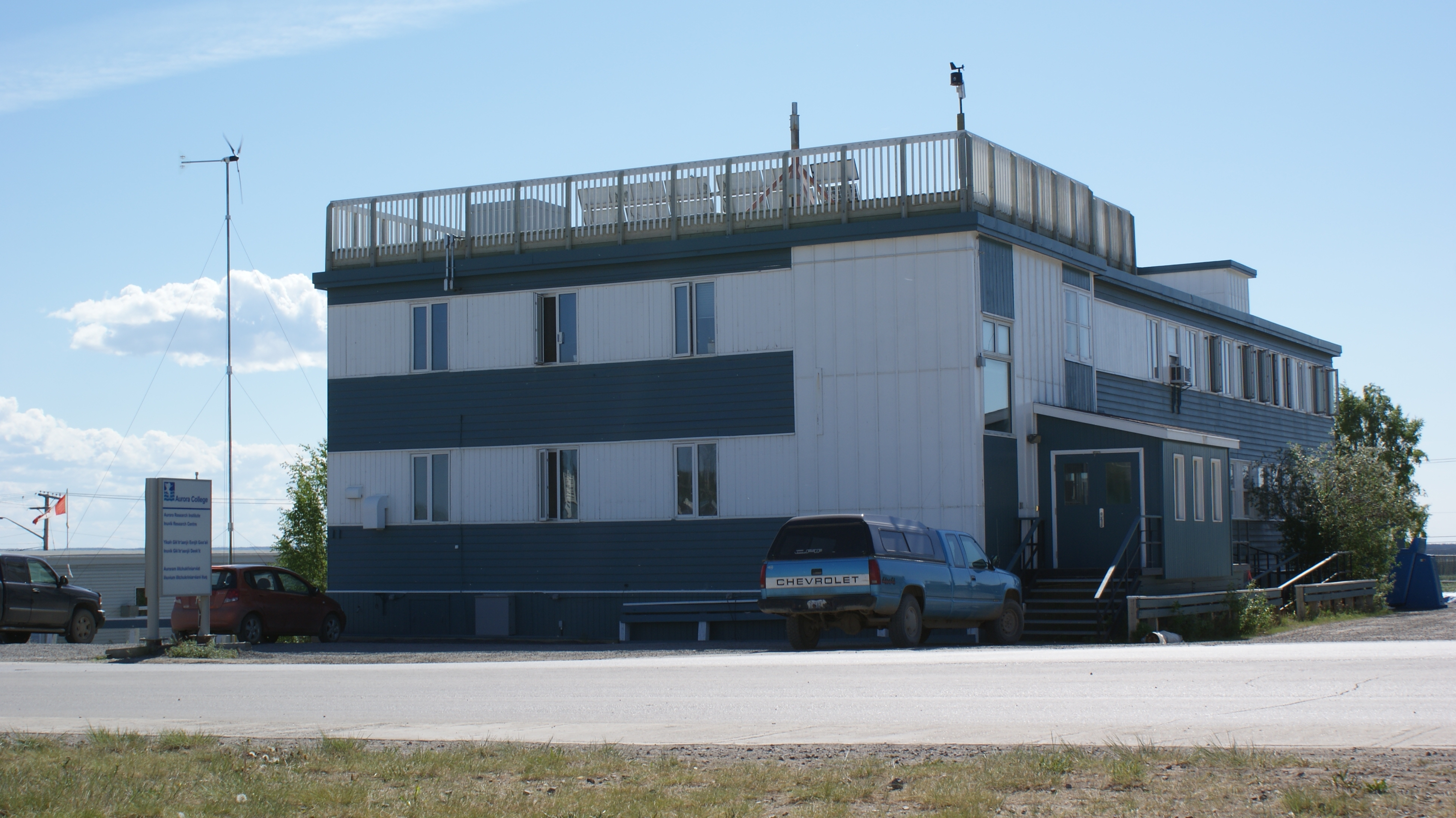
Aurora Research Institute in Inuvik.

Aurora Research Institute, formerly Science Institute of the NWT, is a research centre in the Northwest Territories, Canada. It is part of Aurora College, with offices in Inuvik, Yellowknife and Fort Smith.

Aurora Research Institute offers licensing and research assistance in the Northwest Territories. The institute provides logistical support in the form of laboratory facilities, office space, storage, accommodation and equipment rentals for visiting researchers and promotes science in northern schools. Licensing under the Northwest Territories Scientists Act is handled by the Aurora Research Institute.

== Mission ==
Aurora Research Institute promotes communication between researchers and the people of the land in which they work. Increasing public awareness of the importance of science, technology and indigenous knowledge is a key goal.

== History ==
The Science Institute of the Northwest Territories was created by the Legislative Assembly of the Northwest Territories in 1984. In 1995, the Science Institute of the Northwest Territories divided and was merged with Arctic College in Nunavut and Aurora College in the Northwest Territories.
