= 2025 Canadian federal budget =

2025 budget of the Canadian federal government
- Submitted to: House of Commons
- Presented: November 4, 2025
- Passed: November 17, 2025
- Country: Canada
- Parliament: 45th
- Party: Liberal
- Finance minister: François-Philippe Champagne
- Total revenue: TBA
- Total expenditures: CA$486.9 billion (projected)
- Deficit: CA$78.3 billion (projected)
- GDP: TBA
- Website: Budget 2025

The 2025 Canadian federal budget for the fiscal years of 2025–26, known as Budget 2025, was presented to the House of Commons by Finance Minister François-Philippe Champagne on November 4, 2025. The budget's slogan is "Canada Strong" which was also the Liberal Party's slogan in the 2025 federal election. This was the first budget presented under the premiership of Mark Carney, the 30th Canadian Ministry, and Champagne as finance minister. It was passed by the House on November 17.

== Background ==
In the 2025 Canadian federal election, the incumbent Liberal party, led by Prime Minister Mark Carney, won a plurality of seats but failed to win enough seats to gain a parliamentary majority, continuing their six-year tenure as a minority government and marking the third consecutive term of a Liberal minority government. Carney, described as fiscally conservative, announced an increase in defence spending, a reduction in the public service, and tax cuts, among others. On September 17, Champagne confirmed November 4 as the date of the budget. Carney gave a pre-budget speech at the University of Ottawa in October, stating that "we won’t transform our economy easily or in a few months — it will take some sacrifices and some time". This is the first budget to occur under the 2025 United States trade war with Canada and Mexico, and the first under a new capital budgeting framework. Operational spending will be distinguished from capital expenditures, and the budgeting cycle will be revised with a budget tabled in autumn, and an economic statement released in the spring. The budget also used British English rather than Canadian English.

== Measures ==
- Decreases the size of the civil service by about 40,000 positions, with funding previously used for the civil service to go towards "nation-building" projects. Additionally, the government aims to be more efficient by spending less.
- Reaching the 2% of GDP NATO target for military spending by 2026, with an aim for 5% by 2035.
- Erect a trade diversification fund and "double overseas exports within a decade".
- The budget allocates $925.6 million over the next five years to bolster Canada's artificial intelligence and $334.3 million to quantum computing services. The budget also proposes to fund Statistics Canada over six years to assess businesses' use of AI services. Other government departments such as Transport Canada and the Department of Justice will utilise AI.
- Boosts funding to broadcasters, including boosting CBC/Radio-Canada funding by $150 million. Funding is provided to investigate Canada's potential participation in the Eurovision Song Contest.
- The government will eliminate taxes on under-utilized housing, luxury jets priced over $100,000 and boats priced over $250,000.
- The budget emphasizes the enhancement of carbon capture and storage technologies so that an emissions cap for the oil and gas sectors is no longer required.
- The budget proposes to cut temporary immigration from 673,650 in 2025 to 385,000 in 2026. Permanent immigration will stay relatively stable at 380,000 from 2026, compared to 395,000 in 2025. The government also plans to recognize more vocational qualifications and launch a policy to attract foreign researchers to Canada. A one-year programme to accelerate pathways to permanent residency for 33,000 temporary immigrant workers will be implemented.
- The budget proposes to accelerate the construction of a high-speed rail line. The budget has $214 million for critical mineral–related projects. The government also proposes to invest in new infrastructure projects including housing, roads, water services and healthcare facilities through the creation of a new Build Communities Strong Fund (BCSF) programme which will provide $51 billion in funding over ten years, with $5 billion being dedicated toward health infrastructure as part of a new Health Infrastructure Fund within the BCSF.
- The budget includes a tax deduction for productivity-related capital investments; including a tax break for manufacturing-related purposes such as Liquefied natural gas (LNG) equipment.
- The budget projects operational spending will be balanced with revenue within three years.
- The budget decreases the Canada Student Grant (CSG).
- The budget allocates $50 million to establish Inuit Nunangat University in Nunavut.
- The budget cuts funding for the "2 billion trees" program and the Canada Greener Homes Grant.

== Reactions ==
Conservative Party leader Pierre Poilievre strongly criticized the budget, stating that the party would not vote for it. The Bloc Québécois committed to not supporting it, while Green Party leader Elizabeth May voted in support despite initially stating that she was against the budget. NDP interim leader Don Davies stated NDP MPs would consider voting in its favour, or abstaining. Following the budget bill's tabling, Conservative MP Chris d'Entremont left the party and joined the Liberal caucus, making the government just two votes shy of a majority.

=== Vote ===
On November 17, the budget passed, with all Liberals (except the Speaker) and May voting in favour. Conservative MP Matt Jeneroux, who announced his intention to resign as an MP following the budget's tabling, voted to abstain. 2 NDP MPs also voted to abstain, and another Conservative was absent, with all other Conservatives and NDP MPs voting against the budget, along with the Bloc.

=== Public opinion ===
Polling conducted by Abacus Data following that budget's release found that 52% of Canadians believed the budget was a step in the right direction compared to 48% who believed it was a step in the wrong direction. Abacus Data and Kolosowski Strategies measured support for individual budget measures, finding majority support for "Buy Canadian" procurement, reduced temporary resident numbers, increased military spending and reductions in the civil service, while finding majority opposition to the deficit, increases to the industrial carbon tax and elimination of the luxury tax.

== Legislative history ==
House of Commons vote on the Ways and Means Motion, No. 2
Party	Total	Yea	Nay	Abstention	Absent
Liberals	170	169		1 (Note: Francis Scarpaleggia (speaker))	
Conservatives	143		141	1 (Note: Matt Jeneroux)	1 (Note: Shannon Stubbs)
Bloc Québécois	22		22		
New Democratic	7		5	2 (Note: Lori Idlout and Gord Johns)	
Green	1	1			
Total	343	170	168	4	1
