= Cégep à distance =

Coordinates: 45.5572°N 73.5817°W

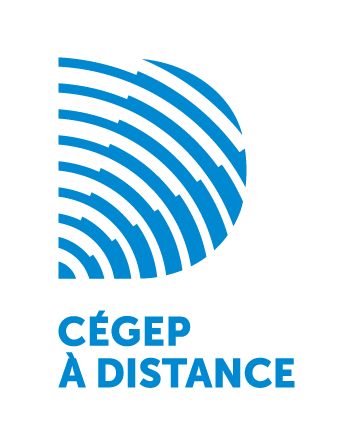
- Former name: Centre collégial de formation à distance (CCFD)
- Type: Public
- Established: 1991
- Parent institution: Cégep de Rosemont
- Director: Carole Gaudin
- Students: 17,000
- Location: 6300, 16e avenue Montreal, Quebec, Canada; H1W 2S9
- Language: English, French
- Website: http://cegepadistance.ca

Cégep à distance is a distance-education CEGEP that offers services which are complementary to those offered by the CEGEP network. It welcomes a diverse student body, many of whom come from the CEGEP network.

== History ==
Cégep à distance was created in 1991 by the Cégep de Rosemont which had been mandated by the Ministère de l'Éducation to develop a distance education CEGEP. Initially known as the Centre collégial de formation à distance, Cégep à distance adopted its new name in 2002. In 2005, the ministry entrusted it with the mandate to develop distance education for the English-speaking community. Since 2023, Cégep à distance's English course selection is only available to visiting students with an authorization to study (commandite) from their college.

== Mandate ==
The main function of Cégep à distance is to offer through distance education college-level studies programs that lead to a diploma of collegial studies (DCS/DEC) or to an attestation of collegial studies (ACS/AEC), both inside and outside Québec.

As part of that mandate, Cégep à distance may also fulfils the following functions:

- Design and produce distance-education materials.
- Conduct studies and research on distance education.
- Promote partnership and dialogue with the CEGEPs.
- Promote and develop distance education.
- Develop courses and services in English.

== Client groups ==
Cégep à distance accepts two types of clients:

1. Admitted students enrol directly at Cégep à distance. These are students who come to Cégep à distance to...
  - Take general education courses (common to all DCSs/DECs) or complementary courses to complete a DCS/DEC
  - Earn prerequisites needed to enter university
  - Earn a DCS/DEC or ACS/AEC to access the job market or make a career change
2. Visiting students with a signed authorization form (commonly referred to as a commandite) from their college to study at Cégep à distance. Their CEGEP issues a commandite so they can enrol simultaneously at Cégep à distance, usually because one of their courses causes a scheduling conflict or because it is not offered in the current session at their home CEGEP. Cégep à distance works with the other CEGEPs to help their students in their educational pathway and allow them to graduate sooner.

== A few facts and figures ==
In 2025–2026, approximately 26,000 students enrolled, accounting for more than 46,000 course registrations.
