= O'Sullivan College =

Private college in Montreal, Quebec, Canada

Coordinates: 45.4972415°N 73.5736895°W

Collège O'Sullivan de Montréal inc.
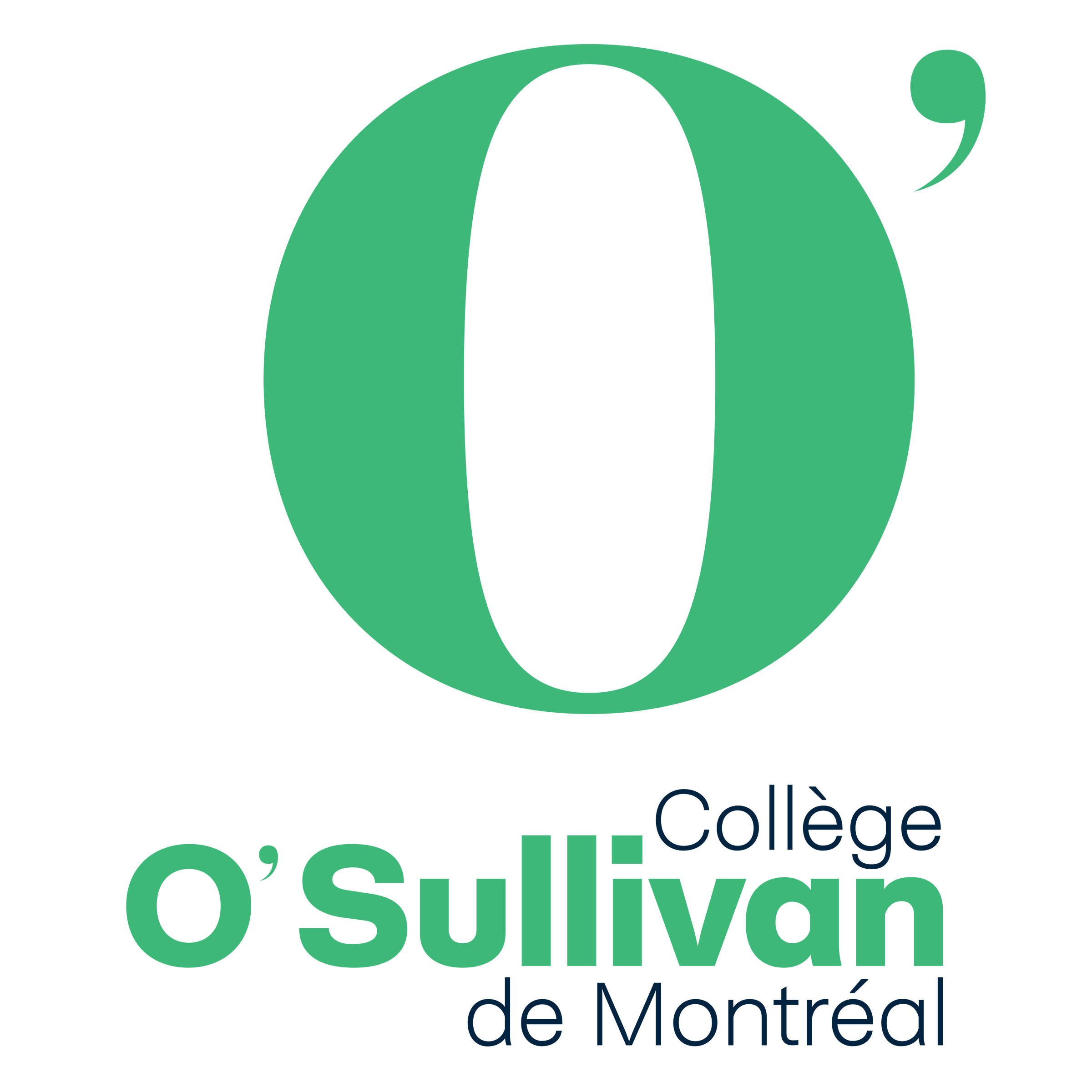
- Type: Private College
- Established: 1916
- Location: Montreal, Quebec, Canada
- Website: https://osullivan.edu/en/

Collège O'Sullivan de Montréal inc. is a small bilingual private college that was founded in 1916. It is located at 1191 Mountain Street (rue de la Montagne) in downtown Montreal.

The college offers programs granting both Attestation of Collegial Studies (ACS) and Diploma of Collegial Studies (DCS).

== Programs ==
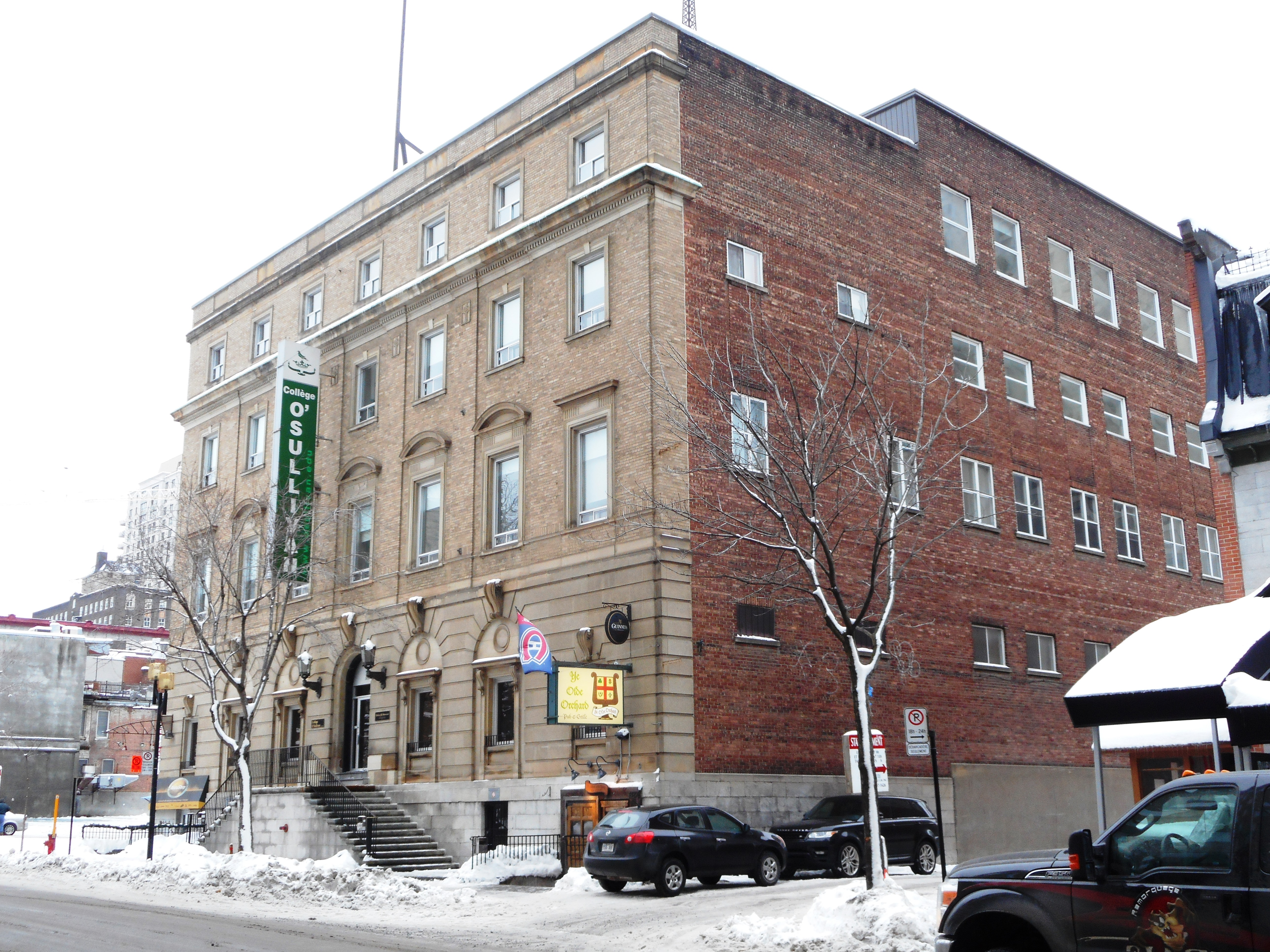
1191, Rue de la Montagne, Montréal, QC H3G 1Z2

=== DCS ===
- Paralegal Technology - 3 years
- Accelerated Paralegal Technology - 2 ½ years
- Computer Science Technology - 3 years
- Medical Records (offered in French only) - 3 years
- Administration and management techniques - 3 years

=== ACS (offered in French only) ===
- Web marketing strategies for social networks - 8 months
- Paralegal Technology - 18 months
- Media Technology and Film Sets - 1 year
- Network Management and IT Security - 12 months
- Office Systems Technology Legal Specialization (offered in French only) - 8 intensive months
- Production Coordinatior WEB, Cinema and TV - 8 months
- Production Assistant - 8 months
