= Cégep de Matane =

Public college in Matane, Quebec

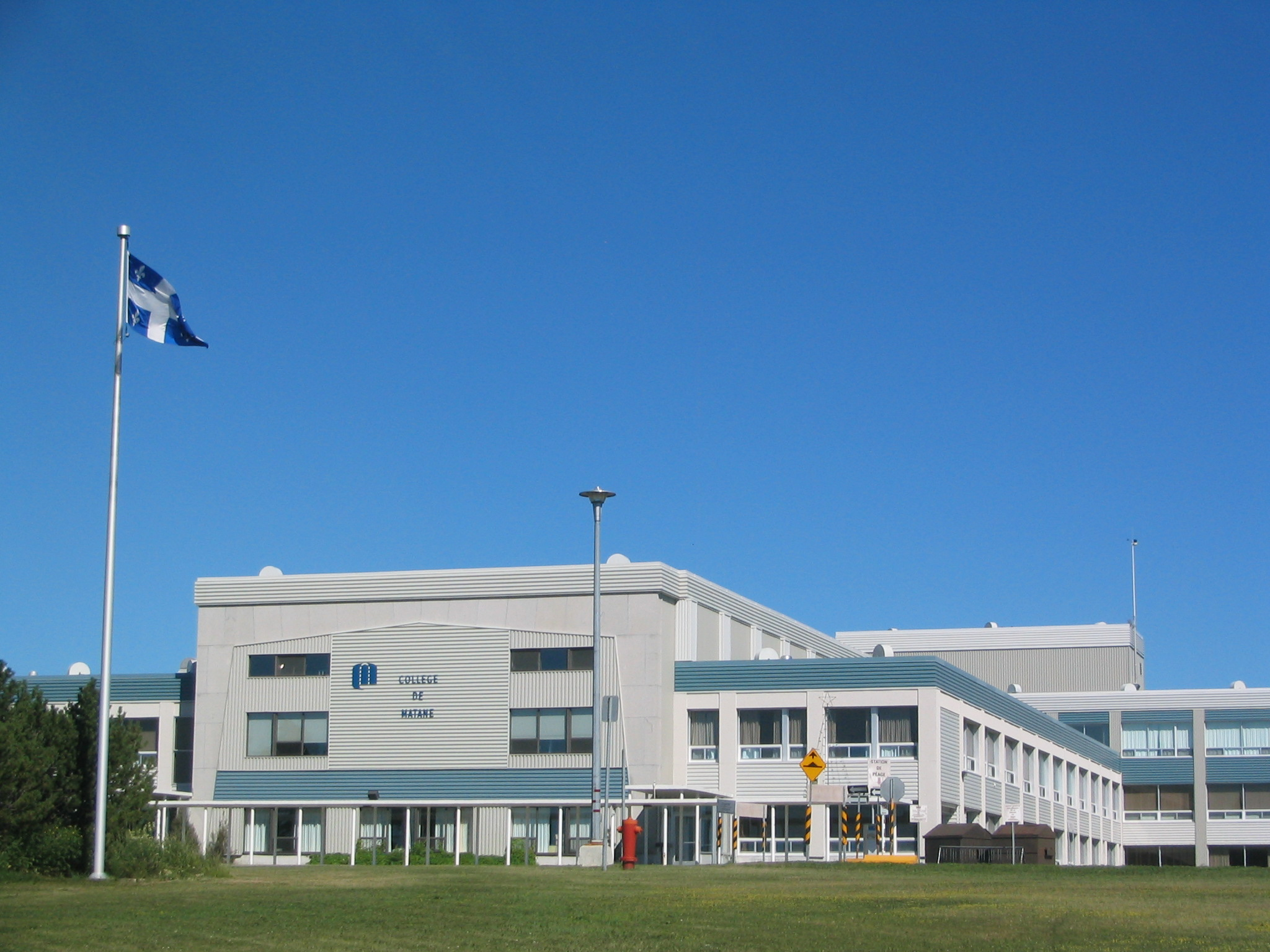
- Motto: Partagez nos passions!
- Motto in English: Share our passions!
- Type: Public CEGEP
- Affiliations: non-denominational
- Academic affiliations: ACCC
- Location: 616 Avenue Saint Redempteur, Matane, Quebec, Canada; 48.8409°N 67.4974°W
- Campus: Urban waterfront
- Colours: Blue
- Sporting affiliations: CCAA
- Website: www.cegep-matane.qc.ca

Cégep de Matane is a francophone CEGEP pre-university and technical college located at 616 Saint-Rédempteur in Matane, Quebec, Canada.

== Partnerships ==
The College of General and Vocational Education is affiliated with the ACCC, and CCAA.

== History ==
In 1967, several institutions were merged and became public ones, when the Quebec system of CEGEPs was created.

== Programs ==
The CEGEP offers two types of programs: pre-university and technical. The pre-university programs, which take two years to complete, cover the subject matters which roughly correspond to the additional year of high school given elsewhere in Canada in preparation for a chosen field in university. The technical programs, which take three-years to complete, applies to students who wish to pursue a skill trade. In addition Continuing education and services to business are provided.

- Programmes préuniversitaires
  - Sciences de la nature
  - Sciences humaines
  - Arts et lettres
- Programmes techniques
  - Gestion et exploitation d'entreprise agricole
  - Soins infirmiers
  - Technologie de l'électronique industrielle;
  - Techniques d'aménagement et d'urbanisme; de l'administration; de l'informatique; de tourisme; de photographie; d'animation 3D et de synthèse d'images; d'intégration multimédia
  - Formation générale

== See also ==
- List of colleges in Quebec
- Higher education in Quebec
