= ABM College =

Canadian college in Calgary, Alberta, and North York, Ontario

ABM College of Business and Technology Inc.
- ABM College
- Type: Private
- Established: 2011
- President: Mohammed Baten
- Administrative staff: 80
- Address: 112 - 28 Street SE, #200, Calgary, Alberta, Canada; 51.05218°N 113.99288°W
- Colours: Red, white
- Website: https://www.abmcollege.com/
- Full Contact Information

ABM College is a private Canadian career college with main campuses in Calgary, Alberta, North York, Ontario, Winnipeg, Manitoba, as well as online programs.

== Programs ==
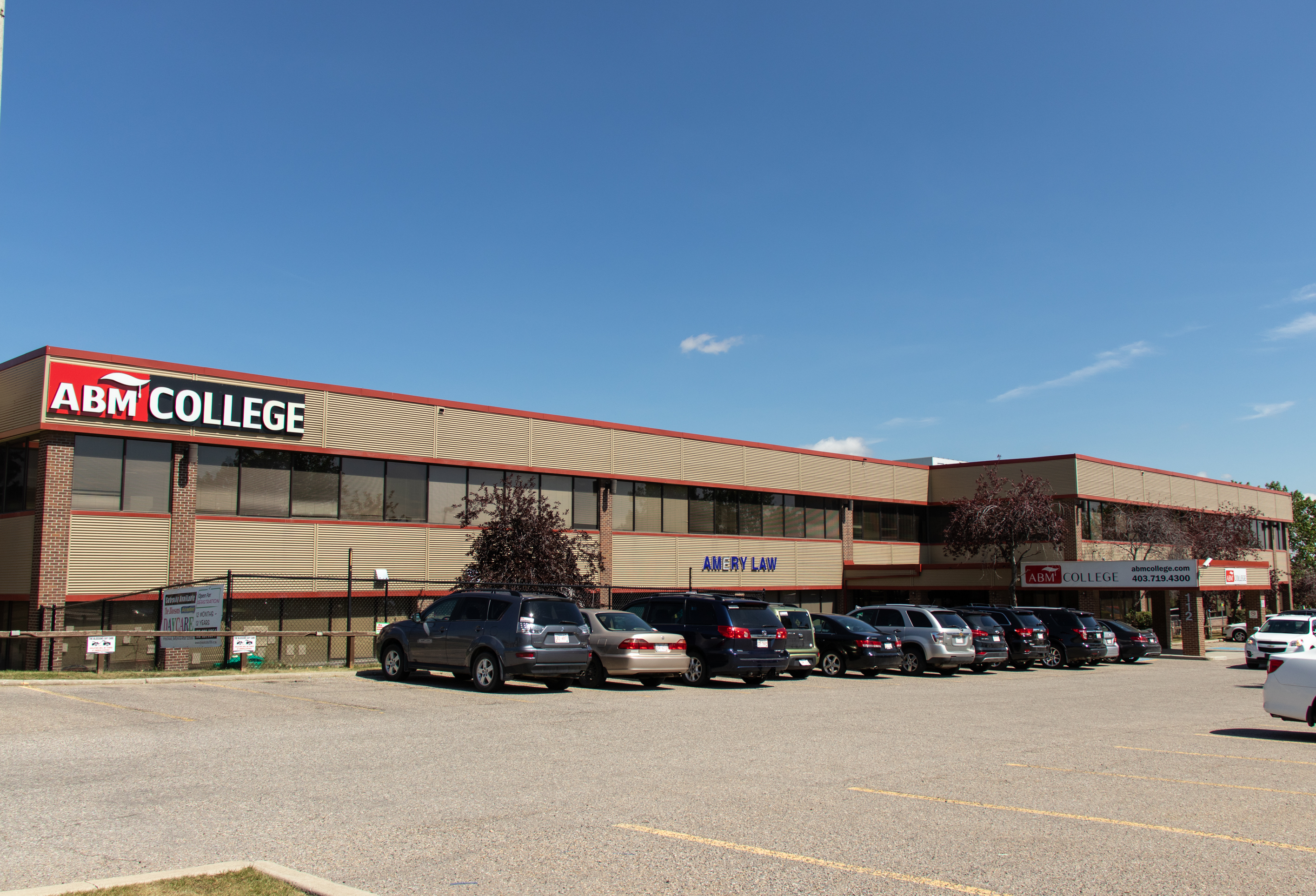
External shot of the ABM College Calgary campus building

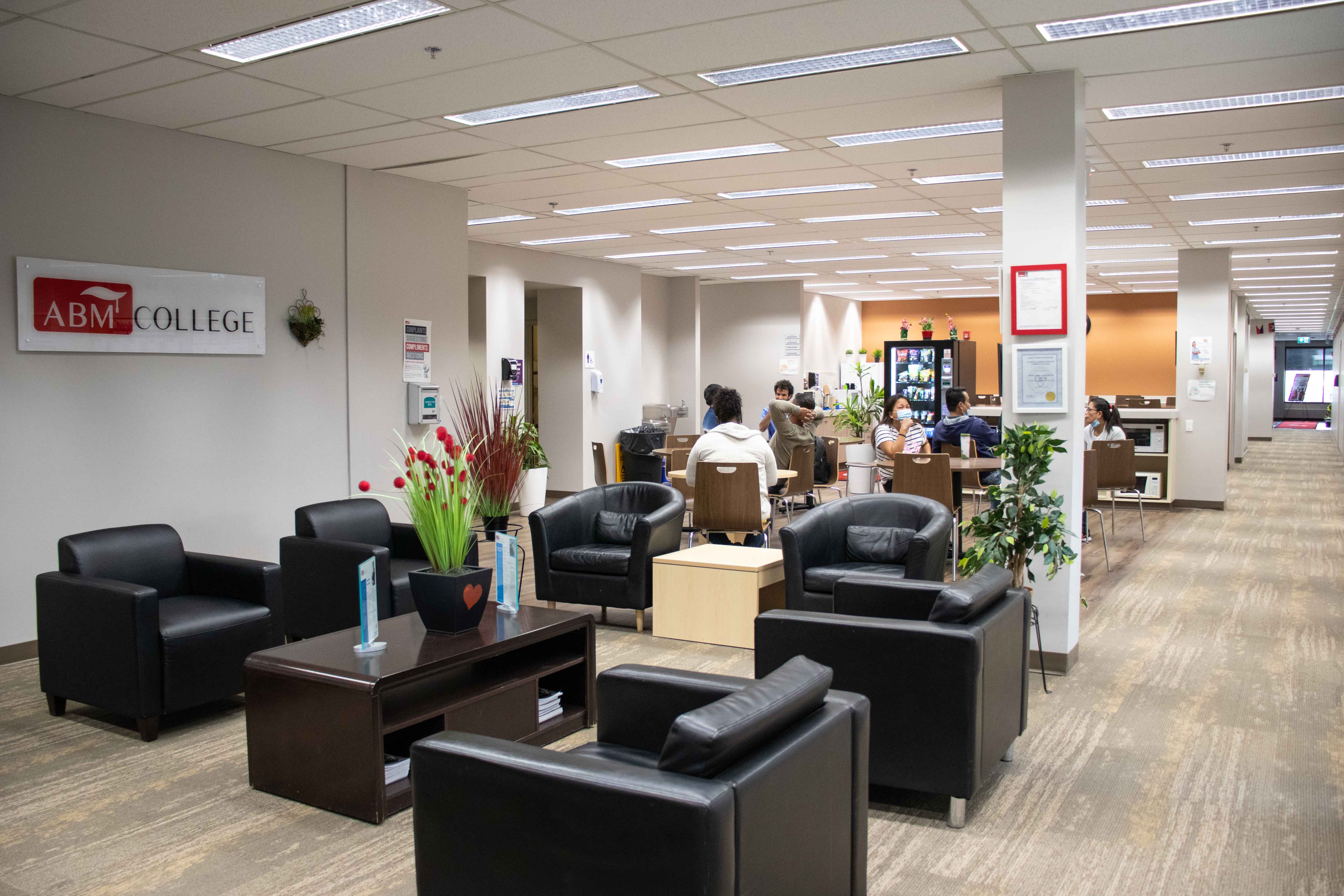
ABM College Calgary campus student lounge area

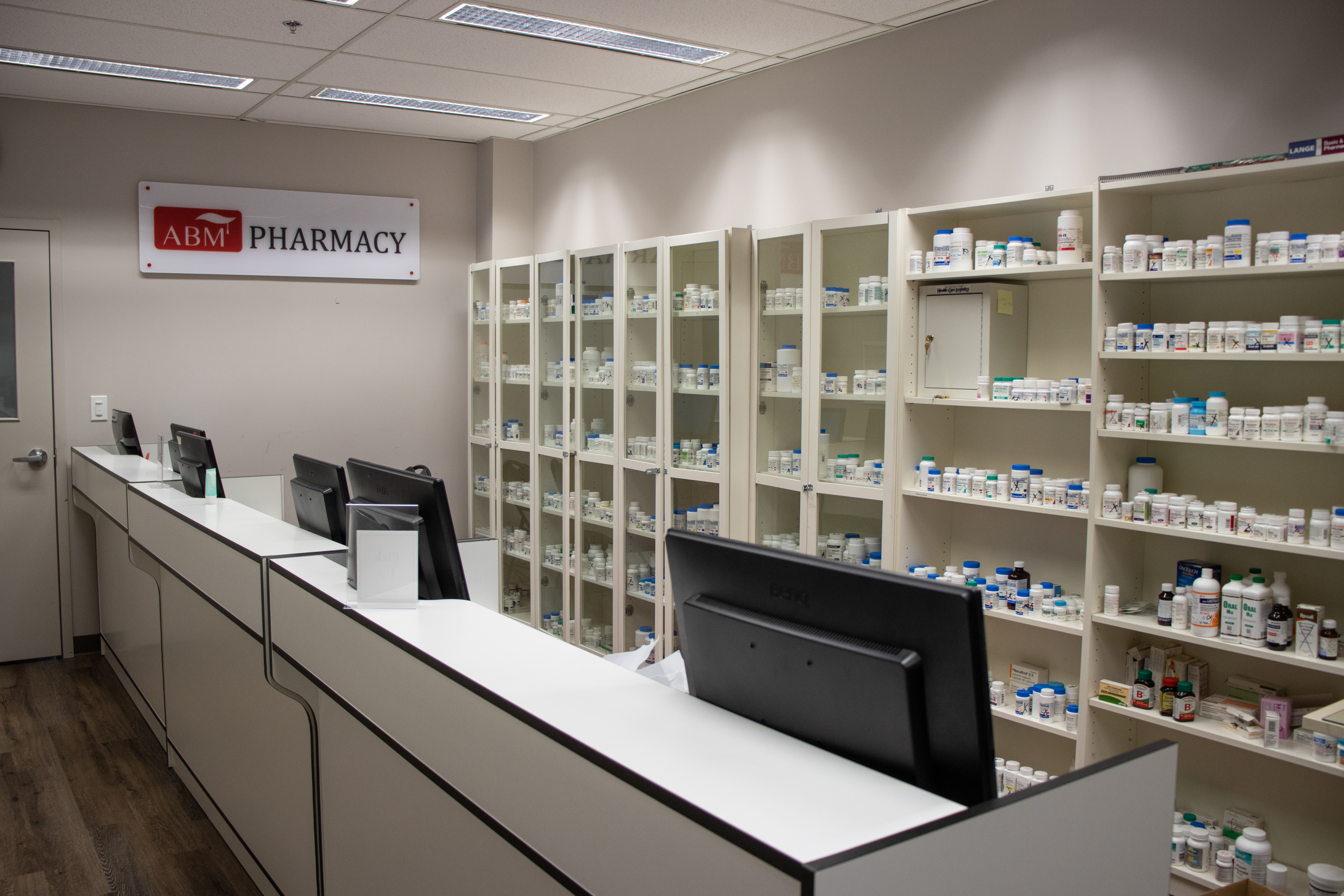
ABM College Pharmacy Assistant Lab

ABM College offers programs in health care, business, and technology. It has the authority to grant certificates and diplomas. ABM College programs are licensed by Alberta Advanced Education. The college offers in-person, online, and hybrid programs with year-round monthly intakes and various day, evening, and weekend schedules.

=== Toronto Campus ===
Health:

- Dental Office Administration Diploma,
- Addictions and Community Service Worker Diploma,
- Medical Office Assistant and Unit Clerk Diploma,
- Personal Support Worker Certificate

Business:

- Financial Planner Diploma,
- Human Resources Administration Diploma,
- Accounting and Payroll Administration Diploma,
- Business Administration Diploma,
- NACC Early Childhood Assistant Diploma

Technology

- UI/UX Design Diploma,
- Cybersecurity Diploma,
- Web Design and Development Diploma,
- Graphic Design Diploma,
- Network Administrator Diploma

=== Calgary Campus ===
Health:

- Health Care Aide Certificate,
- Medical Office Assistant & Unit Clerk Diploma,
- Massage Therapy & Advanced Massage Therapy Diploma,
- Pharmacy Assistant Diploma,
- Addictions & Community Support Worker Diploma,
- First Aid & CPR (training course),

Business:

- Business Administration Diploma,
- Accounting & Payroll Administration Diploma,
- Administrative Assistant Diploma,
- Education Assistant Diploma,
- Legal Assistant Diploma,
- Digital Marketing Diploma

Technology:

- Graphic Design Diploma,
- Mobile Application Developer Diploma,
- Network Administrator Diploma,
- Web Design & Development Diploma,
- Help Desk Analyst Diploma

=== Winnipeg Campus ===
Technology:

- Web Design & Development Diploma,
- Cybersecurity Diploma

== See also ==
- Education in Alberta
- List of colleges in Alberta
- List of universities and colleges in Alberta
