= Bay River College =

College in Alberta, Canada

- Type: Private
- Established: 2014
- President: Arshad Mahmood
- Administrative staff: 30
- Location: Calgary, Alberta, Canada; 51.085545°N 113.997081°W^{a}
- Colours: Blue, Light Blue
- Website: https://bayrivercolleges.ca
- ^{a}Coordinates of Calgary campus

Bay River College (formerly Evergreen College Calgary) is a Canadian private career college located in Calgary, Alberta, Canada. The college is a member of the Alberta Association of Career Colleges and the National Association of Career Colleges. Bay River College is a Designated Learning Institute (DLI) in Alberta, Canada: #O121321694207. Founded in 2014 as Evergreen College Calgary, the institute was rebranded as Bay River College in 2018. The college specializes in one- and two-year programs in technology, business and management, health care, social work, clinical research (post-graduated), environmental sciences and continuous studies with a focus on workplace placement and “real work” experience.

== Programs ==
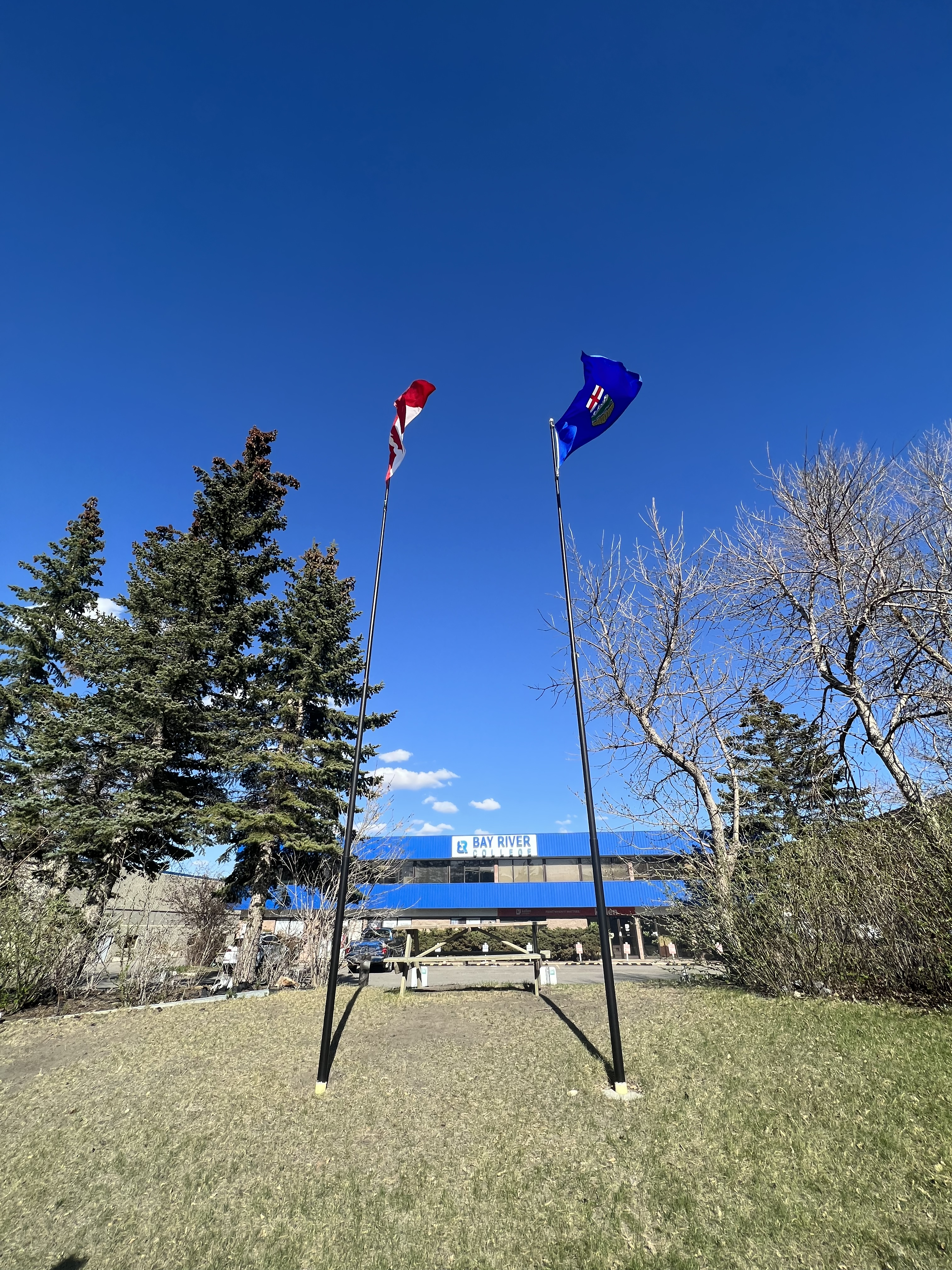
Bay River College's Calgary campus - 2023

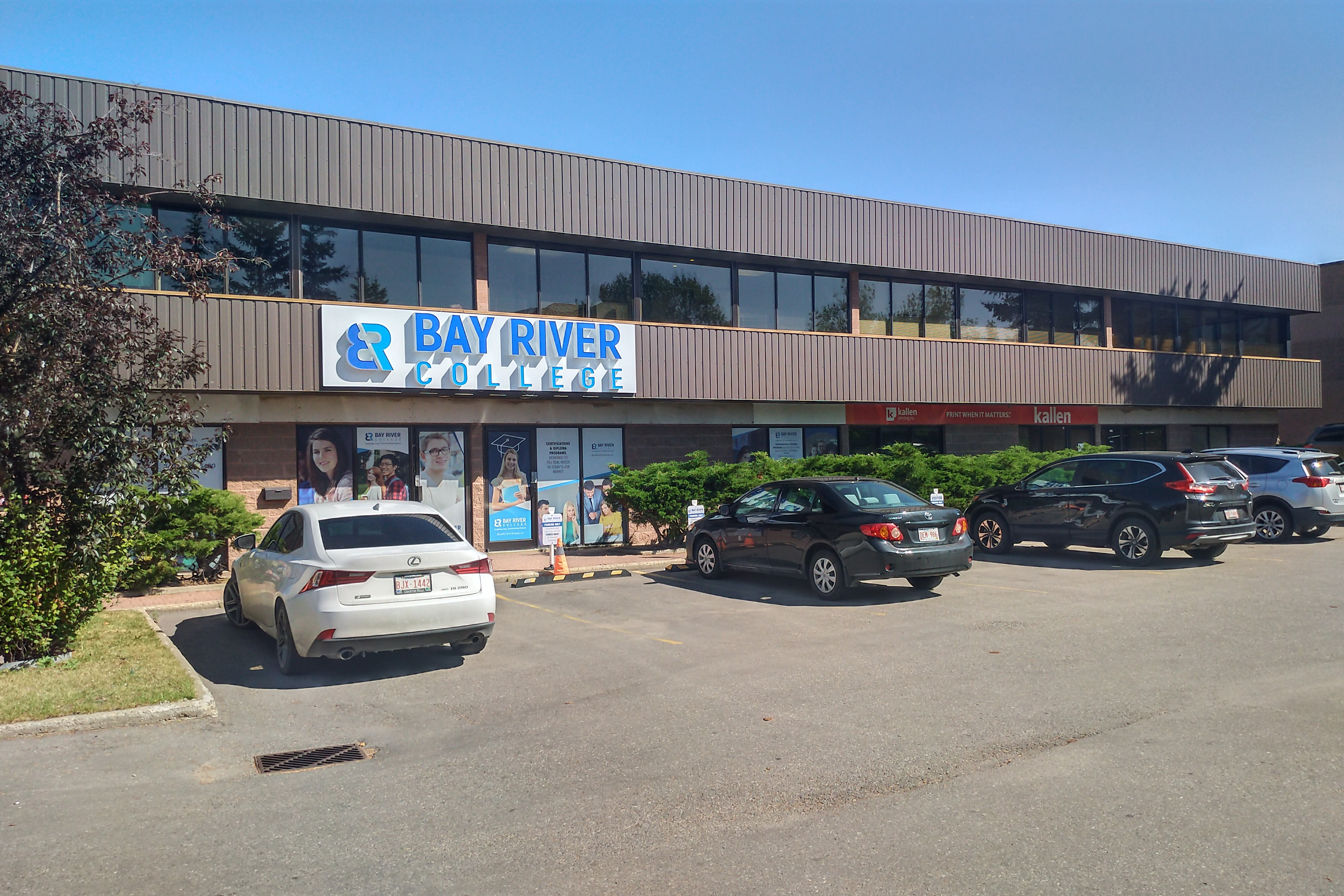
Bay River College's campus - 2019

Bay River College offers programs in Technology, Healthcare, Social Work, Management, Environmental sciences and Business. It offers one-year and two-year diplomas and certificates including IPAC Canada certification.

=== Clinical Research ===
- Applied Clinical Research (1-year post-graduate diploma)

=== Technology ===
- Applied Environmental Technology (2-year diploma)
- Information Technology and Network Administrator (1-year diploma)
- Cyber Security and Cloud Computing (2-year diploma)
- Process Piping Drafting (1-year diploma)

=== Healthcare ===
- Pharmacy Assistant (1-year diploma)
- Unit Clerk & Medical Office Administration (1-year diploma)
- Infection Prevention and Control (IPAC) Course Accredited by Canadian Nurses Association (CNA) and endorsed by IPAC Canada (complete certification)

=== Social Work ===
- Community Support Worker (2-year diploma)
- Education Assistant (1-year diploma)

=== Business ===
- International Business Management (2-year diploma)
- Hospitality Management (2-year diploma)

== Partners ==
Far Eastern University inked a memorandum of Agreement with Bay River College for the Hospitality Business Management Diploma Program and Internship in Canada last November 25, 2022.

== See also ==
- Education in Alberta
- List of colleges in Alberta
- List of universities and colleges in Alberta
