= Educacentre College =

Francophone college in British Columbia, Canada

- Collège Éducacentre
- Motto: Le collège francophone en Colombie-Britannique
- Motto in English: The French college in BC
- Type: Private
- Established: 1976
- President: Thomas Godin
- Director: Yvon Laberge
- Location: Vancouver, Victoria, and Prince George, British Columbia, Canada; 49°26′42″N 123°12′39″W
- Colours: Blue & white
- Website: educacentre.com
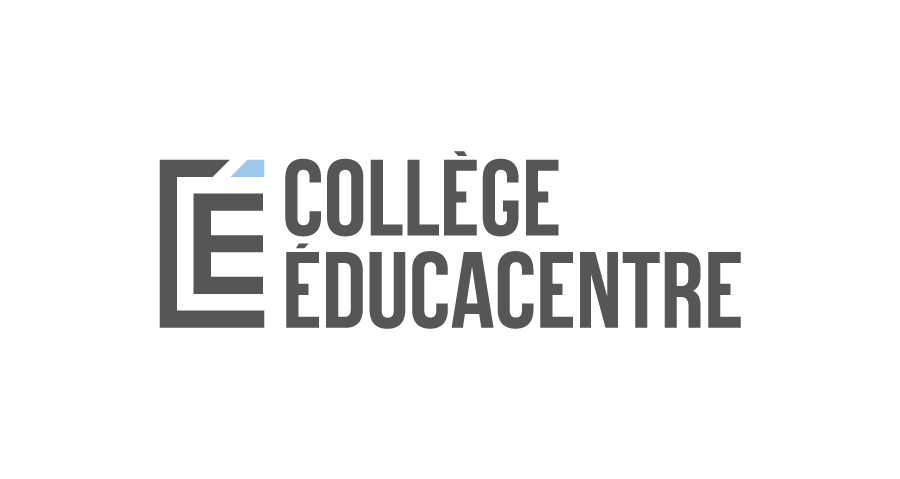

Educacentre College (French: Collège Éducacentre) is a private French-language college in British Columbia. The general aim is to provide people with bilingual language skills—that speakers of French receive education in their native language and at the same time receive English skills. It provides professional training on different levels, basic education for adults, professional development services, and services leading to the employment and integration of immigrants in French. One major area of work are French courses for English speaking people. The college has several campuses in different regions of the province, and e-learning on the Virtual Campus. It has been active since 1976 and was incorporated as a not for profit society in 1992.

== Campuses ==
The college has three campuses in British Columbia: Vancouver, Victoria, Prince George, complemented by the so-called Virtual Campus, to cover all remote areas throughout the province and offer services in accordance with the student's schedules. The college employs more than 50 full-time and part-time staff, and has an enrolment of over 1500.

== Programs ==
The college offers courses in:

- Education (Education Assistant, Early Childhood Education)
- Health care (Healthcare Assistant, Holistic Nutrition, Social Support Worker)
- Tourism and hospitality (Event Management)

All courses and programs are also offered as distance education completely in French. The college studies are supplemented by offers of continuing education, and customized training in the same subjects.

== Services and resources offered to students ==
Academic and career guidance, employment counselling, integration support for immigrants, workshops, language laboratory, resource centres for literacy, ICT and employment research, health care laboratory and a computer lab.
