= Cégep de Sorel-Tracy =

Public college in Sorel-Tracy, Quebec

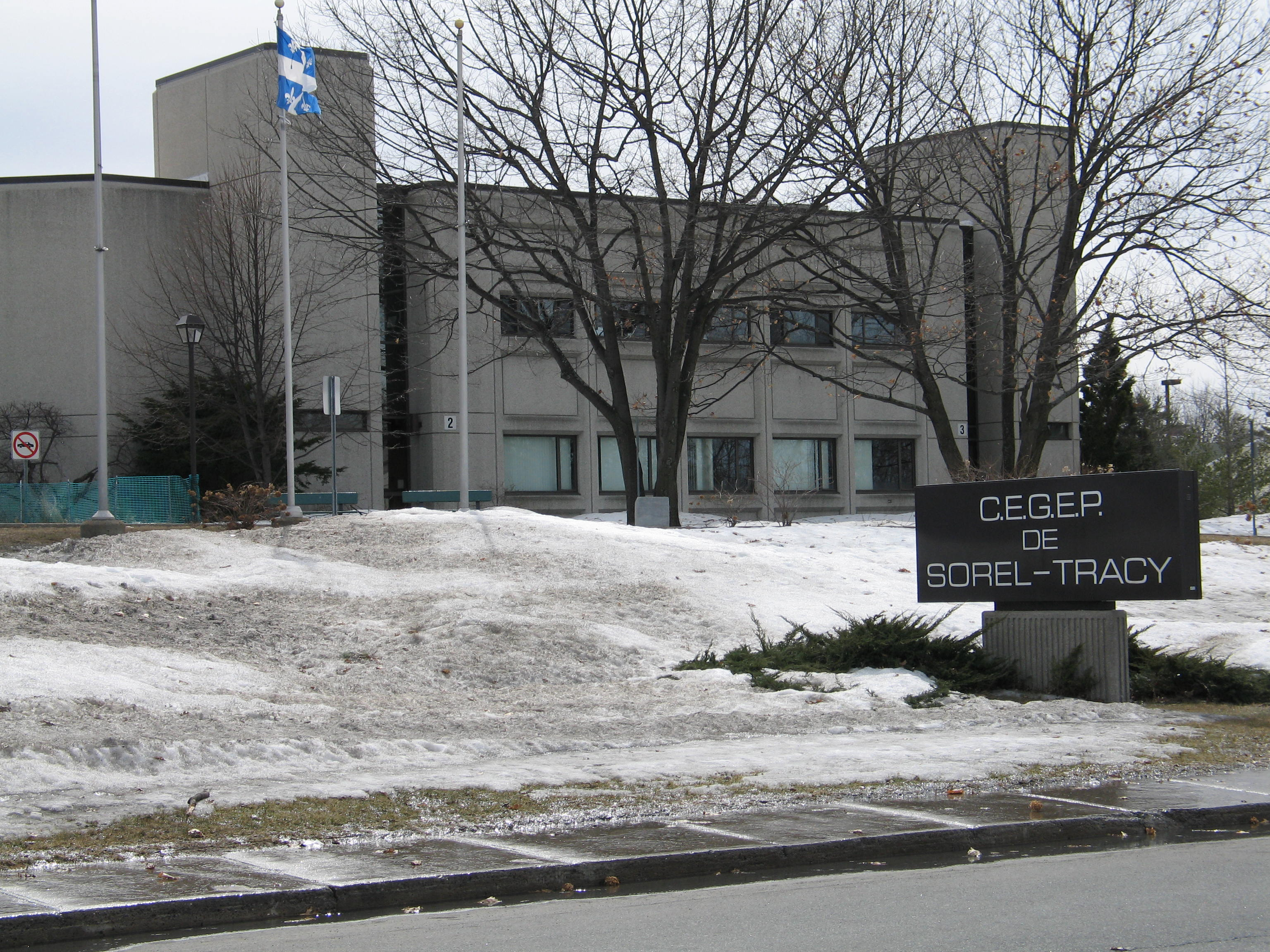
- Motto: Avoir la reussite à coeur!
- Motto in English: Have success in your heart
- Type: Public CEGEP
- Established: 1967
- Academic affiliations: ACCC, CCAA, QSSF, AUCC,
- Location: Sorel-Tracy, Quebec, Canada; 46°01′N 73°09′W
- Campus: Urban
- Nickname: Rebelles
- Website: www.cegepst.qc.ca

The Cégep de Sorel-Tracy is a post-secondary general and vocational institution located in Sorel-Tracy, Quebec, Canada.

== History ==
The college traces its origins to the merger of the Tracy Institute of Technology and the Sorel Classical Day School in 1968, just a year after the institutions were formed, and the Quebec system of CEGEPs was created.

First located in Tracy, the school was relocated to Sorel and then relocated again to Tracy (now called Sorel-Tracy since the merger of the two cities in 2000).

== Partnerships ==
The College of General and Vocational Education is affiliated with the ACCC, and CCAA.

== Programs ==
The CEGEP offers two types of programs: pre-university and technical. The pre-university programs, which take two years to complete, cover the subject matters which roughly correspond to the additional year of high school given elsewhere in Canada in preparation for a chosen field in university. The technical programs, which each take three years to complete, apply to students who wish to pursue a skill trade. Cégep de Sorel-Tracy is the first public Cégep to offer the Legal Techniques program free of charge.

Marc Olivier, professor in the Environment, Hygiene and Safety at Work program, received the highest distinction of the Ordre des Chimistes du Québec in 2023.

== See also ==
- List of colleges in Quebec
- Higher education in Quebec
