= Acsenda School of Management =

Degree college headquartered in Vancouver, Canada

Acsenda School of Management – Vancouver
- Motto: International Thinking. Individual Focus.
- Type: Private
- Established: 2015
- Chancellor: Ross Paul
- President: Neil Mort
- Location: Vancouver, British Columbia, Canada; 49.285197°N 123.119290°W
- Campus: Urban
- Website: http://www.acsenda.com/
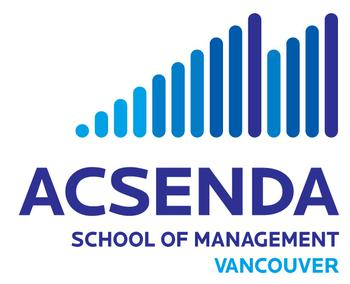

The Acsenda School of Management – Vancouver (also known as Acsenda), formerly known as Sprott Shaw Degree College, is an independent post-secondary institution offering competitive undergraduate degrees in both business administration and hospitality management headquartered in Vancouver, British Columbia, Canada. Patrick Dang was the president of Acsenda from 2010 until 2014. Dr. Lindsay Redpath took over as President in 2014 and continued in the role until July 31, 2017. Neil Mort officially took up the role as the current president in 2018.

== History ==
Acsenda School of Management is a private, for-profit institution based in Vancouver. The current campus is located at 666 Burrard Street. Formerly known as Sprott-Shaw Degree College, the name was changed to Acsenda School of Management in 2013. The institution has consent from the Minister of Advanced Education to offer both the Bachelor of Business Administration (BBA) and Bachelor of Hospitality Management (BHM) programs.

In 2004, Sprott Shaw Community College (SSC) decided to expand its educational offerings. The goal was to offer SSC graduates and others an easier way to obtain a BBA. After receiving the rights by the Minister of Advanced Education to offer the new degree, SSC had to differentiate the two schools. Sprott Shaw Degree College (SSD) was created with the intention of distinguishing itself from its vocational offerings.

The current president of Acsenda School of Management is Mr. Neil Mort, and the current Chancellor is Sir John Daniel. In 2016, Acsenda School of Management became part of the EduCo Education Group which provides post-secondary programs in 16 educational institutions and partnerships in four countries.

== Academics ==
Acsenda School of Management is a private institution. The institution offers two undergraduate degree programs: the Bachelor of Business Administration (BBA) and the Bachelor of Hospitality Management (BHM).

The Bachelor of Business Administration (BBA) has been offered by Acsenda since 2004 and is a 4-year undergraduate degree program. The BBA degree contains seven concentrations: human resources, marketing, accounting, international business, general business, financial management and management information systems. The Bachelor of Hospitality Management (BHM) has been offered by Acsenda since 2016 and is also a 4-year undergraduate degree program.

=== Faculty ===
Many faculty and instury professionals, offering theoretical and practical teaching methods. Students also have an opportunity for an international internship, allowing them to link classroom learning to the workplace environment.

== Campus ==
Acsenda School of Management has had four campuses in its history. The first campus was located in Burnaby, then moved to West Georgia and Granville Street, after that 1090 West Pender Street. Nowadays, the Acsenda campus is located in downtown accessible by Vancouver’s SkyTrain. Acsenda is well connected via public transport, biking, or walking with nearby cities and public areas. The campus is located at 666 Burrard St, Vancouver. The campus is equipped with well-furnished classrooms as well as high-speed wireless internet connection, computer labs, student forums, cafeteria, and a library.

== Student life ==
=== Campus activities ===
The school provides a wide range of events and activities for students, academic success seminars and career readiness workshops. A student society is made up of all students of Acsenda and elects its leaders to represent the student body. Students also provide representation on the Academic Council. In 2019, Acsenda initiated the Student Ambassador program, highlighting student leaders who go out of their way to help the staff on-campus and improve the local community.

The college hosts workshops, events, webinars, celebrations, conferences, and speakers on campus as well as smaller activity-based events.

=== Culture ===
Acsenda School of Management has diversity of students and staff from many countries and backgrounds. It provides various opportunities for students to experience different cultures, traditions, beliefs, and to be part of an inclusive community. For instance, celebration of various cultural events/holidays helps students to learn and experience other cultures.

=== Clubs ===
Many clubs have been organized at Acsenda, including: Hospitality Club, Marketing Club, Accounting Club, IBM Club, Human Resources Management Club, Leadership Entrepreneurship and Development Club (LEAD) and Gaming Club.

== See also ==
- List of colleges in British Columbia
- List of universities in British Columbia
- Higher education in British Columbia
- Education in Canada
