= McKenzie College (New Brunswick) =

Educational institution in Moncton, New Brunswick

Coordinates: 46.0881°N 64.7890°W

- Type: Private
- Established: 1988
- Location: Moncton, New Brunswick, Canada
- Campus: Urban
- Website: www.mckenzie.edu

McKenzie College is a private college in Moncton, New Brunswick, Canada. McKenzie College offers programs in Art and Design, business programs and IT. The college also includes the McKenzie Language Centre. The language center offers international students pathway programs into colleges/universities in the area.

== History ==
Since opening in 1988, McKenzie College has undergone several restructures of its multiple locations throughout Atlantic Canada before relocating to Moncton in 1997. The college has recently expanded to offer programs in information technology and English language training.

== Programs ==
•Visual Arts Foundation

•Interactive Design

•Visual Communication Design

•Video Game Art

•TV & Game Animation

•English language training classes
