= Alexander College =

College in Burnaby, British Columbia, Canada

- Established: 2006; 20 years ago
- President: Guangwei Ouyang
- Provost: Barbara Moon
- Students: 3,000 (Note: Appears to be headcount, not FTE.)
- Location: Burnaby and Vancouver, British Columbia, Canada
- Campus: 2
- Website: alexandercollege.ca

Alexander College is a private post-secondary institution in Burnaby, British Columbia, Canada. It was established in 2006 under the British Columbia Ministry of Advanced Education.

The college offers undergraduate degree and transfer programs including University Transfer, Associate of Arts degrees and Associate of Science degrees. In addition to local students, Alexander College enrolls students from over 60 countries. An integrated English for Academic Purposes program is also available to assist non-native English speakers with their transition to university level studies in the English language.

Alexander College is recognized and accredited by the BC Ministry of Advanced Education, Degree Quality Assurance Board (DQAB), BC Education Quality Assurance (EQA) program, and is a participant in the BC Transfer System, organized by the BC Council on Admissions and Transfer (BCCAT)

The academic year is divided into four terms: Fall (Sep. – Dec.), Winter (Jan. – Apr.), Spring (May – Jul.) and Summer intensive (Jul. – Aug.).

== History ==
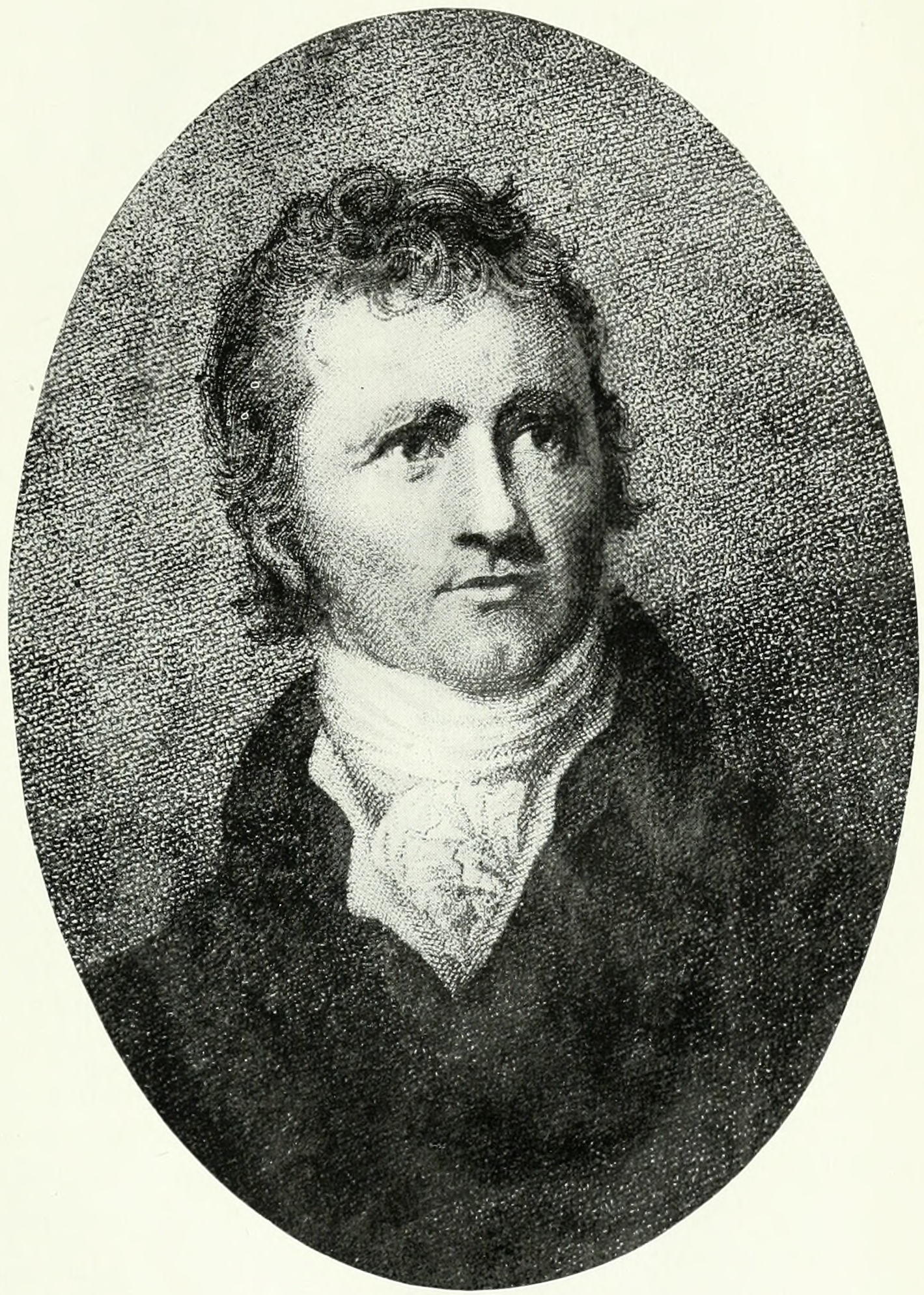
Sir Alexander Mackenzie

Alexander College is named for Sir Alexander Mackenzie, the Scottish-born fur trade adventurer and author.

Established in 2006, Alexander College first offered University Transfer and English for Academic Purposes programs designed to help first and second year undergraduates. In the same year the college was approved to offer the Associate of Arts degree, followed by the Associate of Science degree in 2011.

== Campuses ==
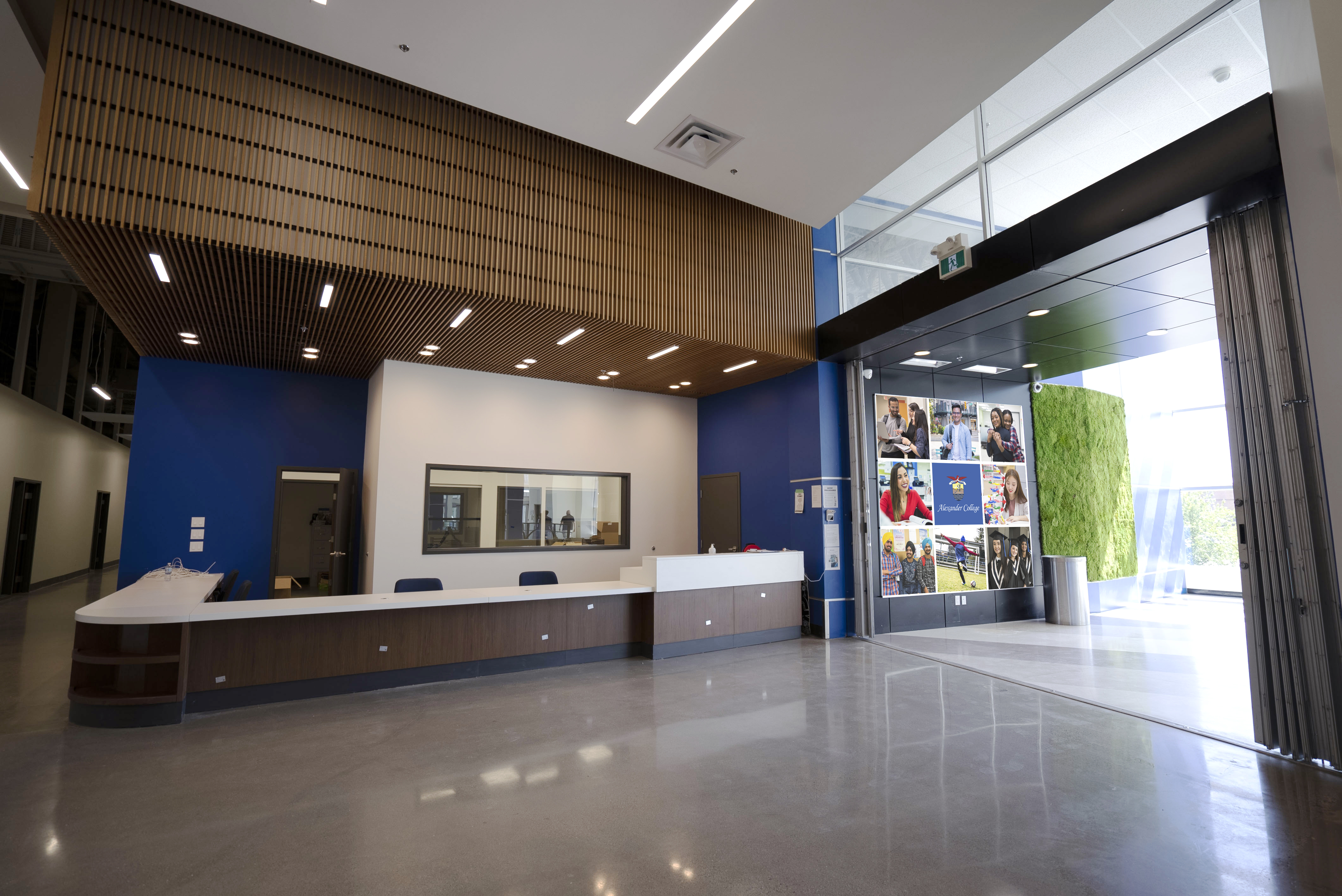
Alexander College campus entrance

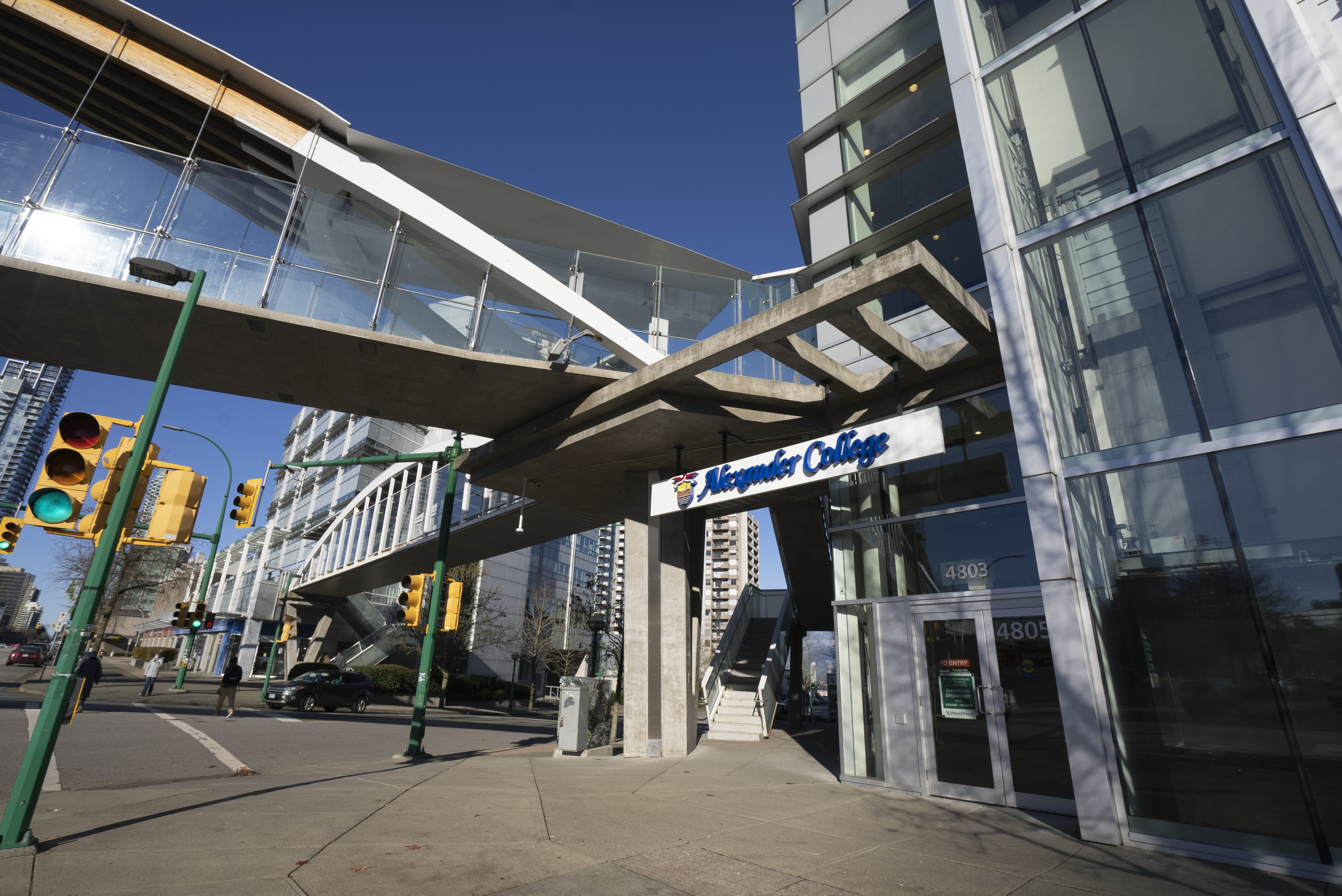
Alexander College campus exterior

Alexander College operates a campus in the urban centre of Burnaby, British Columbia, Canada. Burnaby is a suburb in the geographic centre of the Greater Vancouver Regional District. The campus is on Kingsway across from the Metropolis at Metrotown Mall. Facilities at the Burnaby campus include classrooms with the latest AV technology, science laboratory, Writing & Learning Centre, library, and bookstore.

The campus was constructed and opened to the public in the fall of 2021 after a several year development plan with help from the City of Burnaby and other contributors.

A second campus located in downtown Vancouver was opened in January 2025. This campus features a comfortable and spacious library, Writing and Learning Centre, student den/lounge, science labs, classrooms with the latest AV technology, and bookstore.

== Subject areas ==
Subject areas offered are:

- Asian Studies
- Biology
- Business Economics
- Chemistry
- Commerce
- Computer Science
- Economics
- English
- Film studies
- French
- History
- Mathematics
- Philosophy
- Physics
- Psychology
- Sociology
- Statistics
- University preparation
