= Collège de Rosemont =

Public college in Montréal, Quebec

Coordinates: 45°33′26″N 73°34′54″W

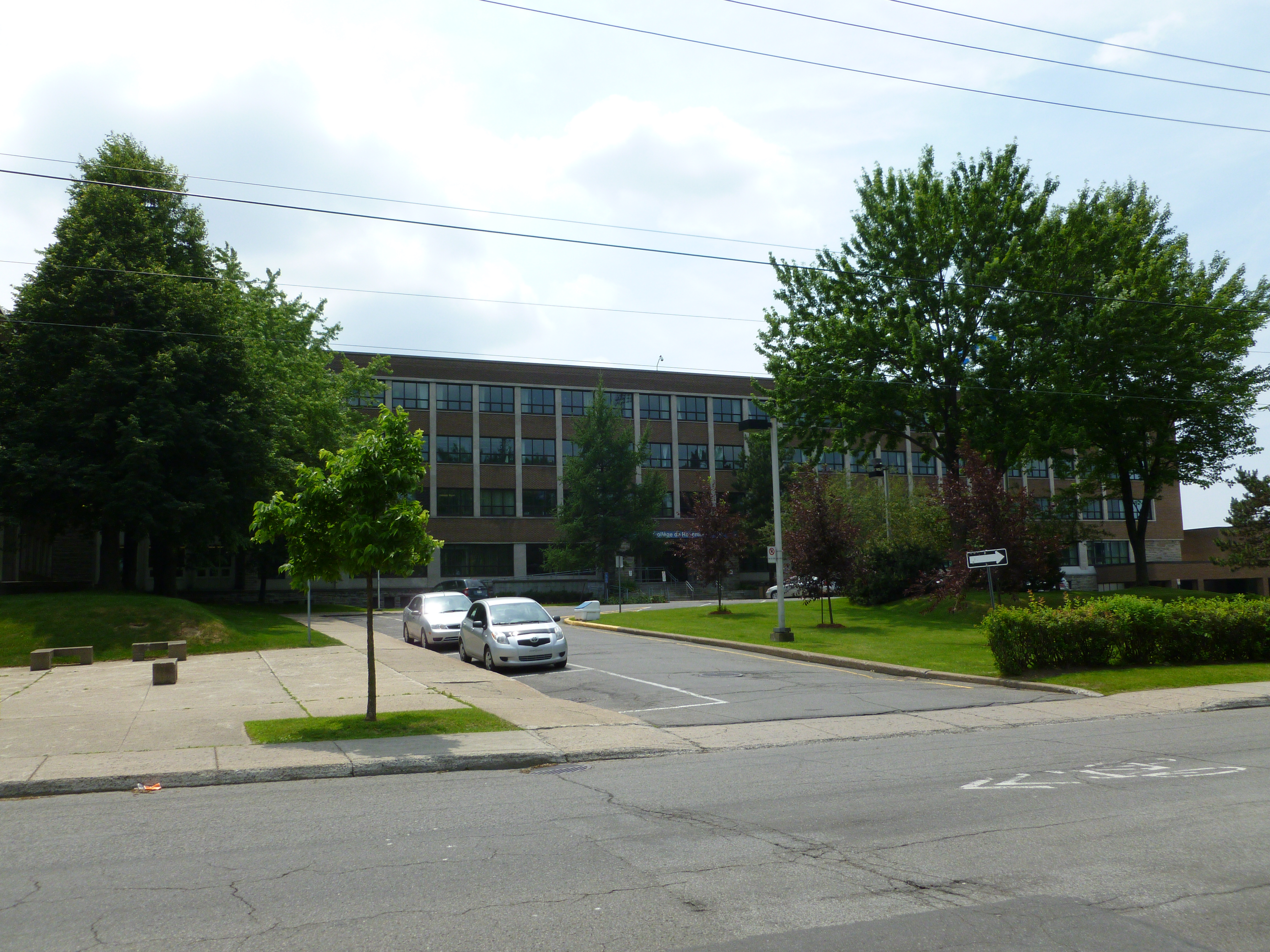
- Established: 1954
- Founders: Father Gerard Cornellier
- Location: Montreal
- Website: www.crosemont.qc.ca

Cégep de Rosement is a French public college in Montreal, Quebec, Canada. The school was founded in September 1954 by Father Gerard Cornellier. It is located at 6400 16th avenue, corner Beaubien Street in the borough of Rosemont–La Petite-Patrie.

Cégep à Distance, Quebec's distance education francophone institution, is affiliated with the college.
