= Sprott Shaw College =

Private Canadian career college in British Columbia

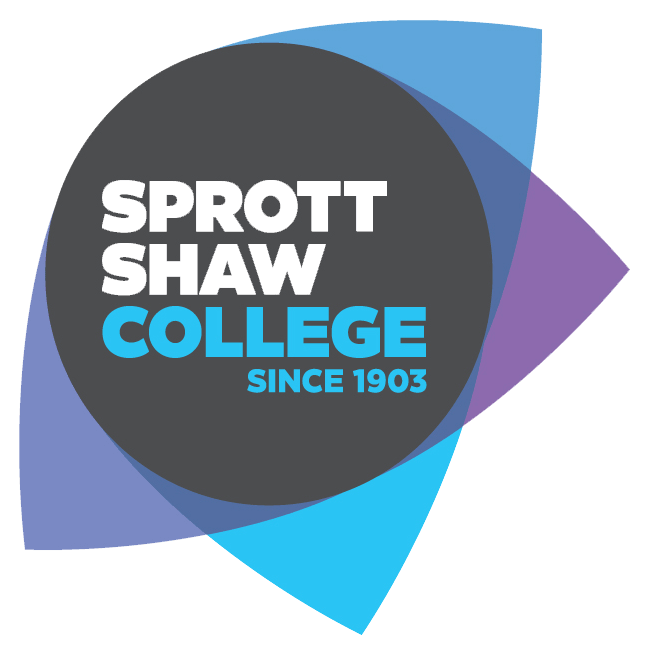
- Motto: Learning with Purpose Since 1903
- Type: Private career college, community college
- Established: 1903; 123 years ago
- President: Victor Tesan
- Students: 3,500 (annually)
- Location: British Columbia, Canada
- Nickname: Sprott Shaw
- Website: sprottshaw.com

Sprott Shaw College is a private Canadian college, headquartered in British Columbia. Sprott Shaw offers programs in areas such as Healthcare and Nursing, Business, Administration, Trades, Design, Human and Social Services, and Early Childhood Education.

== History ==
Sprott Shaw College is one of British Columbia’s oldest post-secondary institutions. To date, the Victoria campus, which opened in 1913, is Sprott Shaw’s longest standing location.

=== Founding ===
In 1903, Robert James Sprott partnered with William Henry Shaw of Shaw Colleges to open the first Sprott Shaw College campus, then called Vancouver Business Institute, but renamed to Sprott Shaw Business Institute.

Following the success of the first college, they opened more campuses across cities in Western Canada including Vancouver, Nanaimo, and Victoria.

By 1921, the Sprott Shaw chain was the largest commercial school in Western Canada with 12 banner schools across Canada and a few locations in the United States.

In 1964, Ernie Henderson of Henderson Colleges purchased and acquired Sprott Shaw and was the owner until his death in 1974. After this, the Victoria campus was then purchased by Commander Robert N.G. (Bud) Smith, who operated the school until 1988, when Terry Hackett purchased the school.

=== Program Offerings ===
Ever since its inception, Sprott Shaw College has offered programs based on the demands of the market.

In their early years, Sprott Shaw specifically designed programs to retrain military personnel after the First World War. This training included Morse Code, Radio Broadcasting, and Aviation. During this time, the college also established a broadcast station, with a signal connection that could be read as far away as Hawaii.

In addition to being a pioneer of commercial radio in British Columbia, Sprott Shaw began one of the province’s flight schools. Their flight school took over British Columbia Airways and offered flight training at their Aviation School. During this time, gliders were used to teach students elementary flight principles.

=== Sprott Shaw Today ===
In 2012, the school, formerly known as Sprott-Shaw Community College, restructured into Sprott Shaw College and Sprott Shaw Degree College. In 2013, Sprott Shaw Degree College was renamed Ascenda School of Management. In 2016, Ascenda School of Management became part of the EduCo Education Group.

Today, the campuses of Sprott Shaw train over 3,500 students each year at 16 campuses across British Columbia. All locations feature small class sizes, hands-on training, and job placement support.

Sprott Shaw’s program offerings today include Practical Nursing, Dental Assistant, Early Childhood Education, Community Support Worker, Sales and Digital Marketing, International Trade, Design, Trades, and much more.

== Corporate ==
In December 2007, Sprott Shaw Community College was acquired by CIBT Education Group Inc. They now operate under the legal name of Sprott Shaw College Inc. Sprott Shaw continues to expand its market and now has partnerships across the globe.

Since 2017, Victor Tesan has been the President of Sprott Shaw College. (see Financial Statements)
