= Collège nordique francophone =

College in the Northwest Territories, Canada

Collège nordique
- Type: Public college
- Established: 2011
- Affiliations: CICan
- Academic affiliations: UArctic
- Director: Patrick Arsenault
- Location: Yellowknife, Northwest Territories, Canada
- Campus: Rural
- Website: www.cnordique.ca//

The Collège nordique (CN) (English: Nordic Francophone College) is the only French-language college in the city of Yellowknife, in the Northwest Territories, Canada.

The college was founded in 2011 to improve the presence of French-language speakers in the Northwest Territories and stimulate the economy of the Northwest Territories through enhanced workforce training and development.
