= College (Canada) =

Type of tertiary school in Canada

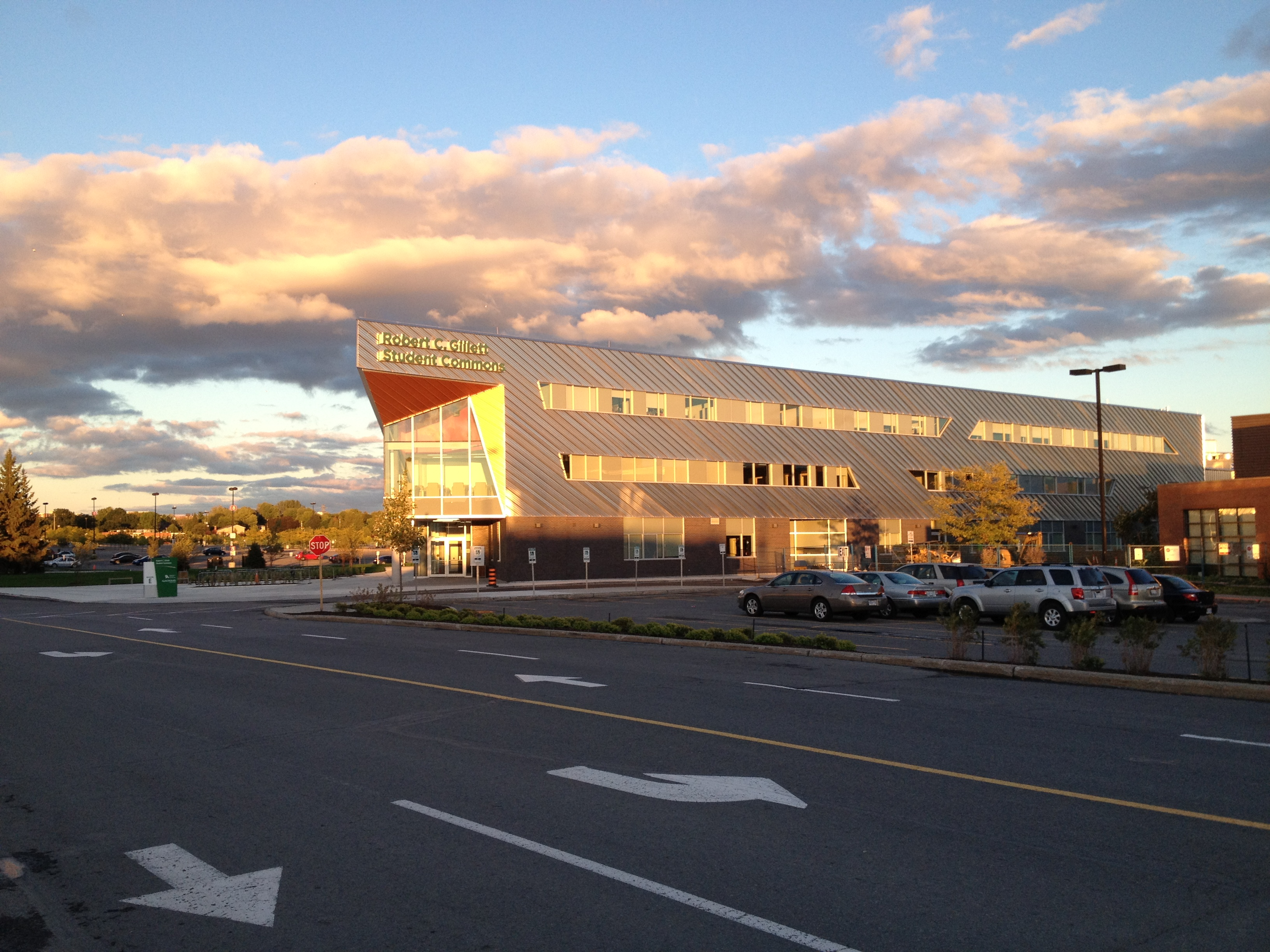
The student commons building at Algonquin College in Ottawa, Ontario.

In Canadian English, the term college usually refers to a career college, technical, trades, community college, college of applied arts or applied technology, or an applied science school. These are post-secondary institutions granting apprenticeships, citations, certificates, diplomas, and advanced diplomas, and sometimes degrees. Colleges are thereby distinct from universities in Canada, which typically have a greater emphasis on theoretical education and research.

== Terminology ==
In the English-speaking parts of Canada, the term "college" is generally used to refer to vocational schools that provide trade and technical education in various specialized vocational disciplines across specific employment fields. Among the institutions that fall into the "college" category include vocational colleges, career colleges, community colleges, institutes of technology or science, technical schools, colleges of applied arts or applied technology, and in Quebec through collèges d’enseignement général et professionnel.

There is a distinction between "college" and "university" in Canada. In conversation, one specifically would say either "They are going to university" (i.e., studying for a four-year bachelor's degree at a university) or "They are going to college" (which may imply enrolling in a vocational school in some parts of the country). In American English, (and in formal British English as well) the word college is especially used for what Canadians would call the undergraduate level of a university, but in popular use it to refers to the entire gestalt of the realm of post-secondary studies, regardless of level of prestige. Canadians, on the other hand, use the term university to exclusively mean the pursuit of undergraduate and graduate post-secondary studies.

In Ontario and Alberta, and formerly in British Columbia, there are also institutions which are designated university colleges, as they only grant undergraduate degrees. This is to differentiate between universities, which have both undergraduate and graduate programs and those that do not. Prior to use of the term University College in Canada, some colleges in British Columbia offered university-level courses equivalent to a full first and second year where college transfer credits can be earned and applied towards a 4 year degree in selected programs if a student expresses a desire to transfer to a Canadian university.

=== Quebec ===
In Quebec, mostly with speakers of Quebec English, the term "college" is seldom used for post secondary education. Instead the word CEGEP has become the more common term, although collégial remains the preferred adjectival form. A CEGEP is a public college in the Quebec education system, offering either a two-year diploma, which allows one to continue on to university (unless one applies as a 'mature' student, meaning 21 years of age or over, and out of the educational system for at least two years), or a three-year diploma in a variety of trades and technologies (e.g. nursing, mechanical engineering or computer science).

== Other uses ==
=== Institution within a university ===
The term college also applies to distinct entities that formally act as an affiliated institution of the university, formally referred to as federated college, or affiliated colleges. A university may also formally include several constituent colleges, forming a collegiate university. Examples of collegiate universities in Canada include Trent University, and the University of Toronto. These colleges act independently, but in affiliation or federation with the university that actually grants the degrees. For example, Trinity College was once an independent institution, but later became federated with the University of Toronto, and is now one of its residential colleges.

Occasionally, "college" may also refer to a subject specific faculty within a university that, and while academically distinct, do not operate in an autonomous manner as federated or affiliated. Examples of the word college used in this instance includes College of Education, College of Medicine, College of Dentistry, College of Biological Science, among others.

=== Private career colleges ===
The registration and accreditation of private career colleges are regulated by Private Career College Acts for each province. In British Columbia for example, the Private Career Training Institutions Agency (PCTIA) is responsible for the registration and accreditation of private career college in British Columbia under the Private Career Training Institutions Act (SBC 2003, Chapter 79), Regulations (BC Reg.466/2004), an bylaws.

=== Regulatory college ===
Regulatory colleges also use the word college in reference to itself. Examples of such include the Royal College of Physicians and Surgeons of Canada.

=== University-level institutions ===
The Royal Military College of Canada is a military college that aims to train officers for the Canadian Armed Forces. However, the institution is a full-fledged degree-granting university, despite the use of the word college in its name. The institution's sister schools, Royal Military College Saint-Jean also uses the term college in its name, although it academic offering is akin to the standard definition of college in Canada.

A number of post-secondary art schools in Canada formerly used the word college in their names, despite formally being universities, and having the authority to issue postgraduate degrees. However, most of these institutions were renamed or re-branded in the early 21st century, dropping the word college in favour of university. In 2003, the Nova Scotia College of Art and Design was renamed NSCAD University. In 2010, the Ontario College of Art and Design was re-branded as OCAD University, although formally its name was changed to the Ontario College of Art and Design University.

The Alberta College of Art + Design was another post-secondary arts school that had the word college in its name. However, unlike NSCAD, or OCAD, it did not have the authority to grant postgraduate degrees, making its academic offerings akin to the standard definition of college in Canada. The Alberta College of Art + Design was formally granted university-status in 2019, and was subsequently renamed the Alberta University of the Arts to reflect its new status.

=== Use in secondary education ===
A number of secondary schools continue to use the word college in their names. Public separate school boards in Ontario use the word college in the names of their secondary schools. A number of independent secondary schools also use the word college in their names, including Columbia International College, Crestwood Preparatory College, Havergal College, Lakefield College School, Lower Canada College, Ridley College, St. Andrew's College, Trinity College School, and Upper Canada College.

Public secular school boards in Ontario also refer to their secondary schools as collegiate institutes. The term originated from a historical parallel secondary school system operated in Ontario, where two streams of secondary education were offered. Collegiate institutes offered academic education for prospective university students, whereas High Schools/Secondary Schools, offered vocational training for students planning to immediately enter the workforce. The education system was reorganized in the early 20th century, with the two secondary streams merged. After the merger, the terms Collegiate Institute, High School, and Secondary School were all used in conjunction to refer to secondary institutions in Ontario. Saskatchewan also modelled their secondary system after Ontario's two-stream model in the early 20th century. As a result, a number of secondary schools in Regina, and Saskatoon are referred to as Collegiate.
