= Manresa House =

Manresa House may refer to:

- Manresa House, Dublin, Ireland
- Manresa Jesuit Spiritual Renewal Centre, in Pickering, Ontario, Canada
- Manresa Spirituality Centre, Quebec, Canada
- Parkstead House, formerly Manresa House, London, UK

== See also ==
- Manresa (disambiguation)
