= Parent Commission =

The Royal Commission of Inquiry on Education in the Province of Quebec, better known as the Parent Commission, was a commission established in 1961 by the newly elected Lesage government to investigate the education system in Quebec up until the 1960s. It was chaired by M^{gr} Alphonse-Marie Parent, and consisted of 8 members. The resulting report, the Parent Report, published between 1963-66 in 5 volumes, consisted of nearly 1500 pages, and proposed some 500 recommendations that led to following major reforms of the then church-dominated education system:

- Creation of the Ministry of Education in 1964 to ensure a centralised, state-controlled education system serving the mass population;
- Creation of the Conseil supérieur de l’éducation in 1964 to advise the Minister of Education on any education-related issues;
- Age for compulsory schooling raised from 14 to 16;
- Creation of collèges d’enseignement général et professionnel (CEGEPs) in 1967 to replace classical colleges administered by the Roman Catholic clergy;

The Parent Commission, as a product of the Quiet Revolution, helped to create one public, unified, comprehensive, democratic, education system accessible to everyone at all levels, which in turn helped to reduce disparities between men and women, urban and rural, English and French populations.

== History ==
From July 1960, the Liberal government led by Jean Lesage who believed that 'an education system corresponding to our needs and open to all, rich or poor, urban or rural dwellers, is vital to our economic progress and the gradual increase in our standard of living', had adopted new legislation in favour of an education reform which were collectively known under the title 'Grand Charte de l’éducation'. It was a series of measures aiming at overcoming century-old elitism and at promoting universal accessibility to all levels of education through a reformed network of institutions and the establishment of financial assistance programs. Among these measures, the Parent Commission was created on April 21, 1961.

Before the pedagogical reform initiated by the Parent Commission in the 60's, the situations in Quebec's educational environments was a 'real hodgepodge': schools were designated as either Catholic or Protestant, administered by more than 1,500 school boards divided by confessionality, with each school board in charge of its own curriculum, textbooks, and recognition of diplomas.

The under-schooling of French Canadians was apparent: compared with 36% of English-speaking students, only 13% of French-speaking students complete Grade 11. Moreover, 63% of French-speaking students stopped at Grade 7. At higher education, the discrepancy was apparent from 1960 university enrolment statistics showing that only 3% of French Canadians aged between 20-24 attended university, whereas enrolment at the 3 English universities in Quebec represented 11% of English-speakers in the same age group.

By the time the Commission was formed, due to post-war prosperity in terms of both population and economic growth, baby boomers were reaching adolescence, and the province was in dire need of adequate training programs to respond to the increasing demand for specialised labour that met an industrialised society's need.

In the early 1960s, changes were also in the mind of practitioners of Catholic faith, which were brought out by the Second Vatican Council (1962-65) that aimed at integrating modern human experience with church principles.

== Members ==
The Commissioners were selected to represent various sectors of Quebec society: male-female, English-French, Catholic-Protestant, academic-business, private-public, and lay-religious. Among the 8 members, there were:

- 6 men and 2 women
- 6 French Canadians, one Irish, and one Scottish
- 7 Catholics and one Protestant, all practicing at the time
- 4 university professors and one businessman
- 7 representing private institutions (universities and colleges were private schools), with the Irish person being the only person representing public sector
- 6 Montrealers and 2 Quebecers; but nobody represented a rural area

One of the two women was a sister. 6 out of 8 members were trained in the classical colleges, which were mostly boys' institutions (among some 100 classical colleges, only about 20 admitted girls). The members were:

1. M^{gr} Alphonse-Marie Parent (president), Catholic priest and vice-rector of Laval University;
2. Gérard Filion (vice-president), director of Le Devoir;
3. Paul Larocque, lawyer and adjoint secretary of Aluminium Ltd;
4. David Munroe, director of McGill's Institute of Education at Macdonald College; in 1964 he replaced Mr. Filion as the vice-president of the Commission
5. Sister Marie-Laurent de Rome (Ghislaine Roquet), professor of philosophy and religion at Basile-Moreau College;
6. Jeanne Lapointe, professor of French literature at Laval University;
7. John McIlhone, assistant director of studies in charge of English classes at the Montreal Catholic School Commission;
8. Guy Rocher, sociologist and professor at University of Montreal.

There were also an adjoint member Arthur Tremblay (without the right to vote), and 3 other associated staff members: C. Wynne Dickson, Michel Giroux, and Louis-Philippe Audet.

== Development ==
During the course of several years, the Commissioners received 349 memoirs, interviewed 125 educators, visited some 50 schools in Quebec, Canada, United States, and Europe.

The first observation the Commissioners made was the low level of formal schooling among French Canadians, especially girls, compared with English Canadians: most of them didn't go further than primary school. The archaic education system controlled by the Church was made so that only a small minority of elites (mostly male) could afford to complete the 8 years training in classical colleges with a dropout rate of 70%. All schools were private, and principally Catholic.

In order to make education more accessible to the entire population, the Commissioners, knowing that the education system in Quebec would need to pass from private to public, recommended the creation of a Ministry of Education that would have sufficient regulatory power to ensure the financing of the schools, from primary to university.

That education was to be placed under secular authority was a radical heresy at the time when all the powers were seized by the 22 bishops of Quebec. The English Protestants were equally shocked by the proposition that they would be placed under the same ministry, because prior to 1960's, the Protestants -- including McGill University -- had enjoyed total autonomy within the education system of Quebec. Lesage government needed to spend an year negotiating with both Catholics and Protestants for them to finally agree to the creation of this ministry, under the responsibility of Paul Gérin-Lajoie, the first Minister of Education.

The second issue the Commissioners noticed was that at secondary level, several types of institutions co-existed in parallel: studies at classical colleges led up to university; training at normal schools paved way for a career in teaching; plus liberal arts colleges and other vocational schools and technical institutes under the authority of several ministries that provided training of uneven quality and incompatible diplomas. Also, after having gathered various opinions of specialists in higher education, the Commissioners learned that passage from high school to university was difficult. University has always had trouble imparting specialised knowledge to freshman students coming out of high schools who were ill-equipped with introductory program-specific knowledge. University professors and lecturers were not trained to give generalised courses.

Hence, inspired by California's junior colleges (which in 1967 were renamed community colleges and unified into the California Community Colleges system), the Commissioners suggested inserting an intermediate level, later known as collège d’enseignement général et professionnel or CEGEPs, to fill the gap between high school and undergraduate degree or between high school and workplace. These colleges were to be created from existing classical colleges and vocational schools. The new structure would assume the role of instructing general courses in language and humanities, introductory courses in various fields of study as preparation for undergraduate studies, and to provide industry with the skilled labour required in a modern society.

== The Parent Report ==
In summary, of the Parent Report:

- Volume I published in 1963 contained the radical proposal of creating a Ministry of Education.
- Volume II and III unrevealed in 1964 presented a set of proposals for improving the structure of education in the province, including recommendation of developing a network of public kindergartens, mixed and tuition-free, aimed at children of 4-year old.
- Volume IV and V made public in 1966 dealt with cultural and religious diversity, educational finance, and school administration at the local level.

The Commissioners highlighted in the report problems existing within the education system in Quebec and recommended numerous significant reforms to solve them, which led to the secularisation, democratisation and the modernisation of the then church-dominated education system. Indignant at the beginning, the Catholic Church conceded to the secularisation of the education system on the condition that school boards remained confessional (the confessional division was only abolished in the late 90's).

Upon the report's recommendation, CEGEPs were created in 1967. Its 2-year pre-university program bridges between high school and university, while its 3-year vocational programs lead directly to the job market. 12 CEGEPs opened their doors in September 1967, 11 others the next year. Financial assistance was introduced in the form of student loans and bursaries.

Primary schools and vocational training were reformed. School curriculums were standardized. Aspiring teachers are now provided with adequate training program at the university level. Before the reform, Quebec primary and secondary school teachers ranked significantly lower than those in other jurisdictions of North America. 1961–62 figures indicate that 90% of Catholic (French-speaking) teachers and 65% of Protestant (English-speaking) teachers had less than or equal to 13 years of schooling. See Higher education in Quebec.

After a state-controlled education system that values the mass population was in place, to ensure that everyone has equal opportunity to benefit from it, the Report proposes extending the tuition-free policy from primary school to university in the long run. Addressing the deep-rooted inequalities in our society, the Commission wanted to ensure that the economic obstacles to access to higher education are reduced to a minimum. Freezing tuition fee is a temporary measure that is put in place before the eventual elimination of this fee. In the spirit of the report, society at large should be responsible for the cost of educating the young.

== Other Legacy ==
School Attendance of Youths Aged 15 to 17 in 1960 and 1970
Age	1970	1960
15 years old	94%	75%
16 years old	84%	51%
17 years old	63%	31%

'Qui s’instruit s’enrichit' (education for a brighter future), exclaimed the reformers. Quebec society now believed in the power of education. It has recognised education as a high social priority, and has accepted since the publication of the Parent Report that education budgets be increased to comprise a large percentage of public expenditures. As a result, school attendance at the high school level increased significantly from 1960 to 1970.

The educational reform advocated by the Parent Report also carries out an unexpected outcome: the founding of University of Quebec network, which was not implemented according to the initial proposals of the Commission. After the establishment of CEGEPs, an increasing number of students chose to pursue undergraduate studies, adding pressure on Quebec's existing 6 universities in urban areas. Hence, modelled after state university system in New York State and California, University of Quebec with its 4 initial campuses in Montreal, Trois Rivières, Rimouski and Chicoutimi, and later in Hull, and Rouyn-Noranda, was created to guarantee access to comprehensive university education for the regions. These universities offer programs corresponding to the characteristics of the regions: oceanography in Rimouski, aluminium in Chicoutimi, forestry in Trois-Rivières, and mining in Rouyn-Noranda, etc.

== See also ==
- Education in Quebec
- Quiet Revolution
