= Manresa (disambiguation) =

Manresa is the capital of Bages in Catalonia, Spain.

Manresa may also refer to:

== Buildings ==
- Manresa House, Dublin, Ireland
- Manresa Island, Connecticut, USA
- Manresa Jesuit Spiritual Renewal Centre, in Pickering, Ontario, Canada
- Manresa (restaurant), Former Michelin-starred restaurant in Los Gatos, California, USA
- Manresa School, Panama
- Manresa Spirituality Centre, Quebec, Canada
- Parkstead House, formerly Manresa House, London, UK
- Manresa State Beach in Santa Cruz County, California

== People ==
- Elena Manresa, Spanish economist
- Josefina Manresa (1916–1987), Spanish seamstress and poetry curator

== Places ==
- Manresa State Beach, California, USA
