= Les insolences du Frère Untel =

1960 book by Jean-Paul Desbiens

The Impertinences of Brother Anonymous
- Author: Jean-Paul Desbiens
- Original title: Les insolences du Frère Untel
- Language: French
- Publisher: Les Éditions de l'Homme
- Publication date: 1960
- Publication place: Canada

Les insolences du Frère Untel (French pronunciation: [lez‿ɛ̃sɔlɑ̃s dy fʁɛʁ œ̃tɛl]) is a book first published in Montreal by Les Éditions de l'Homme in 1960. In a very short time it sold more than 100,000 copies, in a society where a book with a 10,000 copy print run was considered a best seller. The anonymous author was Jean-Paul Desbiens, a Marist Brother, who attacked the church-controlled education system in Quebec.

The book had an important impact on the Quiet Revolution in Quebec and on the educational reforms that eventually shaped the present Quebec education system.

Desbiens was scathing in his attack of the existing system of classical colleges, where Latin reigned supreme. He also criticized the poor quality of the French language in Quebec, which he called joual. He called for massive reforms in all aspects of the system. Later, he was also very critical of the way the reforms were carried out.

The book was translated as The Impertinences of Brother Anonymous and published by the Montreal-based publisher Harvest House in 1962.

There is a more recent French edition which is still kept in print by les Editions de l'homme and dated 1988. (ISBN 2761915844)
