= Classical college =

Type of school in Quebec, Canada

Classical colleges (collèges classiques) were a type of school in Quebec. Since its inception in the 17th century, up until the Quiet Revolution of the 1960s, classical college with its eight years of training in classics was the necessary pathway for Quebec's social elites to attain university and other professions. Their studies at the classical colleges would lead to the baccalauréat ès arts (which must not be confused with a bachelor's degree conferred by a university).

== History ==
The precursor of classical college in Quebec was the Jesuit College of Quebec (Collège des Jésuites de Québec, today's St. Charles Garnier College) founded by Jesuit missionaries in 1634 in New France as the first teaching establishment in North America. At this time, the college received mostly the sons of civil servants and naval officers who governed the colony. During the Seven Years' War, it was forced to close in 1759. Later, the education of French Canadian bourgeois was entrusted to the Seminary of Quebec, founded by Bishop François de Laval in 1663, and 39 other classical colleges that were to appear between 1635 and 1919. Between 1765 and 1840, 10 colleges were founded. Then between 1840 and 1919, one college appeared every three years.

The Society of Jesus was suppressed by Pope Clement XIV in 1773 everywhere in the world, and was not restored until 1814 by Pope Pius VII. The Jesuits returned to Canada in 1842, but were prohibited to reclaim their lands. They found Collège Sainte-Marie de Montréal in Montreal in 1848. In 1849, they resumed their teaching mission aimed at training clergy and lay people at the Minor Seminary of Quebec, which became one of the first classical colleges in Quebec. This model has inspired subsequent founding of classical colleges in the province in the 19th century. The model also served to found various colleges elsewhere in Canada: in Acadie and Manitoba (Université de Saint-Boniface among others). Until 1964, Quebec lacked a public education system, instead having two education systems with one run by the Catholic church and another run by the Protestant churches.

By the end of the 19th century, classical colleges flourished in Quebec. They were all over the territory of the province. Every region except Gaspésie had its college. The cities of Quebec and Montreal had one and three. The regions with the highest number of colleges are from Saint-Thérèse-de-Blainville to Saint-Jean-sur-Richelieu (13 colleges). Originally all boys’ institutions, they began accepting girls in 1908, when the first classical college for girls opened its door.

Classical colleges disappeared in the late 1960s by merging with vocational institutions to become the newly created CEGEPs.

== Structure ==
Classical colleges offered a first-stage of four years of secondary program, and a second-stage of four years of collegiate program, totalling in 8 years of studies. Upon the completion of these courses, a baccalauréat ès arts would be awarded by one of the 3 French-language universities to the graduates of classical colleges affiliated with these universities. Once passing the exams imposed by the Faculty of Arts of these universities, the BA holder would be permitted to enrol in a university.

Inherited from the humanist model of the 16th-century French tradition, courses given at classical college were mainly based on classical and early Jesuit traditions. The eight years of courses bear the following names:

1. Latin elements;
2. Syntax;
3. Method;
4. Versification;
5. Belles-lettres;
6. Rhetoric;
7. Philosophy I;
8. Philosophy II.

== Critics and disappearance ==
By the beginning of the 20th century, classical courses faced increasing criticism of being ill-adapted to the need and the reality of the modern world. With undue emphasis on the Renaissance, the curriculum orientated towards the study of theology, philosophy, classics, and letters, with little exposure to mathematics and science. Teaching was under the supervision of Roman Catholic clergy. All classical colleges were private. The dropout rate was 70 per cent. Attending classical college was a privilege of the very few at the time. The level of education for French-speaking Quebecois was the lowest in the entire Canada.

After the education reform initiated by the Parent Report, the first five years of classical college became the five years of secondary school in Quebec. Courses in Classical Greek and Latin were abolished. The year of rhetoric was suppressed, and the last two years of philosophy became the two years of pre-university programs in CEGEPs.
