= Alphonse-Marie Parent =

Canadian priest, educator and academic administrator

- Born: April 2, 1906; Saint-Jean-Chrysostome, Quebec
- Died: October 7, 1970 (aged 64)
- Occupations: Priest, educator and academic administrator
- Awards: Order of Canada

Alphonse-Marie Parent CC (April 2, 1906 – October 7, 1970) was a Canadian priest, educator and academic administrator. He is best known for having given his name to the Parent Report on the reform of Quebec's education system.

Born in Saint-Jean-Chrysostome, Quebec, the son of Alphonse Parent and Marie Gosselin, he studied at the Collège de Sainte-Anne-de-la-Pocatière and the Séminaire de Québec. He was ordained a priest in 1929, and obtained a doctorate in philosophy from the Catholic University of Louvain. During the 1940s, he worked for the Austrian imperial family and for Pope Pius XII. He was vice-rector of Université Laval from 1949 to 1954 and rector there from 1954 until 1960.

In 1965, he received an honorary doctorate from Sir George Williams University, which later became Concordia University.

From 1961 to 1966, he was president of the Royal Commission of Enquiry on Teaching in Quebec. The commission's recommendations led to the creation of the Quebec's CEGEP which replaced the classical colleges. In 1967, he was made a Companion of the Order of Canada.

His funeral took place at the Notre-Dame de Québec Cathedral.
