= Jean-Paul Desbiens =

Canadian journalist and writer

Jean-Paul Desbiens FMS
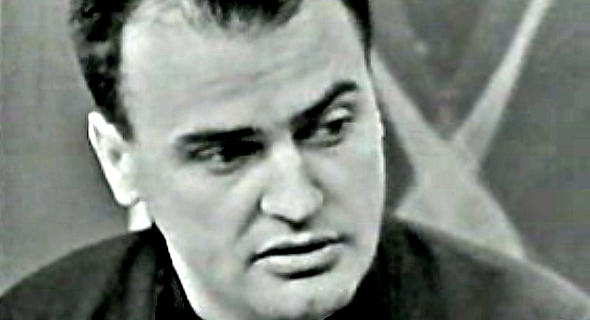
- Jean-Paul Desbiens in 1960
- Born: Jean-Paul Desbiens; March 7, 1927; Quebec
- Died: July 23, 2006 (aged 79)

Jean-Paul Desbiens, F.M.S., OC (French pronunciation: [ʒɑ̃ pɔl debjɛ̃]; March 7, 1927 – July 23, 2006) was a Quebec writer, journalist, teacher and member of the Marist Brothers.

== Biography ==
He was born at Métabetchouan in the Lac Saint-Jean region of Quebec in 1927. He joined the Marist order in 1944 and studied at the Université de Montréal and the Université Laval, graduating with a degree in philosophy in 1958. He began a teaching career in high schools of his native Lac-St-Jean region.

His 1960 book Les insolences du Frère Untel (1960) (translated as The Impertinences of Brother Anonymous, 1962), is a strong attack on the quality of public education system in Quebec. The book, which also denounces the poor quality of the spoken and written French among the younger generations, is credited by many as inspiring the Quiet Revolution in Quebec. A follow-up, Sous le soleil de la pitié (translated as For Pity's Sake: The Return of Brother Anonymous, 1965) was published in 1965.

His identity revealed and his relationship with the Catholic Church establishment strained, Desbiens left the Quebec intellectual scene and attended University of Fribourg, Switzerland, where he obtained a Ph.D. in philosophy. He later worked with the Ministry of Education in Quebec to help improve the public school and junior college programs in the province. Desbiens was chief editorial writer for La Presse from 1970 to 1972. He was also the provincial head of his religious congregation for some time. He wrote many essays, and published his personal journal. He was named an Officer of the Order of Canada in 2006.

He died in Quebec City of a heart attack on July 23, 2006, having had lung cancer.
