= Quiet Revolution =

1960s period of socio-political change in Quebec, Canada

The Quiet Revolution (French: Révolution tranquille [ʁevɔlysjõʊ̃ tʁãkɪl]) was a period of socio-political and socio-cultural transformation in French Canada, particularly in Quebec, following the 1960 Quebec general election. This period was marked by the secularization of the government, the establishment of a state-administered welfare state known as the état-providence, a shift in political alignment toward federalist and separatist (or sovereignist) factions (each faction influenced by Quebec nationalism), and the eventual election of a pro-sovereignty provincial government in the 1976 election. The Quiet Revolution is often associated with the efforts of the Liberal Party of Quebec's government led by Jean Lesage (elected in 1960) and, to some extent, Robert Bourassa (elected in 1970 after Daniel Johnson of the Union Nationale in 1966).

A primary change was an effort by the provincial government to assume greater control over healthcare and education, both of which had previously been under the purview of the Catholic Church. To achieve this, the government established ministries of Health and Education, expanded the public service, made substantial investments in the public education system, and permitted the unionization of the civil service. Additionally, measures were taken to enhance Quebecois control over the province's economy, including the nationalization of electricity production and distribution through Hydro-Québec, and the creation of the Canada/Québec Pension Plan. These policies resulted in significant economic and social development.

Furthermore, during this period, French Canadians in Quebec adopted the term Québécois to distinguish themselves from both the rest of Canada and France, solidifying their identity as a reformed province, and triggering a rise of Quebecois nationalism.

The Quiet Revolution was most impactful in Montreal, Quebec's principal city. However, its influence extended across the country and throughout contemporary Canadian politics. This transformation coincided with similar developments occurring in the Western world in general.

== Origins ==
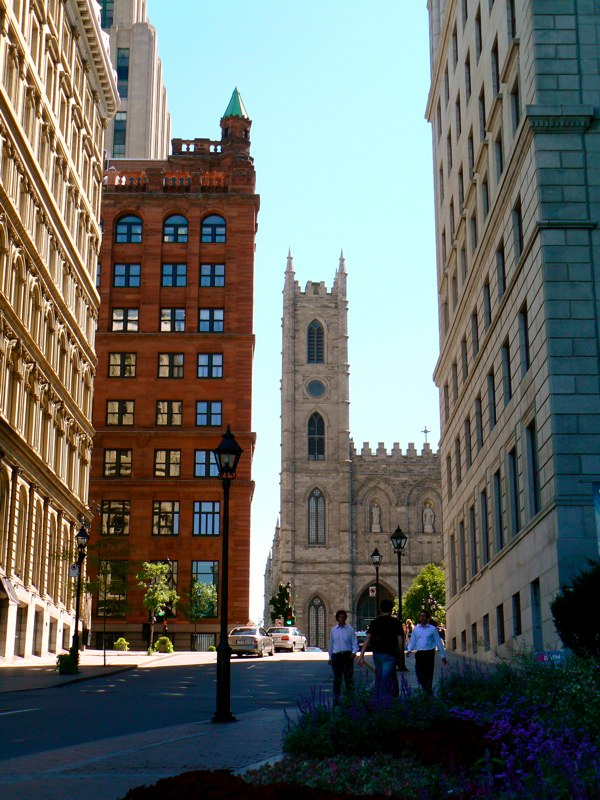
The hill leading to Place d'Armes in Montreal, an important historic site of French Canada

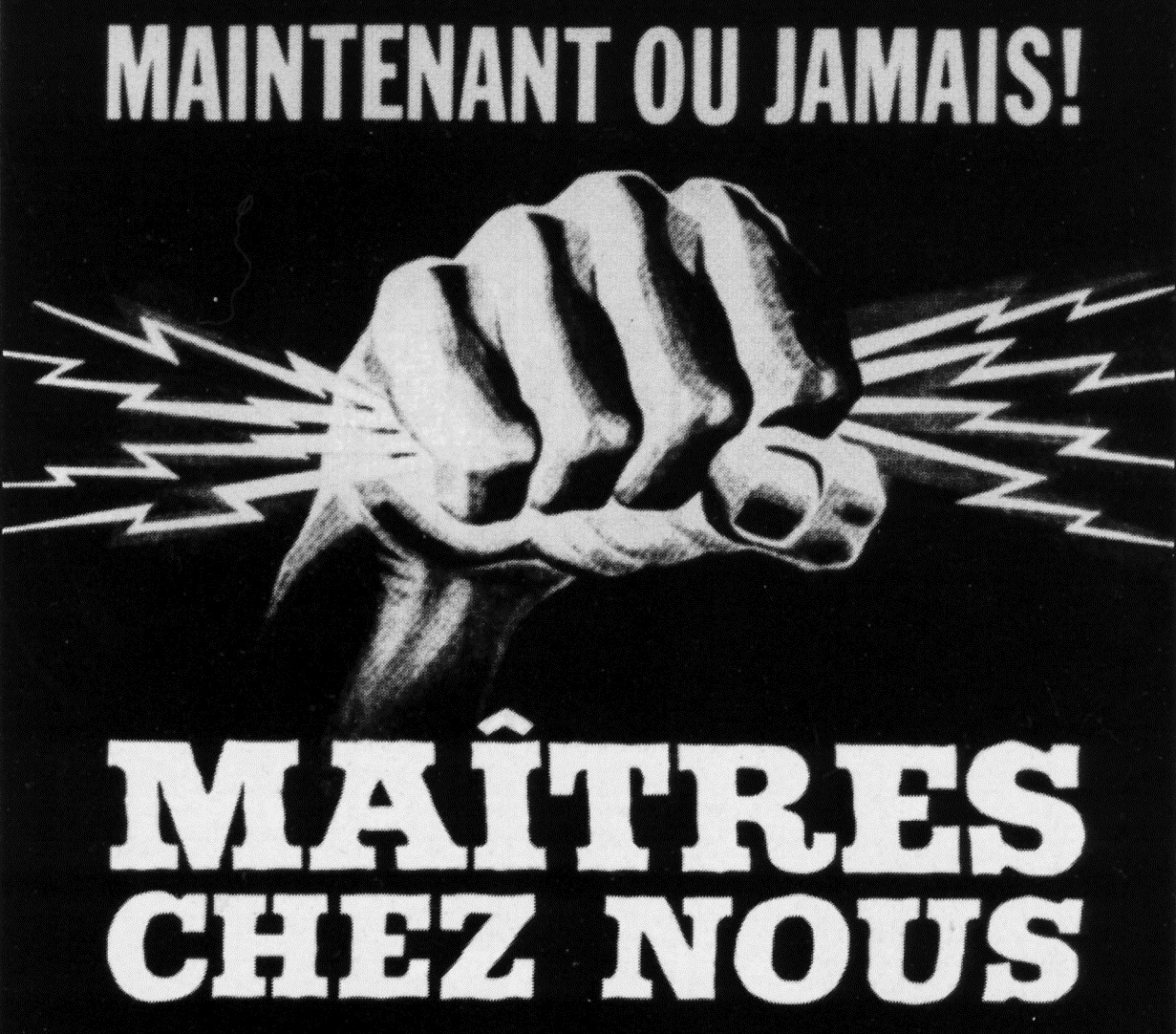
"Maîtres chez nous" ('Masters in Our Own Home') was the electoral slogan of the Liberal Party during the 1962 election.

The 1950s tenure of Quebec Premier Maurice Duplessis (August 30, 1944 – September 7, 1959) epitomized the conservative ideal of a religiously and culturally pure Québec, and became known among liberals as the Grande Noirceur ('Great Darkness'), although the Richard Riot of 1955 may have signaled growing submerged forces. Soon after Duplessis' death, the June 1960 provincial election installed the Liberal provincial government of Jean Lesage, and the Quiet Revolution began.

Prior to the 1960s, the government of Québec was controlled by the conservative Duplessis, leader of the Union Nationale party. Not all the Catholic Church supported Duplessis – some Catholic unions and members of the clergy criticized him, including Montreal Archbishop Joseph Charbonneau – but the bulk of the small-town and rural clergy supported him. Some quoted the Union Nationale slogan Le ciel est bleu, l'enfer est rouge ('The sky (Heaven) is blue, Hell is red') as a reference to the colours of the Union Nationale (blue) and the Liberals (red), the latter accused often of being pro-communist. Radio-Canada, the newspaper Le Devoir and political journal Cité Libre were intellectual forums for critics of the Duplessis Government.

Prior to the Quiet Revolution, the province's natural resources were developed mainly by foreign investors, such as the US-based Iron Ore Company of Canada. In the spring of 1949, a group of 5,000 asbestos miners went on strike for three months against a foreign corporation. They were supported by Joseph Charbonneau (Bishop of Montreal), the Québécois nationalist newspaper Le Devoir, and a small group of intellectuals. Until the second half of the 20th century, the majority of Francophone Québec workers lived below the poverty line, and Francophones did not join the executive ranks of the businesses of their own province. Political activist and singer Félix Leclerc wrote: "Our people are the waterboys of their own country".

In many ways, Duplessis's death in September 1959, quickly followed by the sudden death of his successor Paul Sauvé on January 2, 1960, triggered the Quiet Revolution. The Liberal Party, led by Jean Lesage and campaigning under the slogans Il faut que ça change ("Things have to change") and Maîtres chez nous ("Masters of our own house", a phrase coined by Le Devoir editor André Laurendeau), was voted into power within a year of Duplessis's death.

It is generally accepted that the revolution ended before the October Crisis of 1970, but Québec society has continued to change dramatically since then, notably with the rise of the sovereignty movement, evidenced by the election of the sovereigntist Parti Québécois (first in 1976 by René Lévesque), the formation of a sovereigntist political party representing Québec on the federal level, the Bloc Québécois (founded in 1991 by Lucien Bouchard), as well as the 1980 and 1995 sovereignty referendums. Some scholars argue that the rise of the Québec sovereignty movement during the 1970s is also part of this period.

== Secularization and education ==
The Canadian Constitution of 1867 made education the responsibility of the province. Québec set up a Ministry of Public Instruction in 1868 but abolished it in 1875 under pressure from the Catholic Church. The clergy believed it would be able to provide appropriate teaching to young people and that the province should not interfere. By the early 1960s, there were more than 1,500 school boards, each responsible for its own programs, textbooks and the recognition of diplomas according to its own criteria.

In addition, until the Quiet Revolution, higher education was accessible to only a minority of French Canadians because of the generally low level of formal education and the expense involved. Moreover, secondary schools had placed a lot more emphasis on the liberal arts and soft sciences than the hard sciences.

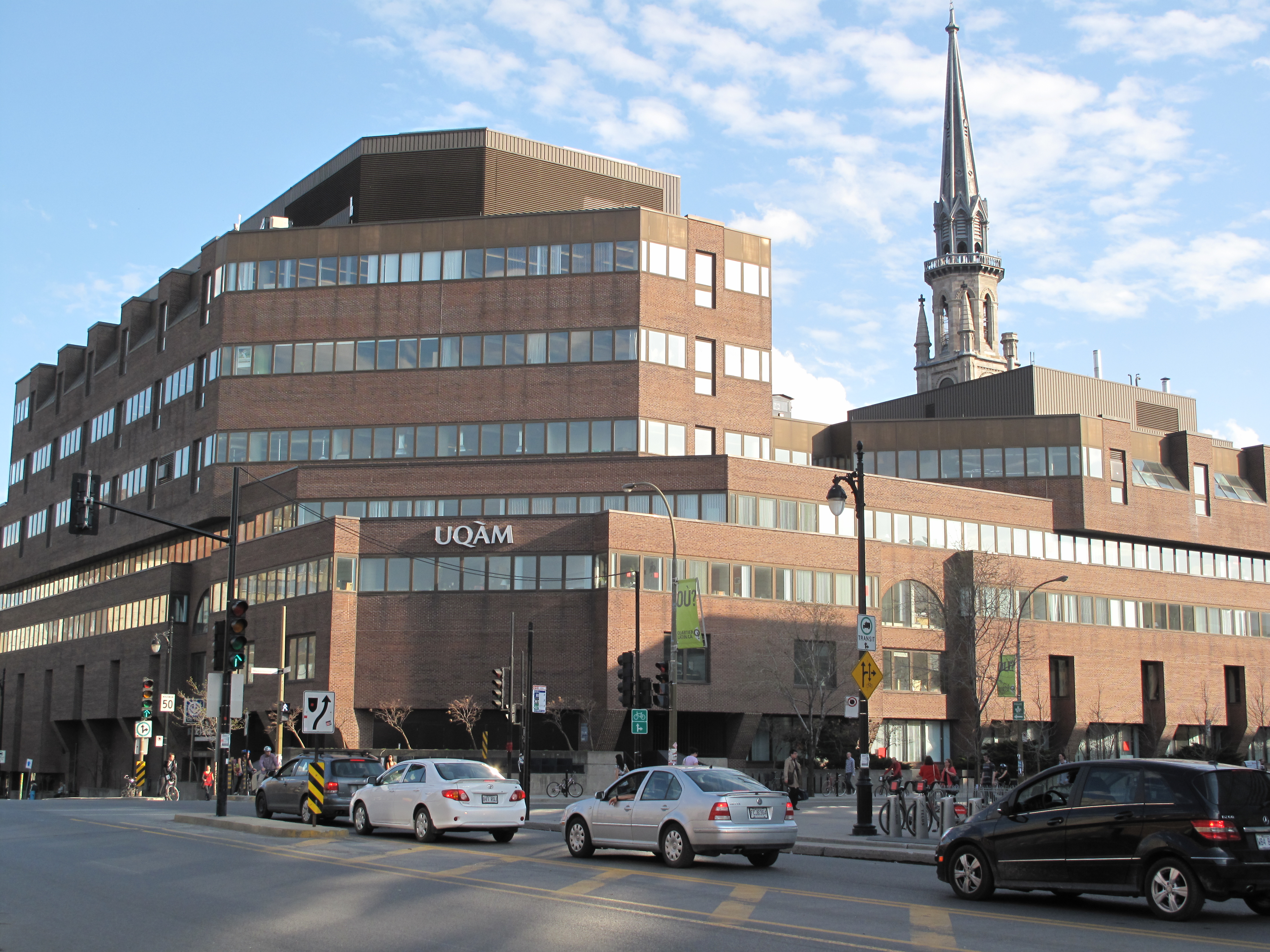
Université du Québec à Montréal

Following World War II, while most of the United States and Canada was enjoying a long period of prosperity and modernization, economic growth was slower in Québec. The level of formal schooling among French-Canadians was quite low: only 13% finished grade 11, as opposed to 36% of English Canadians. One of the most scathing attacks on the educational system was levelled by Brother Jean-Paul Desbiens, writing under the pseudonym of Frère Untel. The publication of his book Les insolences du Frère Untel (1960) quickly sold over 100,000 copies and has come to be recognized as having important impact on the beginning of the Quiet Revolution.

Alphonse-Marie Parent presided over a commission established in 1961 to study the education system and bring forth recommendations, which eventually led to the adoption of several reforms, the most important of which was secularization of the education system. In 1964 a Ministry of Education was established with Paul Gérin-Lajoie appointed the first Minister of Education since 1875. Although schools maintained their Catholic or Protestant character, in practice they became secular institutions. Reforms included raising the age for compulsory schooling from 14 to 16; providing free schooling until the grade 11; reorganizing school boards; standardizing school curricula; and replacing classical colleges, first with CEGEPs (publicly funded pre‑university colleges) in 1965, then the Université du Québec network in 1969. The reforms were an effort to improve access to higher education, geographically and financially. Additionally, more emphasis was placed on the hard sciences, and there was now work for the Québécois who had previously needed to leave the province in order to find jobs in their preferred fields. For example, the opening of Hydro-Québec meant that skilled engineers needed to be hired.

Also during this period the Ministry of Social Affairs was created, which in June 1985 became the Ministry of Health and Social Services, responsible for the administration of health and social services in the province.

The Quiet Revolution combined declericalization with the radicalized implementation of Vatican II. There was a dramatic change in the role of nuns, which previously had attracted 2–3% of Québec's young women. Many left the convent while very few young women entered. The Provincial government took over the nuns' traditional role as provider of many of Québec's educational and social services. Often ex-nuns continued the same roles in civilian dress; and for the first time men started entering the teaching profession.

Also during the time of the Quiet Revolution, Quebec experienced a large drop in the total fertility rate (known as TFR: the lifetime average number of live births per woman of child-bearing age) falling from 3.8 in 1960 to 1.9 in 1970. According to a study commissioned in 2007 by the Québec Ministry of Families, Seniors and Status of Women on possible ways to address problems related to a by then even lower TFR (1.6) "Starting in 1960, Québec experienced a drop in fertility that was so sharp and rapid, it was almost unparalleled in the developed countries."

The 2003 article "Where Have All the Children Gone?", published in the academic journal Canadian Studies in Population by Professor Catherine Krull of Queen's University and Professor Frank Trovato of the University of Alberta, points out the decline in influence of the Catholic Church over the lives of French-Canadians as one of the causes of the great reduction in the TFR during the Quiet Revolution. According to Professor Claude Belanger of Montreal's Marianopolis College, the loss of influence of the Catholic Church and subsequent abandonment of long adhered-to Church teachings concerning procreation was a key factor in Quebec going from having the highest provincial birth rate in 1960 to the lowest in 1970.

On March 28, 1969, a significant street demonstration took place in Montreal, known as Opération McGill français. The primary objective of this protest was to advocate for McGill University to become a French-speaking educational institution.

== Economic reforms ==
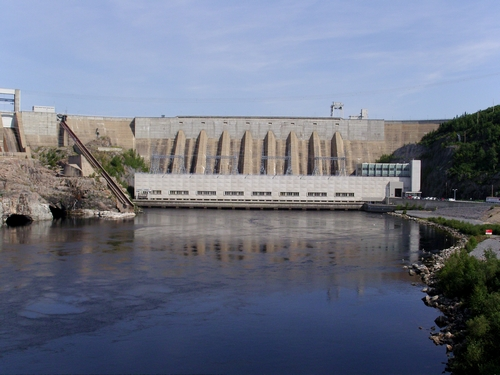
Hydro-Québec's Jean-Lesage generating station, formerly known as Manic-2, built between 1961 and 1965.

Seeking a mandate for its most daring reform, the nationalization of the province's electric companies under Hydro-Québec, the Liberal Party called for a new election in 1962. The Liberal party was returned to power with an increased majority in the Legislative Assembly of Québec and within six months, René Lévesque, Minister of Natural Resources, enacted his plans for Hydro-Québec. The Hydro-Québec project grew to become an important symbol in Québec. It demonstrated the strength and initiative of the Québec government and was a symbol of the ingenuity of Québécois in their capability to complete such an ambitious project. The original Hydro-Québec project ushered in an era of "megaprojects" that would continue until 1984, seeing Québéc's hydroelectric network grow and become a strong pillar of the province. Today, Hydro-Québec remains a crucial element to the Québec economy, with annual revenues of $12.7 billion Canadian dollars, $1.1 billion going directly into the province's coffers.

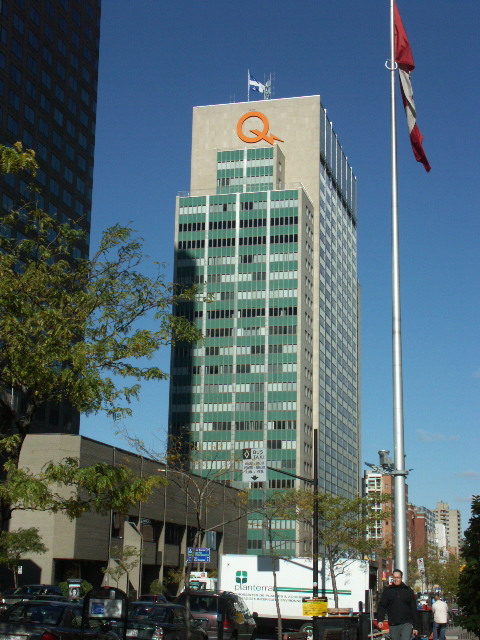
Hydro-Québec headquarters in Montréal

More public institutions were created to follow through with the desire to increase the province's economic autonomy. The public companies SIDBEC (iron and steel), SOQUEM (mining), REXFOR (forestry) and SOQUIP (petroleum) were created to exploit the province's natural resources. This was a massive shift away from the Duplessis era in which Québec's abundant natural resources were hardly utilized. Duplessis' policy was to sell off untransformed natural resources at bargain prices in order to create more employment in Québec's regions. This strategy, however, proved weak as Québec's natural resources were exploited for little profit. The shift in mentality of the Quiet Revolution allowed Québec to gain further financial autonomy by accessing this area of the economy which, as evidenced by Hydro-Québec, is extremely profitable. The Société générale de financement (General financing corporation) was created in 1962 to encourage Québécois to invest in their economic future and to increase the profitability of small companies. In 1963, in conjunction with the Canada Pension Plan the government of Canada authorized the province to create its own Régie des Rentes du Québec (RRQ, 'Québec Pension Plan'); universal contributions came into effect in 1966. The Caisse de dépôt et placement du Québec (CDPQ, 'Québec Deposit and Investment Fund') was created in 1965 to manage the considerable revenues generated by the RRQ and to provide the capital necessary for various projects in the public and private sectors.

A new labour code (Code du Travail) was adopted in 1964. It made unionizing much easier and gave public employees the right to strike. It was during the same year that the Code Civil ('Civil Code') was modified to recognize the legal equality of spouses. In case of divorce, the rules for administering the Divorce Act were retained using Québéc's old community property matrimonial regime until 1980, when new legislation brought an automatic equal division of certain basic family assets between spouses.

== Nationalism ==
The societal and economic innovations of the Quiet Revolution, which empowered Québec society, emboldened certain nationalists to push for political independence. While visiting Montreal for Expo 67, General Charles de Gaulle proclaimed Vive le Québec libre! in a speech at Montreal City Hall, which gave the Québec independence movement further public credibility. In 1968, the sovereigntist Parti Québécois was created, with René Lévesque as its leader. A small faction of Marxist sovereignists began terrorist actions as the Front de libération du Québec, the zenith of their activities being the 1970 October Crisis, during which British diplomat James Cross as well as Labour Minister Pierre Laporte were both kidnapped by FLQ cells, with Laporte eventually being killed.

The Parti Québécois twice led the Québécois people through unsuccessful referendums, the first in 1980 on the question of political sovereignty with economic association to Canada (also known as sovereignty association), and the second in 1995 on full sovereignty.

In 1977, during their first term in office, the Parti Québécois enacted the Charter of the French Language, known more commonly as Bill 101, whose goal is to protect the French language by making it the language of business in Québec, as well as restricting the use of English on signs. The bill also restricted the eligibility for elementary and high school students to attend school in English, allowing this only for children of parents who had studied in English in Québec. Children may also be eligible for English education if their parents or grandparents received a certain amount of English education outside of the province (ex. another Canadian province). Once a child has been permitted to attend an English primary or high school, the remaining children in that family are also granted access. This bill still stands today, although many reforms have been made in an attempt to make it less harsh.

== Historiography ==
Several historians have studied the Quiet Revolution, presenting somewhat different interpretations of the same basic facts. For example, Cuccioletta and Lubin raised the question of whether it was an unexpected revolution or an inevitable evolution of society. Behiels asked, how important are economic factors such as outside control of Québec's finance and industry? Was the motivating force one of liberalism or one of nationalism? Gauvreau raised the issues of religious factors, and of the changes going on inside the Catholic Church. Seljak felt that the Catholic Church could have responded with a more vocal opposition.

=== Interpretations of the Change ===
Modern Québec historians have brought some nuance to the importance of the Quiet Revolution. Though the improvements made to Québec society during this era make it seem like an extremely innovative period, it has been posited that these changes follow a logical revolutionary movement occurring throughout the Western world in the 1960s. Québec historian Jacques Rouillard took this revisionist stance in arguing that the Quiet Revolution may have accelerated the natural evolution of Quebec's francophone society rather than having turned it on its head.

Several arguments support this view. From an economic perspective, Quebec's manufacturing sector had seen important growth since the Industrial Revolution. Buoyed by significant manufacturing demand during World War I and World War II, the Québec economy was already expanding before the events of the Quiet Revolution.

Rouillard also argues that traditional portrayals of the Quiet Revolution falsely depict it as the rise of Liberalism in Québec. He notes the popularity enjoyed by federal Liberal Prime Minister Sir Wilfrid Laurier as well as the Premiership of Adélard Godbout as examples of Québec Liberalism prior to the events of the Quiet Revolution. The Godbout administration was extremely innovative. Its achievements include nationalizing the electricity distribution network of the city of Montreal, granting universal suffrage, instituting mandatory schooling until the age of 14 and establishing various social programs in Québec.

The perception of the Quiet Revolution as a great upheaval in Québec society persists, but the revisionist argument that describes this period as a natural continuation of innovations already occurring in Québec cannot be omitted from any discussion on the merits of the Quiet Revolution. The historiography of the period has been notably explored by Ronald Rudin, who describes the legacy of the Lesage years in the depiction of what preceded them. Though criticized as apologists for Duplessis, Robert Rumilly and Conrad Black did add complexity to the narrative of neo-nationalists by contesting the concept of a Grande Noirceur, the idea that Duplessis's tenure in office was one of reactionary policies and politics. Dale Thomson, for his part, noted that Jean Lesage, far from seeking to dismantle the traditional order, negotiated a transition with (and sought to accommodate) Québéc's Catholic Church. Several scholars have lately sought to mediate the neo-nationalist and revisionist schools by looking at grassroots Catholic activism and the Church's involvement in policy-making.

==== Federal politics ====
Politics at the federal level were also in flux. In 1957, the federal government passed the Hospital Insurance and Diagnostic Services Act. This was, effectively, the beginning of a pan-Canadian system of publicly funded health care. In 1961, Prime Minister Diefenbaker instituted the National Hospital Insurance Plan, the first public health insurance plan adhered to by all the provinces. In 1966, the National Medicare program was created.

Federal politics were further influenced by the election of Pierre Elliot Trudeau in 1968. The rise to power of arguably Canada's most influential Prime Minister was unique in Canadian politics. The charisma and charm he displayed throughout his whirlwind campaign swept up much of the country in what would be referred to as Trudeaumania. Before the end of the 1960s, Trudeau would pass the Official Languages Act (1969), which aimed to ensure that all federal government services were available in both of Canada's official languages. By the end of the 1960s, Trudeau had also passed legislation decriminalizing homosexuality and certain types of abortion.

==== Municipal politics ====
Montreal municipal politics were also going through an important upheaval. Jean Drapeau became Montreal mayor on October 24, 1960. Within the first few years of his tenure, Drapeau oversaw a series of infrastructure projects, including the expansion of Dorval airport (now Montréal–Pierre Elliott Trudeau International Airport), the opening of the Champlain bridge and the renaissance of Old Montreal. He also oversaw the construction and inauguration of Place des Arts. Drapeau was also instrumental in the construction of the Montreal metro system, which was inaugurated on October 14, 1966. Under Drapeau, Montreal was awarded the 1967 International and Universal Exposition (Expo 67), whose construction he oversaw. He was also one of the key politicians responsible for the National League of baseball granting Montreal a franchise, the Montreal Expos, since relocated in 2005 to Washington D.C. as the Washington Nationals. Another of Drapeau's major projects was obtaining and holding the 1976 Summer Olympics.

== Important figures ==
- Lucien Bouchard
- Pierre Bourgault
- Thérèse Casgrain
- Michel Chartrand
- Jean Drapeau
- Maurice Duplessis
- Paul Gérin-Lajoie
- Eric Kierans
- Claire Kirkland-Casgrain
- Pierre Laporte
- Jean Lesage
- René Lévesque
- Gilles Vigneault

== See also ==
- Clerico-nationalism
- Quebec nationalism
- Quebec sovereignty movement
- État québécois
- Quebec politics
- Timeline of Quebec history
- 1960 Quebec general election
- Grande Noirceur
