= St. Charles Garnier College =

- French: Collège Saint-Charles-Garnier
- School Logo

Location
- 1150, boulevard René-Lévesque Ouest; Quebec City, Quebec, G1S 1V7; Canada
- Coordinates: 46°47′41″N 71°14′42″W

Information
- Type: Independent Secondary
- Motto: Motto: Scutum Veritas (Shield of Truth)
- Denomination: Roman Catholic
- Established: 1930
- Founder: Society of Jesus
- President: Jean Robitaille
- Director: Karina Hayes
- Colours: Red and Gold
- Nickname: l’Express
- Website: CollegeGarnier.qc.ca

St. Charles Garnier College (French: Collège Saint-Charles-Garnier) or Jesuit College is a private secondary school in Quebec City, Quebec. The current school was established by the Society of Jesus in 1930 and it succeeded a previous Jesuit college which was founded in 1634. It is situated on Boulevard René-Lévesque to the east of Laval University in the borough of Sainte-Foy–Sillery–Cap-Rouge. Attached to the college is the Manresa Spirituality Centre.

== History ==
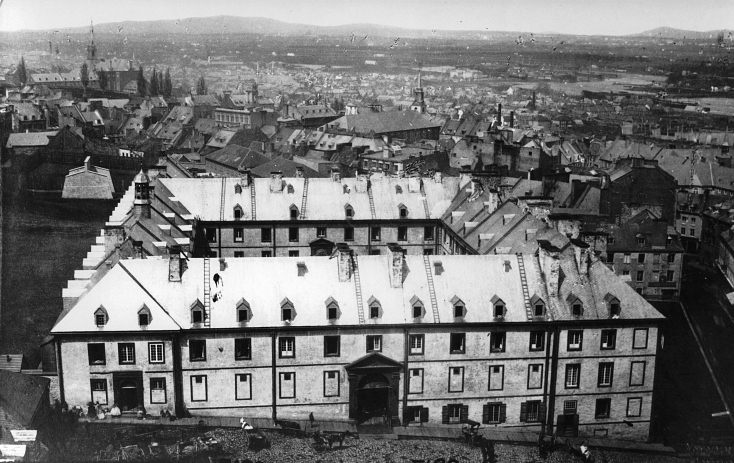
Original Jesuit College, now the City Hall

=== Origin ===
When the Jesuits came to New France they made plans to found a college. In 1634, they opened Jesuit College. It was situated on the current site of the City Hall of Quebec City. In 1648, it was replaced by a more permanent stone building. It was further expanded in 1740.

When the British rule of Quebec city began in 1759, the college was forced to close. In 1776 it was used as a barracks, and would continue to be used by the army for another 100 years. In 1878, it was demolished.

=== Foundation ===
On 4 August 1930, a new Jesuit College was opened by the Jesuits to succeed the previous one and Fr. Olivier Beaulieu SJ was the first rector. The college was affiliated with Laval University. The first classes were held in the former rectory of the nearby parish of Our Lady of the Way (demolished in 1999).

By 1935, the college had expanded to 260 students. However, the parish had been previously handed over by the Jesuits to the Archdiocese of Quebec and any land for expansion was sold off, so the college was moved to a newly constructed building. It was situated on St. Cyril Road, which was later renamed René-Lévesque Boulevard.

=== Relocation ===
On 25 September 1934, the new college building was inaugurated and the patron saint was St. Charles Garnier.

In 1944, a new parish was created near to the college also dedicated to St. Charles Garnier. On 7 August 1944, the Archbishop of Quebec, Jean-Marie-Rodrigue Villeneuve ordered the establishment of a new parish dedicated to St. Charles Garnier and the founding pastor was Canon Alphonse Morel. The church was always under the administration of the Archdiocese of Quebec and, despite its name and location, it had nothing to do with the Society of Jesus or the college.

In 1976, the Jesuits moved Villa Manresa to a building within the college grounds where it currently remains.

=== New ownership ===
In the 1970s, the Jesuits decided to hand the school over to a specially created trust which would in the future own the school. In June 1981, the new organization was created. It consisted of staff, parents, and Jesuits. It was named The College of Saint Charles Garnier to reflect the continuity at the college. On 2 July 1982 it took over administration of the school.

On 24 August 1987, the trust became the owner of the school and the Jesuit College officially became St. Charles Garnier College. It publicly made the commitment to ′use the entire building and goods exclusively for the continuation of the work of training and education at St. Charles Garnier College, in a spirit of quality and rigour in the Jesuit tradition and in the context of a private Catholic institution'.

== Notable alumni ==
- René Lévesque, premier of Quebec from 1976-1984
- Pierre Pettigrew, politician and former minister
- Stéphane Dion, former political science professor and head of Liberal Party of Canada
- Geneviève Guilbault, Deputy Premier of Quebec
- Louis Garneau, cyclist and businessman
- Luc Plamondon, lyricist
- Pascal Maeder, producer
- Robert Lepage, playwright, director and actor
- Hélène Florent, actress
- Chantal Ringuet, writer

== Notable faculty ==
- Valérie Harvey (born 1979), Canadian writer and sociologist

== Gallery ==
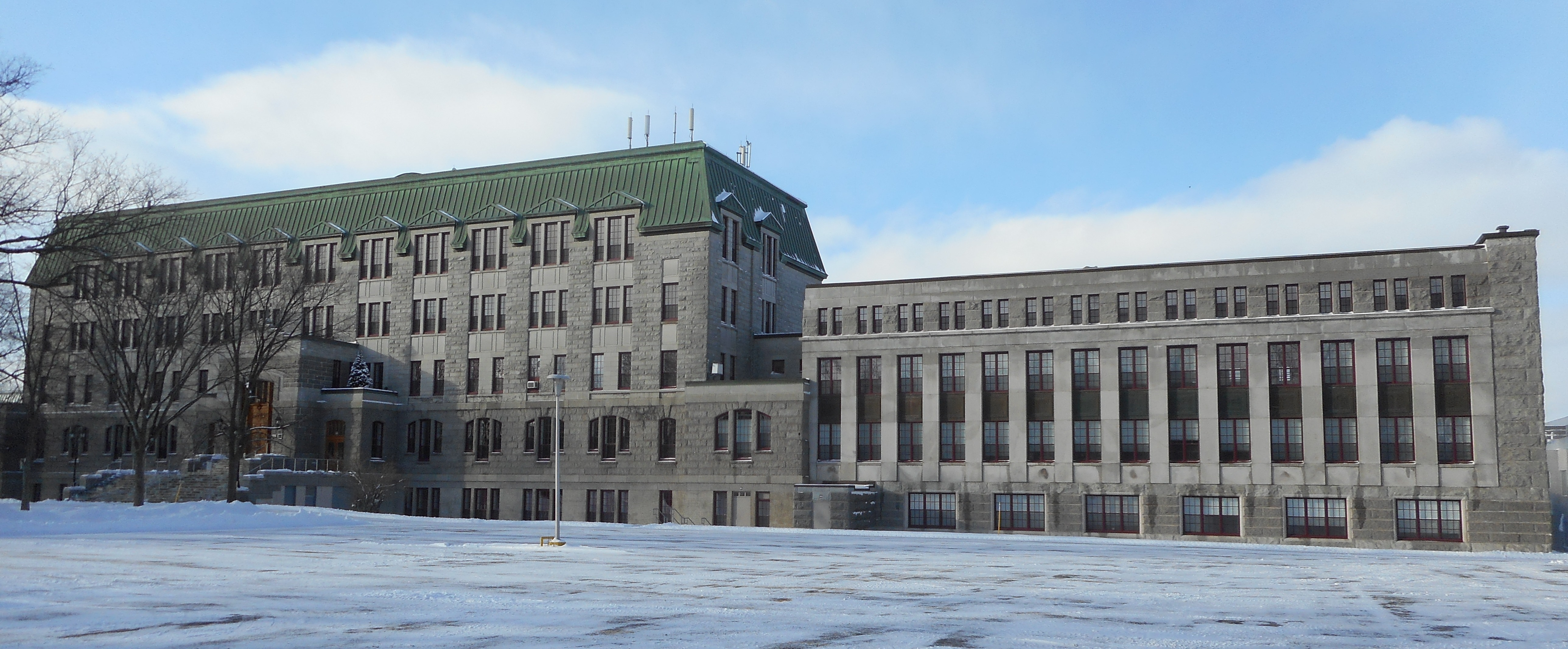
General view

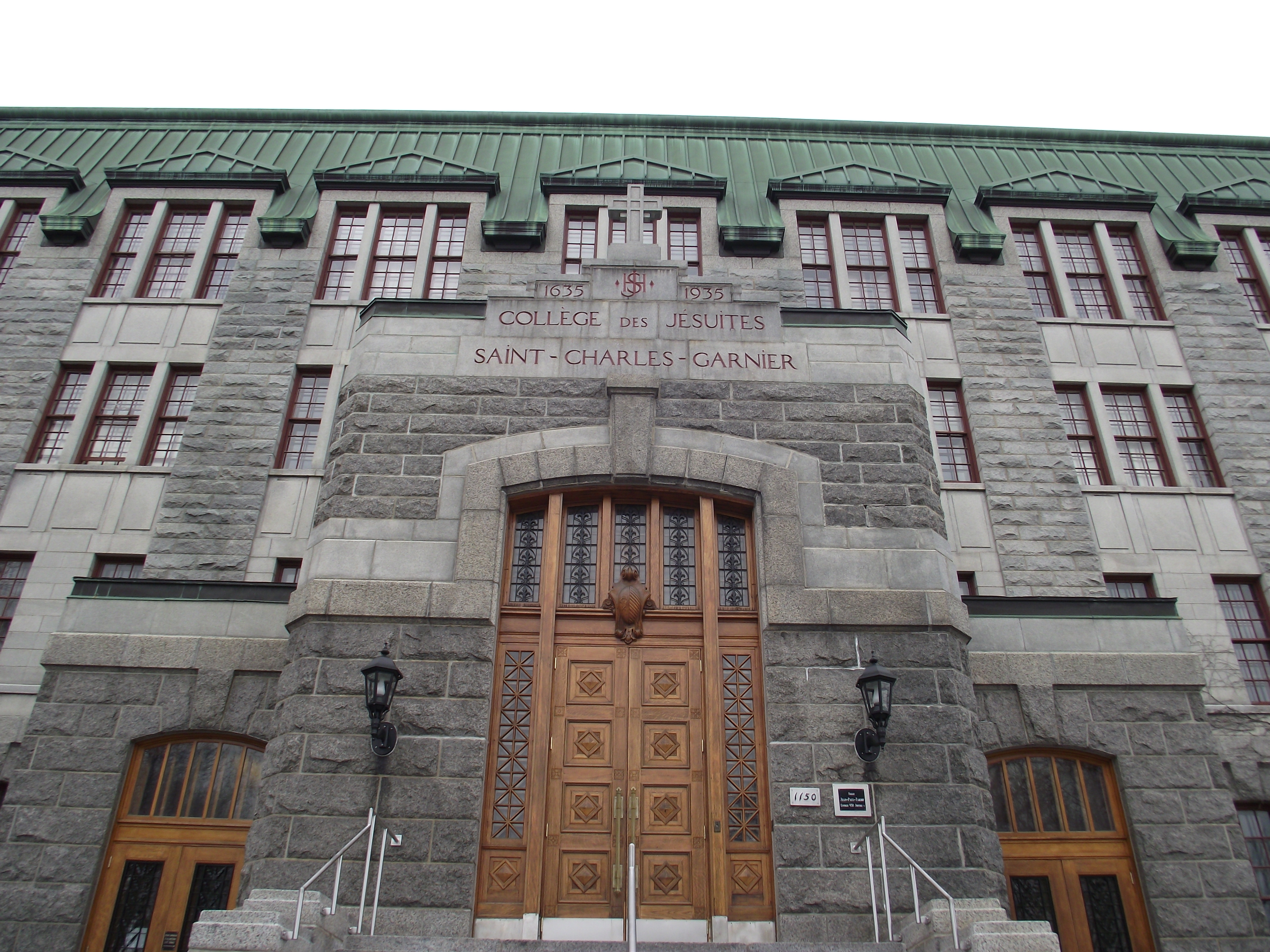
Main entrance

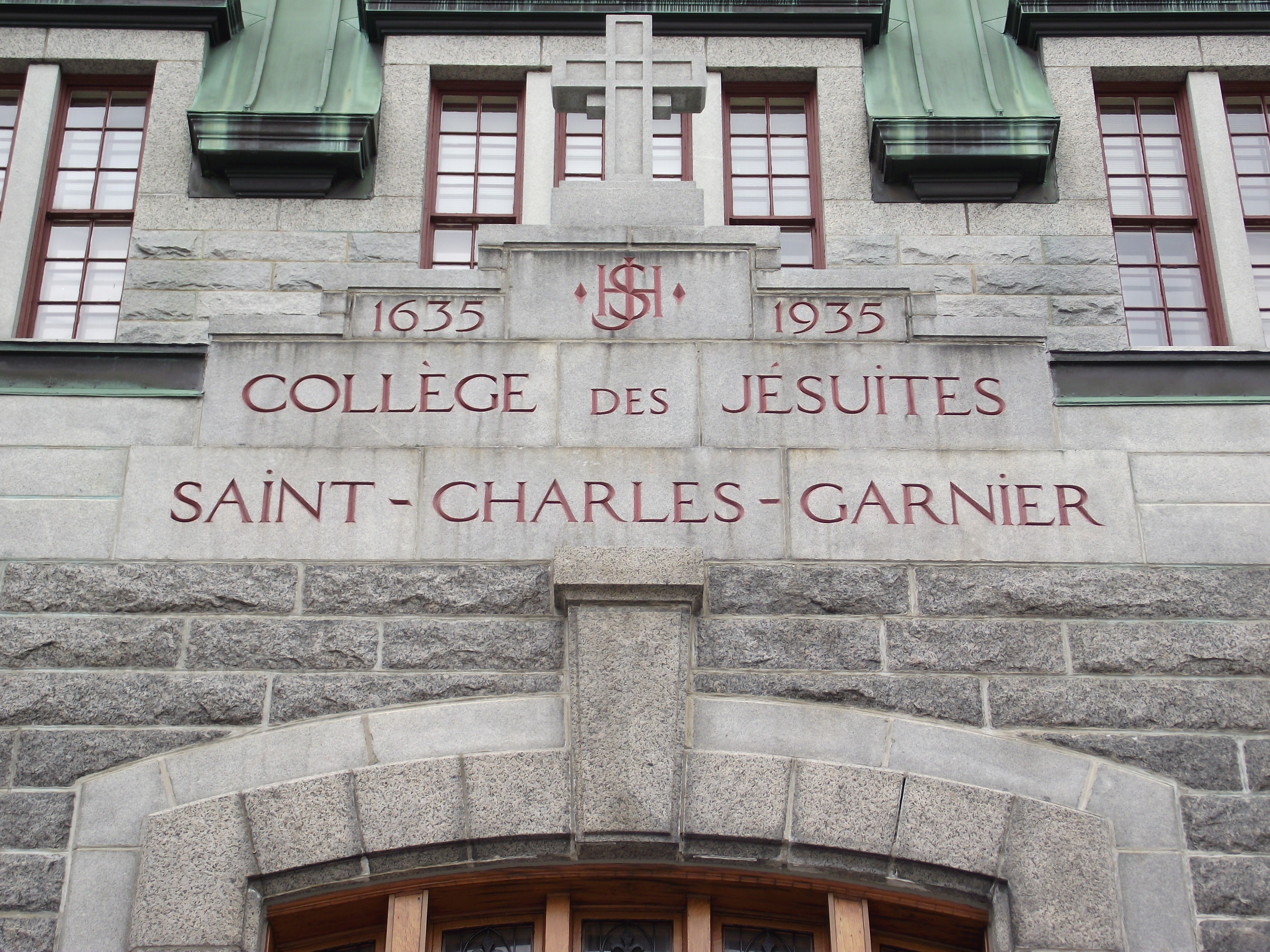
Inscription above the main entrance

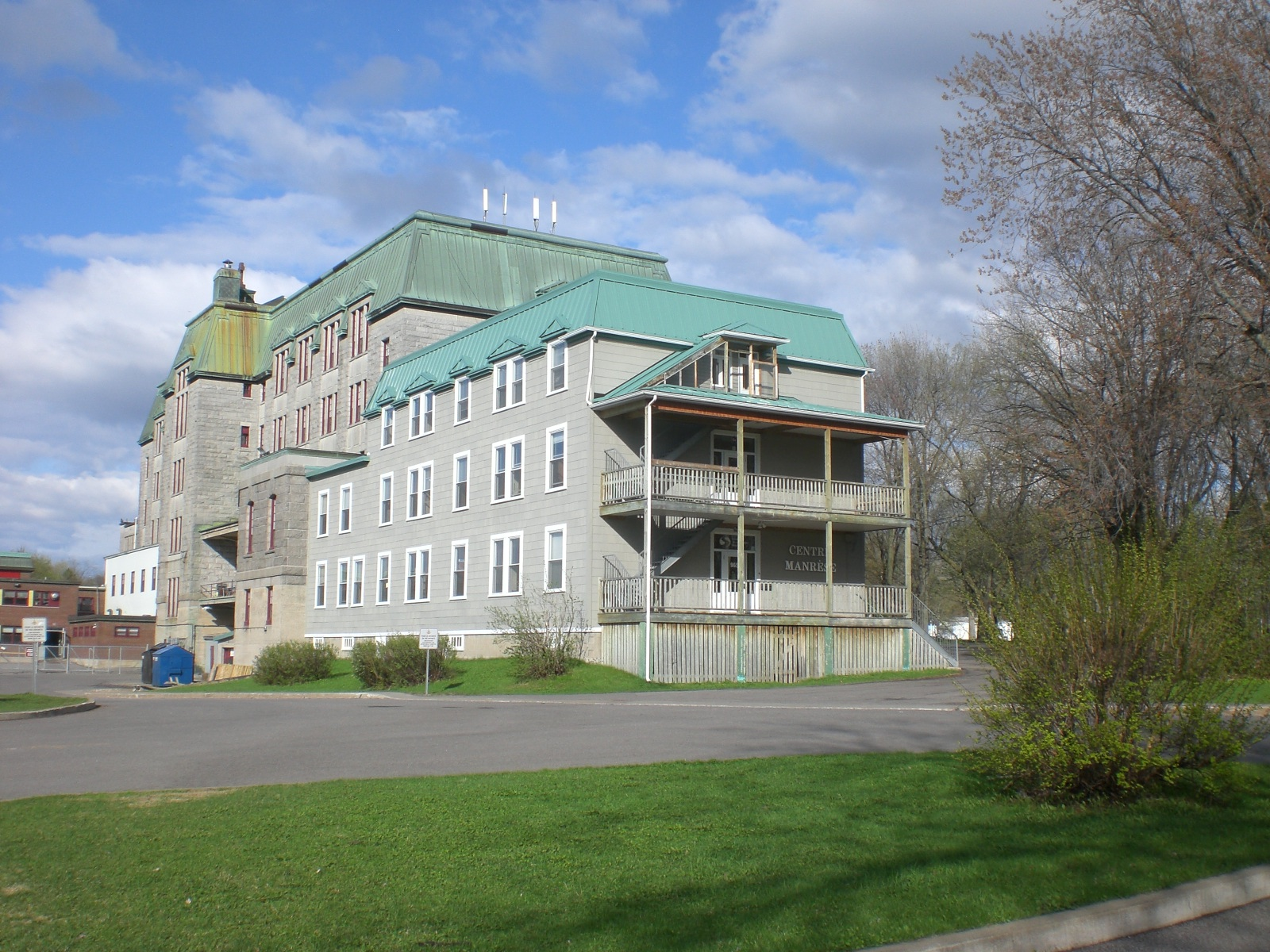
Manresa Centre with the college in the background

== See also ==
- List of Jesuit sites
- Manresa Spirituality Centre
