= Manresa Jesuit Spiritual Renewal Centre =

Coordinates: 43.854895°N 79.099385°W

Manresa Renewal Centre
- Manresa Jesuit Spiritual Renewal Centre
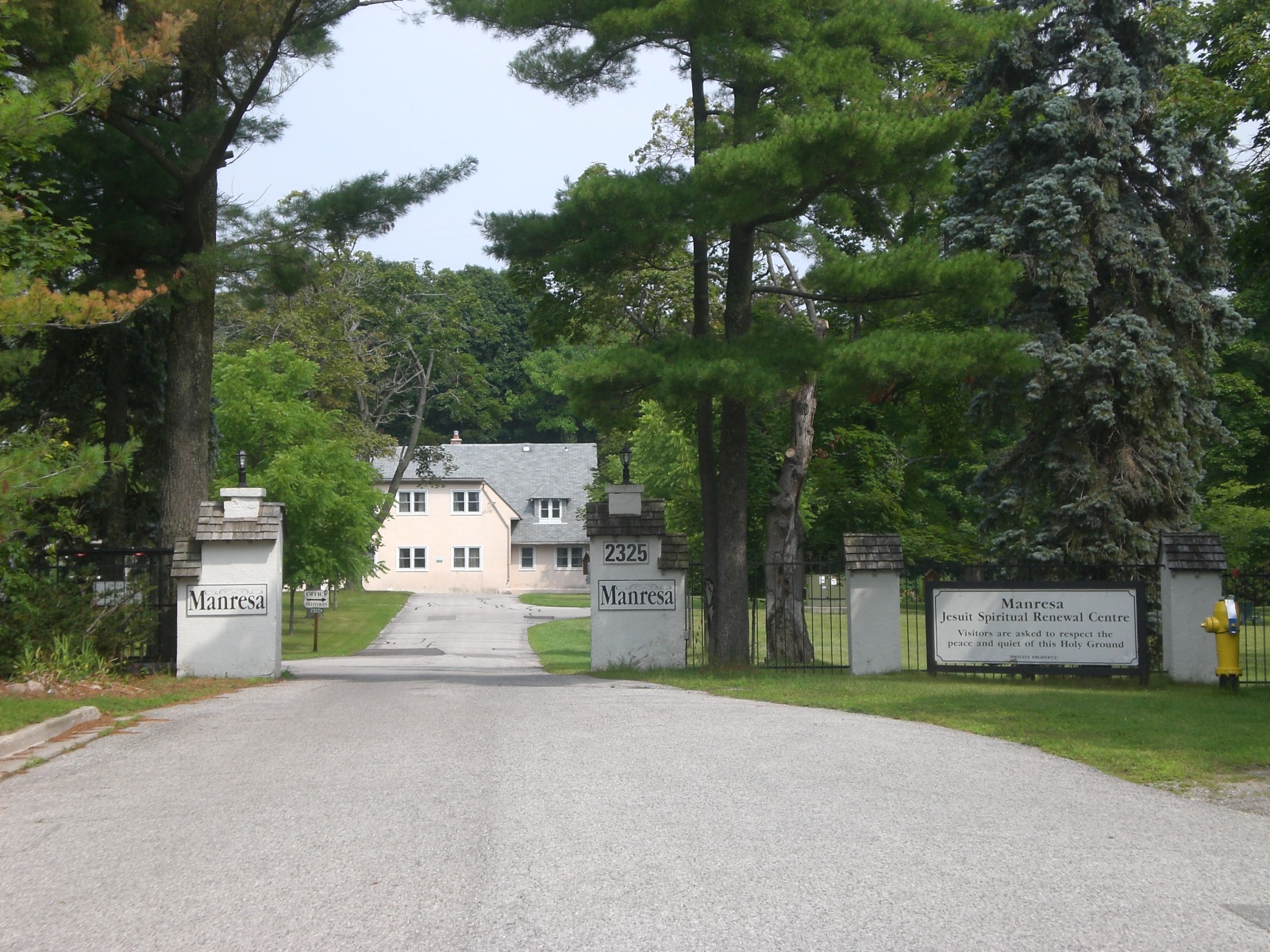
- Entrance to the centre

- Location near the Greater Toronto Area
- Location: 2325 Liverpool Road; Pickering, Ontario; L1X 1V4
- Country: Canada
- Denomination: Roman Catholic
- Website: Manresa-Canada.ca

History
- Status: Active
- Founded: 1924
- Founder: Frank Patrick O'Connor
- Dedication: Manresa

Architecture
- Functional status: Retreat centre
- Completed: 1948

Administration
- Province: Toronto
- Archdiocese: Toronto
- Deanery: Durham
- Parish: St. Isaac Jogues

Manresa Jesuit Spiritual Renewal Centre is a centre for Ignatian spirituality run by the Society of Jesus in Pickering, Ontario. It was founded in 1924 and was built in 1945. It is situated next to Pine Ridge Secondary School just off Finch Avenue in north Pickering.

== History ==
=== Foundation ===
In 1924, an advert was placed in a newspaper for the start of a lay Ignatian spirituality retreat. This was followed by a retreat in early September 1925 by thirteen men at St. Augustine's Seminary in Toronto. The organizer was Senator Frank O'Connor and Fr. John M. Filion SJ and Fr. Joseph Fallon SJ were the directors. This was followed by others retreats at the seminary, at Martyrs' Shrine in Midland and at Regis College when it was on Wellington Street.

In 1940, one wing of Regis College was converted so that retreats could be held also during the winter months. Members of the Sodality of Our Lady of the Way (which became the Christian Life Community) went on retreats at the college.

By 1945, Fr. James Fleming SJ became the director and with the number of retreatants growing decided to establish a permanent centre. A building was bought in Erindale, Mississauga. It was named the Manresa Retreat House Centre, after Manresa in Spain, where the founder of the Jesuits, Ignatius of Loyola stayed in solitude for a year. It opened in November 1946 and had accommodation for eighteen retreatants.

As soon as it opened, demand for retreats was more numerous that the centre could accommodate. Three years later the final retreat was held at Erindale. Manresa in Pickering opened its doors several days later with nineteen men on a retreat directed by Fr. Joe Clarke SJ. As there was no fixed fee, each retreatant making an offering according to his/her means. In 1990, a development committee was formed to raise funds. Over the next decade major improvements were made at the Manor House and the Retreat House parts of the centre as well as a new St. Ignatius Chapel and prayer centre were built.

=== Property ===
The property of the retreat centre was previously called Clarendon Wood. In 1912 it was purchased by Lord Hyde, George Villiers, and Lord Somers, Arthur Somers-Cocks, to be a home for the two families.

The place was originally a 100-acre farm. Lord Hyde built a large house, known as the Manor House, within the property in summer of 1912. During the construction, the lords gave a tour of the property to the Prince Arthur, Duke of Connaught and Strathearn, the third son of Queen Victoria, and his family.

Both families remained there until the outbreak of the First World War. In 1914, George Villiers became the sixth Earl of Clarendon. In 1931, he would become the Governor-General of the Union of South Africa. Lord Somers fought at Ypres in the war and in 1926 became the Governor of Victoria.

The house remained unoccupied until 1922 when it was sold to a business man, Victor Ross, a vice-president of Imperial Oil. He had the house and garden mended. In 1948, the house was sold to the Jesuits.

== Overview ==
The centre is located in north Pickering beside other Jesuit centres such as the La Storta community house and the Rene Goupil House retirement community. It has numerous buildings such as the Retreat House where the accommodation is located and the Manor House where meals are prepared. The centre hosts retreats based on the Spiritual Exercises of Ignatius of Loyola.

== House and grounds ==
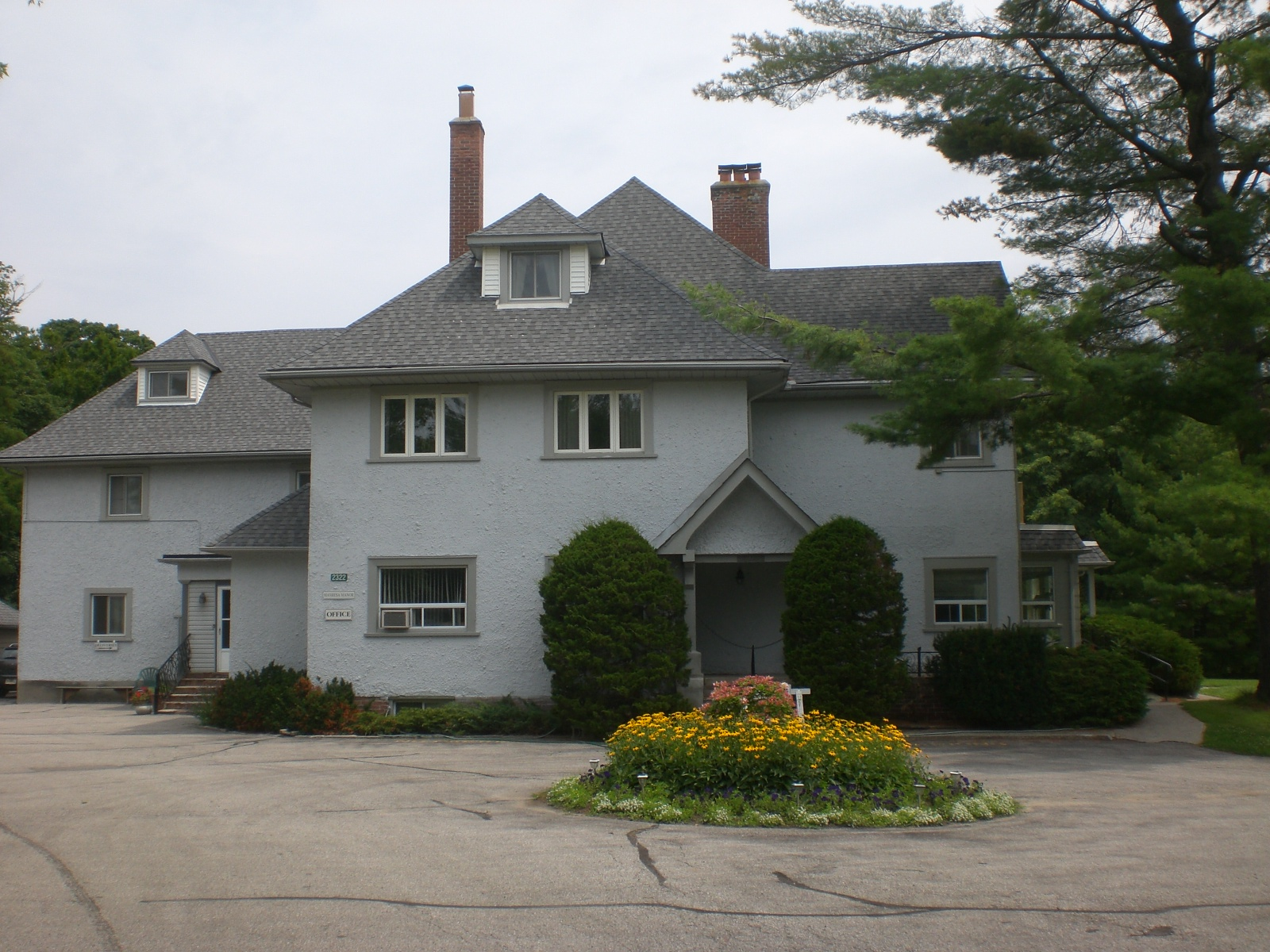
Manor House

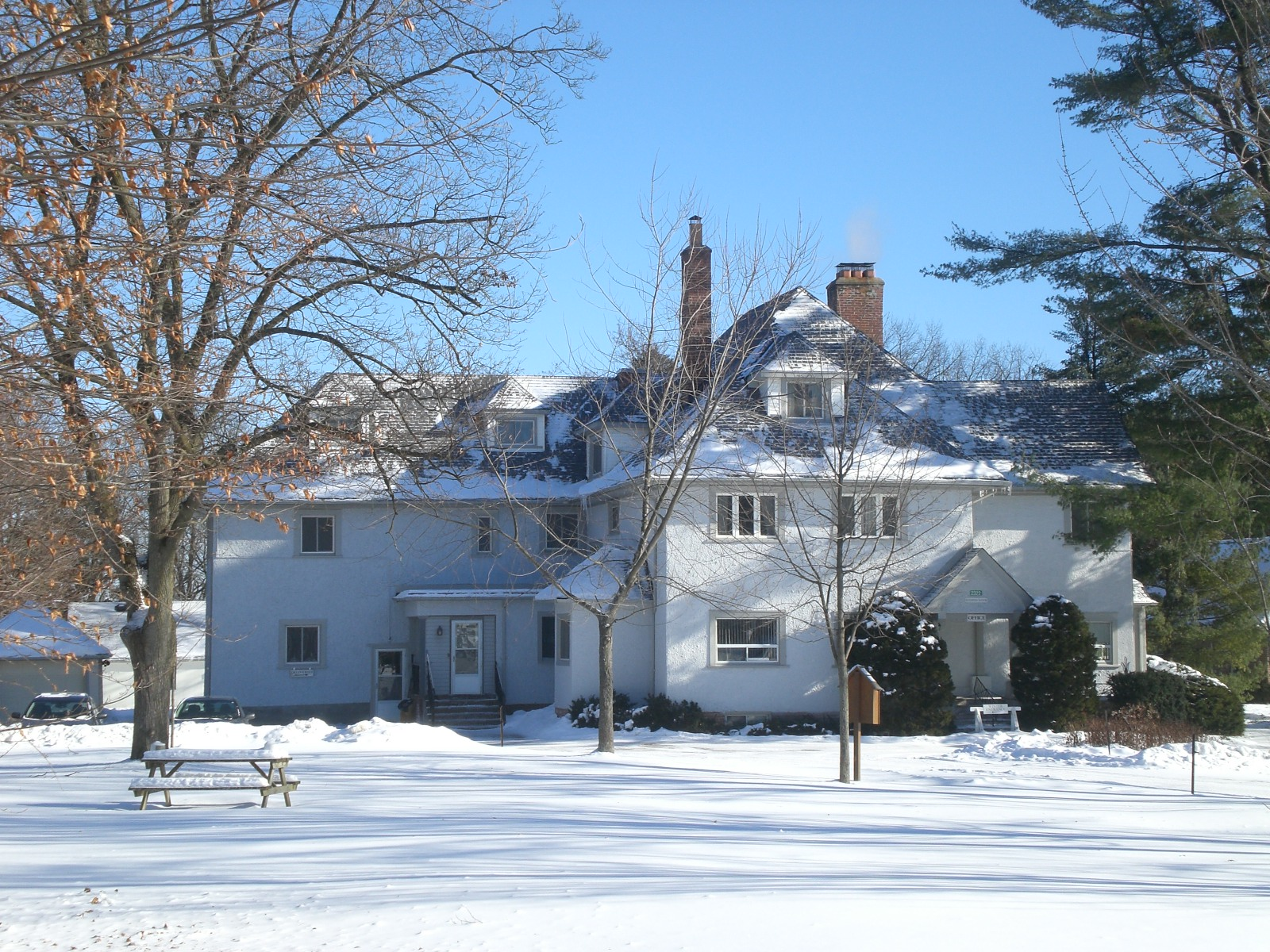
Manor house in winter

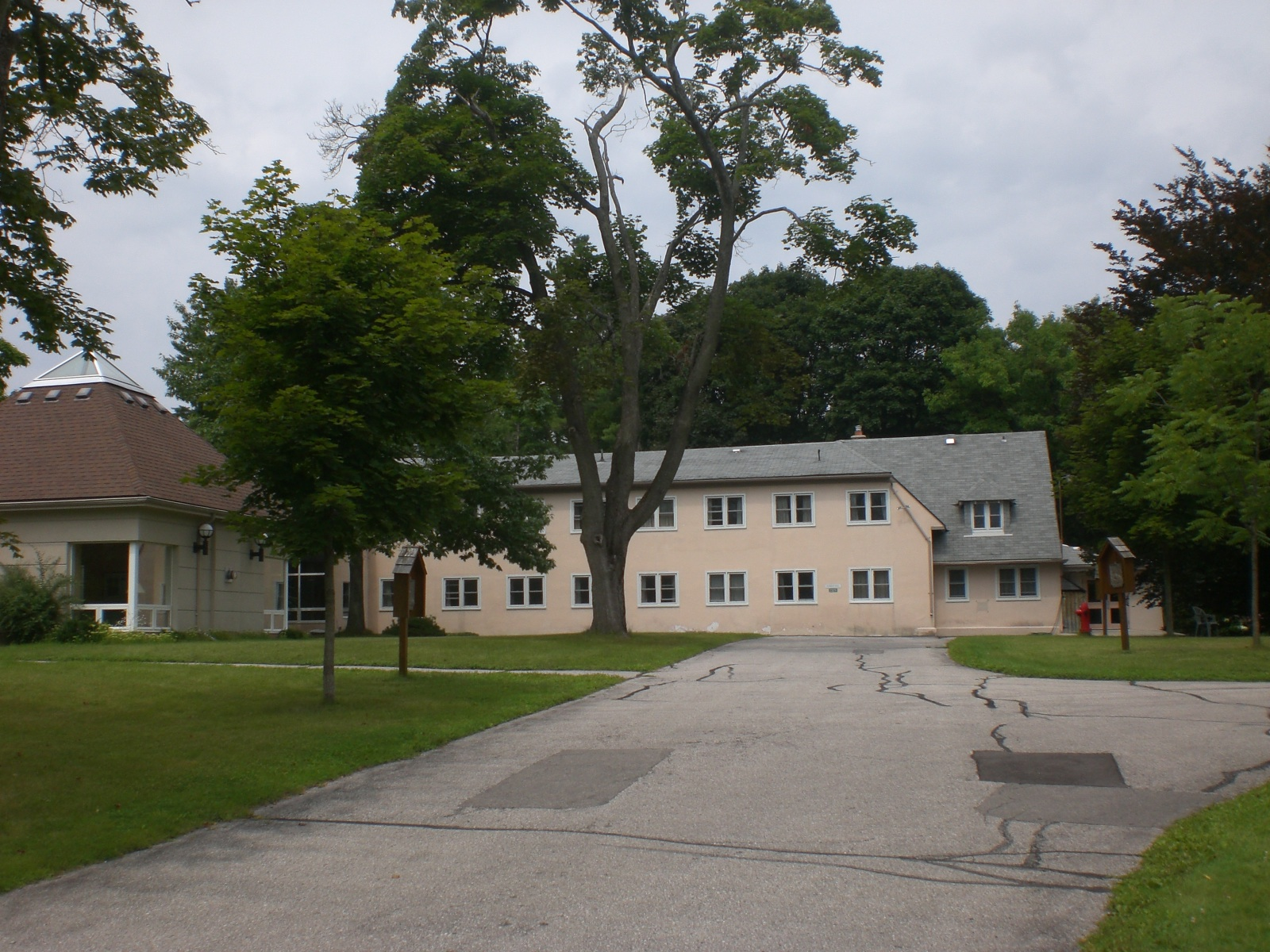
Retreat house

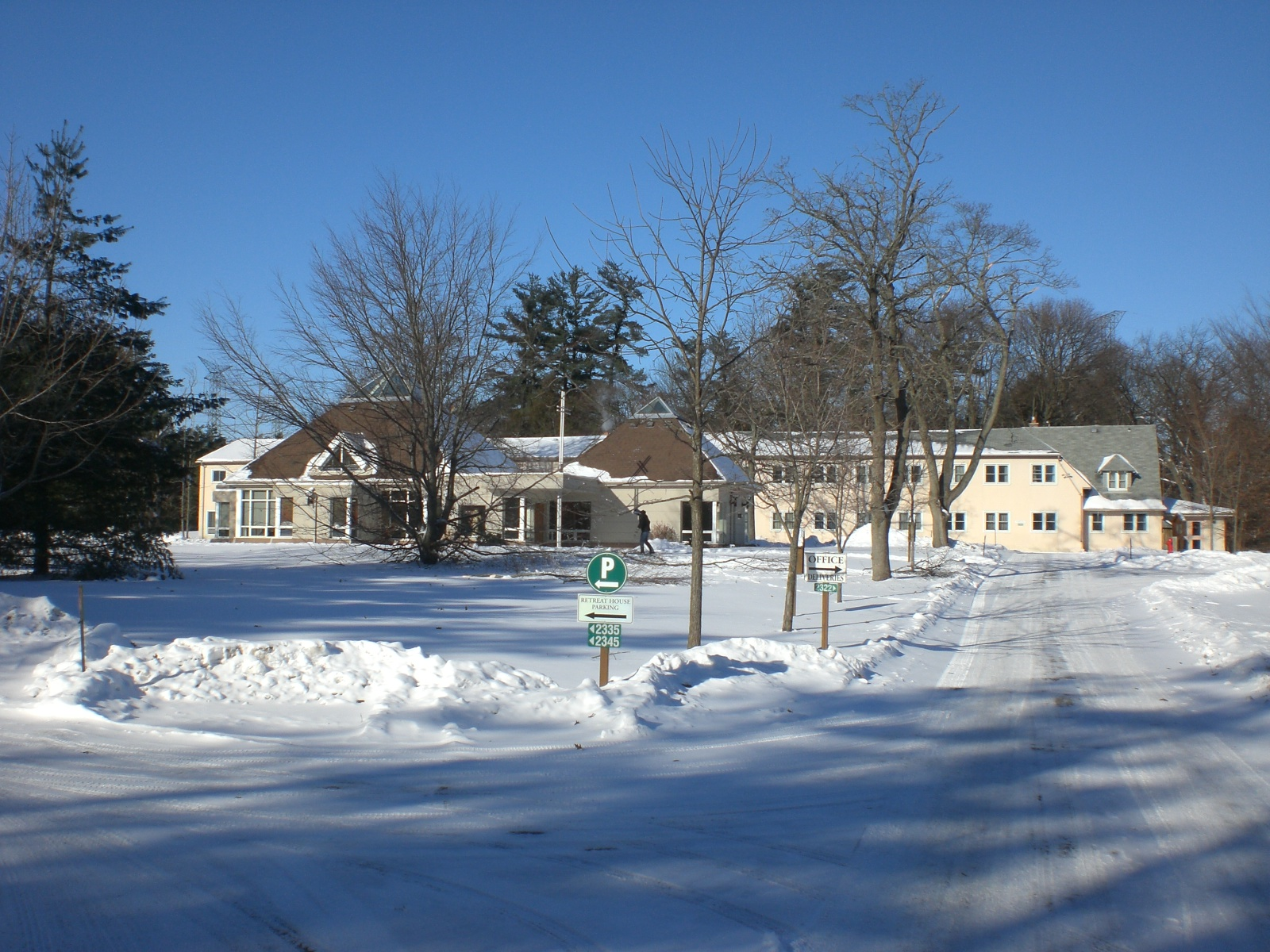
Retreat house in winter

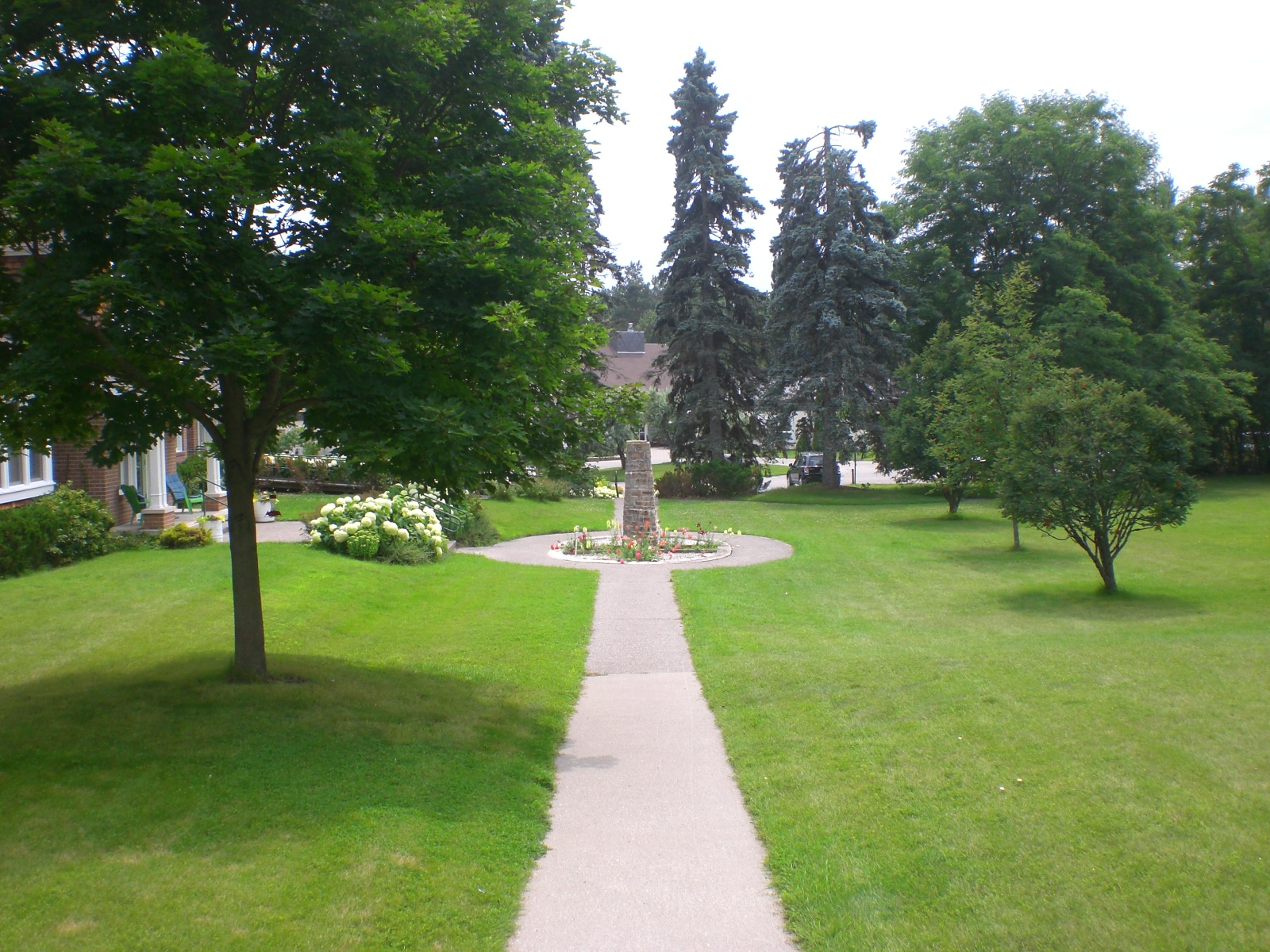
Small garden

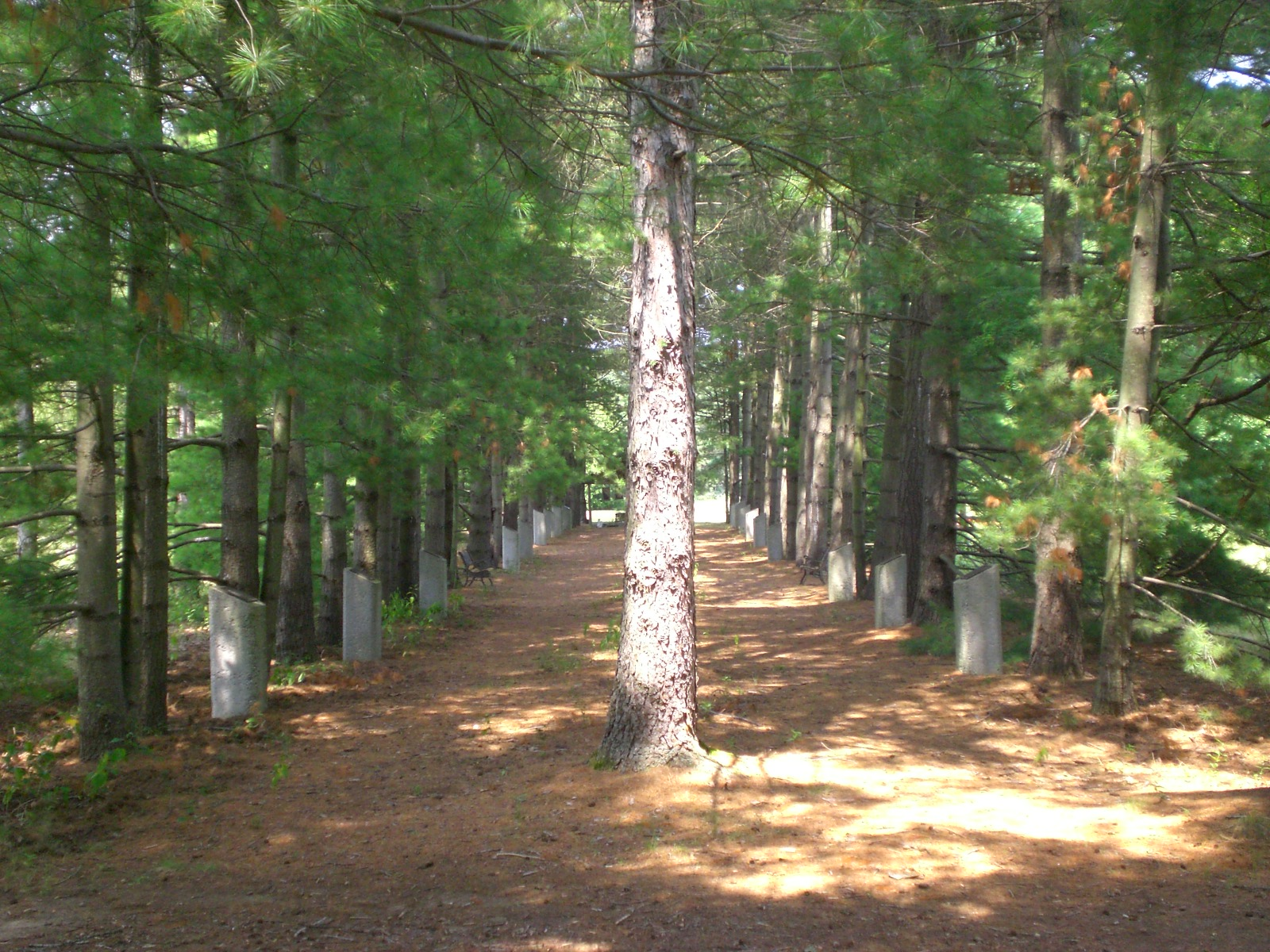
Rosary Lane

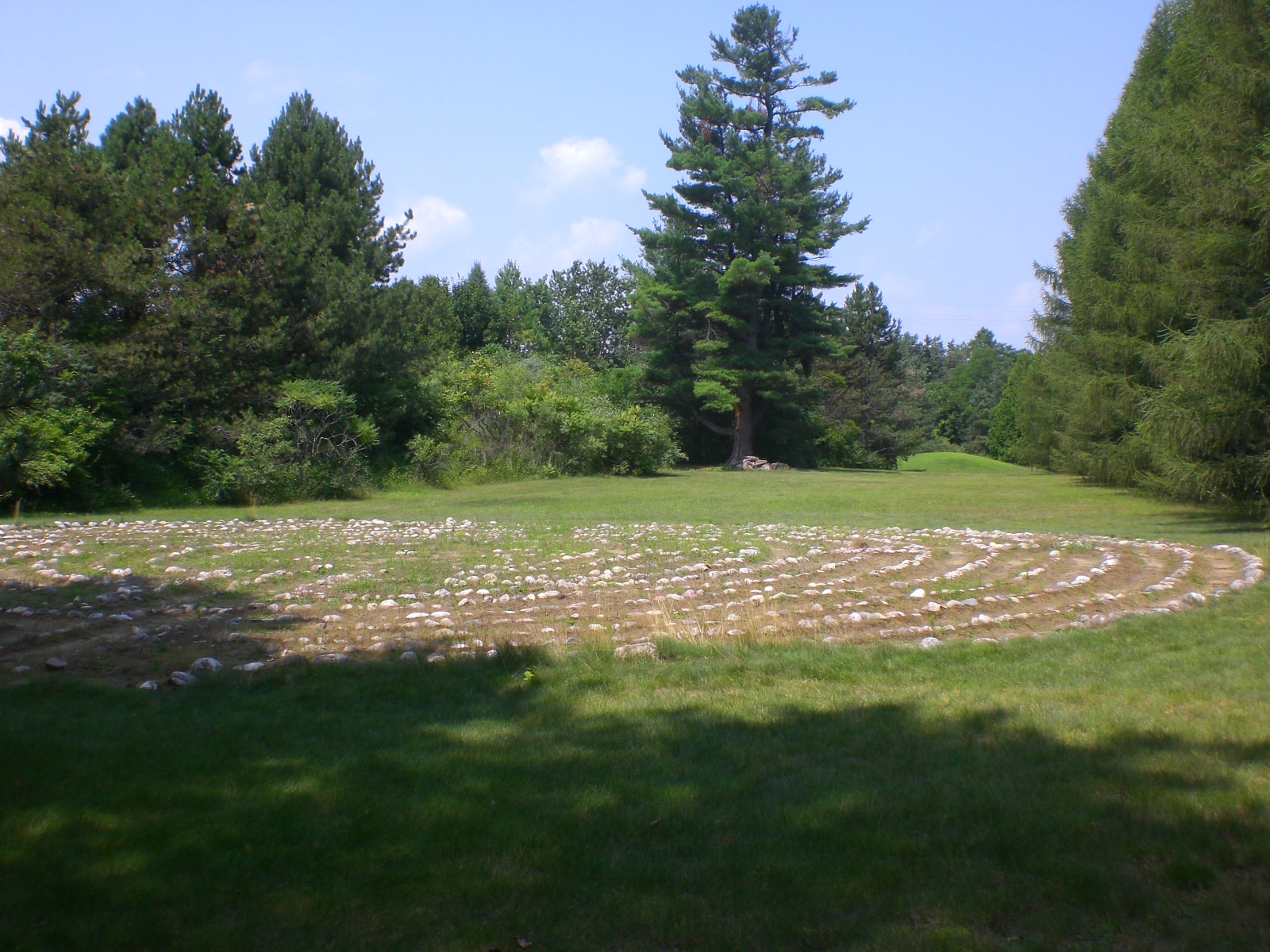
Labyrinth

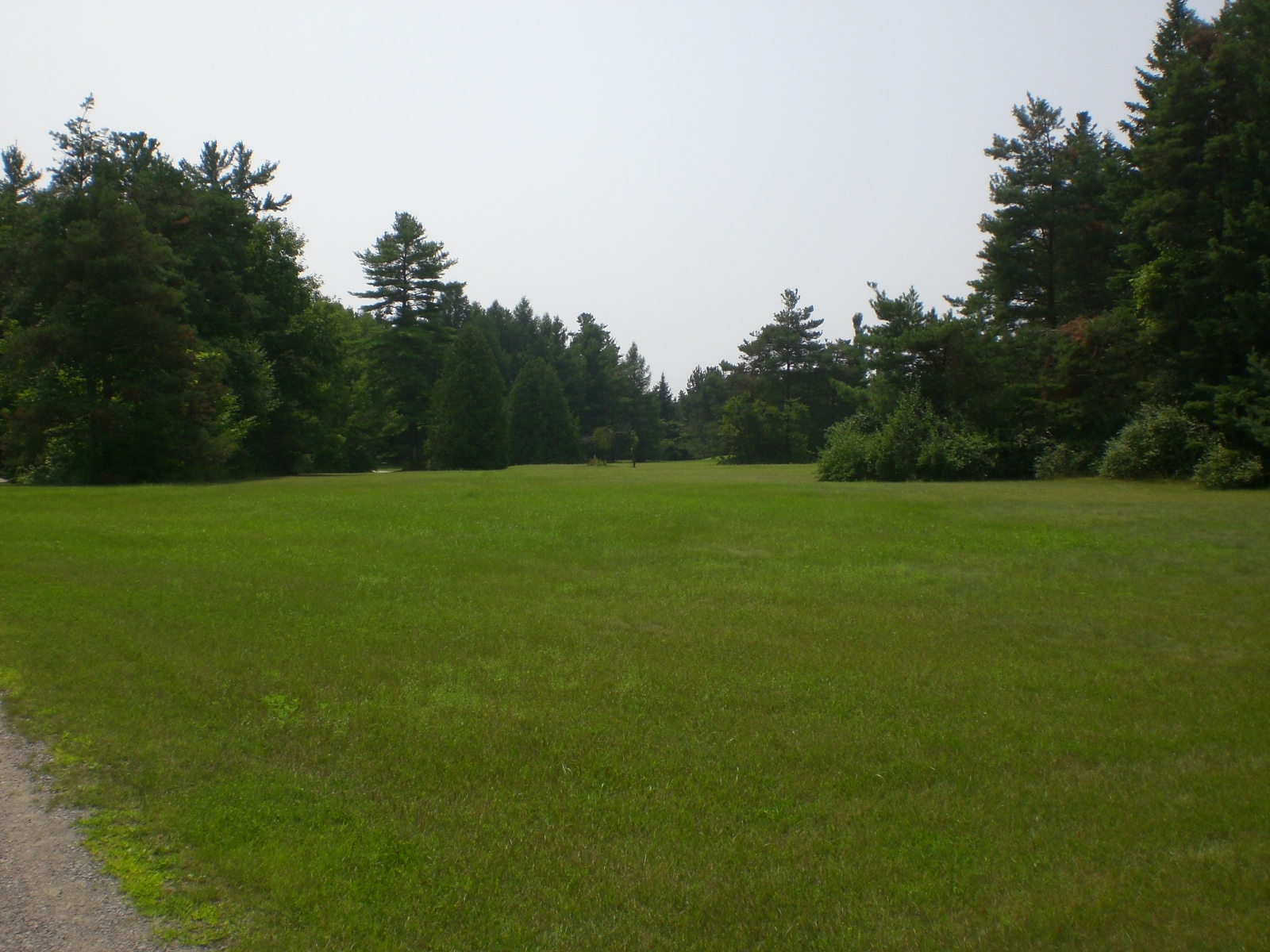
Fields

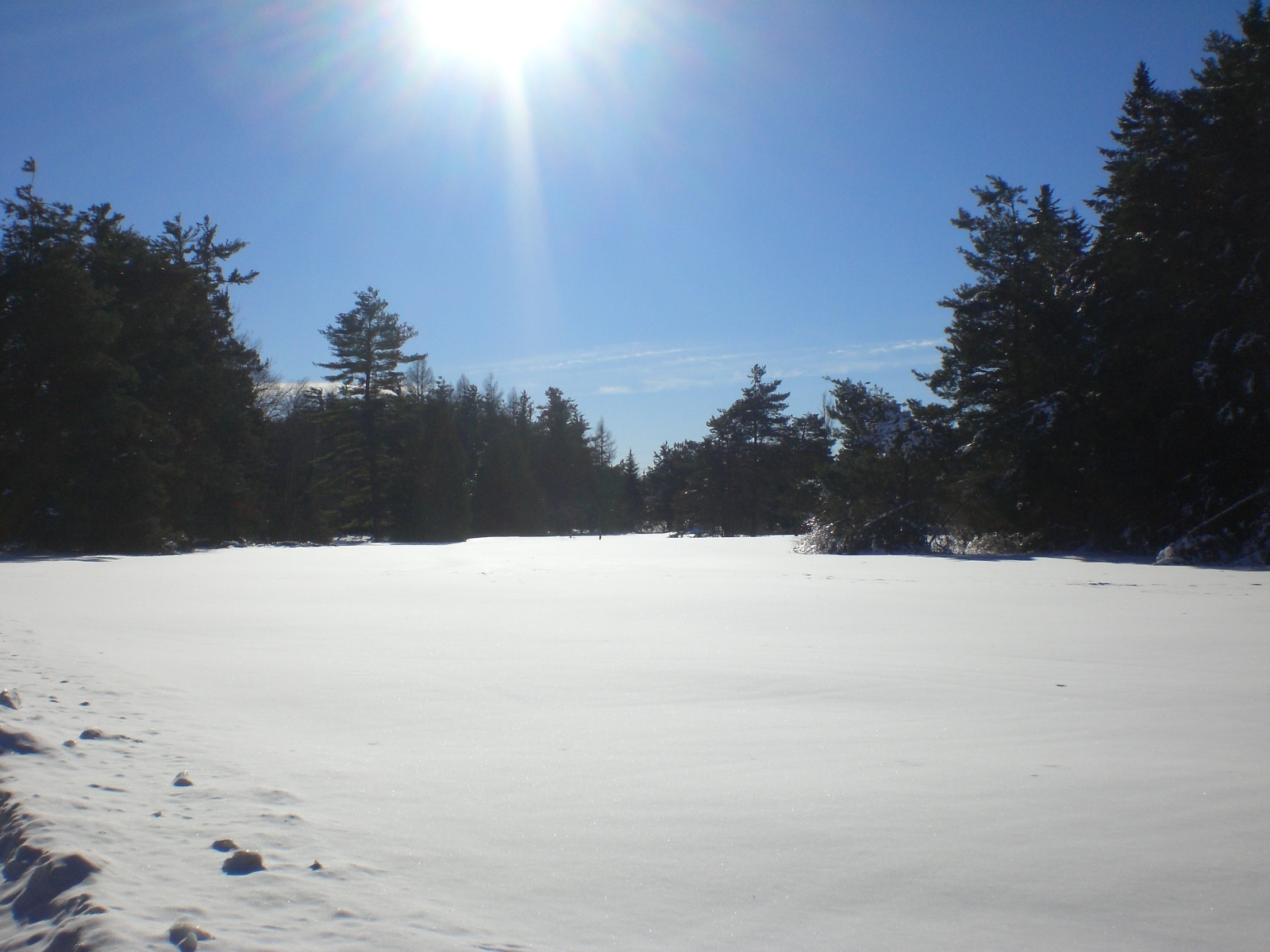
Fields in winter

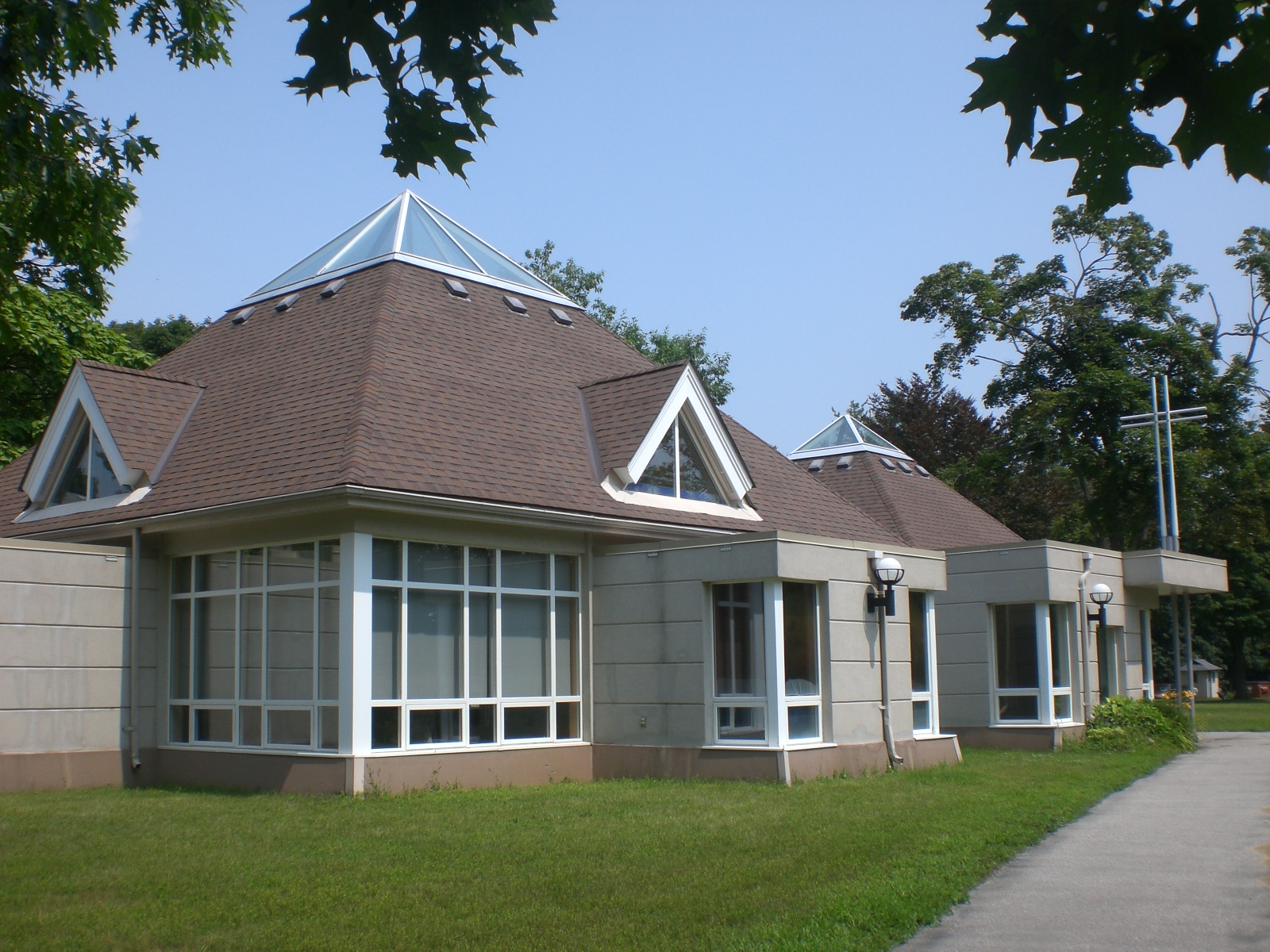
Chapel exterior

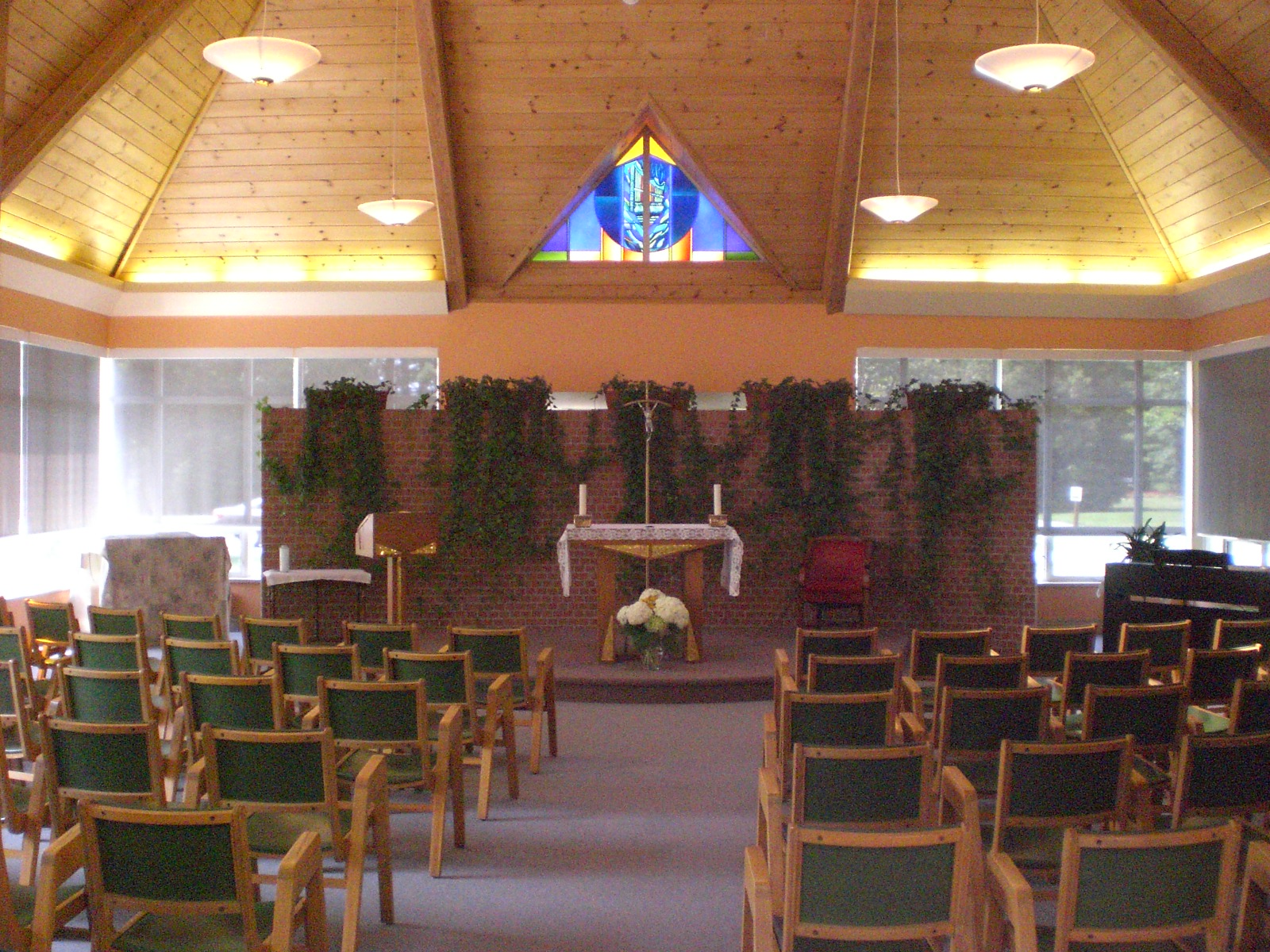
Chapel interior

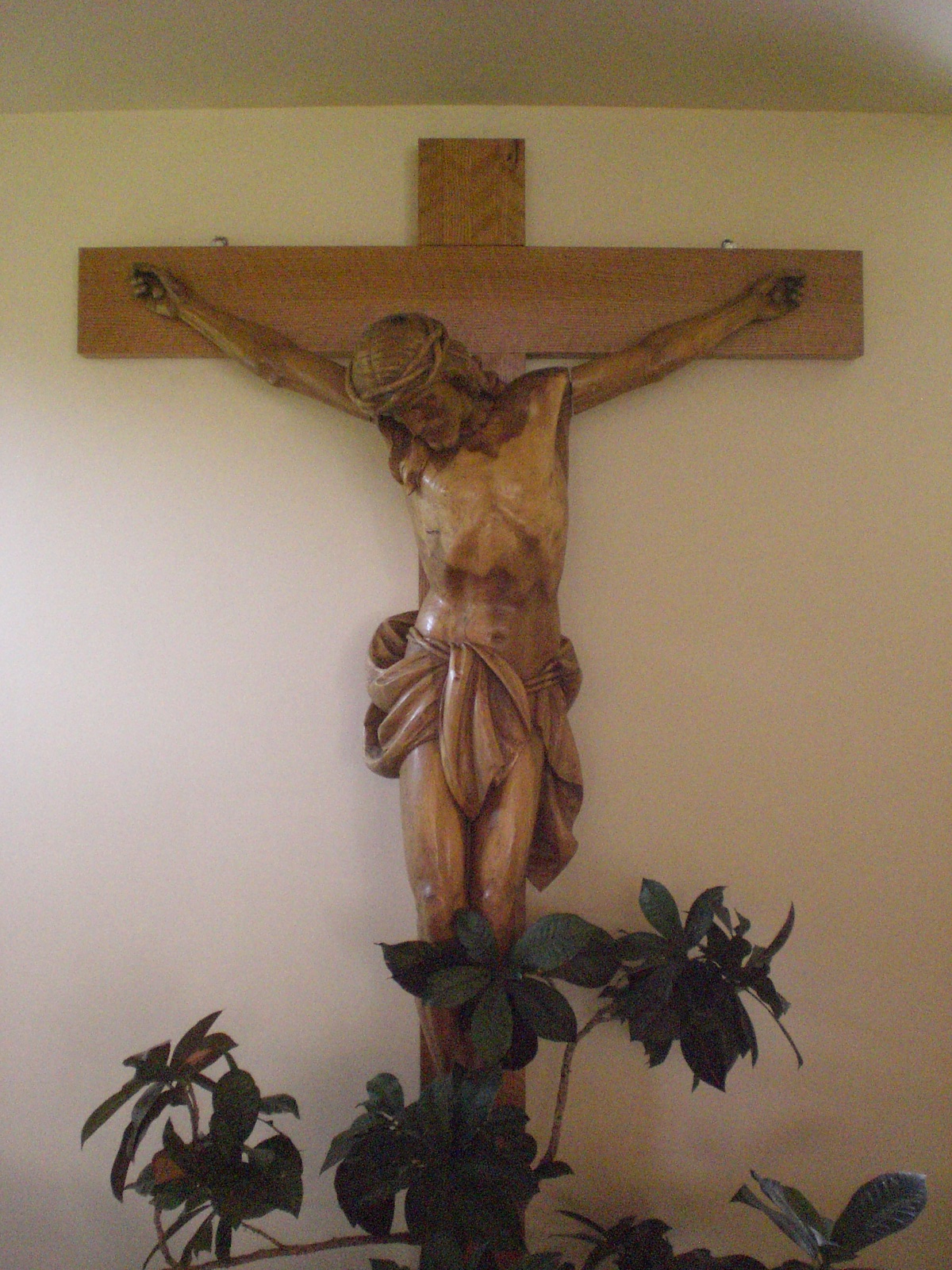
Crucifix in chapel

== See also ==
- List of Jesuit sites
- Ignatian spirituality
