= Manresa Spirituality Centre =

Coordinates: 46.794631°N 71.246089°W

- French: Centre de Spiritualité Manrèse
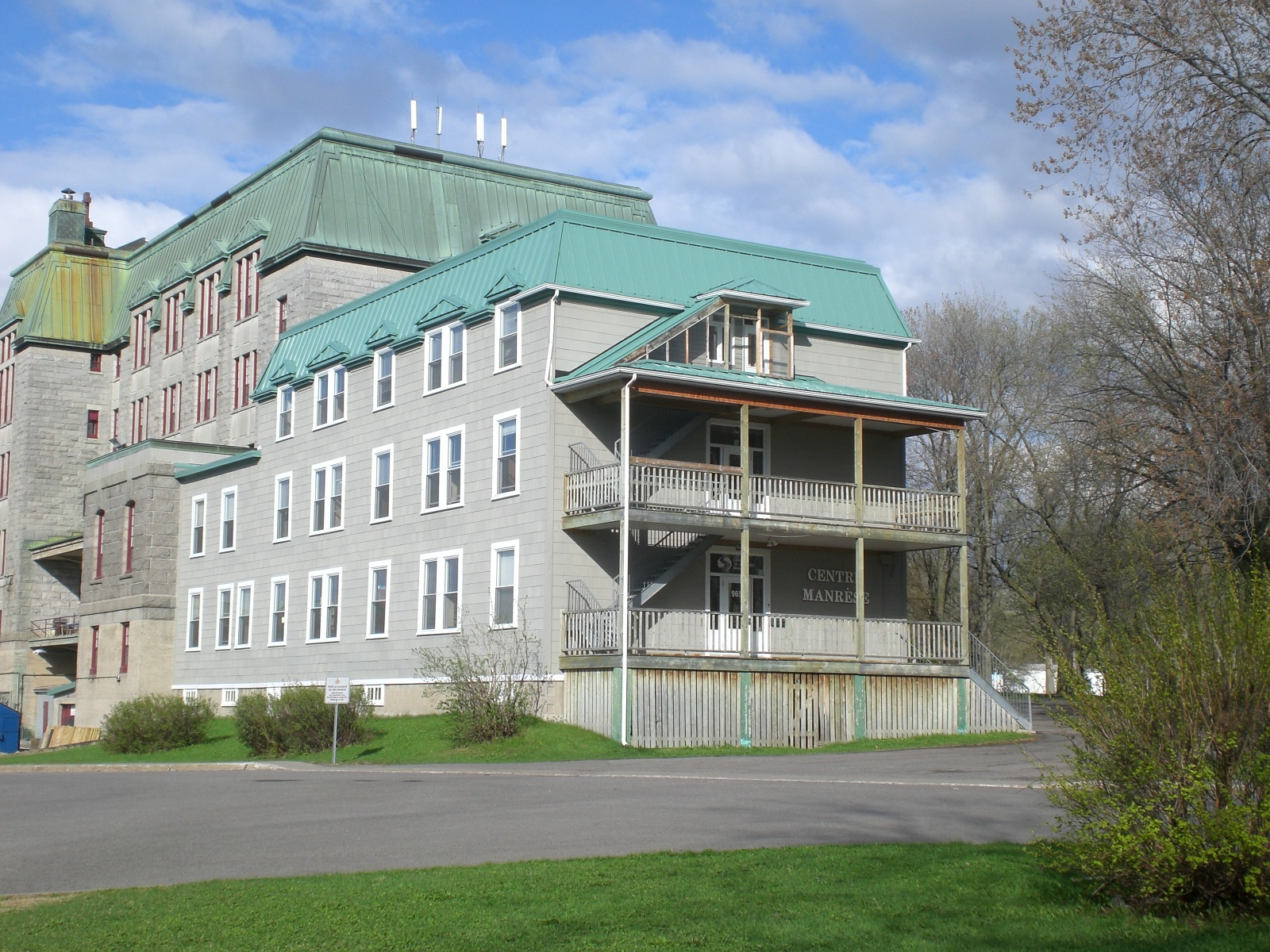
- Front of the centre. St. Charles Garnier College is in the background.

- Location in Quebec City
- Location: 965, avenue Louis-Fréchette; Quebec City, Quebec; G1S 4V1
- Country: Canada
- Denomination: Roman Catholic
- Website: CentreManrese.org

History
- Status: Active
- Founded: 1976

Architecture
- Functional status: Retreat Centre

Administration
- Province: Quebec
- Archdiocese: Quebec
- Deanery: Laurentides/Québec-Centre
- Parish: St Charles Garnier

Manresa Spirituality Centre (French: Centre de Spiritualité Manrèse) or Villa Manresa is a centre for Ignatian spirituality in the Sainte-Foy area of Quebec City. It was founded in 1891 by the Society of Jesus originally on Chemin Sainte-Foy. In 1921, it moved close to Parc des Braves. It is now situated on Louis Fréchette next to St. Charles Garnier College (French: Collège Saint-Charles-Garnier)

== History ==
=== Chemin Sainte-Foy ===
The original Jesuit college in Quebec (which the Jesuit Chapel was originally part of) was seized by British forces in 1776. In 1891, a Jesuit priest, Fr. Edward Désy bought Teviot House on Chemin Sainte-Foy and turned it into Villa Manresa. It was to provide local individual and group retreats in Ignatian spirituality.

With the influx of people in what was previously a rural area, a new chapel was built next to Villa Manresa between 1893 and 1895. It was called Our Lady of the Way (Notre-Dame-du-Chemin). With the increased urbanization of the area, the chapel became a parish church in 1909. In 1911, an annex was created connecting Villa Manresa and the church together, so that the villa could also be used as a presbytery.

=== Parc des Braves ===
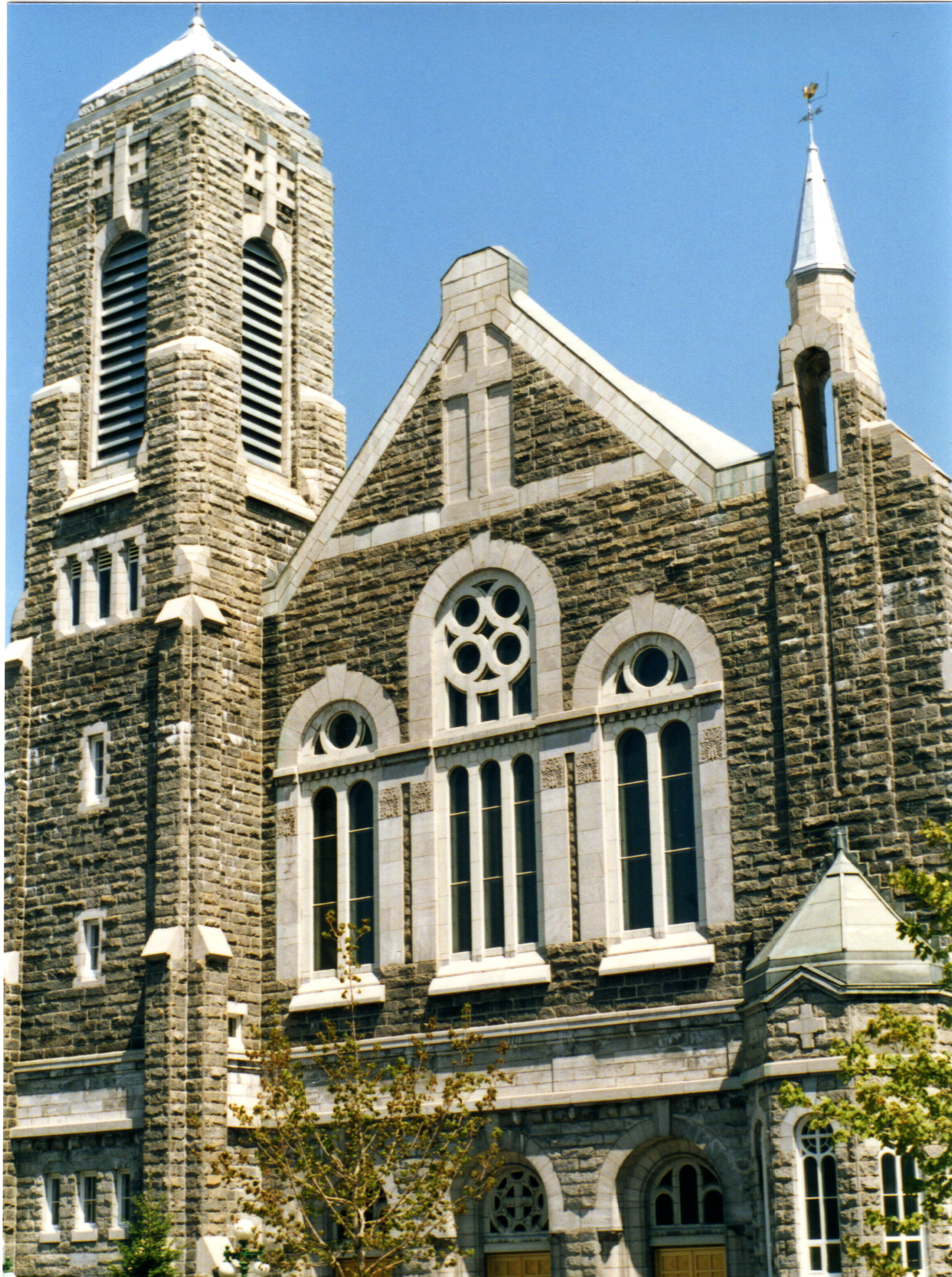
The Church of Our Lady of the Way on Avenue des Érables, demolished in 1999

In 1921, the Jesuits left the presbytery and then the church. Both were given to the Archdiocese of Quebec. They moved Villa Manresa to a site neighbouring Parc des Braves. In 1930, construction work on a new, larger, Church of Our Lady of the Way on Avenue des Érables started, so previous church and villa/presbytery were sold to the Sisters of the Holy Family of Bordeaux in 1936. The old Teviot House was demolished and a hospital was built in its place. It was called St. Anne's Hospital. In 1980 it became Courchesne Hospital. In 1986, the first Our Lady of the Way Church was also demolished.

While this happened the Villa Manresa near Parc des Braves continued to function until 1977.

The street names in the Sainte-Foy area refer to previous locations of Villa Manresa. There is an Avenue de Manrèse behind Courchesne Hospital. Edward Désy is remembered by Avenue Désy off Chemin Sainte-Foy. There is an Avenue Casot, which refers to Jean-Joseph Casot. The previous site of Villa Manresa near Parc des Braves is indicated by the apartment blocks collectively referred to as Manresa Gardens.

=== Rue Nicolas Pinel ===
In 1976, the Villa Manresa became the Ignatian Spirituality Centre and moved from Parc des Braves to Rue Nicolas Pinel, next to Cégep de Sainte-Foy, to the north of the main campus of Laval University. It also expanded its program for human and spiritual education.

In 1995, the Ignatian Spirituality Centre adopted a new constitution, restructured its programs and was renamed the Manresa Spirituality Centre.

In 1999, the Church of Our Lady of the Way on Avenue des Érables was also demolished.

In 2009, the centre moved from Rue Nicolas Pinel to a former Jesuit residence next to St. Charles Garnier College.

=== St. Charles Garnier College ===
In 1930, the Jesuits reopened the college that is currently next door to Villa Manresa. The college was inaugurated on 30 September 1935 as the Jesuit College of St. Charles Garnier.

On 24 August 1987, the Jesuits handed the college over to a separate governing body and it was renamed St. Charles Garnier College.

In 2009, the Manresa Spirituality Centre moved next door to the college, where it continues to operate.

== Overview ==
The centre is named after the city of Manresa in Spain, where the founder of the Jesuits, Ignatius of Loyola stayed in solitude for a year. He wrote the Spiritual Exercises which are the basis of retreats made at the centre. It teaches people to be prayer guides and spiritual directors. It also offers retreats in daily life, publishes spirituality papers as well as spiritual and human guidance.

== Exterior ==
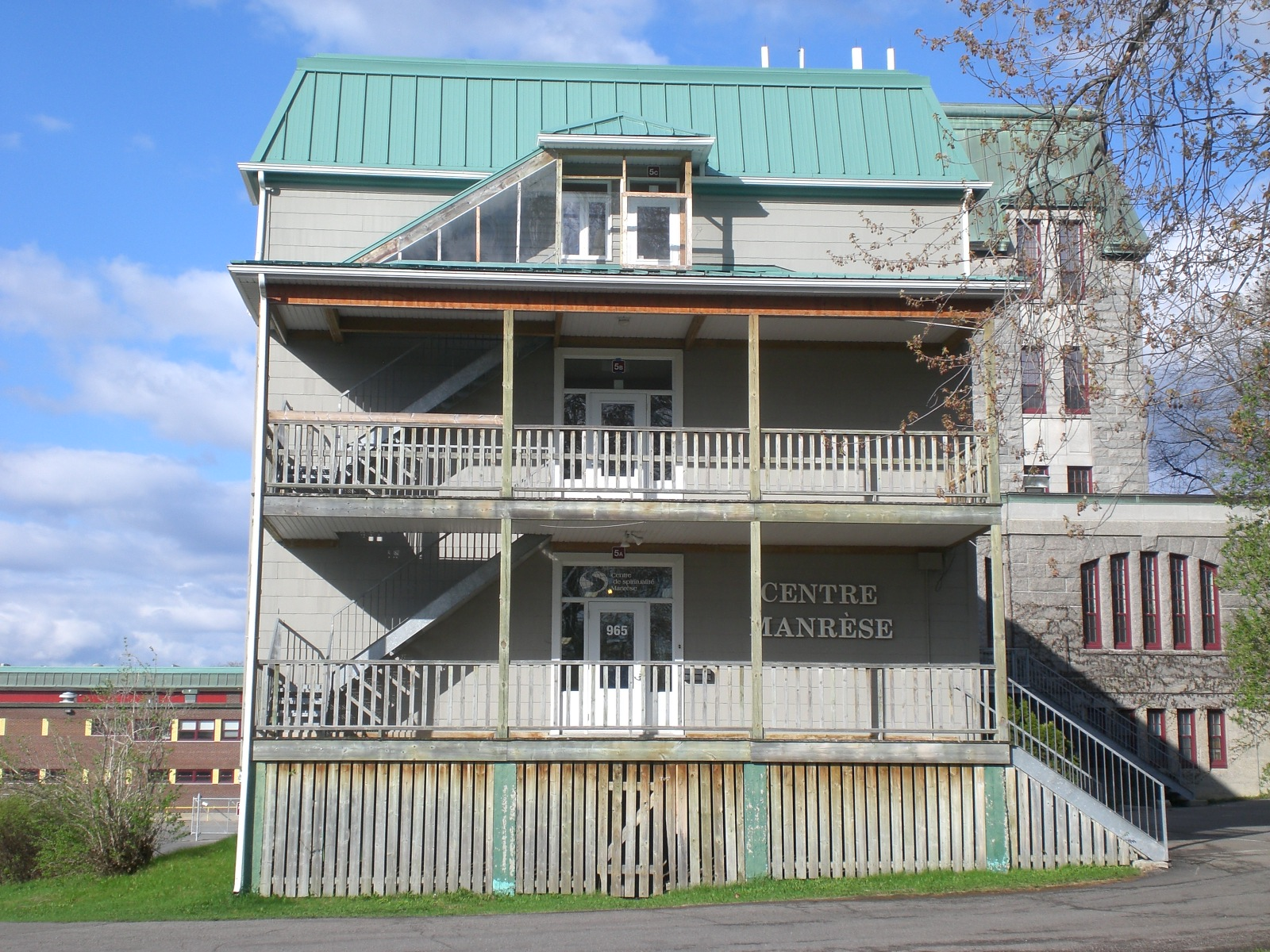
Front entrance

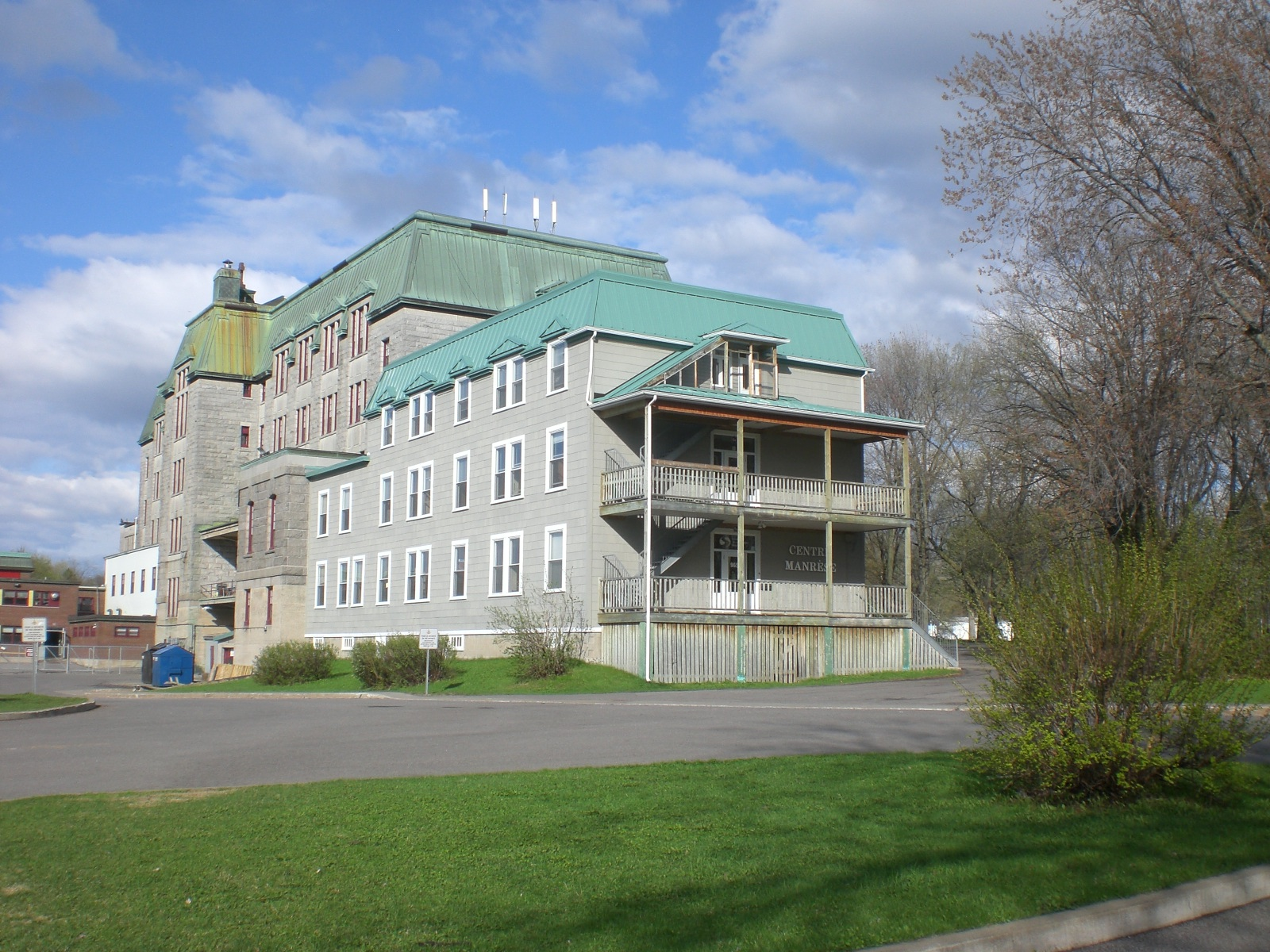
South side of the centre

== See also ==
- Ignatian spirituality
- List of Jesuit sites
