= Lorraine Simms =

Canadian painter

- Born: 1956 (age 69–70); Montréal, Québec, Canada
- Education: Ontario College of Art 1978
- Known for: Painter, graphic artist
- Website: www.lorrainesimms.com

Lorraine Simms RCA (born 1956) is a contemporary Canadian artist from Montréal, Canada.

== Life and work ==
Lorraine Simms earned her Bachelor of Fine Arts at the Ontario College of Art in 1978. Concordia University 1990 In 1990, she completed her Masters of Fine Arts at Concordia University. She began painting professionally in 1991. Simms lives and works in Montréal. She previously taught at Dawson College and Concordia University.

Her work has been exhibited in galleries, cultural institutions, and museums in Canada and the United States, including the Canadian Museum of Nature, the Musée national des beaux-arts du Québec, the Beaverbrook Art Gallery, and the Beaty Biodiversity Museum. Her work was the subject of a Bravo TV documentary in the Shaping Art series. Simms is the recipient of numerous grants from the Conseil des arts et des letters du Québec and the Canada Council for the Arts. Championing the work of other artists, she has curated many solo and group exhibitions that featured their works.

Simms' practice is expressed in painting, painting installations, drawing and assemblages. She works in thematic series that are linked formally and conceptually. Her works aim to strike a balance between the observable and the implied, while exploring the fugitive nature of representation. For the past decade Simms has developed several series that feature animal forms – plush, taxidermy and bones – in paintings, drawings and sculpture. Her most recent works, as described by James Campbell in White Hot Magazine of Contemporary Art, are "interrogatory and invitingly ambiguous.”

== Notable series ==
=== Shadowland (2018–present) ===
Working with the bones and skins of animals considered vulnerable or endangered, Simms developed a large drawing series entitled Shadowland. These drawings were researched in the Mammalogy Department at the American Museum of Natural History in New York during two residencies (2018, 2019). These drawings explore the intricate shadows cast by animal skulls and bones and offer a reflective space to consider the spiritual dimension of animals, our intertwined histories and future evolution. James Campbell in White Hot Magazine of Contemporary Art wrote: “In these drawings, harvested shadows make the dead animals that cast them live again, with otherworldly feral grace. This is no exercise in enervating nostalgia, but a demonstration of daunting draughtsmanship”.

Works from this series have been featured in several exhibitions, including the Canadian Museum of Nature (2021), the Illingworth Kerr Gallery in Calgary (2022), the Beaty Biodiversity Museum (2019), McBride Contemporary in Montreal (2019) and Super Dutchess in New York, New York (2019).

=== Plush (2010–2018) ===
From 2010 to 2018 Simms worked with plush, creating three distinct painting series and a number of sculptures or "assemblages". These works consider the Disneyfication of reality portrayed by these ephemeral objects of our affections. In the exhibition catalogue for Haunted By You, René Viau wrote: "Though related to kitsch and referring to a world of consumerism and big-box stores, these canvases are clearly grounded in an historical pictorial tradition. This work is distinguished as much by skillful representation, for example, the inventive virtuoso renderings of the texture of fake fur, as by the emphasis on the overall surface and paint handling."

=== Spectral and The Interview (2010) ===
In 2010, Simms completed a large number of small paintings on paper that explore two ambiguously related subjects: details of Michael Jackson’s face from different periods of his life and close-ups of plush toys. These works were first presented in a solo exhibition, Spectral at the Anna Leonowens Gallery. In conjunction with this exhibition Simms published The Interview, an illustrated book featuring her fictional interview with Michael Jackson after his funeral. The book also includes manipulated digital images and a selection of paintings from Spectral.

=== Fugitive (2006–2007) ===
Based on mugshots of female offenders "wanted mostly for fraud", Simms created a series of large portraits entitled Fugitive. Other than this clue, no further information is offered. In an exhibition essay about these works, Martha Langford wrote that Simms "wants them for fraud, for the perpetration of pictorial fictions in her studio. Innumerable degrees of separation are between us the spectators, and these shadowy figures. Their masks find refuge in a painter's studio, a place where photographic claims of truth and authenticity have no place. Simms creates zones of ambiguity and in-between."
