= Wayne Maddison =

Canadian evolutionary biologist (born 1958)

Wayne Paul Maddison
- Born: 1958 (age 67–68); London, Ontario, Canada
- Education: University of Toronto; Harvard University
- Awards: NSERC Postdoctoral Fellowship (1988–1990), David and Lucile Packard Fellowship for Science and Engineering (1993–1998), Fellow of the Royal Society of Canada (2011)
- Scientific career
- Fields: Systematics, phylogenetics, arachnology, ecology
- Institutions: University of Arizona; University of British Columbia
- Thesis: A revision of jumping spider species groups formerly placed in the genus Metaphidippus, with a discussion of salticid phylogeny (Araneae) (1988)
- Doctoral advisor: Herbert W. Levi

Wayne Paul Maddison FRSC (born 1958) is a Canadian evolutionary biologist, arachnologist, and biological illustrator. He is Canada Research Chair in Biodiversity and a professor at the departments of zoology and botany at the University of British Columbia, and the Director of the Spencer Entomological Collection at the Beaty Biodiversity Museum.

== Education and career ==
Maddison was born in London, Ontario and his interests in studying spiders started while he was a teenager exploring Lake Ontario. Maddison studied zoology at the University of Toronto, where he obtained his BSc in 1980. He went on to study at Harvard University in the Department of Organismic and Evolutionary Biology, where he obtained his PhD in 1988 under the supervision of Herbert W. Levi. He was a NSERC postdoctoral fellow at the University of California, Berkeley from 1988 to 1990, where he worked with Montgomery Slatkin. Maddison became an assistant professor and later associate professor at the University of Arizona in 1990 and stayed there until 2003, during which he was David and Lucile Packard Fellow for Science and Engineering between 1993 and 1998. Maddison moved back to Canada in 2003 and joined the University of British Columbia (UBC), where he was a professor in zoology and botany. In the same year, he also became the director of the Spencer Entomological Collection at the Beaty Biodiversity Museum of UBC.

== Research ==
Maddison's research concerns the phylogeny, biodiversity, and evolution of jumping spiders (Salticidae), of which he has discovered new species and genera. His research has led him to discover new species of jumping spiders in Sarawak and Papua New Guinea.

Maddison has also done research in phylogenetic theory, developing and perfecting various methods used in comparative biology, such as character state inference in internal nodes through maximum parsimony, squared-change parsimony, or character correlation through the concentrated changes test or pairwise comparisons. In collaboration with his brother David R. Maddison, he worked on the Mesquite open-source phylogeny software, the MacClade program, and the Tree of Life Web Project.

== Selected publications ==
- Maddison, Wayne P.; Donoghue, Michael J.; Maddison, David R. (March 1984). "Outgroup Analysis and Parsimony". Systematic Zoology. 33 (1): 83–103. doi:10.2307/2413134. JSTOR 2413134.
- Maddison, Wayne P. (1997). "Gene Trees in Species Trees". Systematic Biology. 46 (3): 523–536. doi:10.1093/sysbio/46.3.523.
- Knowles, LL; Maddison, WP (December 2002). "Statistical phylogeography". Molecular Ecology. 11 (12): 2623–2635. Bibcode:2002MolEc..11.2623K. doi:10.1046/j.1365-294X.2002.01410.x. PMID 12453245.
