= Kin Fables =

Film project created by Ben McKinnon and Seb McKinnon

Kin Fables is a film project created by brothers Ben and Seb McKinnon, and produced by their company Five Knights Productions. In addition to the three short films, Kin, Salvage, and Requiem, Kin Fables includes Seb McKinnon's music work, with a short film Kin Fables: The Stolen Child, created to accompany the music created under the name CLANN.

== Background ==
Kin Fables was created by Ben McKinnon and Seb McKinnon after they took a trip backpacking through Scotland, finding the country rich with medieval history and legends and after Seb McKinnon started composing music using Logic Pro, which lead to him and Ben McKinnon creating storyboards for the first film. Originally intended to consist of nine short films, it was later condensed to three. The first short film, Kin, was released in 2013, with the following films, Salvage and Requiem, releasing in 2015 after a successful Kickstarter campaign to fund the projects.

Kin was awarded Best Cinematography in the Quebec Short Film Category at the Fantasia International Film Festival in Montreal and the Cyprus International Film Festival.

A graphic novel is being produced as a companion piece to the film projects, which is intended to follow the story after one of the short films. A feature-length film is also being developed by Seb McKinnon and his brother Liam McKinnon based on the Kin Fables universe.

== Plot ==
=== Kin ===
A lone knight blows a horn, and drops it on a muddied river bank. A boy runs out of his house and into an old forest, while the knight also searches through the forest. After arriving at a field, he is approached by spirits who hand him a primitive drum and the knight finds a saddled, white horse in the forest. After journeying further, the boy finds a girl standing by a river, who follows him and drops her necklace into the river. After coming to the top of a mountain with the girl following him, the boy bangs the drum, as the spirits from earlier perform a ritual in the field. The knight races through the trees on a horse as a giant raven comes down from the clouds at the mountain top, and envelops the boy. The knight arrives at the mountain top to find only the girl standing where the boy stood, looking outward in the direction the raven approached from.

=== Salvage ===
A plane flies over the ocean and through dense, grey clouds. The pilot fights for control of the plane, eventually losing control and plunging down into the ocean. The pilot wakes up on a rocky shore, and searches along it, looking out to sea. The pilot hears a girls laughter, then spots a woman in a white dress on the edge of the shore. The pilot heads towards the woman, and as he waves towards her, pain strikes his side, and his hand comes away from his side red with blood. The pilot keeps following the woman, who occasionally looks back towards him, away from the shore, and he leaves a trail of blood as he does so. The woman stands atop a cliff face and as the pilot approaches her, mist envelops her and she disappears. The pilot sees a small lighthouse and heads towards it, but collapses before reaching it.

A group of black clad men with fishing spears surround the pilot, and they perform a ritual upon him, mixing herbs and chanting, as he lies upon the rocky cliff. After the ritual, the woman in a white dress approaches the pilot, and places her necklace on the pilots neck. The black clad men lead the pilot out to sea on a small dingy, rowing it as the pilot gains consciousness. The black clad men stop rowing, and as the clouds move, the full moon shines down upon the dingy. The black clad man at the front turns to the pilot and looks at him, before every black clad man jumps into the water, and they sink into the water underneath the dingy.

=== Requiem ===
A young man wakes up in his bed, has a shower, and gets on his motorbike and leaves his house. He rides through the city and arrives at his destination, stops his bike and gets off. After travelling up to his office, he performs his work for the day, then leaves at night. He talks to a young woman in a club whilst drinking. The next morning, he wakes up in his bed, showers, rides his motorbike to work, and leaves once it's late. He meets with the same woman from the night before, and wakes up in his bed next to her. This cycle repeats itself again and again.

As he approaches the club one night, an old man watches the young man on the street. After dancing with the young woman, the young man goes to the bar for a drink. After leaving the bar, the young man notices odd spirit like creatures in the crowd at the club, and he leaves. The young man stumbles down the street, memories of the spirits in his mind, and comes to rest in an alleyway. He notices the old man walking towards him. The old man approaches and pulls out a necklace from his jacket, giving it to the young man, before walking away into the darkness of the alley.

The young man leaves on his motorbike, while the old man trudges down an alleyway, collapsing against a wall. As the old man looks up at the crescent moon, a dark, birdlike figure flies across the sky. The young man drives away, out of the city and far into the countryside, eventually riding into a forest. After taking off his gloves and helmet, the young man ventures further into the forest and he comes across a white horse with a saddle. The young man finds a large house standing alone amongst the trees. After looking around, the young man reaches into one of the pools at the front of the house, and pulls out a small, yellow toy plane. As he looks up from the plane, the young man sees a woman in a white dress. The woman approaches the young man, and they embrace.

Spirits gather by a running river, and dip several seeds into the water.
