= Ross H. Paul =

Ross Henderson Paul, CM is a university administrator who was the fifth president and vice-chancellor of the University of Windsor. He completed his term of office as president on June 30, 2008. In 2024, he was appointed Chancellor of the Acsenda School of Management in Vancouver.

A bilingual native of Montreal, Paul came to the University of Windsor as president early in 1998 immediately after serving almost seven years as president of Laurentian University in Sudbury, Ontario.

Paul holds a B.A. in mathematics and economics from Bishops University (1964), an M.A. in educational administration from McGill University (1968). He also graduated from the University of London (postgraduate certificate in education, 1965 and Ph.D., 1973).

He started his career as a teacher at Montreal’s Lower Canada College (1965–67, 1968–69). After two years at Bishop’s University, where he was alumni secretary and lecturer in the Graduate School of Education (1969–71), and following completion of his doctorate in London, he spent seven years at Dawson College in Montreal, where he held the positions of dean of arts and academic dean. Beginning in 1980, Paul spent eleven years at Alberta’s Athabasca University, ten as vice-president academic and one as acting president before assuming the presidency of Laurentian University in 1991.

Paul’s research interests include academic leadership; open, distance and digital education; and the management of higher education. He is the author of the 1990 book, Open Learning and Open Management: Leadership and Integrity in Distance Education and the 2011 book, Leadership Under Fire: The Challenging Role of the Canadian University President. (2nd edition, 2015) and section editor and contributor to the Handbook of Open, Distance and Digital Education (2023).

He is a past chair of the Council of Ontario Universities and past member of the Board of Directors of AUCC (now Universities Canada). He is a past chair of the board of World University Service of Canada (WUSC) and was founding chair of both the Optical Research Advanced Network of Ontario (ORANO) and CREAD, the distance education network for all of the Americas. He also served a term as vice-president, North America, for the International Council of Distance Education (ICDE).

As an adjunct professor at the University of British Columbia since 2008, he has run summer programs for Chinese university administrators and is a consultant on many aspects of higher education leadership and governance. He is currently a member of the Governing Council of Vancouver's Acsenda School of Management. Since 2017, he has volunteered on a regular basis as presiding official for Canadian citizenship ceremonies. He also served a term on the Telus Community Board of Vancouver.

Paul was a founding member of the Edmonton Summerfest Board, which created the Edmonton International Fringe Festival. He was a member of the Ontario Minister’s Advisory Committee on Arts and Culture and a national governor of the Shaw Festival. He is past chair of the board of the Arts Club Theatre and of the Canadian Arts Summit. He plays piano and guitar and has been author of and performer in many musical revues and Fringe Theatre productions and was co-creator of The Festival Folkmass.

For his community activities, he was awarded the 125th Anniversary of the Confederation of Canada Medal in 1992, the Queen Elizabeth II Golden Jubilee Medal in 2002 and the Queen Elizabeth Diamond Jubilee Medal in 2012. He received the Bishops University Award of Merit in 2000 for contributions to higher education and Dawson College awarded him an Honorary Diploma and named its highest academic award, the Ross Paul Award, in 1980. In 2010, he was appointed a Member of the Order of Canada.

Paul is married to Dr. Jane Brindley, a psychologist, and has two sons: David (a college administrator) and Jonathan (a teacher), and three grand children Naomi, Guire, Grace.
