= DisAbled Women's Network Canada =

Canadian feminist disability rights organization

- Abbreviation: DAWN
- Formation: June 20–23, 1985
- Type: Women's organization
- Legal status: Active
- Purpose: Advocate and public voice, educator and network
- Headquarters: Montréal, Québec
- Region served: Canada
- Official language: English; French
- Website: DAWN Canada

DAWN Canada/Réseau d'action des femmes handicapées du Canada is a Canadian national feminist network controlled by and composed of people who self-identify as women with disabilities. The network also supports local and provincial chapters. DAWN is a member organization of the National Action Committee on the Status of Women, Canada's largest feminist organization.

== History ==
The organization began on June 20–23, 1985, at a meeting of seventeen women from across Canada who came together to discuss issues of interest to women with various disabilities, including Maria Barile. The main purpose of this initial meeting was to plan a larger national gathering of disabled women who would then develop the organization's strategies and goals. Early groups formed in Prince Edward Island, Toronto, Halifax, British Columbia, and Montreal and in Winnipeg, that city's existing group for women with disabilities, the Consulting Committee on the Status of Women with Disabilities also joined the network.

== Mission ==
DAWN Canada's mission is "to end the poverty, isolation, discrimination and violence experienced by women with disabilities, and to fight for women with disabilities to have freedom of choice in all aspects of their lives."
