= Seb McKinnon =

Canadian illustrator and filmmaker

- Born: Montreal, Quebec, Canada
- Education: Dawson College
- Occupation: Artist
- Website: www.sebmckinnon.com

Seb McKinnon is a Canadian freelance illustrator. He has illustrated many cards for the collectible card game Magic: The Gathering.

== Early life, education, and family ==
Seb McKinnon was born in Montreal, Quebec, growing up in a creative family with four younger brothers. He attended Dawson College, where he received a degree in illustration.

== Career ==
For some time after college, McKinnon worked for the video game company Ubisoft as a game designer. At Ubisoft, he was a part of the concept team for the tactical shooter Rainbow Six Siege.

In 2012, McKinnon received his first commission from Wizards of the Coast to illustrate a card for the Magic 2013 core set of Magic: The Gathering. He has since provided art for more than 100 Magic: The Gathering cards, having gained a reputation within the Magic community for his wistful, dreamlike compositions.

Aside from illustration work, McKinnon started a film production company, Five Knights Productions, with his brother, Ben. In 2013, they released Kin, a short film which went on to win the Best Cinematography awards at both the Montreal Fantasia Film Festival and the Cyprus International Film Festival. In 2015, the two McKinnon brothers completed Salvage and Requiem, two more short films set in the same Kin Fables universe. After Ben died in 2016, Seb and his brother Liam started work on Kin Fables: The Stolen Child, a Kin Fables feature film in honor of his brother. Seb has run two successful Kickstarter projects to fund The Stolen Child, offering playmats featuring his Magic: The Gathering art as compensation.

In addition to digital illustration and filmmaking, Seb McKinnon produces music under the name CLANN. Much of the music in the Kin Fables films was made by McKinnon using the Logic Pro software.
