= Ahmed Al-Khabaz =

White hat hacker and entrepreneur (b. 1992)

Hamed Al-Khabaz
- Born: Ahmed Al-Khabaz; April 22, 1992 (age 34); Montreal, Quebec
- Occupations: Entrepreneur, Computer tech

Ahmed Al-Khabaz (born 22 April 1994), known as Hamed, is a Canadian computer programmer and entrepreneur who was involved in a controversial media story in his country back in 2014. The issue was his expulsion from Dawson College for exposing a security flaw in the school's computer system. He became a technology entrepreneur after the incident.

== Early life ==
Al-Khabaz was born to a Shia Muslim family who fled Iraq in the early 1990s. His father was educated as a doctor at Indiana State University, but had been imprisoned due to his religious beliefs when he came back to Iraq. Al-Khabaz' interest in computers stemmed from playing games at an early age. He was thrilled about the idea of breaking stuff and making new discoveries. He hacked into computer games like the real-time strategy Warcraft game and the first-person shooter video game, Counter-Strike.

At age 16, he would code in C++ and inject dynamic-link libraries into video games, which he would release to public chat forums. After high school, he applied for the computer science program at Dawson College but was not accepted. He was, however, admitted to the school's social studies program and transferred to computer science later.

== Controversy ==
When he was 20 years old, Al-Khabaz was expelled from Dawson College for what the school called as "unauthorized access" offense. As a member of the school's software development club, he was creating a mobile application that would allow students easier access to their personal information. In the course of the application development, he discovered that the college's online administration system, which uses Omnivox software, was vulnerable to hacking due to what Al-Khabaz cited as "sloppy coding". The software, a system widely used by Quebec's general and vocational colleges, was developed by a company called Skytech Communications.

The vulnerability exposed the personal information of over 250,000 students, including social insurance number, credit card numbers, home address, phone number, class schedule - basically all the information the college has on a student. It was reported to the college's director of information services and technology. Al-Khabaz was initially congratulated for his work with a promise from the school that the system would be fixed. When he did not hear from administrators after a few days, Al-Khabaz checked if the problem was addressed using Acunetix, which is a program used to analyze the security of web applications. This was how he was accused of cyber attack for being spotted in the Skytech system without prior notification from the system administrator. According to Dawson College, he was expelled for violating the school's code of professional conduct on account of his repeated and unauthorized attempts to access the college information system.

=== Hearing ===
The story attracted national attention in Canada after it was published by the National Post. Al-Khabaz maintained that he did not receive a fair hearing when a panel of 15 faculty members voted in favor of expulsion, 14-1 although he was interviewed by the dean of Dawson College and his computer science program coordinator. The expulsion received criticism from some quarters such as the Dawson Student Union, which later worked for Al-Khabaz' reinstatement. An online petition urging the school to revoke its decision gathered 12,000 signatures. The school stood by its decision and cited how Al-Khabaz was repeatedly warned to cease and desist but failed to do so.

== Technology entrepreneur ==
After he was expelled, Al-Khabaz received numerous job offers from technology and software companies. These included a public offer from Edouard Taza of Skytech Communications who said that the student is “extremely bright”, promising a full scholarship to a private CEGEP and a part-time job at his company. Al-Khabaz, however, opted to launch Outpost Travel, a startup that aggregated peer-to-peer travel accommodations with business partner Ovi Mija, a fellow Dawson College student. His company was awarded $200,000 in venture capital, and counted Dave McClure as one of the investors.

In 2016, Al-Khabaz relocated to Boulder, Colorado where he got accepted to the Travelport Labs Accelerator program. Al-Khabaz has since co-founded a travel tech company, by the name of Stay22, a free accommodations widget for event websites that allow users to view price-coded map of all accommodations in the area where an event is taking place. Stay22 raised over $750,000 from various investors including Travelport, FounderFuel, Real Venture, and 7 Gate Venture. In 2024, Stay22 surpassed $500,000,000 in gross merchandise volume and was ranked 69th on the Deloitte Technology Fast 500 North America.
