= Jessica Lanyadoo =

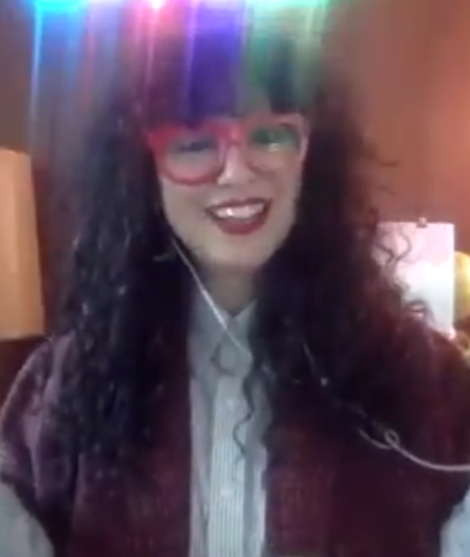
- In a 2019 interview
- Born: Montreal, Canada
- Occupations: Astrologer, psychic, podcaster

Jessica Lanyadoo is an astrologer, psychic medium, and podcaster. She is best known for her podcast Ghost of a Podcast.

== Life and career ==
Lanyadoo was born and raised in Montreal, Canada. She is Jewish; her mother is a Sephardi Jew who settled in Canada as a refugee from Iraq, and her father is an Ashkenazi Jew whose parents were Polish Holocaust survivors. She first developed her interest in astrology at age 12. She attended Dawson College's New School, and while there took courses on astrology and mediums.

She moved to San Francisco in 1994 to pursue a career as an astrologer and began working with clients in 1995. Her approach to astrology centers the relationship to the self and emphasizes accountability. Rosemary Donahue of Allure wrote of Lanyadoo's view: "To her, astrology is a tool to get to know ourselves better, which improves relationships in its own way." Lanyadoo described being a psychic medium as "having intuitive ability."

Lanyadoo was the astrologer for the San Francisco Bay Guardian from 2003 until 2014, when the paper closed. She has written an astrology column for Chatelaine since 2016. She debuted her podcast Ghost of A Podcast in 2018. Her first book, Astrology for Real Relationships: Understanding You, Me, and How We All Get Along, was released in December 2019 under Ten Speed Press. She dictated the book to journalist and co-author T. Greenway.

Lanyadoo resides in Oakland. She is queer.
