= William John Sutton =

Canadian industrialist

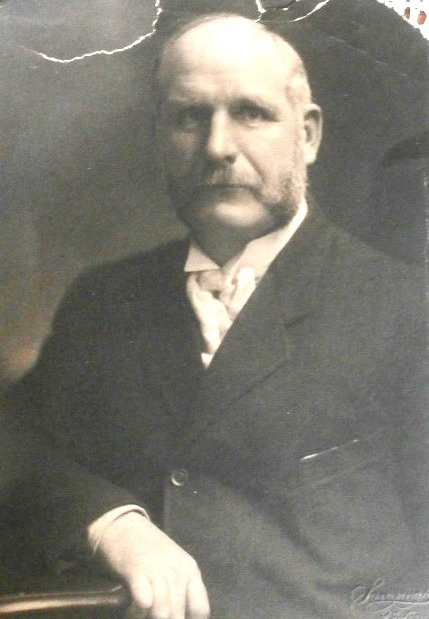
William John Sutton (1859-1914)

William John Sutton (19 January 1859 – 9 May 1914) was a timberman, geologist, mineralogist, assayer, surveyor, lecturer, explorer, pioneer and promoter of Vancouver Island, British Columbia and stood twice in B.C. elections.

== Biography ==
Sutton was born in Kincardine, Canada West, and was the first of six children born to William Sutton (1828-1893) and Sarah Keyworth (1834-1905); his father emigrated from Dent, Cumbria in 1850 and his mother from Tuxford, Nottinghamshire in 1852. At the age of 33 years Sutton married Helen Annie Fox (1852-1932) who was born in Sheffield and ran the family cutlery store in Victoria. They did not have children.

== Education ==
Sutton attended public schools in Kincardine and Walkerton followed by a year at Trinity College School, Port Hope, Ontario (1873-1874). He then went to Sibley College of Mechanical Arts, Cornell (1874-1876)] but dropped out after completing two years to take a short business course at Hamilton Business College before attending the Columbia School of Mines (1876-1877). In 1895 he took a special course in chemistry, mineralogy, petrography and geology, at the Michigan School of Mines, following which he became assistant teacher helping various professors in metallurgy, assaying, biology, zoology, palaeontology, mineralogy, crystallography, petrology, lithology and geology. Alongside his teaching he completed his degree with a 54-page thesis entitled Geology of Penokee-Gogebic Iron Bearing District in 1898 and was awarded an E.M. (Mining Engineer) degree.

== Timberman ==
At the age of 18 years he set up an assaying business in Victoria, Vancouver Island but was forced to close it due to lack of interest and joined his father's lumber business. His father was the first to obtain a timber licence from the government for 7,070 acres of land at Cowichan Lake. He built a sawmill at Snug Creek, Mahoney's Bay (now Genoa Bay). William John, known to his family as Will, ran his father's lumber business for ten years whilst his father was sheriff of Bruce County, Ontario.

== Political ambitions ==
Sutton stood in two elections for the Legislative Assembly of British Columbia. His first attempt was in 1887 after the death of Premier William Smithe when he stood for Cowichan but was narrowly beaten by Henry Fry. The second attempt was in 1894 when he stood for Cowichan and Alberni but was again narrowly defeated by Major J.M. Mutter.

== Government assayer ==
After tragedy struck the Sutton family when his cousin Alfred was accidentally shot, the sawmill was closed down and Will was appointed Government Assayer (1887-1889). A report he submitted to the Minister of Mines in 1888 includes a list of 35 examples of economic minerals found in the Province. An article in The Colonist describes his work as Government Assayer. Will was forced to resign to sort out his father's lumber business but under his management the assay office "had been converted to a model of its kind." Shortly after leaving his post he facilitated the sale of the family lumber business.

== Phrenology and grave robbing ==
William John and his brother James Edward, were both keen phrenologists (a pseudoscience that involves the measurement of bumps on the skull to predict mental traits) and had given several lectures in Victoria on the topic. In connection with phrenology they both began robbing the graves of First Nation people on Vancouver Island to sell the skulls to the American phrenology market. On hearing about their collection of 75 skulls Franz Boas, the 'father of American anthropology' bought the collection. Boas employed the Sutton brothers to collect more. Altogether the Sutton brothers provided Boas with about 200 skulls and skeletons. Boas used the skulls from the Northwest Coast to challenge the scientific idea of a 'pure race.' Franz Boas then sold the remains to Rudolph Virchow's Pathological Museum in Berlin and the Field Columbian Museum in Chicago.

== Sutton Lumber and Trading Company ==
The Sutton Lumber and Trading Company Limited was incorporated in 1893 with $100,000 and William, William John and James Edward Sutton were the first trustees. They acquired 2,500 acres of timber land in the Clayoqout District and West Coast of Vancouver Island, some of which were Crown granted and some held under timber leases from the Crown. William John and James Edward were amongst the first white settlers in Ucluelet where they built the first general store and sawmill. The company was eventually sold to W. H. and A. F. McEwan of Seattle, the principals in the Seattle Cedar Lumber Manufacturing Company. Sutton continued to own and manage the Ucluelet Mercantile Company Sawmill until his death.

== Geologist for James Dunsmuir ==
On his return to Victoria in 1900 Sutton took up the post of geologist for the coal and rail baron James Dunsmuir. In this position he worked for both the Wellington Colliery Company and the Esquimalt and Nanaimo Railway as well as being James Dunsmuir's personal geologist and in this role he travelled around British Columbia and further afield looking for opportunities to expand the Dunsmuir empire.

Sutton surveyed and geologically mapped much of Vancouver Island as the Wellington Colliery Company owned the coal rights under a large portion of the Island. As part of the Canadian Geological Survey, Sutton surveyed the central part of the eastern coast of Vancouver Island in July 1909. He remained with the Company when they were taken over by Canadian Pacific Railway until his death in 1914, from a heart attack, whilst running a survey line for a road being constructed in Ucluelet.

== Treasure Island ==
Sutton gave several public lectures on the natural wealth of Vancouver Island, including delivering a paper, The Geology and Mining of Vancouver Island, to the Geological Society in Manchester in 1903. He became a leader in the movement to promote the Island to the rest of the world and was instrumental in the establishment of the Vancouver Island Development League being elected to first vice-president of the Victoria branch of the League in 1911 and 1912.

== Forest preservation ==
William John Sutton was one of the first to advocate preservation of the forests in British Columbia. He gave evidence to several government commissions (1905, 1909) and in 1910 published, as a member of the Natural History Society, a booklet, Our Timber and its Conservation, in which he described 18 commercial species of forest trees. He argued that timber resources in British Columbia were comparatively limited and was critical of current government practice in regard to land leases and taxes. He recommended the government establish a forestry commission identifying key areas for research. He used his booklet to submit evidence to the Fulton Royal Commission on Timber and Forestry and some of his recommendations were accepted by the government. He gave further evidence to an Assessment and Taxation Commission in 1911 as well as to the Forestry and Conservation Convention in Vancouver in January 1914.

== Strathcona Park ==
As a member of the British Columbia Board of Trade, the Natural History Society and the Vancouver Island Development League, Sutton played an important role in helping to facilitate the establishment of Strathcona Provincial Park.

== Respected scientist ==
In his final years Sutton became a powerful person in British Columbia. He was Chairman of the Western Branch of the Canadian Mining Institute and vice-president of the Canadian Mining Institute (1914); as well as being a Fellow of the Royal Geological Society of London. He sat on the Board of Trade, and had been president of the Natural History Society (1912). He campaigned for a well-equipped seismological station at Victoria (a new Meteorological Station was built at Gonzales Height, Victoria in 1916) and was also a founding member of the Royal Astronomical Society in Victoria, being a member of the executive committee and instrumental in forming the Centre in Victoria.

== Pacific Museum of Earth, Vancouver ==
Sutton is credited with identifying 35 notable occurrences of minerals in Canada, see A List of Canadian Mineral Occurrences, Robert A.A. Johnson, 1915. His unique collection of minerals and fossils was one of the founding collections of the Geology Museum of the University of British Columbia at the Beaty Biodiversity Museum and is on show at the Pacific Museum of Earth, Vancouver.

== Legacy ==
William John Sutton's influence on Vancouver Island is visible in the places named after him, such as Sutton Pass, Sutton Boulders, Lost Shoe Creek and Sutton Rock; as well as the Sutton Limestones.

== Photograph album ==
His wife, Helen Annie, outlived Sutton by 18 years; she compiled an album of some of his photographs which her sister presented to the archive at the Royal British Columbia Museum in 1933. There are 57 photographs including geological features, First Nation villages, Cowichan Lake and river; and several 'ghost' towns on mainland British Columbia.

== Family history ==
William John Sutton was well known in his lifetime, but has since been forgotten. His father William Sutton built the first grist mill in Kincardine, Ontario and became the first sheriff of Bruce County only to be sacked after 25 years.
