= David G. Sorensen =

Canadian artist (1937-2011)

- Born: May 20, 1937; Vancouver, British Columbia, Canada
- Died: February 17, 2011 (aged 73); Montreal, Quebec, Canada
- Occupation: artist
- Spouse: Bella

David Sorensen RCA (May 20, 1937 – February 17, 2011) was a Canadian artist.

== Career ==
Born in Vancouver, British Columbia, Canada, Sorensen studied at the University of British Columbia and the Vancouver School of Art under Arthur Erickson (architecture), Bill Reid (sculpture) and Jack Shadbolt (painting) and bronze casting in Mexico (introduction to Zuniga's studio)) with a Theo Koerner grant. In 1965, he moved to Montreal, showed sculptures at Expo 67, and started to exhibit his paintings regularly across Canada: Espace Cinq, Gilles Corbeil, Waddington in Montreal; Wallack in Ottawa; Carmen Lamanna and Bau-Xi Gallery in Toronto; Bau-Xi in Vancouver. While in Montreal he held teaching positions at the Montreal Museum School of Art and Design, the Saidye Bronfman Centre and Dawson College (Viger, Vanier, and Selby campuses).

In 1976, he moved with his wife Bella and their new family to the Eastern Townships, built a solar house and a large studio and storage space and continued to paint and sculpt. Between 1981 and 2000, Sorensen taught studio art at Bishop's University in Sherbrooke. Over the years he has also frequently worked and exhibited in Mexico and is currently represented by Ramon Quiroga in Mexico City, Galeria Vertice and Haus der Kunst in Guadalajara. Current Canadian galleries include Studio 21 in Halifax, Moore Gallery, Toronto, Michael Gibson Gallery, London, and Virginia Christopher in Calgary. Sorensen died in 2011 in Montreal.

Sorensen's international exposure includes exhibits in Mexico City in 1964, Basel in 1974, Milan and Paris in 1975 and traveling exhibits between 1991 and 1993 in Tokyo, Manila and Hong Kong. In 1996, Sorensen was elected to the Royal Canadian Academy of Arts (RCA). He worked on numerous grants and commissions for the Canada Council for the Arts, the Quebec Cultural Ministry and private industry. His work is represented in public collections such as the Musee des beaux-arts de Montreal, Musee d'art contemporain de Montreal, Art Gallery of Nova Scotia, Hamilton Art Gallery, to mention a few. Among the more important private collections are Martineau Walker (Montreal and Vancouver), Avnet Shaw (New York), Cannel Films (Los Angeles), Collection Delbo (Italy), Heller Group (New Jersey), Imperial Oil (Calgary), Jannock Ltd (Toronto), Royal Bank of Canada (Toronto), Contemporary Fine Art Service (Vancouver).

== Selected sources ==
- Bourget, Charles. David Sorensen: Intimacy of Light. 2005, 143p, ISBN 2-920224-37-9
- Davis, Ann. David Sorensen: Intimacy of Light. 2005, 143p, ISBN 2-920224-37-9
- Fisette, Serge. David Sorensen: Intimacy of Light. 2005, 143p, ISBN 2-920224-37-9
- Gagnon, Francois-Marc..David Sorensen: Intimacy of Light 2005, 143p, ISBN 2-920224-37-9
- Grande, John K. David Sorensen: Abstraction from here to Now. 2001, 95p, ISBN 2-922769-02-X Grande, John K. Mexique, David *Sorensen: Horizon Series. Vie des Arts, No 196, p. 96, 2004.
- Perry, Art and Wood, Elizabeth. David Sorensen: Asian View. 1993, 63p, ISBN 2980272299. Lacroix, Laurier. David Sorensen: Suite de l'Estrie. 2003, 39p, ISBN 0-9680851-1-3
- Chandler, John Noel. 111 Dessins du Quebec, Musee d'Art Contemporain, Arts Canada, April 1976, Rosshandler, Leo. Sorensen: amant absolu de la couleur. Vie des Arts, No 186, p. 59, 2002.
