= Ann Lambert =

Canadian playwright and author

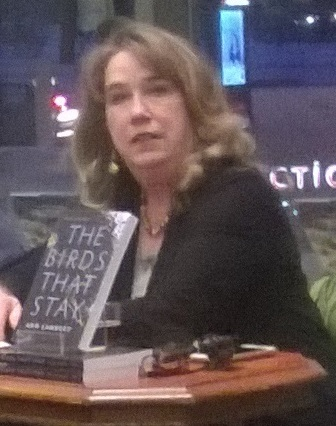
- Ann Lambert at a book signing in Montreal in March 2019
- Born: 1957 (age 68–69)
- Occupations: Writer and professor
- Spouse: David Abracen

Ann Lambert (born 1957) is a Montreal-based Canadian playwright and author. Her plays include Force of Circumstance, Parallel Lines and Very Heaven. Her debut novel, The Birds That Stay, was published in 2019. She also teaches at Dawson College.

== Early life ==
Lambert was born in 1957 and was raised in West Island, Quebec.

== Career ==
In 2019, Lambert along with Danielle Szydlowski, Laura Mitchell, and Lambert's daughter, Alice Abracen, founded the intergenerational women's collective, Théâtre Ouest End.

Lambert's first novel, a murder-mystery titled The Birds That Stay, was published in 2019 by Second Story Press. She released its sequel, The Dogs of Winter, in 2020.

Lambert retired in 2020 from teaching at Dawson College in Montreal.

== Works ==
=== Plays ===
- The Wall
- Force of Circumstance
- Parallel Lines
- The Pilgrimage
- Self Offense
- Very Heaven
- The Assumption of Empire

=== Novels ===
- The Birds That Stay (2019)
- The Dogs of Winter (2020)

== Personal life ==
Lambert is married to David Abracen, with whom she lives in Montreal. They have two children: a daughter, Alice, and a son, Isaac.
