= Dawson College =

Public college Montreal, Canada

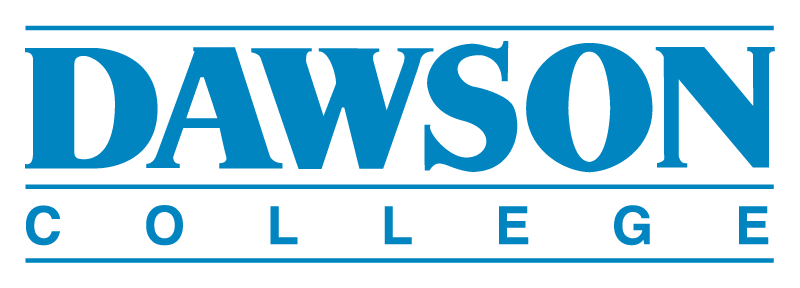
- Type: College
- Established: 1969
- Academic affiliations: CICan, CUP
- Provost: Leanne Bennett
- Director General: Diane Gauvin
- Students: 11,000
- Location: Montreal, Quebec, Canada; 45.4894°N 73.5883°W
- Campus: Urban, 4.85 ha (12 acres)
- Colours: Blue & white
- Nickname: Blues
- Sporting affiliations: CCAA, QSSF, CUSID
- Website: www.dawsoncollege.qc.ca
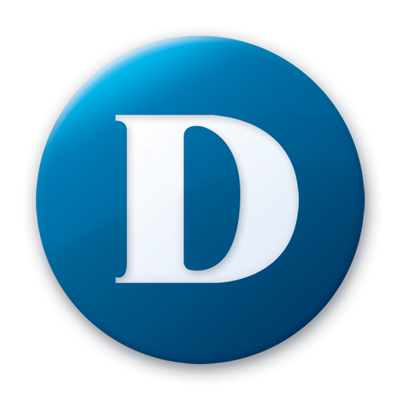

Dawson College is an English-language public college in Montreal, Quebec, Canada. The college is situated near the heart of Downtown Montreal in a former nunnery on approximately 12 acres (5 ha) of green space. It is the largest CEGEP in the province of Quebec, with a student population of approximately 8,000 day students and 3,000 evening students enrolled in more than 30 fields of study.

== History ==
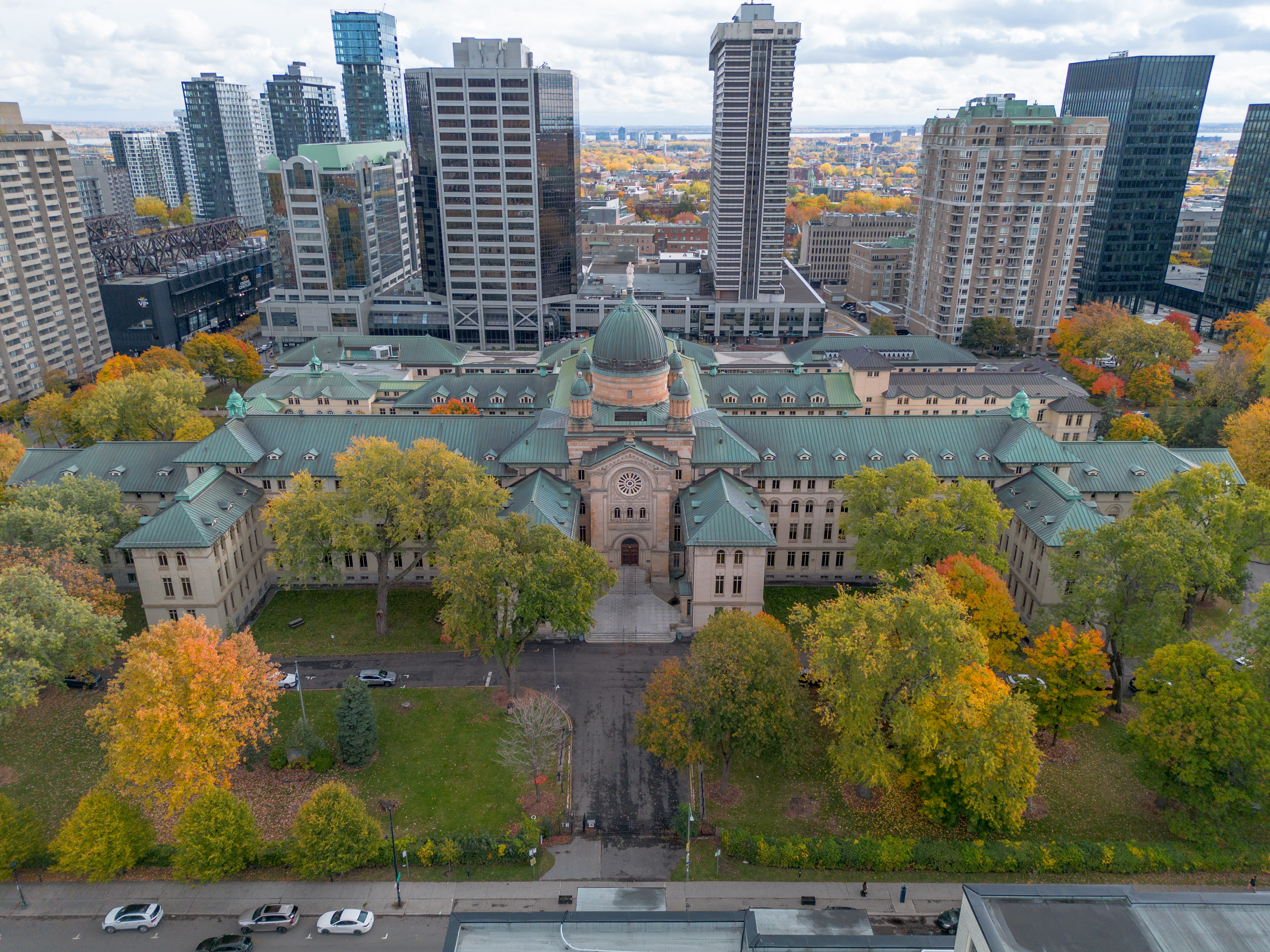
Dawson College in 2025

In September 1945, McGill University established a satellite campus called Sir William Dawson College at the Royal Canadian Air Force base in St. Johns (now Saint-Jean-sur-Richelieu), Quebec. This first incarnation of the college was set up to handle the overflow registration of servicemen after the Second World War. Populated mainly by engineering and science students who were required to live onsite, the college operated for five years. It was named after Sir William Dawson, a principal of McGill University from 1855 to 1893.

After the General Vocational College Act came into effect in June 1967, Dawson College became the first English-language institution in the new CEGEP network. It opened its doors in September 1969 to 1,655 students. The college was originally housed in a converted pharmaceutical factory at 350 Selby Street in Westmount. In 1970, a second campus, used mostly for Creative Arts programs, was opened on Viger Street just to the north of Old Montreal. During the next few years, additional spaces were rented across the city such as 4333 Ste. Catherine St. W. (Data Processing, Continuing Education), the Show Mart at Berri (gym), Dome Theatre on Notre Dame St., the Richelieu Building at 990 du Couvent and the La Fontaine building on Sherbrooke Street East. Finally, in 1975, the Victoria Campus was added at 485 McGill St.

In August 1982, the college signed an agreement to acquire the Mother House of the Sisters of the Congrégation de Notre-Dame in order to unify its fourteen separate locations. The campus opened in 1988, and consolidation happened in 1997 when the Selby Campus was closed.

In August 2010, because of an increase in CEGEP enrollments, the college was faced again with a lack of space. The fourth floor of the Pepsi Forum on Atwater Street was leased, allowing for the addition of new classrooms. The P Wing is equipped with six classrooms for regular day DEC students and one classroom and a computer laboratory for AEC students. A security office and student lounge were also added. In 2011, an additional 4 rooms were added to the 4th floor for general study. In 2018, Dawson leased additional space on the Forum 2nd floor, adding general classrooms, active learning rooms and 4 labs for the college Physiotherapy Technology Program.

In 2020, the college was awarded the gold rating for leadership in sustainability by The Sustainability Tracking, Assessment & Rating System (STARS). The college's initiatives include, among other things, a pledge to carbon neutrality, rooftop gardens, certificate programs in Sustainable Happiness, and a student-led initiative to compost waste.

== Programs ==
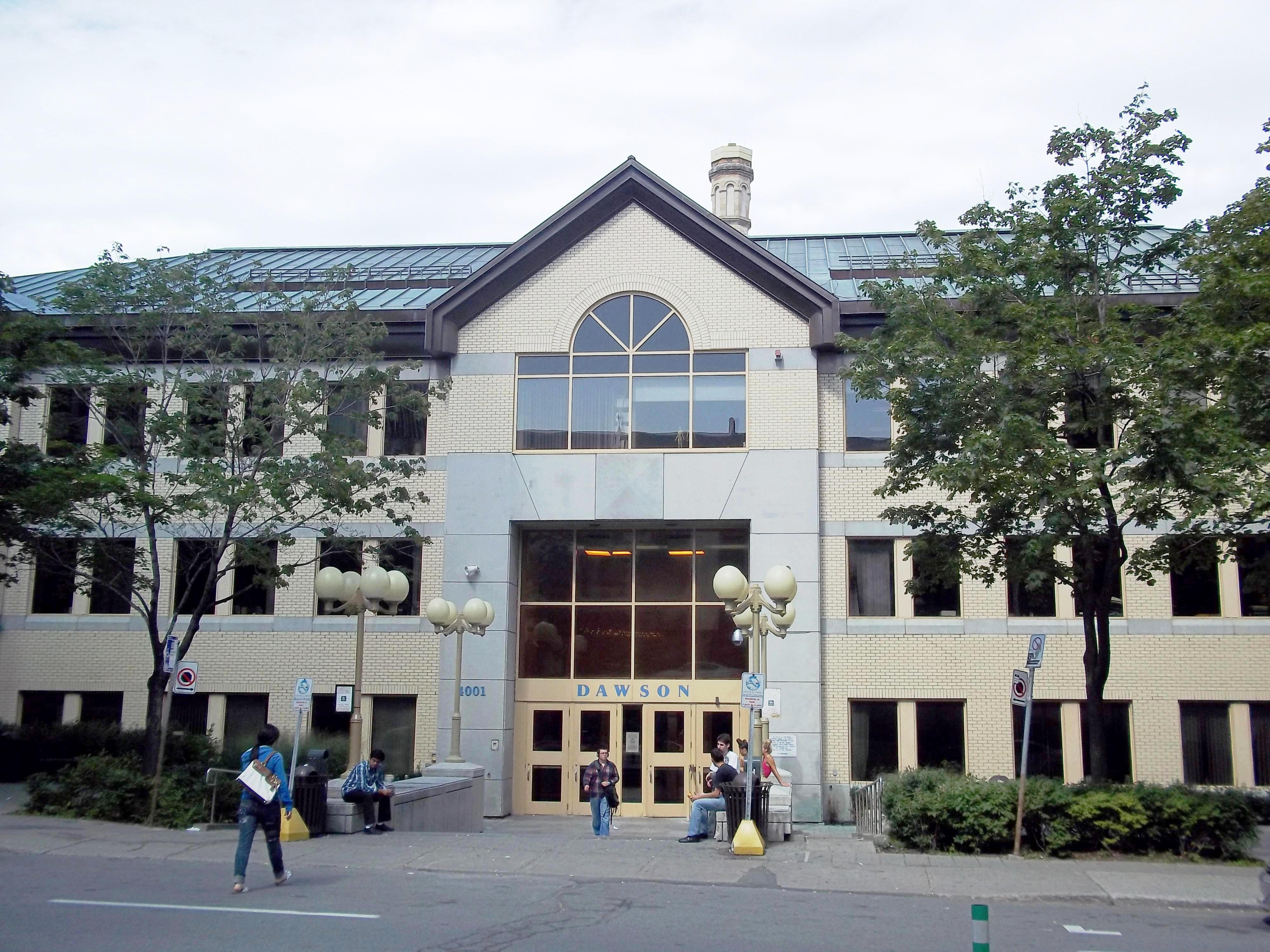
The de Maisonneuve entrance of Dawson College

The CEGEP offers two types of programs: pre-university and career/technical. Pre-university programs take two years to complete and cover subject matter that roughly corresponds to the additional year of high school given elsewhere in Canada, as well as university-level introductory courses that prepare students for their chosen field in university. Technical programs take three years to complete and allow graduates to enter the workforce or to pursue their studies at a university level.

Evening courses are offered through continuing education in both credit and non-credit divisions. Corporate training is available as well.

=== Pre-university programs ===
- Creative & Applied Arts
  - Arts, Literature and Communication (ALC)
    - Arts and Culture
    - Cinema-Communications
    - Interactive Media Arts
    - Languages
    - Literature
    - Studio Arts
  - Visual Arts
- Science, Medical Studies & Engineering
  - Science
    - Pure and Applied Science
    - Health Science
    - Enriched Science (formerly known as First Choice Science)
      - Enriched Pure and Applied Science
      - Enriched Health Science
    - Environmental Science
    - Explorations Science
    - Developmental Science
  - Science, Computer Science, and Mathematics
- Social Science & Business Technologies
  - Social Science
    - General Social Science
    - Commerce
    - Child Studies
    - Environmental Studies
    - International Business Studies
    - Law, Society and Justice
    - Social Change and Solidarity (similar to former North-South Studies)
    - Psychology
    - Travel and Tourism
  - Liberal Arts

Pre-university programs usually require four semesters (two years) to complete.

==== Enriched Science ====
Formerly named First Choice Science, Dawson College's honours science program is known as Enriched Science. Enrolled students can choose between the Pure and Applied Science or the Health Science profiles.

=== Career/technical programs ===
- Creative & Applied Arts
  - 3D Animation and Computer Generated Imagery
  - Graphic Design
  - Illustration
  - Industrial Design
  - Interior Design
  - Professional Photography
  - Professional Theatre
- Science, Medical Studies, and Engineering
  - Biomedical Laboratory Technology
  - Civil Engineering Technology
  - Diagnostic Imaging
  - Electrical Engineering Technology
  - Laboratory Technology – Analytical Chemistry
  - Mechanical Engineering Technology
  - Nursing
  - Physiotherapy Technology
  - Radiation Oncology
- Social Science and Business Technology
  - Accounting and Management Technology
  - Business Management (Marketing)
  - Community Recreation and Leadership Training
  - Computer Science Technology
  - Social Service

Career/technical programs usually require six semesters (three years) to complete.

=== Special areas of study ===
- Creative and Applied Arts
  - Hellenic Studies
  - Jewish Studies
  - Peace Studies Certificate
  - Women's / Gender Studies
- Social Science & Business Technologies
  - New School (see section below)
  - Reflections (see section below)

The time required to complete a program in the special areas of study varies.

==== New School ====
New School takes a Critical Humanistic approach to learning and allows students to do their English and Humanities courses in a smaller group setting.

==== Reflections ====
Reflections offers double-credit courses which allow students an alternative way to complete their English, French, Humanities and History course requirements. Using seminar-style settings, Reflections offers a different yet effective pedagogical approach, which include teacher-led discussions and short lectures.

=== General education courses ===
In addition to concentration courses, students are required to complete general education courses in order to graduate. These core courses include four English courses, two French courses, three humanities courses, and three physical education courses.

Most students must also pass two complementary courses outside their area of study. Students are awarded a Diploma of College Studies upon completion of their program of study and the successful writing of the Quebec English Exit Exam.

=== Certificate programs offered by the Sustainability Office ===
- Sustainable Happiness Certification
- Sustainable Happiness Facilitator Training Certification

== Dawson Student Union ==
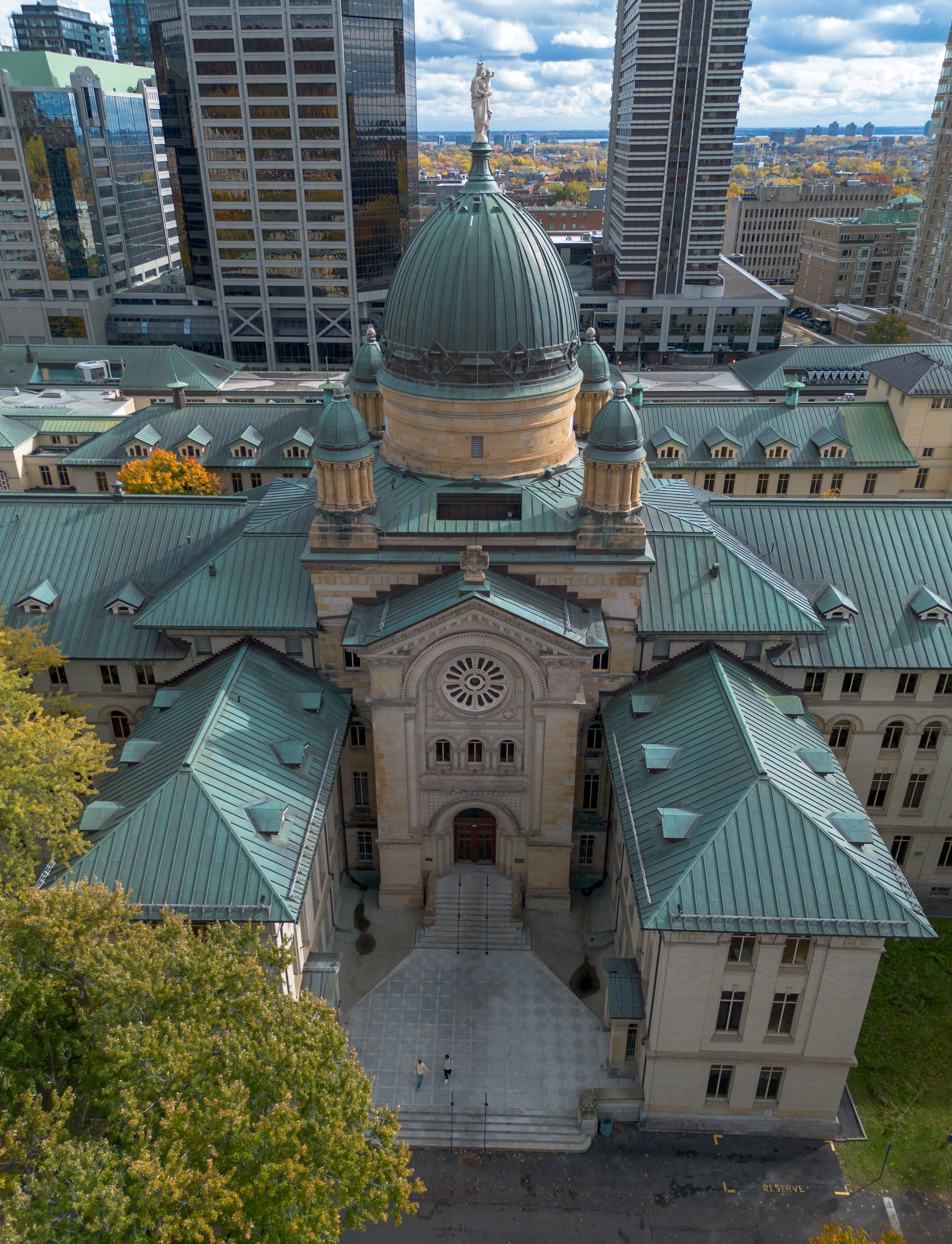
Dawson College's entrance on Sherbrooke Street

The Dawson Student Union (DSU) is the Dawson College students' union representing the approximately 7,500 full-time students and 2,500 part-time students. It funds, coordinates and regulates clubs and activities and is a resource for students to direct them to appropriate departments and services. The union also does its part to inform students of their rights and lobbies for them when necessary.

In November 2008, the Dawson Student Union contacted Montreal police after an estimated $840,000 in union funds were misappropriated. This came after much criticism towards the union for not publishing financial statements since its 2005 accreditation.

The DSU has since been a functional, autonomous, accredited student union since 2005.

== Campus activities ==
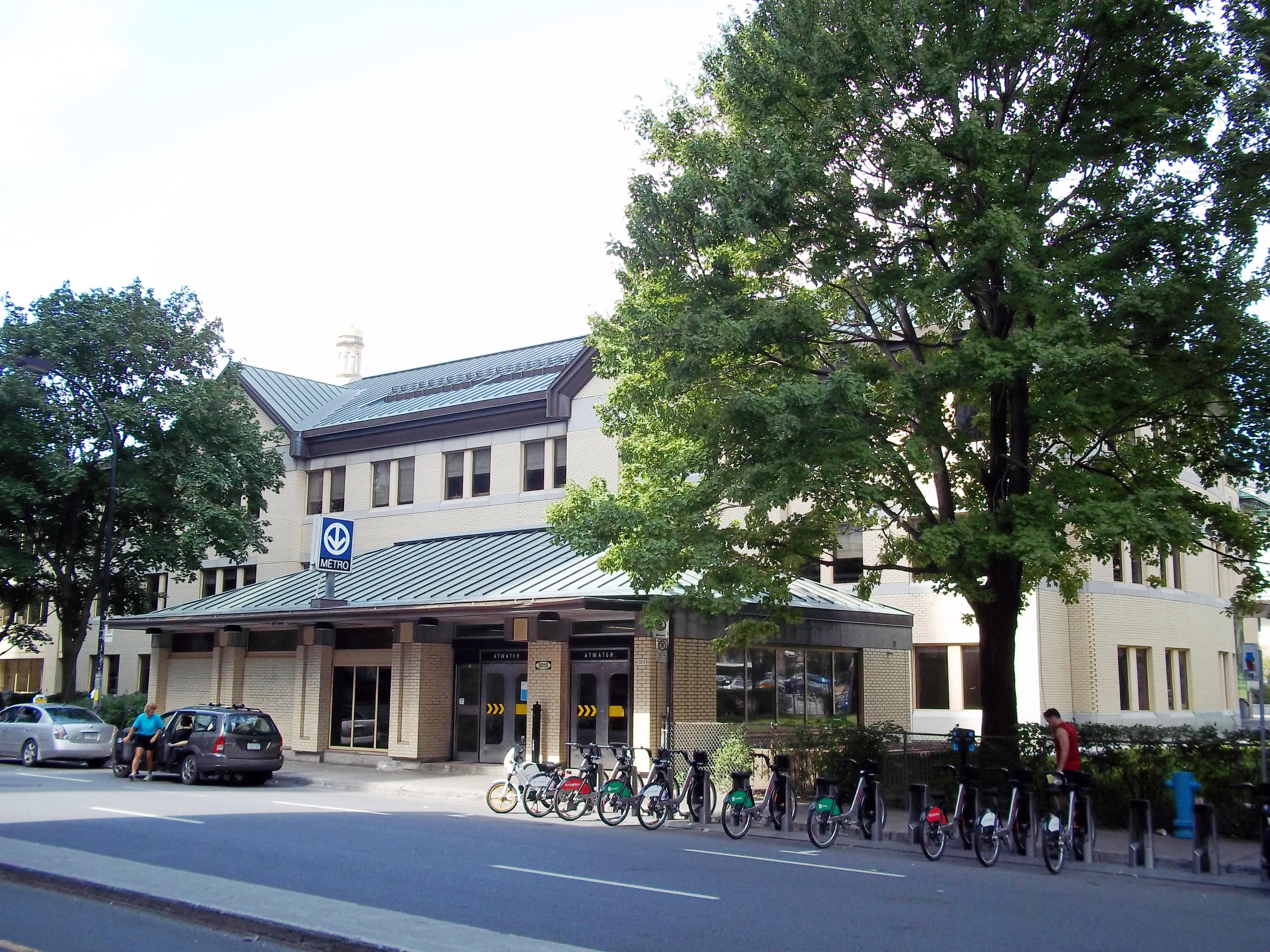
Dawson College behind the Atwater metro station

Dawson College has a number of clubs, 825 officially funded by the DSU and eight that receive no funding. These include religious and language-themed clubs, para-academic groups, athletic clubs, program-based clubs, Pokémon club, cultural clubs and more. Dawson also has a radio station, CIXS: The Edge, as well as a student newspaper, The Plant, which publishes every month during term, with a circulation, in 2012, of about 1,350 copies. Founded in 1969, it is a member of Canadian University Press (CUP), and is the largest CEGEP newspaper in Quebec. Editors are chosen at the end of each semester (August–December, January–May) for the upcoming semester based on a democratic vote by the previous editors and the 'Writing for The Plant' class. There is another paper published annually at Dawson College, the Dawson Research Journal of Experimental Science (colloquially known as DrJes). This journal is completely student-run and student submitted. The articles are published after being edited by a board of student editors and then undergo evaluation by referees who are experts in the field. Volume 1 of DrJes was issued in 1999 and at that time was the first journal of its kind in North America.

Most clubs can be found in the 2C wing of the college, which is in the center of the building at street-level. The athletics department is located in the 1H wing, which is at metro-level, in the south-west corner of the school. New clubs can be formed with the help of the DSU.

== Campus athletics ==
Dawson College sports teams are known as the Blues. The Blues boast one of the largest intercollegiate programs in Canada. A large number of recreational and intramural programs are offered to the student population. Although the college offers a wide variety of sports to its student body, the national governing body of college athletics, the Canadian Colleges Athletic Association (CCAA), only sanctions five sports nationally: basketball, soccer, golf, badminton, and cross-country running. Of these five sports, Dawson College competes nationally in all but badminton.

The Dawson College Blues women's ice hockey program participates in the RSEQ women's ice hockey conference of the CCAA. Many Blues alumnae continue on to careers in elite university and/or professional leagues, and several have represented their respective nations in the Olympic Games.

Dawson has an athletic therapy clinic.

Some of Dawson's highlights from its athletic history include winning the Men's Provincial Hockey Championships and having the Canadian Colleges Athletic Association award the Dawson College Blues a banner representing "25 Years of Basketball Supremacy".

== School shooting ==
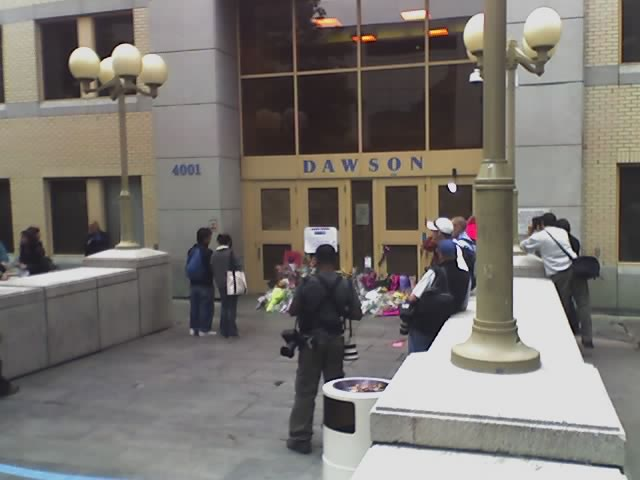
Two days after the tragic event, people bring flowers to the de Maisonneuve entrance of Dawson College where the first gunshots had been fired.

On September 13, 2006, a mass shooting occurred at Dawson College. Kimveer Gill, a 25-year-old resident of Laval, Quebec, approached the school and began firing at students outside of the entrance. He proceeded to shoot inside the school before committing suicide after being shot by a police officer. Eighteen-year-old student Anastasia Rebecca de Sousa died at the scene. Nineteen other people were injured, eight critically.

The college was closed until September 15, when teachers and support staff returned. Students were given access to the campus on September 18, and classes resumed the following day, on September 19.

After the shooting, Dawson College provided grief counselling to its students and staff and a research team conducted a three-year study on the psychological impact of the shooting.

=== Peace Garden ===
On September 13, 2011, the ecological Peace Garden on the campus grounds was inaugurated to become a “living memorial” for de Sousa. A CTV News report framed the garden project and the accompanying Living Campus program as a demonstration of the college community's healing and resilience. The 20,000 square-foot garden was designated an urban biodiversity site in 2014 by Espace pour la vie Montréal.

== Controversies ==
During the 2012–2013 academic school year, student Ahmed Al-Khabaz was working on an app to give students access to their online records from mobile devices. While developing the application, he and another student discovered a security hole in a third-party student records system.

Al-Khabaz and his colleague reported the issue to the college administration and were congratulated. They were told the problem would be fixed immediately. However, days later, when Al-Khabaz ran a web vulnerability scanner on the college's servers to see whether the problem had been resolved, Skytech company president Edward Taza called Al-Khabaz and accused him of performing a cyber attack. Taza spoke of the possibility of legal action and imprisonment and suggested Al-Khabaz sign an agreement to tell no one about the flaw, which Al-Khabaz did. After signing the non-disclosure agreement, the college expelled Al-Khabaz and his appeal to tell his side of the story was denied.

At first, the college refused to comment on the expulsion, stating that they could not discuss individual student situations. However, due to overwhelming public pressure, they said at a press conference that the student had been warned not to attempt to test the security of the system.

== Notable people ==
=== Alumni ===
- Joel Anthony – former NBA player and 2x champion
- Michael Applebaum - Mayor of Montreal 2012-13
- Maria Barile – disability rights activist
- Jeff Barnaby – writer, composer, and film director
- Annie Briard – artist
- Bianca Farella – Canadian Olympic medalist
- Jeff Fuchs – explorer and author
- Michael Greenspan – director and screenwriter, Wrecked
- Kaniehtiio Horn – film and television actress
- Meryam Joobeur – film director
- Luc Lafortune – lighting designer
- Jon Lajoie – comedian
- Jessica Lanyadoo – astrologer and psychic medium
- Shira Lazar – Internet talk show host
- Rachelle Lefevre – actress in movies such as Twilight
- Michael Mando – actor
- Seb McKinnon – freelance illustrator (known for Magic: The Gathering illustrations) and filmmaker
- Harley Morenstein – host of the popular YouTube series Epic Meal Time
- Steven Pinker – psychologist
- Marie-Philip Poulin – Canadian Olympic medalist
- Meaghan Rath – actress
- Allison Russell – singer-songwriter
- SeXXXy Eddy – professional wrestler; real name Eddy Dorozowsky
- Michael Zelniker – actor and filmmaker
- Prosper Karangwa - Professional Basketball Player and GM of GLeague Team

=== Faculty ===
- Will Aitken — film studies, novelist, journalist and film critic
- Frédéric Bastien — history, author, historian, and journalist
- Jill Britton — mathematics
- Ariel Fenster — science educator
- Michael Harris — poet and translator
- Keith Harrison — English, novelist
- Ann Lambert — English, playwright and novelist
- Susan J. Palmer — religious studies
- Jocelyn Parr — history, novelist
- Ross H. Paul — former Dean of Arts and Academic Dean
- Susan Pinker — author
- Tony Proudfoot — physical education, former CFL player
- T. F. Rigelhof — writer
- Francis Scarpaleggia — business administration, Member of Parliament for Lac-Saint-Louis
- Lorraine Simms — painter
- Ray Smith — English, author
- David G. Sorensen — artist
- Chaim Tannenbaum — philosophy, musician

== See also ==
- List of colleges in Quebec
- Higher education in Quebec
