= Annie Briard =

Canadian artist

- Born: Montreal, Quebec
- Education: Concordia University; Emily Carr University of Art and Design
- Known for: Photographer

Annie Briard is a Canadian intermedia visual artist based in Vancouver, British Columbia. Her video art, conceptual photography, and installation art works explore the intersections of perceptual paradigms between psychology, neuroscience and existentialism, challenges the uncertain nature of perception itself, and memory.

== Biography ==
Born in Montreal, Quebec, Briard attended Dawson College before earning a B.F.A from Concordia University in 2008 and an M.F.A in 2013 from Emily Carr University of Art and Design in Vancouver, Canada, where she is currently a Lecturer in the Faculty of Art.

== Select group exhibitions ==
- Quebec Biennale Manif d'art 10, la Bande Video gallery, Staring at the Sun, an immersive experience that produces lingering images, illusions of movement and chimeric colours in the spectators’ minds.
- WAVE POOL, Field Projects, NY Constructions 5 – Ruby's Mirages, and Paracosm M – The Sun Meets the Moon , stereoscopic photographs questioning and exploring the limits of our perception through buzzing illustrations of landscape and open ocean.
- 'L'instabilité du réel' (2019), Papier art fair, Monica Reyes Gallery, Montreal, curated by Thi-My Truong, touring exhibition across Quebec.

== Select solo exhibitions ==
- 2024 Through Walls of Gold, Royale Projects, Los Angeles "The works in her exhibition [...] share a kinship with the California Light and Space artists and [...] in this installation she enhances her photographs with transparent three-dimensional acrylic elements in a range of colors. The photographs depict desert landscapes and were taken during residencies at the High Desert Test Sites in Joshua Tree, CA.
- 2019 Second Sight, AC Institute, New York, NY "By working with extensions of the eye (lens, camera, moving image), Briard is able to shift from the imaginary to the nature of “reality" and media itself."
- 2018 Pop-Up Home, New Westminster Museum and Archives
- 2017 Paracosmic Sun, Back Gallery Project, Vancouver "The work in Paracosmic Sun projects and presents multiple temporal states simultaneously, states of seeing and not seeing, and also states where sight extends beyond the normal range or perception."
- 2016 Staring at the Sun, Joyce Yahouda Gallery, Montreal In his review of the exhibition, art critic Edwin Janzen states that "for the visitor, a subtle questioning of sensory perception and reality is certainly the result."
- 2016 Vision Trouble, La Maison des Artistes, Winnipeg
- 2013 The Woods, VIVO Media Arts Centre, Vancouver "The psychology of agency and rebellious obedience are what comes to mind in engaging with this technological art piece."

== Residencies ==
In 2012, Briard completed a residency at the Banff Centre in Canada. In 2016, she completed an artist residency in Linea de Costa, Cadiz, Spain, in which she produced experimental works based on her research on how the human eye works. In 2017, she completed an artist residency at the AC Institute in New York, and in the following year, she completed two other residencies in ESXLA, Los Angeles and in Samband íslenskra myndlistarmanna (SIM), Reykjavik.

== Awards ==
Briard's first award was the Bombardier Graduate Scholarship in 2012, given to her by the Social Sciences & Humanities Research Council, and in 2013 they awarded her with the Research for a Better Life Award. In 2016, Briard received a project grant from the Vidéographe, Programme de soutien à la création. In 2016 the British Columbia Arts Council awarded her with a Production grant in the visual arts, and in 2018 she received a second production grant from them for media arts. In 2018 and 2020, the Canada Council for the Arts awarded her with an Explore and Create Production grant.
