= Jill Britton =

Canadian mathematics educator

Jill E. Britton (6 November 1944 – 29 February 2016) was a Canadian mathematics educator known for her educational books about mathematics.

== Career ==
Britton was born on 6 November 1944. She taught for many years, at Dawson College in Westmount, Quebec, moving in the late 1980s to Camosun College in Victoria, British Columbia. At Camosun, she taught mathematics mainly to young women aiming to become elementary school teachers. Her own teaching had the goal of changing these students' attitude about mathematics from fear to enthusiasm. She retired in 2015, and died on 29 February 2016.

== Publications ==
Britton was the author of mathematics books including:

- Introduction to Tessellations (with Dale Seymour, Dale Seymour Publications, 1989)
- Tessellation Teaching Masters (with Dale Seymour, Dale Seymour Publications, 1989)
- Teaching Tessellating Art: Activities and Transparency Masters (with Walter Britton, Dale Seymour Publications, 1992)
- Explorations with Tesselmania! Activities for Math and Art Classrooms (Dale Seymour Publications, 1997)
- Investigating Patterns: Symmetry and Tessellations (Dale Seymour Publications, 2000)
- Polyhedra Pastimes (Dale Seymour Publications, 2001)

She was also known for her "spectacular web site on symmetry and tessellations".

== Recognition ==
Britton was the 2008–2009 winner of the Teaching Excellence Award of the Association of Canadian Community Colleges.
