= Maria Barile =

Canadian disability rights activist (1953–2013)

- Born: 1953
- Died: July 24, 2013 (aged 59)
- Education: Dawson College; McGill University

Maria Barile (1953 – 24 July 2013) was a Canadian disability rights activist, who focused specifically on the rights of disabled women.

== Biography ==
Barile had hearing loss and a neurological disorder. She was from Quebec.

She received a diploma from Dawson College, where she started its first support group for students with disabilities. She went on to complete a qualifying year in order to study at McGill University, where she obtained a bachelor's and a master's degree in social science, graduating top of her class. Barile's thesis was on the dual oppression experienced by women with disabilities; during her time at university, she became aware that the issues facing women with disabilities were not being addressed by the mainstream feminist movement in Canada.

After graduating during the 1980s, Barile worked as an employment counsellor for people with disabilities at L'ÉTAPE, in addition to delivering workshops on ableism and disability. She became involved in the disability rights movement in Montreal, including in 1988 taking part in demonstrations protesting the inaccessibility of the Montreal Metro.

In 1985, Barile was among 17 women with disabilities who co-founded the DisAbled Women's Network of Canada (Dawn Canada), a national feminist network composed of women with disabilities. Less than a year later, she also was one of the co-founders of Action des femmes handicapées de Montréal (now known as Action Femmes et Hendicap), focused on women in the city of Montreal.

In 1993, Barile published Women with Disabilities Define System-Based Discrimination (1993), which was based in part on her university thesis. In it, Barile described disabled women in Canada as an "exploited underclass" who were subjected to discrimination on the basis of bodily difference and social isolation and exclusion, in addition to exploitation within institutional settings. In the 1990s and 2000s, Barile took part in various commissions to advice on women's issues including contraception and domestic abuse to raise awareness of how these impacted upon women with disabilities. She co-founded two companies, including ADAPTECH, a research lab focusing on assistive technology and post-secondary education, and ÉcoACCESS, which consulted on universal accessibility and sustainable development.

In 2011, to mark the 25th anniversary of the founding of Dawn Canada, Barile gave a speech in which she stated her belief that social change could for women with disabilities could not occur within the same structures that excluded them, and that therefore the structures need to be replaced with "more egalitarian structures".

Barile died on 24 July 2013 at the Hôpital du Sacré-Cœur de Montréal at the age of 59. At the time of her death, she was studying for a master's degree in inclusive design at the University of Salford in the United Kingdom. Her degree was awarded posthumously. Barile had also been working with Dawn Canada on a project to support women's shelters and transition homes for survivors of domestic abuse to become more accessible for women with disabilities.

== Legacy ==
Since 2016, Action Femmes et Handicap has biannually given the Maria Barile Award, to recognise a woman or group of women who have made a significant social contribution by promoting feminist values and working to improve the lives of women with disabilities.
