= Beaty Biodiversity Museum =

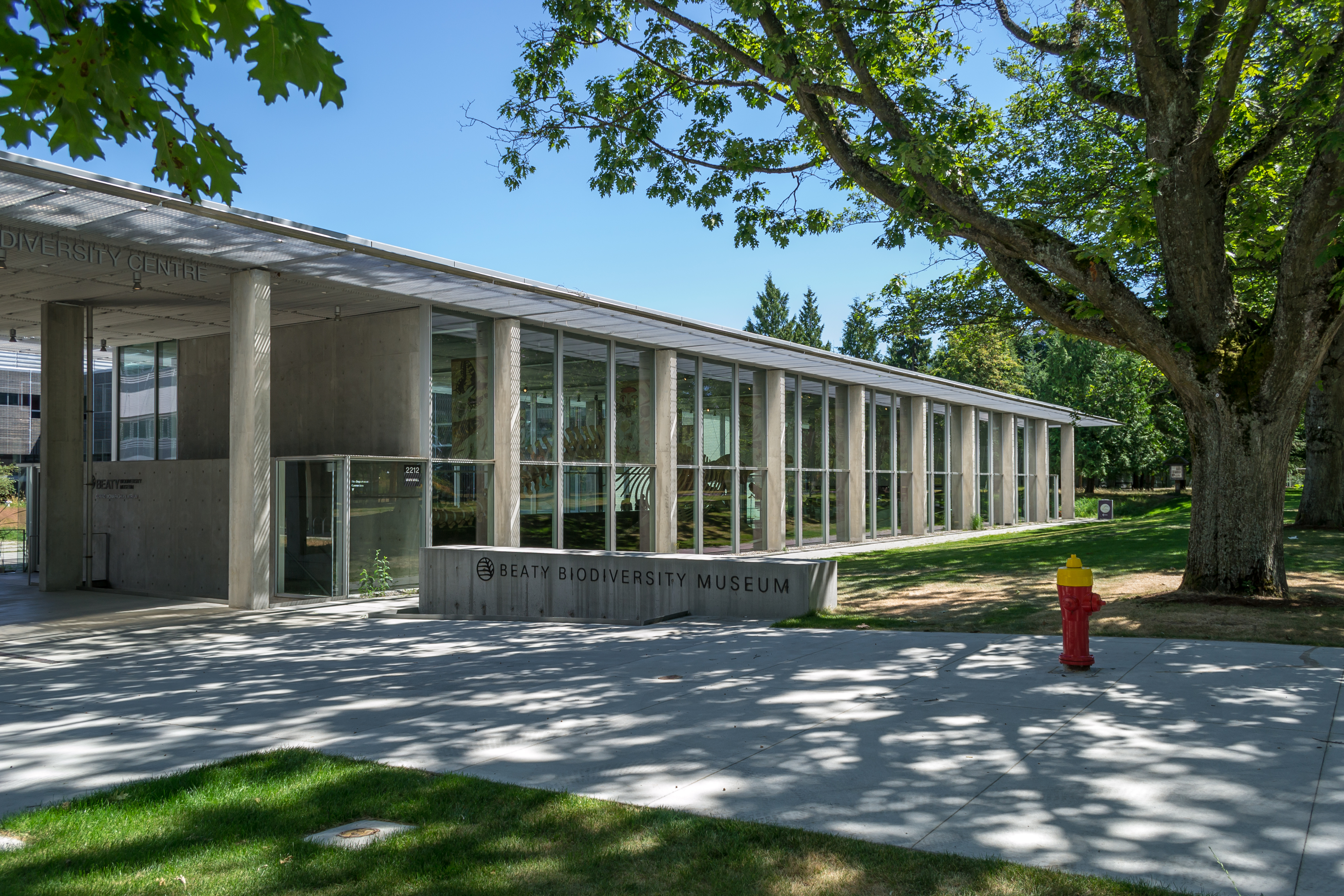

- Location in Vancouver
- Established: 2010
- Location: 2212 Main Mall, University of British Columbia, Vancouver, British Columbia, Canada
- Coordinates: 49.2636°N 123.2514°W
- Type: Natural History Museum
- Visitors: 42,367 (2017–18)
- Director: Quentin Cronk
- Website: beatymuseum.ubc.ca

The Beaty Biodiversity Museum is a natural history museum in Vancouver, British Columbia, Canada, located on the campus of the University of British Columbia. Its 20,000 square feet (1,900 square metres) of collections and exhibit space were first opened to the public on October 16, 2010; since then it has received over 35,000 visitors per year.

Its collections include over two million specimens collected between the 1910s and the present, comprising the Cowan Tetrapod Collection, the Marine Invertebrate Collection, the Fossil Collection, the Herbarium, the Spencer Entomological Collection, and the Fish Collection. The collections focus in particular on the species of British Columbia, Yukon, and the Pacific Coast. The museum's most prominent display is a 25-metre (82-foot) skeleton of a female blue whale buried in Tignish, Prince Edward Island, which is suspended over the ramp leading to the main collections.

== Location and access ==
The Beaty Biodiversity Museum and the Biodiversity Research Centre are located in the Beaty Biodiversity Centre at the University of British Columbia (UBC). The complex's address is 2212 Main Mall, Point Grey, Vancouver, British Columbia. Directly adjacent to the museum is the UBC Fisheries Centre which features an atrium display of skeletons of a minke whale, a killer whale, two Steller sea lions, and three Pacific white-sided dolphins.

=== Facility ===
The centre is housed in a 11,520 square metres (124,000 square feet), four-storey building. The building was designed by Patkau Architects in 2009 and built by Scott Construction. It formed the final side of a landscaped quadrangle created by the 2006 construction of the Aquatic Ecosystems Research Laboratory.

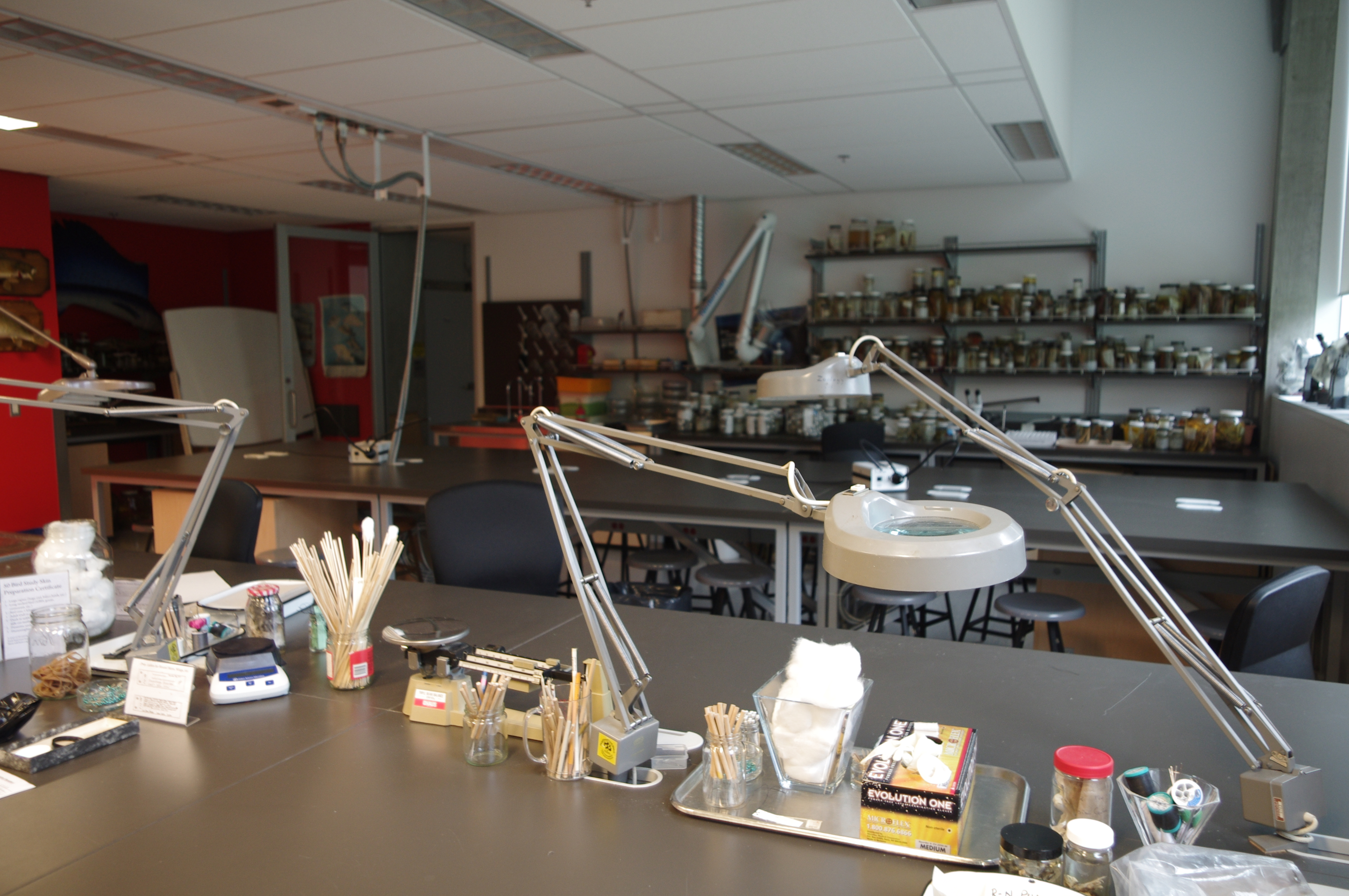
The Beaty Biodiversity Museum features several laboratories

The museum includes a theatre and 20,000 square feet (1,900 square metres) of collections and exhibit space. It is entered through the Mowafaghian Atrium, a glass-walled gallery two storeys tall which, in addition to the museum's gift shop and the Niche Cafe, houses the museum's signature piece: Canada's largest blue whale skeleton. The display is a "see-through box" whose façade windows have "steel mesh brises-soleils". The museum lies parallel to one of the main walking routes of the university campus, was described in Exploring Vancouver: the architectural guide as "a perfect commission for architects known for creative restraint". The whale is suspended over a descending ramp by which the collections are accessed. The space also includes a "family zone" with juvenile reading materials and a teaching collection in a Discovery Lab. Most of the collections are displayed in cabinet windows and shadow boxes, although a few are shown through alternative displays like in-ground "excavations" that under glass that visitors can walk on.

The $50-million building was designed in the interests of sustainability. It has a green roof and a reed water garden to reduce pollutants and improve drainage of storm water from the building. The centre does not have air conditioning, except in some of its laboratories; instead, the temperature level is mediated by natural ventilation through the facility's concrete walls and by the use of sunshades on the outside of the building. Natural lighting is also optimized to reduce the building's use of electricity, which also assists in the preservation of some light-sensitive collections. Finally, the centre includes several "recycling hubs" and has facilities for the composting of organic waste material.

== Museum history ==
The individual collections housed in the Beaty Biodiversity Museum predate the museum's construction, with some collections dating back to the early 20th century. All of these collections, however, were kept separately at various locations across campus. The idea for a single museum to house all of these collections was first put forward in 2001 by university faculty in the Departments of Zoology and Botany, who suggested "a building that would facilitate interdisciplinary work on biodiversity, house UBC's biodiversity researchers and collections, and contain a public natural history museum". What would become the dynamic working and learning environment of the Beaty Biodiversity Museum benefited from the inspired architectural design and work of Patkau Architects.

The museum is named after Ross and Trisha Beaty, UBC alumni who donated Can$8 million in funding to support its creation. The Biodiversity Centre also received $16.5 million from each of the BC Knowledge Development Fund and the Canadian Foundation for Innovation, $3 million from the Djavad Mowafaghian Foundation, and $6 million from the university. The founding director was Dr. Wayne Maddison and the current director is Dr. Quentin Cronk of the Department of Botany.

== Collection ==
The museum houses a collection of more than two million specimens, some dating back to as early as the 1910s. These specimens are divided into six main subcollections – the Cowan Tetrapod Collection, the Marine Invertebrate Collection, the Herbarium, the Spencer Entomological Collection, the Fish Collection, and the Fossil Collection – and over 500 permanent exhibits. Most items are accompanied by a description card briefly outlining details like the species and provenance information.

=== Blue Whale Exhibit ===
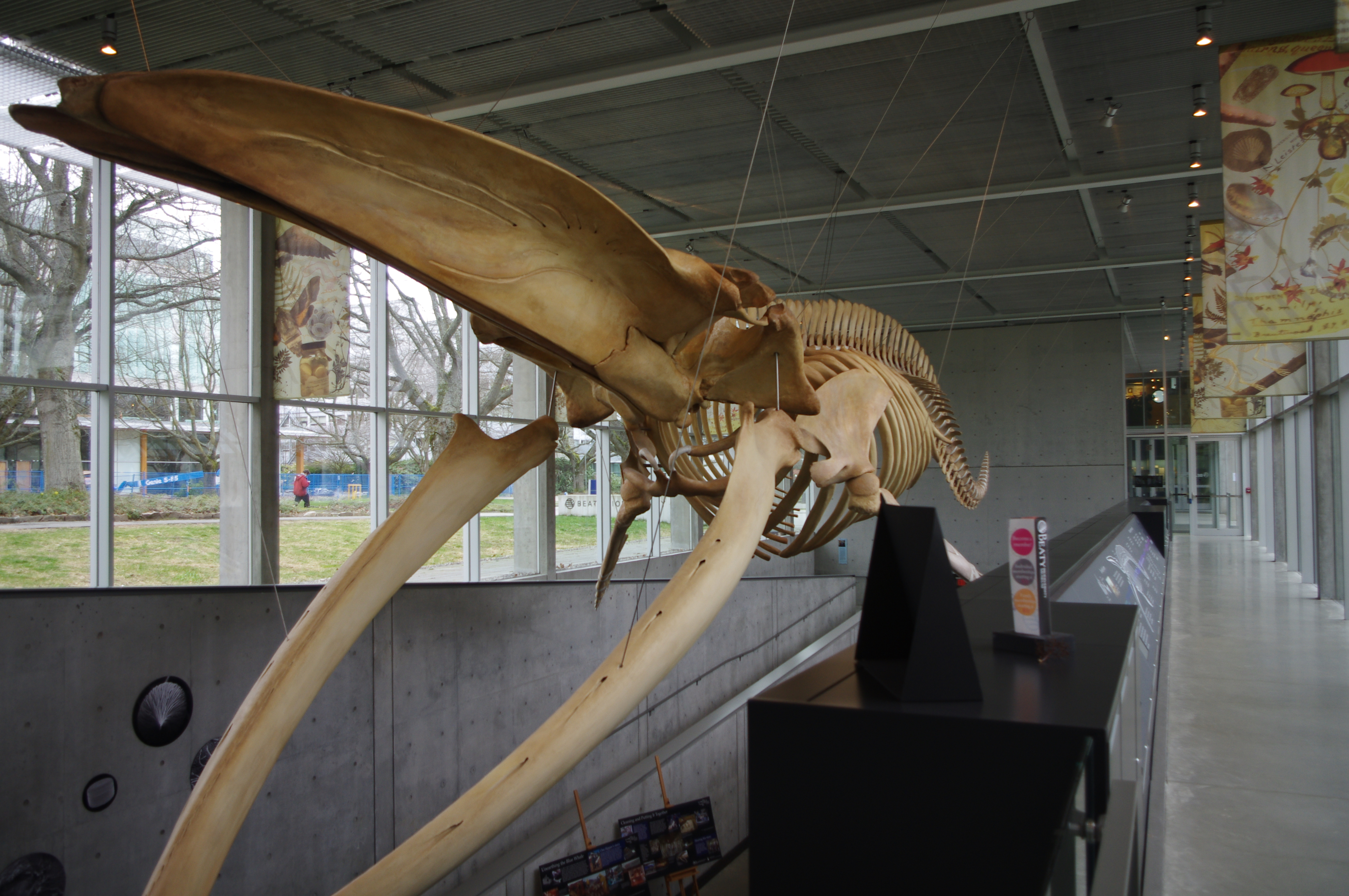
A skeleton of a female blue whale at the Mowafaghian Atrium

The museum's signature piece is its 25-metre skeleton of a female blue whale. The skeleton, housed in the museum's glass atrium, is Canada's largest blue whale skeleton, the "largest skeleton exhibit in the world suspended without external framework for support", and one of only 21 blue whale skeletons on public display worldwide. The Canadian Museum of Nature in Ottawa began exhibiting its juvenile blue whale skeleton at around the same time.

The process of recovering, transporting and displaying the whale was featured in a Discovery Channel documentary called Raising Big Blue, first aired in Canada on June 5, 2011. This documentary is frequently screened at the museum's theatre.

=== Cowan Tetrapod Collection ===
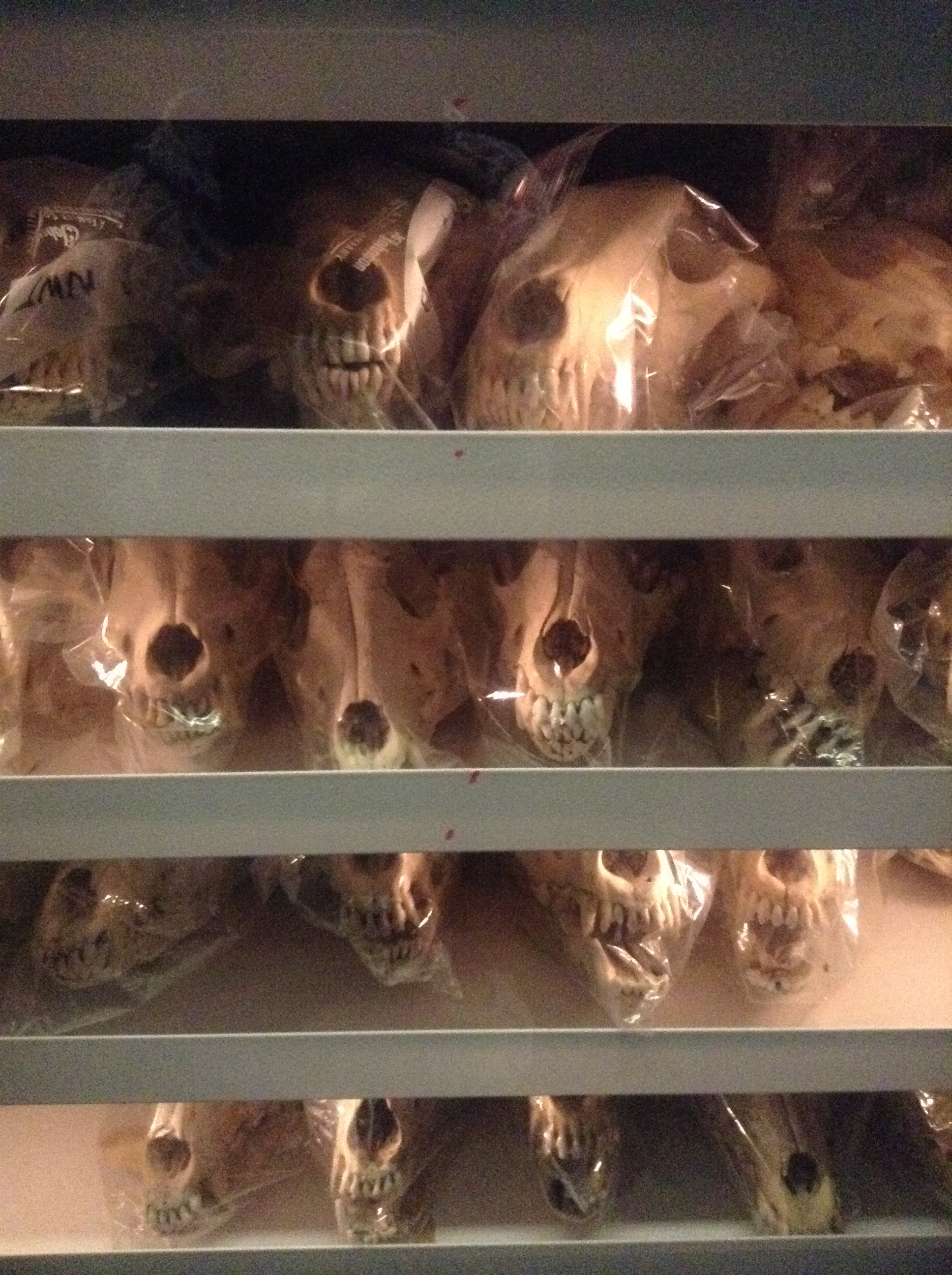
Examples of items in the Cowan Tetrapod collection

The Cowan Tetrapod Collection was founded in 1951. The collection is named after its first curator, Dr. Ian McTaggart-Cowan, and was originally named the "Cowan Vertebrate Museum". It combined several pre-existing collections, including the K. Racey birds and mammals collection, the WS Maguire and J. Wynne zoology materials, and the HR Macmillan birds collection.

The collection contains over 40,000 items representing over 2,000 species of vertebrates – 18,000 mammals from 540 species, 17,500 birds and 7,000 bird eggs, and 1,600 reptiles and amphibians – making it the second largest collection of birds, mammals, reptiles and amphibians in British Columbia.

The museum holds extensive, representative samples of nearly all species – and most subspecies – of British Columbia's terrestrial vertebrates and marine mammals. The collection includes older specimens dating back to 1849, as well as rare specimens such as the red panda, the endangered Vancouver Island marmot, and even extinct species such as the passenger pigeon.

Over 39,000 items from the Cowan Tetrapod Collection have been indexed in Vertnet, a "collaborative project funded by the National Science Foundation that aims to make biodiversity data free and openly accessible on the web from publishers worldwide".

=== Marine Invertebrate Collection ===
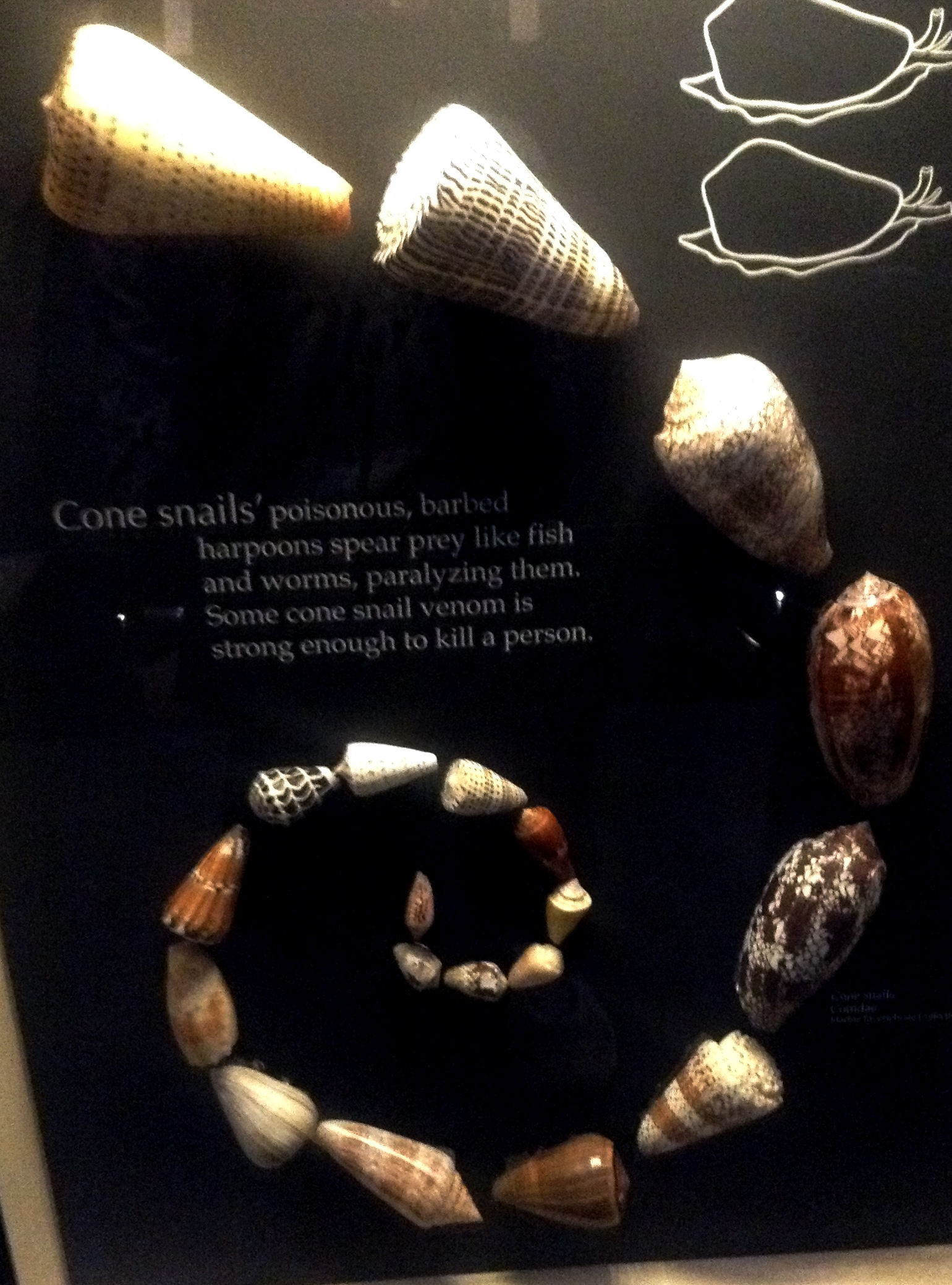
Shells in the Marine Invertebrate Collection

The Marine Invertebrate Collection was started in the 1930s with alcohol-preserved specimens collected by Dr. C. McLean Fraser and Dr. Ian McTaggart Cowan. The collection was primarily used for teaching purposes and eventually grew to several thousand specimens encompassing the major lineages of invertebrate animals. The collection was expanded in 2006, due to the donation of thousands of shells and corals by Kelly Norton. The collection was further expanded the following year with a large donation from Evelyn Hebb Killiam.

Items in the collection represent the "major lineages of animals" and include cnidarians, molluscs, annelids, echinoderms, crustaceans, and sponges. The collection has not yet been fully catalogued.

=== Herbarium ===
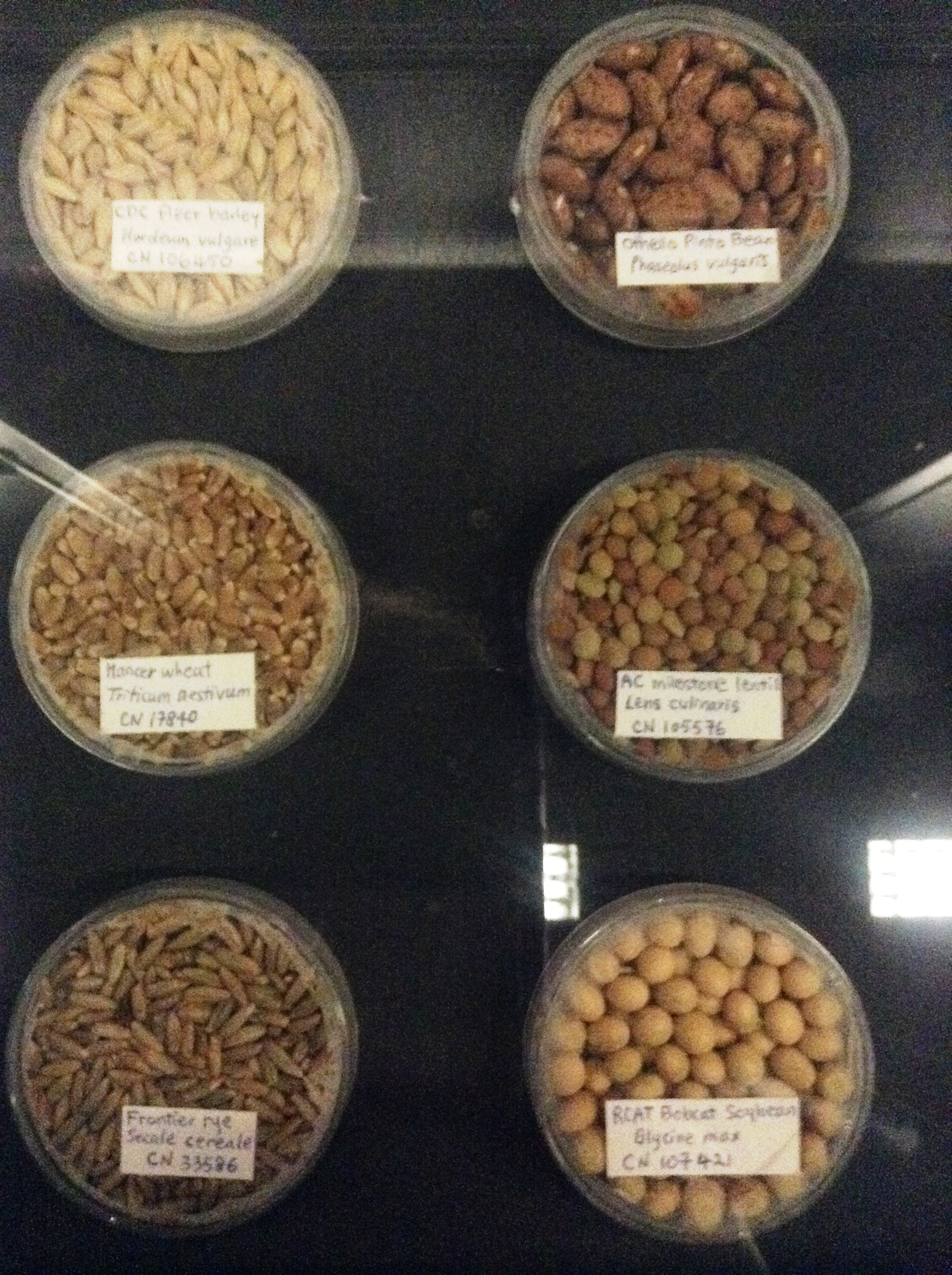
Examples from the Seed Collection

The Herbarium is among the oldest collections at UBC. It was established in 1912 by John Davidson, who was at that time the BC provincial botanist. His collection of mostly vascular plants was housed in downtown Vancouver at the Botanical Offices on West Pender Street. In 1925, it was relocated to the university campus. A seed collection arose independently via donations of large collections, particularly those of A.J. Hill, Eli Wilson, W. Taylor and A.E. Baggs. An algal collection also appeared prior to 1952, based on a donation by Mirian Armstead; although it was initially quite small, under the curatorship of Robert Scagel it expanded rapidly to a 67,000-item scope. The Bryological Collection was begun by V.J. Krajina in 1949; in 1960, Dr. W.B. Schofield became the "first bryologist to be hired by a Canadian university", and he curated and expanded the collection over several years. All of these disparate collections were consolidated into the Herbarium, then hosted by the university's biology department, in 1973, and the entire collection was ported into the Beaty Biodiversity Museum upon its completion.

The Herbarium contains more than 650,000 specimens, and it is the largest herbarium in Canada west of Ottawa. The specimens in the herbarium are used to help researchers identify the plants, describe new species, and track changes in diversity over time. The herbarium collection includes the land plants—conifers, ferns, mosses, flowering plants, and their relatives as well as algae, lichens and fungi. The collection comprises 223,000 vascular plants, 85,000 algae, 242,000 bryophytes, 16,000 fungi, and 40,000 lichens. Important strengths of the collection include the plants of British Columbia generally, "Pacific algae, fungi, Hawaiian plants, tropical prayer plants, and cyanolichens". Its algal collection is "the most comprehensive of any Herbarium", particularly in its coverage of the northeast Pacific Ocean species. Its bryophyte collection is the largest in Canada, while the fungi collection includes the "largest research collection of macrofungi of British Columbia" and the lichen collection is among the largest in western North America. The vascular plants collection is two-thirds Canadian (45% from British Columbia and 22% from other provinces and territories), 16% American (9% from Hawaii and the Pacific coast and 7% from the other states), and 17% from other countries.

Among the Herbarium's holdings are 498 type specimens.

=== Spencer Entomological Collection ===
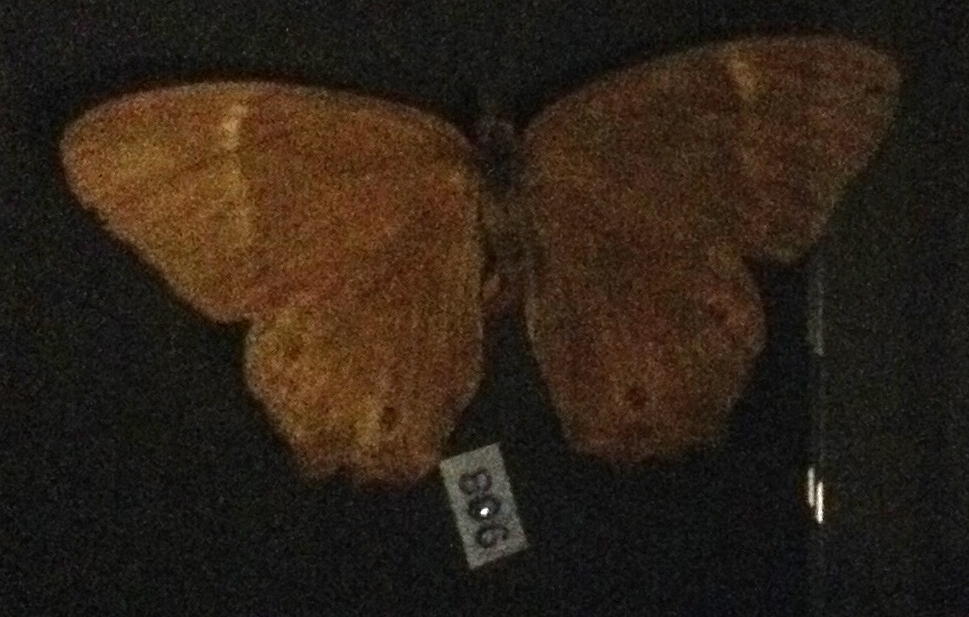
Insect specimen from 1910

The Spencer Entomological Collection was begun by Dr. George Spencer in the 1920s and includes specimens from as early as the 1830s. At the time of its creation it was not a university-recognized collection, but by the time of Spencer's retirement it comprised over 300,000 items. It was officially founded as a university collection in 1953 "as a retirement gift from his students and the Department of Zoology." Dr. G.G.E. Scudder assumed the curatorship of the collection in 1958, doubling the size of the collection in his 40 years in that role.

Now comprising over 600,000 items – over 500,000 pinned insects, 25,000 on slides, and 75,000 in alcohol – the Spencer Entomological Collection is the second-largest in Canada and focuses on the insects of British Columbia and Yukon. The collection has "particularly strong holdings of Hemiptera (true bugs), Odonata (dragonflies and damselflies), Siphonaptera (fleas) and Anoplura and Mallophaga (lice)." In addition to specimens, the collection also includes 350 books and other printed materials relevant to the study of entomology. A number of items in the collection have not yet been indexed.

=== Fish Collection ===
Dr. C. MacLean Fraser, the first head of UBC's Department of Zoology, donated her collections to the university in the 1940s. They were displayed in a UBC Fish Museum, which was first catalogued in 1945. The UBC Institute of Fisheries was founded in 1952, beginning a period of rapid collections expansion under the curatorship of M.A. Newman. In addition to amending the storage, preservation and recording of specimens, he also oversaw the addition of materials from "three expeditions to the eastern tropical Pacific at the invitation of H.R. MacMillan, the addition of extensive local freshwater material by members of the B.C. Game Commission, and several exchanges with institutions in other parts of the world". The collection was transferred to the biology department in 1960 and moved to the Beaty Biodiversity Museum along with the Herbarium.

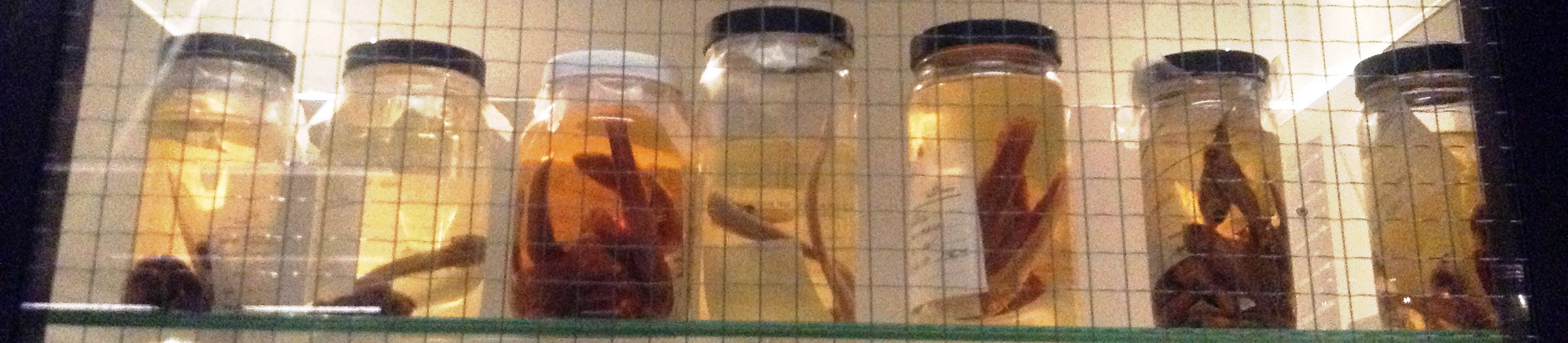
Part of the Fish Collection

The Fish Collection holds over 850,000 specimens, including whole fish stored in alcohol, skeletons, cleared and stained fish, and fish X-rays. It also has over 50,000 DNA and tissue samples. It is the third largest fish collection in Canada, with particular strengths in freshwater and nearshore marine species. Locations covered include Canada, the Aleutians, the Malay Archipelago, Mexico, the Galapagos Islands, Panama, and the Amazon River Basin.

The collection has been used in conservation efforts, environmental assessments, and numerous research projects, particularly by the Native Fishes Research Group. It has also served as an educational resource in training some of Canada's leading fish biologists.

Over 2,300 species from the Fish Collection are included in FishBase, a global fish relational database supported by a research consortium that includes the UBC Fisheries Centre. The museum's collection was the first to be indexed by FishBase.

=== Fossil Collection ===
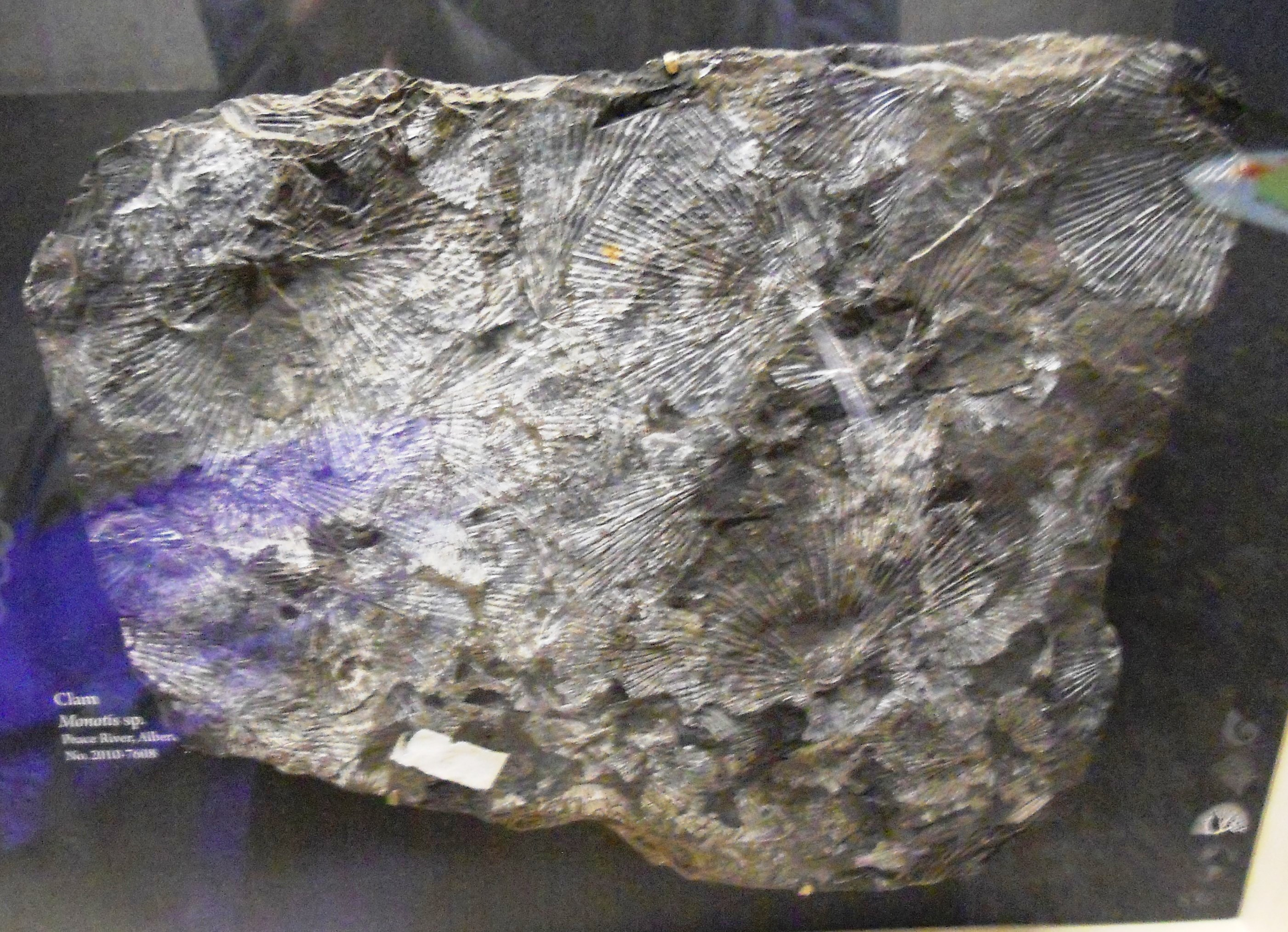
Clam fossils

Dr. Merton Yarwood Williams, co-founder of the UBC Geology Department, began the Fossil Collection in 1924 with an initial acquisition from mining engineer William John Sutton The collection was exhibited in the Geological Sciences Centre beginning in 1971 and was curated by Joe Nagel. However, due to financial constraints the exhibit was closed in 1995. The collection became part of the holdings of the Pacific Museum of the Earth in 2003, but is being housed in the Beaty Biodiversity Museum during its recataloguing process.

The Fossil Collection comprises over 20,000 items. Highlights of the collection include its stromatolites (rock formations consisting of blue-green algae dating back 500 million years – some of the oldest extant fossils) and examples of the Burgess Shale.

In 2018, the museum added 3 casts of dinosaur trackways from Peace Region area of British Columbia to its permanent exhibitions.

== Reception ==
The museum's blue whale exhibit was included in Scout Magazine's list of "1,000 Cool Things about Vancouver". The Globe and Mail called the whale "an inescapable presence" for museum visitors.

The museum was selected by Georgia Straight as among the "Best of Vancouver" for 2013; it was listed as "Best Collection of Weird Things in Drawers". The newspaper had previously featured the museum's blue whale exhibit.
