= List of Ontario students' associations =

This is a list of students' associations in Ontario, Canada:

== Universities ==
Institution	Undergraduate	Graduate
Algoma University	Algoma University Students' Union	
Brock University	Brock University Students' Union	Brock University Graduate Students' Association
Carleton University	Carleton University Students' Association	Carleton University Graduate Students' Association
Lakehead University	Lakehead University Student Union	
Laurentian University / Université Laurentienne	Students' General Association	Laurentian University Graduate Students' Association
Laurentian University / Université Laurentienne	Laurentian Students' Union	Laurentian University Graduate Students' Association
Laurentian University / Université Laurentienne	Association des étudiantes et étudiants francophones	Laurentian University Graduate Students' Association
Laurentian University / Université Laurentienne	Laurentian Association of Mature and Part-time Students	Laurentian University Graduate Students' Association
McMaster University	McMaster Students Union	McMaster Graduate Students' Association
Nipissing University	Nipissing University Student Union	
OCAD University	OCAD Student Union	
Ontario Tech University	Ontario Tech Student Union	
Queen's University	Alma Mater Society of Queen's University	Society of Graduate and Professional Students at Queen's University
Toronto Metropolitan University	Toronto Metropolitan Students' Union	Toronto Metropolitan Graduate Students' Union
Toronto Metropolitan University	Toronto Metropolitan Association of Part-time Students	Toronto Metropolitan Graduate Students' Union
Trent University	Trent Central Student Association	Trent University Graduate Students Association
Trent University	Trent Durham Student Association	Trent University Graduate Students Association
University of Guelph	Central Student Association	University of Guelph Graduate Students Association
University of Guelph-Humber	IGNITE	—N/a
University of Ottawa / Université d'Ottawa	University of Ottawa Students' Union	GSAÉD
University of Toronto	University of Toronto Students' Union	University of Toronto Graduate Students' Union
University of Toronto	University of Toronto Mississauga Students' Union	University of Toronto Graduate Students' Union
University of Toronto	Scarborough Campus Students' Union	University of Toronto Graduate Students' Union
University of Toronto	Association of Part-time Undergraduate Students at the University of Toronto	University of Toronto Graduate Students' Union
University of Waterloo	Waterloo Undergraduate Student Association	University of Waterloo Graduate Students Association
University of Western Ontario	University Students' Council	Western Society of Graduate Students
University of Windsor	University of Windsor Students' Alliance	University of Windsor Graduate Student Society
University of Windsor	University of Windsor Organization of Part-time Undergraduate Students	University of Windsor Graduate Student Society
Wilfrid Laurier University	Wilfrid Laurier University Students' Union	WLU Graduate Students' Association
York University / Université York	York Federation of Students	York University Graduate Students Association
York University / Université York	Glendon College Student Union—Association Étudiante du Collège Glendon	York University Graduate Students Association

In addition to university-wide student unions that represent all students, or all students based on enrolment status (undergraduate, graduate, or part-time), there are some universities with faculty-specific student societies. These include Arts and Science Students’ Union (ASSU) at the University of Toronto and Arts and Science Undergraduate Society (ASUS) at Queen's University.

=== Federated Universities and Colleges ===
Federated universities and colleges are affiliated with larger institutions, but maintain their own autonomy and are governed as separate universities by their own provincial Acts.

Federated university student unions include:

- Laurentian University / Université Laurentienne:
  - Université de Hearst—Association des étudiantes et étudiants de l’Université de Hearst
- University of Ottawa / Université d'Ottawa:
  - Saint Paul University / Université Saint-Paul—Saint Paul University Student Association
- University of Toronto:
  - University of St. Michael's College—St. Michael's College Student Union
  - Trinity College—Trinity College Meeting
  - Victoria University—Victoria University Students’ Administrative Council
- University of Waterloo:
  - St. Jerome's University—Students' Union of St. Jerome's University
- University of Western Ontario:
  - Huron University College—Huron Students' Council
  - King's University College - King's University College Students' Council

=== Ontario Undergraduate Student Alliance (OUSA) ===
The undergraduate students' associations of Brock University, Laurentian University, McMaster University, Queen’s University, Trent University Durham Campus, the University of Waterloo, Wilfrid Laurier University, University of Western Ontario, and the University of Ontario Institute of Technology make up the Ontario Undergraduate Student Alliance.

=== Canadian Federation of Students–Ontario (CFS-Ontario) ===
The Canadian Federation of Students—Ontario represents 35 student unions in Ontario including college and graduate student associations.

== University Faculty Student Societies ==
Ontario Faculty-level Student Societies
Institution	Faculty	Student Society Name
Brock University	Goodman Business	Goodman Business Students' Association
Brock University	Education	Concurrent Education Student Association
McMaster University	DeGroote Business	DeGroote Commerce Society
McMaster University	Engineering	McMaster Engineering Society
McMaster University	Humanities	McMaster Humanities Society
McMaster University	Science	McMaster Science Society
McMaster University	Social Sciences	McMaster Social Sciences Society
McMaster University	Health Sciences	Bachelor of Health Sciences Society
McMaster University	Health Sciences	McMaster Undergraduate Nursing Students' Society
Ontario Tech University	Business and Information Tech	Ontario Tech Business and Information Tech Society
Ontario Tech University	Engineering and Applied Science	Ontario Tech Engineering Students' Society
Ontario Tech University	Health Sciences	Ontario Tech Health Sciences Society
Ontario Tech University	Science	Ontario Tech Science Council
Ontario Tech University	Social Sciences and Humanities	Ontario Tech Humanities Society
Queen's University	Arts and Science	Arts and Science Undergraduate Society
Queen's University	Education	Concurrent Education Students' Association
Queen's University	Smith Engineering	Engineering Society of Queens's University
Queen's University	Health Sciences and Nursing	Health Sciences Society
Queen's University	Health Sciences and Nursing	Queen's Nursing Science Society
Queen's University	Smith Business	Smith Commerce Society
Toronto Metropolitan University	Ted Rogers School of Management	Ted Rogers Students' Society
Toronto Metropolitan University	Community Services	Faculty of Community Services Society
Toronto Metropolitan University	Creative School	Society of the Creative Society
Toronto Metropolitan University	Arts	Society of Arts, Social Sciences, and Humanities
Toronto Metropolitan University	Science	Undergraduate Science Society of Toronto Met
Toronto Metropolitan University	Engineering and Architectural Science	Metropolitan Undergraduate Engineering Society
Toronto Metropolitan University	Engineering and Architectural Science	Architectural Science Students' Society
Toronto Metropolitan University	Law	Lincoln Alexander Law Students' Society
Trent University	Catharine Parr Traill	Traill College Cabinet
Trent University	Champlain	Champlain College Cabinet
Trent University	Lady Eaton	Lady Eaton Cabinet
Trent University	Otonabee	Otonabee College Cabinet
Trent University	Peter Gzowski	Gzowski Cabinet
University of Guelph	Arts	College of Arts Students' Union
University of Guelph	Biological Sciences	College of Biological Sciences Student Council
University of Guelph	Gordan S. Lang Business	College of Business and Economics Association
University of Guelph	Computing, Mathematics, & Physical Sciences	College of Engineering & Physical Sciences Student Council
University of Guelph	Engineering	Guelph Engineering Society
University of Guelph	Social and Applied Human Sciences	College of Social and Applied Human Science Student Alliance
University of Guelph-Humber	Business	Guelph-Humber Business Council
University of Guelph-Humber	Community Social Services	Community Social Services Society
University of Guelph-Humber	Early Childhood Studies	Early Childhood Studies Society
University of Guelph-Humber	Justice Studies	Justice Society
University of Guelph-Humber	Kinesiology	Kinesiology Society
University of Guelph-Humber	Media and Communication Studies	Media Society
University of Guelph-Humber	Psychology	Psychology Society
University of Ottawa	Arts	Students' Association of the Faculty of Arts
University of Ottawa	Engineering	uOttawa Engineering Students' Society
University of Ottawa	Health Sciences	Health Sciences Students' Association
University of Ottawa	Medicine	The Aesculapian Society
University of Ottawa	Science	Science Students' Association
University of Ottawa	Telfer School of Management	Telfer Student Association
University of Toronto	Engineering	University of Toronto Engineering Society
University of Toronto	University College	University College Literary and Athletic Society* Oldest Student Society in Canada
University of Toronto	Victoria	Victoria University Students' Administrative Council
University of Toronto	Trinity	Trinity College Meeting
University of Toronto	New College	New College Student Council
University of Toronto	Innis	Innis College Student Society
University of Toronto	St. Michael's	St. Michael's College Students' Union
University of Toronto	Woodsworth	Woodsworth College Students' Association
University of Waterloo	Arts	Arts Student Union
University of Waterloo	Engineering	Waterloo Engineering Society
University of Waterloo	Environment	Environment Students' Society
University of Waterloo	Health	Association of Health Students Undergraduate Members
University of Waterloo	Mathematics	Waterloo Mathematics Society
University of Waterloo	Science	Waterloo Science Society
University of Western Ontario	Arts and Humanities	Arts & Humanities Students' Council
University of Western Ontario	Music	Faculty of Music Students' Council
University of Western Ontario	Engineering	Undergraduate Engineering Society
University of Western Ontario	Health Sciences	Faculty of Health Sciences Students' Council
University of Western Ontario	Law	Student Legal Society
University of Western Ontario	Social Science	Social Science Students' Council
University of Windsor	Arts, Humanities and Social Sciences	Society of Arts, Humanities, and Social Sciences
University of Windsor	Education	Education Society
University of Windsor	Engineering	Engineering Society
University of Windsor	Human Kinetics	Human Kinetics Society
University of Windsor	Law	Students' Law Society
University of Windsor	Nursing	Nursing Society
University of Windsor	Odette Business	Odette Commerce Society
University of Windsor	Science	Faculty of Science Society
Wilfrid Laurier University	Lazaridis Business	Lazaridis Students' Society
Wilfrid Laurier University	Arts	Arts Undergraduate Society
Wilfrid Laurier University	Education	Education Student Society
Wilfrid Laurier University	Human and Social Sciences	Human and Social Sciences Association
Wilfrid Laurier University	Music	Faculty of Music Students' Association
Wilfrid Laurier University	Science	Faculty of Science Students' Association
Wilfrid Laurier University	Social Work	Bachelor of Social Work Students' Association
Wilfrid Laurier University	Liberal Arts	Faculty of Liberal Arts Student Society
York University	McLaughlin	McLaughlin College Student Council
York University	Bethune	Bethune College Council
York University	Calumet	Calumet College Council
York University	Stong	Stong College Student Government
York University	Founders	Founders Council
York University	New	New College Council
York University	Vanier	Vanier College Student Council
York University	Winters	Winters College Council
York University	Lassonde School of Engineering	Lassonde Student Congress
York University	Lassonde School of Engineering	Lassonde Engineering Society

=== University Faculty Student Societies History ===
Faculty Student Societies are the oldest form of student governance within Canada, with the University of Toronto, UCLIT being the first democratically elected student government society founded in 1854 on February 22. Faculty Student Societies are the beating heart of student life within each university faculty, acting as the umbrella organization. Key characteristics that make faculty-student societies different than student unions are that student societies solely focus on student life, mental well-being, professional development, and fellowship among a given faculty/college and do not tinker so much with the administrative academics side. Faculty Student Societies always have a membership fee/levy students pay through tuition. Student Societies give the most collegiate traditional experiences to their collective memberships by having a mascot costume, providing frosh weeks, graduation galas, formals, frost weeks, funding, and student-facing services. Other aspects some student societies have are houses under the umbrella that help students identify more closely with each other, similar to Harry Potter's four houses (Gryffindor, Slytherin, Hufflepuff, and Ravenclaw).

== Colleges ==
Institution	Association name
Algonquin College	Algonquin Students' Association
Cambrian College	Cambrian Students' Administrative Council
Canadore College	Canadore Students' Representative Council
Centennial College	Centennial College Student Association
Conestoga College	Conestoga Students
Confederation College	Student Union of Confederation College
Collège Boréal	Association générale des étudiantes et étudiants
Durham College	Durham College Student Association
Fanshawe College	Fanshawe Student Union
Fleming College	Fleming College Student Administrative Council
Fleming College	Frost Student Association
George Brown College	Student Association of George Brown College
Georgian College	Georgian College Student Association—Barrie
Georgian College	Georgian College Student Association—Orillia
Georgian College	Georgian College Student Association—Owen Sound
Humber College	IGNITE
La Cité collégiale	Association étudiante de La Cité collegiale
Lambton College	Lambton College Student Administrative Council
Loyalist College	Loyalist College Student Government
Mohawk College	Mohawk Students Association
Niagara College	Niagara College Students' Administration Council
Northern College	Northern College Students Association—Kirkland Lake
Northern College	Northern College Students Association—Haileybury
Northern College	Northern College Students Association—Timmins
St. Clair College	St. Clair Students Representative Council
St. Clair College	St. Clair Thames Students Inc.
St. Lawrence College	Brockville Student Administrative Council
St. Lawrence College	Cornwall Students' Union
St. Lawrence College	SLC Student Association—Kingston
Sault College	Sault College Students' Union
Seneca College	Seneca Student Federation
Sheridan College	Sheridan Student Union

=== College Student Alliance (CSA) ===
The student associations of Humber, Fleming (Sutherland campus), Sault, St. Lawrence (Brockville campus) colleges make up the College Student Alliance.

=== Ontario Student Voices (OSV) ===
The student associations of Conestoga, Confederation, Niagara, Fleming (Frost & Haliburton campus), Sheridan colleges are members of Ontario Student Voices. The student associations of Fanshawe, Seneca, Loyalist, and Centennial colleges are observers.

== Secondary schools ==
Institution Region	Association name
Province Wide	Ontario Secondary School Students' Association
Province Wide	Ontario Student Trustees' Association
Toronto	Toronto Youth Cabinet
Ottawa	Rideau Students' Union

== See also ==
- Canadian Alliance of Student Associations
- Canadian Federation of Students
- Ontario Undergraduate Student Alliance
- College Student Alliance
- List of Canadian students' associations
