= Busu =

Busu may refer to:

- Busu, Indonesia, a village on Halmahera, Indonesia
- Busu languages
- Busu, a village in Grecești Commune, Dolj County, Romania
- Brock University Students' Union
- Busu Dima, a festival of the Dimasa Kachari tribe of India
