= Alma Mater Society of Queen's University =

University student organization

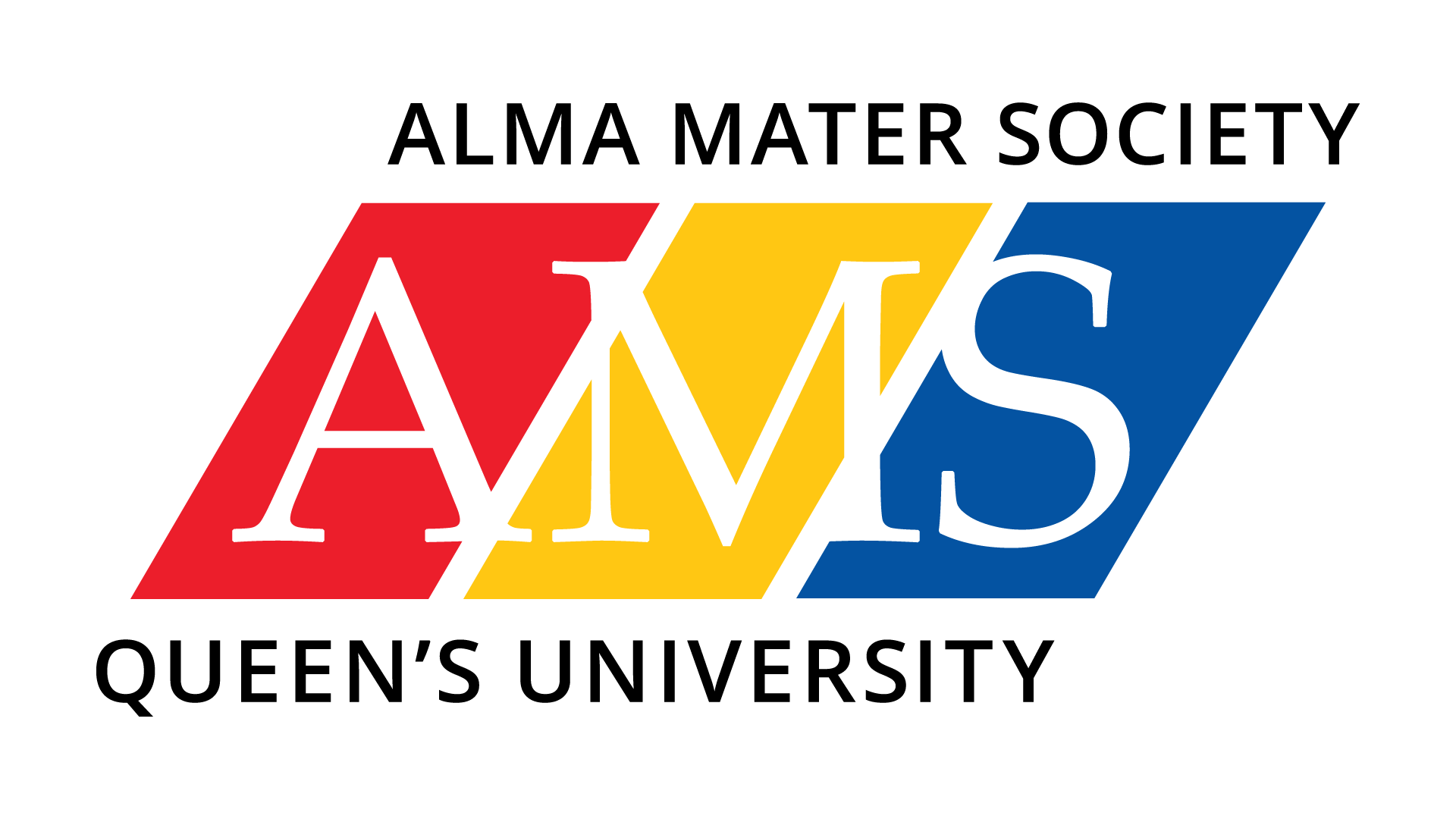
- Abbreviation: AMS
- Formation: 1858
- Type: Non-profit student government
- Purpose: Student representation, advocacy, and services
- Headquarters: John Deutsch University Centre
- Location: Kingston, Ontario, Canada
- Members: ~20,000
- President: Dreyden George
- Vice-President (Operations): Avery Papoulidis
- Vice-President (University Affairs): Edward Sy
- Board of directors: Siena Marshal; (Chair); Areeb Shekhani; (Vice-Chair)
- Affiliations: Queen's University at Kingston; Ontario Undergraduate Student Alliance (OUSA)
- Budget: ~$20 million
- Staff: 870+
- Volunteers: 1,000+
- Website: www.myams.org
- Formerly called: Dialectic Society

The Alma Mater Society of Queen's University, otherwise known as the AMS, is the central undergraduate student association at Queen's University at Kingston in Kingston, Ontario, Canada. Founded in 1858, it is the oldest student government in Canada. Its roots lie in the old Dialectic Society (now known as the Queen's Debating Union), which created the AMS in 1858.

The AMS operates as both a student government and a non-profit corporation, with an annual operations budget of roughly $20 million. It employs over 500 students and engages more than 1,500 volunteers each year, and works with member faculty societies to provide services, advocacy, and programming to undergraduates. The organization operates a diverse portfolio of student-run businesses, including cafes, a campus pub, a student newspaper and support services, making it one of the largest and most complex student-run organizations in North America.

== Structure and organization ==
The AMS is structured as two entities operating under a single umbrella: a student society (which handles governance, advocacy, and policy) and a non-profit corporation (which manages finances, services, and employment). The AMS Assembly governs the society, while the board of directors oversees the corporation. This dual structure separates political decision-making from business operations.

=== Assembly and board of directors ===
==== AMS Assembly (the aociety) ====
Assembly is the ultimate decision-making body for the Society, acting in the best interest of the student body by debating policy and political affairs. It is composed of elected representatives from each member faculty society: Arts and Science, Engineering and Applied Science (now the Stephen J.R. Smith Faculty of Engineering and Applied Science), Concurrent Education, Commerce (Smith School of Business), Nursing, Medicine, Physical and Health Education, Computing, and the Health Sciences Society, as well as non-voting representatives of the Residence Society. Ex-officio members include the AMS Commissioners, the University Rector, Undergraduate Trustee, Board of Directors Chair, and the AMS Secretariat.

==== Board of directors (the corporation) ====
The board plays a strategic, fiduciary, and human resources role in the corporate side of the AMS. Assembly representatives serve as voting members of the corporation and annually elect a board of directors that oversees services and financial affairs, including an operations budget of approximately $20 million. The Board is composed of six student directors, three community directors (external professionals and alumni), and three members of the AMS Executive. In addition to these twelve voting members, the AMS General Manager, Secretariat, and any delegated Board Scribe attend meetings in a non-voting capacity. The Board holds internal yearly elections for the chair and Vice-Chair, and has six standing committees, each chaired by a student director.

=== Executive ===
The three-person AMS Executive oversees the student society's general operations and representation. Elected annually in January, the executive consists of the AMS president, the vice-president (operations), and the vice-president (university affairs). Responsibilities are divided along the corporate and government sides of the AMS. The executive serves a one-year term from May 1 to April 30, meaning the organization receives entirely new senior leadership every twelve months. This annual turnover is offset by permanent staff.

The day-to-day operations are overseen by the AMS Executive Team (formerly known as the "AMS Council"). In the organization's structure, commissions and directors under the Vice-President (University Affairs) and president operate the Society, while officers and senior management under the Vice-President (Operations) and President run the Corporation (AMS Inc.).

==== Presidential portfolio ====
The president is responsible for representing the society, liaising with the university administration, and managing internal and communications functions. Offices reporting to the president include:

- Communications
- Human Resources
- Information Technology
- Internal Affairs
- Marketing

The president also oversees the Orientation Roundtable (which plans Orientation Week) and the Student Life Centre (which manages AMS spaces including the JDUC and Queen's Centre).

==== Vice-president (university affairs) portfolio ====
Overseeing the "government side" of the AMS Society, the vice-president (university affairs) manages the commissioners. The Commissions are responsible for the organization and oversight of student programs, advocacy, external representation, and social causes. The active commissions include:

- Campus Affairs
- Clubs
  - Supports over 275 ratified clubs, providing grants, marketing, and budgeting advice.
- Environmental Sustainability
- External Affairs
  - Lobbies at the municipal and provincial levels, providing housing resources and advocating on behalf of students in the University District.
- Social Issues
  - Divided into the Internal Commissioner and the External Commissioner.

==== Vice-president (operations) portfolio ====
The vice-president (operations) is responsible for all day-to-day operational and financial matters of the society, acting functionally as its chief executive officer (CEO). They directly supervise all head managers on the corporate side, managing a multimillion-dollar portfolio of student-run businesses, retail venues, and campus welfare services that jointly employ hundreds of undergraduates. The vice-president (operations) also chairs the Student Activity Fee Review Committee, administers the AMS Health and Dental Plan and the Bus-It program, and presents the consolidated operating budget annually to the board of directors and Assembly.

The services and businesses operating under this portfolio include:

- Common Ground Coffeehouse (CoGro)
  - The Brew (sister cafe located in the JDUC)
- Queen's Pub Restaurant and Bar
- Queen's Student Constables (StuCons)
- Walkhome
- Society 58
- Peer Support Centre
- AMS Foodbank
- AMS Media Centre
- PEACH Market

=== Permanent Staff ===
Due to the yearly turnover of the executive and senior management, permanent staff members are employed to ensure the longevity, compliance, and institutional memory of the corporation and society. The permanent staff positions include (but are not limited to):

- General Manager
- Financial Controller
- Payroll Administration
- Facilities Officer
- Human Resources Officer
- Information Officer
- Operations Officer

== Student services and facilities ==
The AMS runs a number of student operated services and businesses that employ hundreds of undergraduates and bring in millions in revenue each year. These services are a central part of daily student life at Queen's and are run almost entirely by students, which is uncommon at Canadian universities.

=== Common Ground Coffeehouse ===
Common Ground Coffeehouse (CoGro) is a student-run cafe owned and operated by the AMS. It opened in 2000, the vision of President Paul Heisler, VP Operations Bart Bonakowski, and VP University Affairs Janine Cocker, who pushed the project forward despite skepticism from university administration that student politicians could successfully establish and maintain such a service. Originally located in the JDUC (taking over the former university-run "Skylight Dining Room"), CoGro relocated to the Athletics and Recreation Centre (ARC) in 2010. In September 2025, the AMS opened a sister cafe named The Brew in the newly revitalized JDUC. CoGro employs over 100 students annually and, beyond serving coffee, functions as a campus hub for live music, open mic nights, debates, and talent shows.

=== Queen's Pub Restaurant and Bar ===
Queen's Pub Restaurant and Bar traces its origins to October 1969, when the AMS opened its first campus pub on the second floor of the then-Students' Union Building (now the JDUC), in two rooms known as the House of Commons and the House of Lords (later renamed the McLaughlin Room and the Robert Sutherland Room). During the mid-1970s expansion of the building, a new, larger pub was created in the basement and opened in 1976 following a campus-wide naming contest as The Underground, becoming the largest gathering space on campus and known for live entertainment, low prices, and long lineups.

In 1979, the AMS voted to rename The Underground Alfie's Pub, in honour of Alfie Pierce (1874–1951), a long-time supporter and fixture of Queen's athletics widely seen as embodying the "Queen's spirit." Alfie's remained a central hub for student life for decades, undergoing major renovations in 2001 and 2004. In 2004–05, the separate pub locations were amalgamated under a single management structure known as The AMS Pub Services (TAPS).

In 2013, following campus discussions about the complex and problematic history of Alfie Pierce's treatment as a "mascot" during his lifetime, the AMS voted to revert the name of the basement bar back to The Underground. Both the Queen's Pub and The Underground were closed in 2020 at the onset of the COVID-19 pandemic and remained so throughout the multi-year JDUC revitalization. Following the building's reopening, the service returned in June 2025 as the Queen's Pub Restaurant and Bar, now located on the ground floor with a patio overlooking University Avenue. The new venue has shifted away from the nightclub model of its predecessor, focusing instead on a full restaurant and bar experience competitive with downtown Kingston establishments while remaining entirely student-run.

=== Queen's Student Constables ===
The Queen's Student Constables (commonly known as StuCons) are a peer-to-peer student security service embodying the principle of "students responsible for students." Records show students policing Queen's football games as early as 1895, and by 1940 it was standard practice for the AMS to provide constables for all student dances, at which point the service was formally established. From their inception, StuCons evolved from ornamental proctors enforcing "gentlemanly deportment" into a real student security force responsible for maintaining order and preventing damage at student events. In 1988, the StuCons played a foundational role in establishing Canada's first student walk-home service (see Walkhome below), and in 1991 hired their first female Chief Constable.

=== Walkhome ===
Walkhome was launched during Orientation Week of 1988 as an initiative of the AMS in response to student concerns about walking home alone after dark. The service was originally staffed by Queen's Student Constable volunteers, always including one male and one female to ensure the student felt comfortable. It provides discreet, anonymous, and confidential accompaniment walks across campus and the surrounding Kingston area, and is considered one of the first services of its kind in Canada.

== The Queen's Journal ==
The Queen's Journal is the editorially autonomous student-run newspaper at Queen's University, founded in 1873. It is one of the oldest student newspapers in Canada and is as old as The Harvard Crimson, the oldest continuously published student newspaper in the United States. The paper's editorial independence is guaranteed by the AMS constitution and by-laws.

The Journal has been a starting point for many of Canada's most prominent journalists and public figures. Charlotte Whitton became its first female Editor-in-Chief in 1917 and later became the first woman elected mayor of a major Canadian city (Ottawa). Novelist Robertson Davies wrote a literary column and served as its literary editor in the 1930s; his experiences in Kingston influenced his Salterton trilogy. Other notable alumni include Ali Velshi (MSNBC), who credits the Journal with his development as a journalist; Jeffrey Simpson, former political columnist for The Globe and Mail; Jeffrey Kofman, former ABC News correspondent; former Toronto Star editor-in-chief Giles Gherson; and former Globe and Mail editor-in-chief John Stackhouse.

Journal photographers have captured several iconic moments in Canadian culture, including Paul Faulkner's 1985 rain-coat photoshoot of The Tragically Hip in Victoria Park before their widespread fame, Dave Kemp's 1995 coverage of Mordecai Richler speaking on the Quebec referendum, and front-page photographs of King Charles and Princess Diana during their 1991 royal visit.

== Student Life Centre ==
The Student Life Centre (SLC) is the AMS division responsible for managing bookable student spaces across campus, primarily the John Deutsch University Centre (JDUC) and the Queen's Centre. Operating under the president's portfolio, the SLC is led by a student managing director and a management team composed entirely of students, supported where necessary by the AMS's permanent staff infrastructure.

The SLC operates under a shared governance constitution with the AMS, the Society of Graduate and Professional Students (SGPS), and Queen's University, with an SLC Council of representatives overseeing the centre. Beyond booking logistics, the SLC collaborates with AMS services, student clubs, university departments, and external community partners to support events, programming, and student-led initiatives year-round.

A key milestone in the SLC's development came during the 2010–11 presidency of Safiah Chowdhury, when the AMS successfully negotiated the transfer of operational control of the SLC from the university administration to student government — a landmark in student autonomy at Queen's.

The SLC logged over 40,000 space bookings between 2016 and 2025, exceeded 8,000 bookings in the 2024–25 academic year alone, its most successful year on record, and anticipates further growth following the full reopening of the JDUC in 2025.

=== Queen's Centre and JDUC revitalization ===
In 2005, the university proposed the multi-phase "Queen's Centre" project to overhaul student spaces. The AMS committed $25.5 million over 15 years, the largest financial contribution by a student group in Canadian history. Only Phase 1 (the Athletics and Recreation Centre, completed 2009) was finished; subsequent phases were cancelled due to the 2008 financial crisis, leaving the aging JDUC in limbo for over a decade.

Efforts to revitalize the building picked up again in the mid-2010s. A $1.2-million interim refurbishment was completed in 2016 using leftover Queen's Centre funds. Architects MJMA and HDR were selected, and although a 2018 undergraduate referendum on funding failed, the university moved forward with a combination of capital reserves, donor funds, and student levies. Construction began in 2022, requiring the temporary relocation of student clubs and AMS offices — a process in which AMS President Zaid Kasim played a key coordinating role. The residence portion opened in August 2024, the historic section in early 2025, and the fully renovated JDUC was officially reopened to the public on May 5, 2025.

== Orientation ==
The AMS oversees undergraduate orientation through its Orientation Roundtable (ORT), a commission that coordinates the nine faculty and school orientation programs. The ORT works alongside the university's Student Experience Office, faculty deans, and external partners including the Kingston Police to ensure that Orientation Week is safe, accessible, and inclusive.

Orientation at Queen's has changed significantly over the decades. In the early 20th century, activities centred on physical "rushes" and hazing rituals between first-year and upper-year students. In 1928, the AMS formally wrote "acceptable hazing" into its constitution.

The turning point came in 1991 with the Jackson Report, published by an ad-hoc Senate committee in response to growing controversy over hazing, alcohol consumption, and vulgar slogans painted on frosh coveralls. The report recommended ending AMS-sponsored alcoholic events and house crawls, removing sexually suggestive slogans, increasing oversight by faculty deans, and establishing the Senate Orientation Activities Review Board (SOARB) to approve all orientation activities at the Senate level. Today, Orientation Week focuses on community building, inclusivity, and helping new students adjust to university life.

== History ==
=== Origins and Early Years (1858–1890s) ===
Founded in 1858 at Queen's University, the Alma Mater Society is Canada's oldest student government. The original goals of the AMS were social, academic, and political: to promote "the maintenance and defence of students' rights, the interchange of friendly intercourse, the promotion and encouragement of learning, and the furtherance of the general interests of the University." It was formed as an offshoot of the old Dialectic Society (a debating association founded in 1843), and officially remained a debating society until late in the century.

In 1873, the AMS founded The Queen's Journal, one of the oldest student newspapers in Canada. In the 1880s, the AMS took the lead in styling the Queen's visual identity, working with sports captains to establish that the university's colours would be blue, gold, and red (the "tricolour"). Gradually, the AMS assumed more responsibility for student affairs, including non-academic discipline, which was officially delegated to the AMS by the University Senate in 1898. In the same year, the AMS overhauled its constitution and adopted its modern role of representing student views and coordinating student societies.

The AMS also incubated a student-funded clubs system, whereby fees were voted by students to support groups ranging from sports to politics. Annual referendums allowed students to decide what fees they were prepared to pay to sustain campus life.

=== Campus Infrastructure and Expansion (1900s–1960s) ===
When Principal George Grant died in 1902, the AMS rallied students to donate an astonishing $30,000 to support the construction of Grant Hall. The AMS eventually established its headquarters in the John Deutsch University Centre (JDUC), originally built in 1862 as an orphanage, which Queen's purchased in 1927 as the Students' Memorial Union.

In 1941, the AMS elected Dorothy Wardle as its first woman president. By 1969, the AMS opened its first campus pub (the Queen's Pub), laying the groundwork for popular later venues including The Underground and Alfie's. Entering the 1970s under President Ross McGregor, the AMS successfully advocated for the liberalization of strict gender divisions at campus residences, leading to open visitation.

The AMS was formally incorporated in 1969 as a non-profit organization without share capital.

=== Advocacy, Equity, and Leadership ===
Political and social advocacy became a major part of the AMS through the late 20th century. In the late 1960s, Chuck Edwards became the first AMS president in modern Queen's history to be directly elected by the student body; previously, the president had been chosen by AMS representatives from each faculty. Edwards engaged deeply with student radicalism. He supported striking Kingston workers, organized a "tent-in" on the principal's lawn to protest a housing crisis, and pushed the AMS to provide buses to Vietnam war protests before resigning over internal resistance. His successor, Ross McGregor, pursued similar goals through less provocative means, including the first student pub and the formal incorporation of the AMS.

In 1989, following misogynist vandalism in response to an AMS "No Means No" campaign (weeks before the Montreal Massacre), President Emily Moore fiercely defended the student non-academic discipline system against a lawyer hired by the parents of offending students, and actively increased the hiring of students of colour in senior salaried positions. The Society continued to diversify its leadership when it elected Taslim Pirmohamed Tagore, its first minority woman president, in 1994. Furthering this, Gregory Frankson was elected as the first Black AMS President in 1996; he chaired the Robert Sutherland Task Force, which led to the commemoration of Canada's first Black university graduate with the Robert Sutherland Room in the JDUC (1998) and eventually the rededication of Robert Sutherland Hall (2009).

These efforts carried into the 21st century. President Safiah Chowdhury (2010–11) faced weekly misogynist and Islamophobic attacks during her term, but successfully advanced anti-racism and equity measures alongside university administration, including the landmark transfer of operational control of the new Student Life Centre from the university to student government.

=== Cultural Impact ===
Through its student organizations, the AMS has documented and influenced broader Canadian culture. Photographers at The Queen's Journal captured several iconic moments, including Paul Faulkner's 1985 rain-coat photoshoot of The Tragically Hip in Victoria Park before their widespread fame, Dave Kemp's 1995 coverage of Mordecai Richler speaking on the Quebec referendum, and front-page photographs of King Charles and Princess Diana during their 1991 royal visit to the campus.

=== Secessions and Restructuring ===
At its inception, the AMS represented all students attending Queen's University. That changed in 1981 when the Graduate Students' Society (GSS), an AMS member society formed in 1962, voted by referendum to secede from the AMS. This secession developed out of conflicts around graduate student representation, student services, and policy positions. In the 1990s, the AMS saw the Theological Society and the Law Students' Society also leave (the latter over a dispute regarding student constables) to join the GSS. Through an amendment to its constitution and by-laws, the GSS was renamed the Queen's University Society of Graduate and Professional Students (SGPS).

In January 2009, the Education Students Society (ESS) voted to leave the AMS, primarily over a debate regarding fees. In 2023, Master of Business Administration (MBA) students similarly voted via referendum to transition to the SGPS, with representatives arguing that older professional students aligned better with graduate needs than the undergraduate-focused AMS.

== Fraternity and Sorority Ban ==
The AMS has banned its members from joining externally-affiliated fraternities and sororities since 1933, making Queen's one of the few major Canadian universities to maintain such a policy. The ban has its origins in the 1920s, when two fraternities were established at Queen's: one for Arts and Science students and another for medical students. Many in the Queen's community, which prided itself on egalitarianism, grew concerned that these organizations fostered exclusivity and divided loyalties.

In 1933, a coalition of anti-fraternity forces, led by the Levana Society (a prominent women's organization) and students from Arts and Theology, swept the AMS elections and sponsored a mass meeting of approximately 1,000 students in Grant Hall, where the student body voted to formally ban all fraternities and sororities from campus.

Despite the ban, 24 medical students who had formed Psi Delta Phi (seeking affiliation with the American Nu Sigma Nu) refused to comply. In 1934, they were brought before the AMS Court, the student government's judicial body, for "contravention of the AMS Constitution." Over 800 students attended the highly public trial, which followed natural justice guidelines with students acting as both prosecutors and defence. The 24 members were found guilty and suspended from all student political, social, and athletic activities for one year, effectively ending the fraternity movement at Queen's.

The ban was reaffirmed by AMS Assembly in 2013, a decision subsequently backed by the University Senate. While fraternities do exist in the Kingston area, the policy prevents them from recruiting on-campus or affiliating with the University.

== Kingston and Community Relations ==
Relations between the student society, the City of Kingston, and its residents, often described as "town and gown" relations, have been a recurring theme throughout AMS history.

In 1953, following a "freshman riot," the AMS adopted a progressive policy of assessing damages to the organizing student bodies rather than the whole student population. In the late 1950s, the AMS intervened when a freshman commandeered an OPP cruiser, and during Stewart Goodings' tenure in the early 1960s, the Society negotiated with CN Rail after students damaged railway cars en route to a football game in Toronto. In the 1980s, President John Lougheed worked with the Mayor and Chief of Police to prevent mass evictions after a 1,000-person street party.

In the modern era, the AMS participates in the University District Safety Initiative (UDSI), a formal partnership between the City of Kingston, Kingston Police, and Queen's University designed to manage large street parties during Orientation Week, Homecoming, and St. Patrick's Day. The AMS External Affairs Commissioner advocates year-round at the municipal level on issues including housing affordability (Kingston has one of Canada's most expensive rental markets) and student representation in municipal politics. The AMS also operates a Housing Resource Centre to assist students with landlord-tenant disputes and lease reviews.

== Recent Controversies ==
The AMS has faced several internal controversies over the years, regularly reported on by The Queen's Journal.

=== 2026 — Presidential Credit Card Scandal and Resignation ===
In January 2026, The Queen's Journal published a report revealing that the AMS board of directors had revoked the credit card of AMS president Jana Amer and set her spending limit to zero following a review of her expenses. The review identified $1,762.61 in transactions made between May and October 2025 that lacked receipts, of which $640.70 could not be substantiated; $377.32 of that amount was confirmed as personal expenses. Amer repaid the $640.70 in full.

The incident prompted student-led petitions calling for the resignation of the president and the entire executive team. On February 27, 2026, Faculty Society presidents jointly introduced a formal motion of impeachment against Amer. Following these events, Amer submitted her notice of resignation, which took effect March 9, 2026, and was formally accepted at a Special AMS Assembly on March 3.

Amer's departure prompted Vice-President (Operations) Elena Nurzynski, who had planned to announce her own intent to resign for personal reasons, to rescind that plan and remain in her role for the rest of the term to ensure leadership stability. President-elect and Board Chair Dreyden George was subsequently appointed Interim President to serve through April 30, 2026.

=== 2024 — AMS policy threatens Journal editorial autonomy ===
In late 2024, The Queen's Journal reported on a proposed AMS policy that the paper's editors argued would threaten its constitutionally guaranteed editorial independence. The Journal expressed concern that the policy could create mechanisms for the AMS to exert influence over editorial decisions, contrary to the AMS constitution and by-laws, which explicitly protect the paper's autonomy. The controversy reignited debate about the ongoing tension between the AMS as a funding body and the Journal as an independent press outlet.

=== 2021 — Misogynistic signage at unsanctioned Homecoming ===
During unsanctioned Homecoming gatherings in 2021, misogynistic signs were displayed on houses in the University District. The AMS committed to a formal review of the broader pattern of such signs and their contribution to a culture of gender-based violence on campus.

=== 2018 — Racist video surfaces during election campaign ===
During the 2018 AMS election cycle, a past video resurfaced featuring a candidate for AMS Vice-President (Operations) performing a racist depiction of Mexican culture. This followed the 2013 election, which student leaders and The Queen's Journal described as "toxic," marked by intense and personal animosity between competing campaign teams.

== Notable people ==
Over its 168-year history, a number of individuals closely connected to the AMS have gone on to prominent careers in public life, journalism, law, and business. A 2022 survey by two former AMS presidents, Stewart Goodings and Jane Matthews Glenn, found that nearly all respondents said their time in the AMS had a major influence on their later careers.

=== Former AMS presidents ===
- Chuck Edwards (1968)
  - First directly-elected AMS president in modern Queen's history; resigned after pushing the AMS toward student radicalism, Vietnam war protests, and support for striking Kingston workers.
- Dorothy Wardle (1941)
  - First woman president of the AMS, elected during the Second World War.
- Emily Moore (1990–91)
  - Defended the non-academic discipline system after the "No Means No" vandalism and the Montreal Massacre; actively increased the hiring of students of colour in senior salaried positions.
- Taslim Pirmohamed Tagore (1994–95)
  - First minority woman president. Faced significant pushback and racism during her term in what she described as a "culture of assimilation."
- Gregory Frankson (1996–97)
  - First Black AMS President. Chaired the Robert Sutherland Task Force, leading to the Robert Sutherland Room (1998) and the rededication of Robert Sutherland Hall (2009).
- Ruth Osunde (2024-25)
  - First Black woman AMS President.
- Dreyden George (2025–27)
  - First Indigenous AMS President.

=== The Queen's Journal alumni ===
- Charlotte Whitton
  - First female Editor-in-Chief of the Journal (1917). Later became the first woman elected mayor of a major Canadian city (Ottawa).
- Robertson Davies
  - Literary editor of the Journal in the 1930s. Became one of Canada's most celebrated novelists; his Salterton trilogy drew on his Kingston experiences.
- Ali Velshi
  - Contributed to the Journal for two years. Credits the paper with launching his career; went on to CNN, Al Jazeera America, and MSNBC.
- Jeffrey Simpson
  - Former political columnist for The Globe and Mail and Governor General's Award-winning author.
- Jeffrey Kofman
  - Former ABC News correspondent.
- John Stackhouse
  - Former editor-in-chief of The Globe and Mail.
- Giles Gherson
  - Former editor-in-chief of the Toronto Star.

== Awards and honorary life members ==
The AMS occasionally awards an Honorary Life Membership to individuals who have shown exceptional dedication to AMS members and student life. It is the highest honour the Society can give, and recipients are considered AMS members for life. The award is not given annually.

- Lyn Parry (2024–25)
  - Served 14 years within the AMS, four as Financial Controller and ten as General Manager. Parry is widely regarded by students and staff as the institutional backbone of the AMS, having supported and mentored countless student executives through more than a decade of annual leadership transitions. She kept the organization stable and running behind the scenes, and is credited with preserving the institutional memory that allowed each new generation of student leaders to hit the ground running.
- Donna Janiec (2018–19)
  - Queen's Vice-Principal of Finance and Administration. Awarded unanimously by AMS Assembly for her ongoing advocacy and work during the JDUC Redevelopment Project. AMS President Miguel Martinez stated that "many of the sentiments shared during Assembly were echoed throughout the room amongst students who had the opportunity to interact with Donna."
- Patrick Deane (2009–10)
  - Became the 21st Principal and Vice-Chancellor of Queen's University in 2019, having previously served as President and Vice-Chancellor of McMaster University for nine years. Praised in internal records as an indispensable "asset" to the Judicial System of the AMS.
- Raili Giguere (2009–10)
  - Commended for 29 years of long-term dedication as a permanent staff member. Giguere was with the AMS through transformative changes, from when offices were located in the "bomb shelter," through the CFRC addition, Destinations, and CoGro. She was with the AMS before computers were present and through 29 annual leadership transitions.
- Ian Nordheimer (1975–76)
  - Former AMS VP operations who stepped into the AMS presidency during a crisis when the sitting president resigned. The outgoing VP University Affairs expressed gratitude: "Ian kept the ship of the state afloat when everyone else was heading to the lifeboats."
- Marv Bloos (1973–74)
  - Described as "one of Queen's most extraordinary students, a perceptive and provocative participant in student government." Held numerous positions including President of Arts '72, President of the Arts and Science Undergraduate Society, AMS Education Commissioner, and member of the board of directors.
- Andy Pipe (1972–73)
  - Awarded during his term as Services Commissioner. Commended for having "developed and exhibited the greatest capacity in leading the student body" and for being a "social leader who thinks in terms of ideals, policies and laws rather than institutions."
- Richard Alan Broadbent (1972–73)
  - The first student to serve as University Rector. AMS President LeBlanc wrote: "We were always grateful for your sound advice and keen interest in our affairs. We know you represented us ably to the Board of Trustees."
- Patrick Riley (1971–72)
  - AMS President at the time; nominated for the Tricolour Award but not selected following a controversy in the selection process. In response, AMS Assembly (Outer Council) unanimously granted him the Honorary Life Membership, reviving an honour that, according to The Journal, had "not been given for a number of years, if ever."

== Membership ==
The AMS currently represents over 20,000 undergraduate students, each of whom becomes a member of the Society upon paying the mandatory student activity fee along with their tuition. Membership is mandatory for full-time students enrolled in one of the AMS-constituent faculties. Through its fees, the AMS administers the mandatory AMS Health and Dental Plan and the Bus-It program, which provides students with unlimited access to Kingston Transit. In 2023, the AMS partnered with Via Rail to offer students a continuous 15% discount on train tickets.

== Political affiliations ==
Provincially, the AMS is a founding member of the Ontario Undergraduate Student Alliance (OUSA), having joined at its foundation in 1992. The AMS left OUSA in 1995 but rejoined as full members in 2004 after several years as associate observers.

Federally, the AMS joined the Canadian Alliance of Student Associations (CASA) in 2009 on a one-year associate membership basis, but the membership expired without renewal in 2010. In 2015, the AMS joined several other student associations from U15 Group of Canadian Research Universities schools in forming the Undergraduates of Canadian Research Intensive Universities (UCRU).

== See also ==
- The Queen's Journal
- CFRC
- Ontario Undergraduate Student Alliance
- Canadian Alliance of Student Associations
- List of Ontario students' associations
