= Trent Durham Student Association =

- Abbreviation: TDSA
- Formation: 2010
- Location: Oshawa, Ontario, Canada.
- President: Anthony Coulter
- VP of Campus Life: Sabina Kapoor
- VP of External Affairs: Prabhmeet Kaur
- Affiliations: OUSA
- Website: www.mytdsa.ca

The Trent Durham Student Association (TDSA) is a non-profit and was created to represent all undergraduate and post-grad certificate students, part-time and full-time, who attend classes at the Durham Campus of Trent University. The TDSA is also a member of the Ontario Undergraduate Student Alliance where the TDSA Vice President of External Affairs sits as a board member. In collaboration with OUSA the TDSA have advocated to students by working with the provincial and local governments to provide students with services they may need.

== History of the TDSA ==
Trent University has been located in Oshawa since they started offering classes in 1974 and the campus was originally known as Trent University of Oshawa. Students who attended classes during this time went to the same campus as the students at University of Ontario Institute of Technology and Durham College where students of all three institutions shared the same student association which was called "YOURSA".

In 2009, Trent University decided to move the Durham Campus out of the DC/UOIT campus and relocate it to the site of what once was St. Michael's Catholic school which was located at 55 Thornton Road South in Oshawa. Once the campus was established at this new location the University formed the Trent Oshawa Student Association in 2010 to represent students attending the Durham Campus of Trent University. This association was later renamed the Trent Durham Student Association when Trent University renamed the satellite school Trent University Durham GTA .

== TDSA Available Services ==
TDSA has a number of established services to help the Durham students, including events, clubs, bursaries, and health benefits. Some of the current financial aid available to students are:

- Hygiene Product Fund
- Emergency Bursary Fund
- Gender Affirming Care Grant
- Grocery Assistance Fund

The TDSA also supports clubs that are located on the campus. Current clubs include:

- African Black Caribbean Club
- Child & Youth Studies Intersectionality Circle
- Trent DND Club
- Trent English Student Society Oshawa
- Theater Trent

== See also ==
- List of Ontario students' associations
