= York Federation of Students =

- Institution: York University
- Location: Toronto, Ontario, Canada
- Members: Approximately 55,000
- Affiliations: CFS
- Colours: Red & White
- Website: www.yfs.ca

York Federation of Students (YFS) is a student union which represents approximately 55,000 students at York University in Toronto, Ontario, Canada. The York Federation of Students is a member of the Canadian Federation of Students (Local 68).

== History ==
The student government was founded in 1968 as the York Student Council. Around 1975, the student government had begun to be known as the Council of the York Student Federation, and as of September 15th, 1979, it was incorporated as a not-for-profit organisation under the name of "York Federation of Students," a name credited to its president at the time, Jian Ghomeshi.

== About ==
The York Federation of Students' stated purpose is to ensure that students have a holistic university experience through its four main pillars: Services, Events, Clubs and Campaigns. The composition of its Board of Directors includes five Executive members and 18 Directors, representing every College government and Faculty at York University.

Its stated purposes include the representation, promotion, and defense of the common interests of undergraduate students at York University. Additionally, it aims for the promotion and support of undergraduate student associations across York University through the recognition, funding, and ratification of various clubs and on-campus services.

=== Administration ===
The student government is administered by five full-time undergraduate executives, along with several full and part-time staff members, the latter of which consists primarily of undergraduate students.

Day-to-day operations are overseen by the elected Executive, who also runs campaigns and provides advocacy for undergrads with assistance from full-time long-term staff. When deemed necessary, the Board of Directors holds open meetings to allow general membership, which encompasses all York undergraduate Students, to ratify the decisions of the Board of Directors.

The YFS also holds Annual General Meetings, allowing general membership to put forward motions and vote on policies and funding decisions.

=== Elections ===
Yearly elections for the following year's Executive and Board positions are held during the Winter semester. All part-time positions are also re-staffed annually. Elected terms last from May 1 to April 30 of the following year.

In the event of Board or Executive vacancies which occur prior to September 1, elections are held in the Fall semester.

=== Executives ===
There are 5 executive positions; President, Vice President Operations, Vice President Campaigns & Advocacy, Vice President Equity, and Vice President Campus Life. These are elected full-time positions. The five executives also comprise the Executive Committee, with the addition of the Executive Director.

=== Board of Directors ===
The YFS Board of Directors meets to vote on certain functions of the union. Only members of the Board of Directors hold voting rights outside of Annual General Meetings.

All votes for the YFS Board of Directors are held by the Executive, and 11 college and 7 faculty seats. The College Board Members represent students at their respective College Councils, while Faculty Board Members represent students and sit on the various Faculty Councils.

=== Staff ===
There are 10 full time staff employed by the YFS. These positions assist and manage various departments within the portfolios of the Executives. There are also various part-time staff positions employed by the organization.

== Services ==
Services offered by the YFS include:

- Photocopying
- A partnership with Places4Students, an off-campus housing program
- TTC Post-Secondary ID
- Student Work Abroad Program
- International Student Identity Card (ISIC)
- Handbooks & daily planners
- Tax clinics using UFile software
- Student advocacy services
- A food bank
- Printing via the Members’ Service Office (MSO)
- Discounted tickets to select Toronto sightseeing attractions via the MSO

In addition to discounted tickets available at the MSO, the Federation offers discounted online services for:

- PrintersPlus
- Ergotron
- The Princeton Review
- Levelup VR Arcade Toronto
- FlightHub
- HelloFresh
- Contiki Holidays
- Medieval Times
- Pinot's Palette
- Wet 'n' Wild Toronto
- UFile Tax Filing
- K1 Speedway
- Fresh Paint Studios
- York United FC
- Enjoy Travel Car Rental
- Royal Ontario Museum
- Pursuit OCR

=== Health & Dental Plan ===
All undergraduate students at York University have access to an opt-out health plan provided by the YFS. The plan includes basic dental care, vision care, prescription medication coverage, mental health services, and travel insurance. Opting out requires comparable extended health coverage.

== Events ==
The YFS runs a variety of campus events for York University students, usually free or otherwise subsidised for greater accessibility.

Their primary recurring events are YorkFest and CultureFest.

- YorkFest is a large orientation week event which features a yearly club fair, as well as a selection of social events which vary year by year.
- CultureFest is a campus celebration of cultural diversity, featuring music and dance performances from various cultural clubs on campus.

== Campaigns + Equity ==
YFS aims to develop campaigns that reflect the social, economic, and political interests of students. It is an equity-based organization that advertises itself as working with an anti-oppressive lens throughout its operations.

Ongoing campaigns include hosting annual event series, such as Mental Health Awareness Week and Xpressions Against Oppressions (XAO) Week.

== Clubs and Community Service Groups ==
The majority of the clubs at York are ratified with the YFS, which provides base funding as well as event funding to aid clubs in servicing students, along with providing rooms in the Student Centers for club use. There are almost 400 clubs ratified under the YFS.

There are five Community Service Groups under the YFS which provide spaces and services to diverse communities within campus in order to aid accommodation. These groups are TBLGAY (Trans, Bisexual, Lesbian, Gay, Asexual at York), YUBSA (York United Black Students Alliance), YFS ACCESS CENTRE, ISAY (Indigenous Students Association at York), and USAY (United South Asians at York).

== Past Endeavours ==
The York Federation of Students has partaken in a variety of initiatives and campaigns for student well-being. Of those which were successful, it has:

- Lobbied for a full Fall reading week
- Lobbied for the introduction of the Second Student Centre at York University
- Facilitated the provision of free menstrual products in all bathrooms of both Student Centres
- Lobbied for the removal of ProctorTrack proctoring software usage in examinations
- Lobbied for the end of the sale of bottled uncarbonated water at York University
- Lobbied for the York University gymnasium to have designated women’s only gym time
- Lobbied for a freeze on increases in international student fees in 2021
- Defeated the Ontario Provincial Government in court for the reversal of the Student Choice initiative (SCI)

== See also ==
- List of Ontario students' associations
- York University Faculty Association
- York University
