= Central Student Association =

- Institution: University of Guelph
- Location: Guelph, Ontario, Canada
- Established: 1979
- President: Emilie Dudgeon
- Vice presidents: Ash Ames (VP External); Kennedy McGregor (VP Academic); Sydney Hooper (VP Internal)
- Members: 28,055
- Affiliations: CFS
- Budget: $2,439,360.00
Colours
- Website: csaonline.ca

The Central Student Association, also known as the CSA, is the student union for all undergraduate students at the University of Guelph.

== History ==
The current CSA is the third iteration of a central student union on the Guelph campus. It was founded in 1973. The first cross-College student government was Union Council which lasted from the end of World War Two until 1970 when—because of a major disagreement over the University Centre—the University drove it into bankruptcy and dissolution.

In 1966 students agreed to fund a "Student Union Building" with no university operations in it at all. In 1968 they agreed—again by referendum—to fund an expanded building which was to be called the University Community Centre which would house university run services that students needed to directly access such as counselling services, registration and financial aid.

By 1970 the university decided that the building would be all that and also house all administration functions as well. Union Council claimed that such a building would violate the terms of the referendum and therefore they should build what the students said they wanted or return the money collected. The University countered by saying that the newly incorporated Union Council (which changed its name to the University of Guelph Student Union) had no say in how the fees collected would be spent, that they didn't "recognize" this new entity as the legitimate student government. At the same time, the University decided that fees paid to the Union Council (which they had collected up to this point and gave over to the new "Student Union" that they claimed had no standing) should be voluntary. They stopped collecting the fee and that soon drove the organization into bankruptcy. With no money to operate or to fight the University Centre battle with, the organization dissolved itself.

The second student "government" was the Committee of College Presidents (OAC, OVC, Mac, and Arts). It was a loose association whose main function was to make sure that social events and some services (such as the Ontarion) would survive. It lasted only three years—long enough for the university to take the student money and build the building they had decided on. The Committee did not do much except to create a real student government called the University of Guelph Central Student (note the singular "student") Association. It was first known as UGCSA, but it lost the UG a couple of years later and by 1977 it was known by all as the CSA. Unlike the committee, it was a directly elected body, and soon an incorporated one.

One of its first actions was to sue the university for breach of trust over the University Centre. The CSA worked to regain student control of the UC from the university in the 1970s and finally settled out of court on the matter, establishing a University Centre Board with a majority of student representatives. Students continue to pay a fee for the building.

From 1973 until 1993 the CSA had a structure with a president and vice presidents (varying in number) and a voting council made up of reps from the colleges (one appointed by the College Student Government and two voted in "at large"). After 1993 the structure has been flattened, with various kinds of commissioners and spokespeople representing the various (and changing) efforts of the association. In addition there are now voting places for other student organizations and groups as well as the colleges.

The CSA is a member local of the Canadian Federation of Students (CFS) since 1987. In 2010, students vote to hold a decertification referendum from the national and provincial chapters of the CFS. The vote is challenged in court. The referendum is held under parameters outlined by the judge. In 2012, the CFS is granted an appeal by the Ontario Court of Appeal, due to the 2010 judge’s failure to provide reasons for his decision in the original referendum court case, rendering the referendum no longer binding. Membership with CFS is continued. In 2013, the CSA continued correspondence with the university, requesting recollection of CFS fees, but without success. The CSA Board of Directors passes a motion to file a joint application with the CFS, to put the university’s uncollected membership fees before a judge. The dispute of uncollected fees is settled in 2017 with a settlement between the CSA board of directors with CFS and the University of Guelph Administration

== About ==
The CSA is a democratically organized, dues paying student union representing over 25,000 full and part-time undergrad students at the University of Guelph.

The purpose of the CSA is to bring together the elected representatives of all the college governments on campus. The CSA also has appointed members of campus organizations into a single body. The CSA provides services such as a health plan, the universal bus pass, and the Student Help and Advocacy Centre. The CSA also owns and operates the Bullring campus pub, and also appoints members to the University Centre Board. Many Campus Organizations and Clubs are recognized under the CSA, and together with the different club offices, occupy over half of the second floor of the University Centre.

=== Administration ===
The student government is administered by four full-time undergraduate executives. These executives are:

- President
- VP Internal
- VP Academic
- VP External

The day-to-day operations are overseen by the elected Executive, who also lead various campaigns and advocate for all undergraduate students with the assistance of full-time staff members. The CSA employs a number of part-time student service staff.

The elected and appointed Board of Directors holds open meetings every two weeks throughout the school year and over the summer semester, though emergency meetings are also called when needed with 48 hours notice. The general membership meets annually to review the auditor's report, ratify changes made to the CSA's by-laws by the Board of Directors, and provide ground level participation to the operation of the CSA.

=== Elections ===
Elections are held every Winter semester to select the next years Executive and Board. Hiring for most part-time positions takes place in the winter semester as well. For vacancies in the Executive positions, a Spring By-Election may be held immediately following. For Board of Directors positions, a Fall By-Election takes place in the following Fall Semester, after which representatives may be appointed to any remaining vacant seats.

=== Board of Directors ===
CSA Board of Directors meet four times per semester. Board meetings are scheduled in advance, and are held on Wednesdays. In the summer months, the board meetings are held online via Microsoft Teams, and in the Fall and Winter semesters, they usually meet in a larger room in the University Centre. All the Board meetings are open to the public, however visitors must be granted speaking rights by the Board to participate in discussions. Only members of the Board of Directors hold voting rights.

Votes on the CSA Board of Directors by 14 At-Large individuals (elected, 2 per college), 7 College Governments (appointed), and 9 student organizations (appointed).In the Commissioner structure, all five executive had votes. With the new structure, the executive act as passive board members who can motivate and introduce motions, but cannot vote.

=== Services ===
The CSA provides a number of services to its constituency. These include:

- The Bullring
- Universal Student Bus Pass (with the Graduate Student Union)
- thecannon.ca (in partnership with the Guelph Campus Co-Op)
- SafeWalk
- Guelph Student FoodBank
- The Bike Centre
- CSA Clubs
- Health and Dental Plan
- Student Help and Advocacy Centre (SHAC)
- Printing & Promotional Services
- Menstrual Hygiene Initiative (free menstrual products)

== Past Executives ==
The following is a partial list of past executive members of the Central Student Association:

Academic Year	Position	Name	Term
2025–2026	President	Emilie Dudgeon	May 2026 – Present
2025–2026	VP Internal	Sydney Hooper	May 2026 – Present
2025–2026	VP Academic	Kennedy McGregor	May 2026 – Present
2025–2026	VP External	Ash Ames	May 2026 - Present
2025–2026	President	Nate Broughton	May 2025 – April 2026
2025–2026	VP Student Experience	Pawandeep Singh	May 2025 – March 2026
2025–2026	VP Academic	William Coleman	May 2025 – April 2026
2025–2026	VP External	Natalie Wilkinson	May 2025
2024–2025	President	Nate Broughton	October 2024 – April 2025
2024–2025	President	Hartej Singh	May 2024 – October 2024
2024–2025	VP Student Experience	Naomi Amayaevbo	October 2024 – April 2025
2024–2025	VP Student Experience	Simran Kalra	May 2024 – August 2024
2024–2025	VP Academic	William Coleman	September 2024 – April 2025
2024–2025	VP Academic	Bawneet Singh	May 2024 – August 2024
2024–2025	VP External	Natalie Wilkinson	May 2024 – April 2025
2023–2024	President	Shaima Alam	May 2023 – Apr 2024
2023–2024	VP Student Experience	McKenna Williams	November 2023 – April 2024
2023–2024	VP Academic	Bawneet Singh	November 2023 – April 2024
2023–2024	VP Academic	Junpyo Lee	May 2023 – November 2023
2023–2024	VP External	Samar Tariq	May 2023 – April 2024
2022–2023	President	Nicole Walker	May 2022 – April 2023
2022–2023	VP Student Experience	Vacant	May 2022 – April 2023
2022–2023	VP Academic	Mason Friebe	May 2022 – April 2023
2022–2023	VP External	Jena-Lee Ashley	May 2022 – April 2023
2021–2022	President	Nicole Walker	May 2021 – April 2022
2021–2022	VP Student Experience	Sara Kuwatly	May 2021 – December 2021
2021–2022	VP Academic	Lisa Kazuhara	May 2021 – April 2022
2021–2022	VP External	Shilik Hamad	May 2021 – April 2022
2020–2021	President	Tyler Poirier	May 2020 – April 2021
2020–2021	VP Student Experience	Sara Kuwalty	May 2020 – April 2021
2020–2021	VP Academic	Vacant	May 2020 – April 2021
2020–2021	VP External	Horeen Hassan	May 2020 – April 2021
2019–2020	President	Dena Van de Coevering	May 2019 – April 2020
2019–2020	VP Student Experience	Claudia Idzik	May 2019 – April 2020
2019–2020	VP Academic	Lindsay Fletcher	May 2019 – April 2020
2019–2020	VP External	Horeen Hassan	May 2019 – April 2020
2018–2019	President	Jack Fisher	May 2018 – April 2019
2018–2019	VP Student Experience	Aidan Paskinov	May 2018 – April 2019
2018–2019	VP Academic	Natalie Clarke	May 2018 – April 2019
2018–2019	VP External	Kayla Weiler	May 2018 – April 2019
2017–2018	President	Chelsea Mulvale	May 2017 – April 2018
2017–2018	VP Student Experience	Emily Vance	May 2017 – April 2018
2017–2018	VP Academic	Becca Cheskes	May 2017 – April 2018
2017–2018	VP External	Kayla Weiler	May 2017 – April 2018

== See also ==
- List of Ontario students' associations
