= Grecești =

- Commune
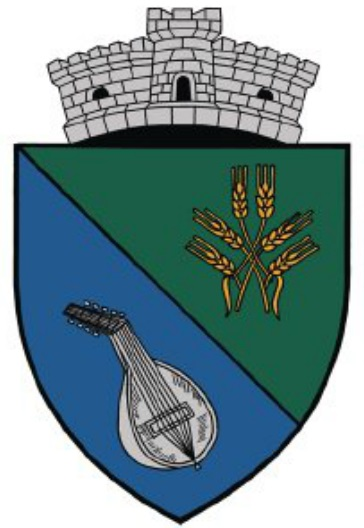
- Coat of arms

- Location in Romania
- Coordinates: 44°27′N 23°17′E
- Country: Romania
- County: Dolj
- Area: 48.29 km^{2} (18.64 sq mi)
- Population (2021-12-01): 1,497
  - Density: 31.00/km^{2} (80.29/sq mi)
- Time zone: UTC+02:00 (EET)
  - Summer (DST): UTC+03:00 (EEST)
- Vehicle reg.: DJ

Grecești is a commune in Dolj County, Oltenia, Romania with a population of 2,038 people. It is composed of six villages: Bărboi, Busu, Busulețu, Grădiștea, Grecești and Gropanele.
