= Jeffrey Kofman =

Jeffrey Kofman (born May 20, 1959) is a former reporter and co-founder and CEO of Trint.

== ABC News London Bureau ==
As London-based correspondent for ABC News he reported on stories in Europe. Prior to his assignment overseas, Kofman spent 10 years based in Miami for ABC News as correspondent for Florida, the Caribbean, and Latin America.

He moved to ABC's London bureau in January 2010 where he covered the Arab revolutions in North Africa from Tunisia, Libya, and Egypt. He has reported from South Africa, Kenya, Norway, Sweden and Italy, and the Indian Ocean.

In 2011, he won an Emmy for his coverage of the Libyan Revolution and the downfall of Col. Muammar Gadhafi. Kofman covered the revolution in Libya from its beginning to its end. He reported from Tripoli as Gadhafi struggled to sustain his dictatorship.

== ABC News Miami Bureau ==
While based in Miami, August 2010, Kofman was the first foreign news correspondent on the scene when 33 trapped miners were found alive in a collapsed mine in Chile's northern desert.

During his decade in Miami, Kofman reported on cancer research in Ecuador.

Kofman spent a month in Haiti in early 2004 when guerrillas took control of much of the country. He has traveled throughout Colombia, covering U.S. efforts to wipe out the drug trade in that country.

Kofman also covered Cuba extensively, reporting on the impact of the long stalemate between the U.S. and that country.

== ABC News War Reporting ==
Kofman did six tours in the Middle East after September 11, 2001: four in Iraq, one in the Arabian Sea during the war in Afghanistan, and one in Pakistan.

While in Iraq, Kofman was embedded with U.S. Marines in the southern part of the country. He traveled to some of the most troubled regions, including Fallujah and Samarra. In July 2003, he reported on the declining morale of U.S. troops in the region as their tours of duty kept getting extended. The story was picked up by outlets around the world when one soldier called on Defense Secretary Donald Rumsfeld to resign. Kofman was reportedly the target of a smear campaign as a reaction to his report.

== CBS News ==
Kofman came to ABC News from CBS News, where he was a correspondent in the network's New York Bureau from 1997 to 2001.

== CBC Television ==
Before joining CBS, Kofman was a correspondent at CBC Television in Toronto. During his 11 years at the CBC, he was host of a current affairs program, anchor of the CBC's Toronto newscast, a network radio host, and sub-anchor for the CBC's flagship nightly network newscast, The National.

Born in Toronto, he is a graduate of Upper Canada College and then Queen's University in Kingston, Ontario, where he studied political science.

== Trint ==
Kofman is co-founder and CEO of Trint, an automated transcription service.
