= Brock University Students' Union =

Union in St. Catharines, Ontario, Canada

- Institution: Brock University
- Location: St. Catharines, Ontario
- Established: 1964
- President: Anusha Pahuja
- Vice presidents: Carleigh Charlton (VPUA), Mark Chabroski (VPEA), Shinaya Peiris (VPSS)
- Affiliations: OUSA, CASA
- Website: www.brockbusu.ca

The Brock University Students' Union (BUSU) is the students' union representing the over 19,000 undergraduate students of Brock University in St. Catharines, Ontario, Canada. BUSU is a founding and current member of the Ontario Undergraduate Student Alliance.

== Governance ==
The previous logo used until 2017.

=== Executive ===
The Brock University Students' Union executive is made up of four popularly elected students: the President, the Vice President Student Services, the Vice President External Affairs and the Vice President University Affairs.

=== Administrative Council ===
The Brock University Students Administrative Council (BUSAC) is a popularly elected legislative body composed of representatives from all academic faculties of the university as well as representatives for residence, off-campus, and international students.

=== Board of Directors ===
The Brock University Students' Union Board of Directors comprises seven members, the president and one other executive member, two members of BUSAC as appointed by BUSAC, as well as three student at large members elected in general elections. The board of directors is responsible for overseeing the human resources of the students' union, as well as having a fiduciary relationship with the organization, particularly in regard to its corporate and legal responsibilities. The Board also serves a quasi-judicial function as the highest level of appeal for all redresses of grievance with, or within BUSU.

== Services ==
BUSU operates student services that have the goal to improve the quality of students on campus experience at Brock.

BUSU is responsible for running the O-Week in conjunction with Brock University during the first week of the school year, putting on all-ages events and information fairs for first-year students at Brock as well as returning students.

BUSU provides extended health and accident insurance programs for Brock students through their health and dental plan. The goal is to provide peace of mind through insurance and to offset costs associated with their health needs. Coverage includes prescription drug coverage, accidental travel insurance, emergency dental coverage, and optical coverage.

BUSU provides every Brock student taking 1.5 credits or more with unlimited use of St. Catharines, Welland, and Niagara Falls Transit. This service is paid for by an ancillary fee collected with student tuition. The U-Pass was first implemented after a student referendum in 2003.

BUSU operates Brock Aid, which is a first aid responders team that provides emergency medical response during BUSU events.

BUSU also oversees BrockTV, the online campus television network. BrockTV provides all facets of student-made content from news briefs and guest lectures, to varsity highlights, musician interviews and entertainment parodies.

=== Clubs ===
The Brock University Students' Union ratifies student clubs and provides them with funding and organizational assistance. BUSU provides clubs with room bookings, BUSU.net e-mail addresses, postings on the BUSU bulletin boards and advertising in the Brock Press. BUSU clubs are overseen by the BUSU Vice President Student Services.

== Businesses ==
The Brock University Students' Union operates several businesses on campus, including the campus bar, Isaac's; the Students' Centre cafeteria, Union Station; and the on-campus convenience store General Brock. BUSU is unique to many other students unions in relation to their campus bar as they are one of the few student unions that hold their own liquor license, as opposed to the university holding it.

== Alumni Student Centre ==
The Alumni Student Centre is the head office of BUSU and is owned and operated by BUSU. All BUSU offices are housed in the Alumni Student Centre. The Alumni Student Centre contains a lounge for off-campus students, discount photocopiers for student use, and a coffee shop. The offices of the Brock Press and BrockTV are also in the Student Centre. The campus bar, Isaac's, Skybar Lounge, and the Union Station food court also occupy the Alumni Student Centre.

== Representation ==
The Brock University Students' Union was a founding member of the Ontario Undergraduate Student Alliance. The student association is also an observer member of Canadian Alliance of Student Associations.

== Controversies ==
=== Black face incident ===
In 2015 a group of Brock students dressed as the Jamaican bobsled team for a Halloween night at Isaac's Bar. Some students in the costume were found to have put on black faces, prompting controversy. BUSU has since begun monitoring costumes entering their bar as a result. This was the third time a black face incident had happened on campus, as former students also won for the bobsled team costume, and one in 2009 won the contest for dressing up as Lil' Wayne.

=== 2022 Student Election Sexual Assault Scandal ===
In February 2022 an anonymous Reddit post alluded to reports of sexual misconduct against one of the student executive candidates. While BUSU was not aware of any such incidents prior to this Reddit post, there was a statement made on Instagram that was later deleted as it was viewed as not supportive of survivors. BUSU apologized for the original statement with the following statement.

“We recognize that a previous statement made via this social media channel was not written in a way that was supportive of survivors of sexual violence. It was for this reason taken down. We apologize to those who were made to feel unsafe, triggered, or that they could not come forward. This was truly not our intention.

We do not believe, and it was not our intention to convey that because this allegation came through certain channels, that it is not fully valid. We do take all allegations very seriously. With full transparency, yes, there have been serious allegations made online against certain candidates in this election. We aim through this statement, and the actions we plan to take, to convey the severity with which we acknowledge any allegations of harassment or misconduct.“

As a result of the accusations, some portions of the student election were postponed. BUSU staff and board also committed to an action plan that included additional student representation, increasing their Board of Directors to 13 voting students, changing the election process to a nomination process that includes a stricter vetting process of candidates, further Gender and Sexual Violence education and training for all staff and board members through Brock's Human Rights and Equity services, and further transparency with all BUSU Board Meetings now filmed and available via YouTube.

== See also ==
- List of Ontario students' associations
- Canadian Alliance of Students Associations
- Ontario Undergraduate Student Alliance
