= Ontario Undergraduate Student Alliance =

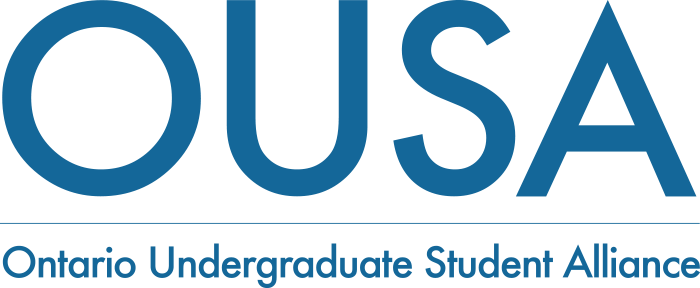
- Abbreviation: OUSA
- Formation: Formed 1992, Incorporated 1995
- Location: Toronto, Ontario, Canada.
- President: Sayak Sneddon-Ghosal (WLUSU)
- VP Finance: Omar Sayyed (USC)
- VP Admin & HR: Stephen DeCordova (MSU)
- Steering Committee: See Steering Committee
- Key people: Sayak Sneddon-Ghosal; Omar Sayyed; Stephen DeCordova
- Affiliations: CSA, CASA, UCRU, Student Mental Health Canada
- Staff: Malika Dhanani; Octavia Andrade-Dixon; Abishane Suthakaran; Tiffany Li Wu
- Website: www.ousa.ca

The Ontario Undergraduate Student Alliance (OUSA) is an alliance of students' unions in Ontario, Canada. Their common objective is to protect the interests of over 160,000 professional and undergraduate, full-time and part-time university students, and to provide research and recommendations to the government on how to improve accessibility, affordability, accountability, and quality of post-secondary education in Ontario.

== History ==
The initial catalyst for the creation of OUSA was disagreement over the position of the provincial and national student association in Ontario on the first Gulf War. In 1992, The student associations of Brock University, Queen's University, the University of Waterloo and Wilfrid Laurier University, and the Association of Part-Time Undergraduate Students at the University of Toronto approached the Ontario Federation of Students (OFS) to host a roundtable discussing the prospect of pushing for an increase in tuition fees. When this idea was rejected, the roundtable occurred informally and resulted in the formal incorporation and creation of OUSA.

Part-time students at the University of Toronto withdrew from the Alliance, as did Queen's Alma Mater Society, citing concerns over the organization's management in the mid-1990s. Queen's then rejoined the Alliance as an associate member in 2001 and then as a full member in 2004. In May 2011, OUSA welcomed two new members, the Trent in Oshawa Student Association (later the Trent Durham Student Association) as associate members, and the McMaster Association of Part-Time Students as full members, who had rejoined after a 7-year absence. In May 2013, the University of Windsor Students' Alliance voted, through a referendum, to leave the Alliance. On April 29, 2014, the McMaster Association of Part-Time Students also withdrew from membership in OUSA.

The Students' General Association (SGA-AGÉ) of Laurentian University was admitted into OUSA in April 2016, with membership taking effect May 2016. Most recently, the Ontario Tech Student Union (OTSU) joined OUSA as a full member in April 2023.

== Members ==
As of 2023, OUSA's membership consists of:

- Trent Durham Student Association
- Laurentian University Students' General Association/Association Générale des Étudiants
- Wilfrid Laurier University Students' Union
- McMaster Students Union
- Waterloo Undergraduate Student Association
- Brock University Students' Union
- University Students' Council of Western University
- Alma Mater Society of Queen's University
- Ontario Tech Student Union

== Steering Committee ==
OUSA's Steering Committee is the body responsible for setting and monitoring the organization's priorities and strategic initiatives. It is also the non-profit organization's board of directors. One executive member of each constituent student union sits on the board as a voting member. According to the organization's Bylaws, each association is entitled to appoint one additional non-voting resource member to OUSA's Steering Committee. Alma Mater Society of Queen's University is the only OUSA member in recent years that regularly uses this provision to appoint an additional member.

As of May 2024, the membership of the committee is:

Title	Name	Student Union
President	Sayak Sneddon-Ghosal	WLUSU
VP Finance	Omar Sayyed	USC
VP Administration & Human Resources	Stephen DeCordova	MSU
Additional voting members	Aaditya Gupta	BUSU
Additional voting members	Edlira Ballaj	AMS
Additional voting members	Remington Zhi	WUSA
Additional voting members	Staysha Kasunich	SGA-AGÉ
Additional voting members		TDSA
Additional voting members	Eloghosa Avenbuan	OTSU

== Criticisms ==
Due to its moderate leanings when compared with other student advocacy groups and close working relationship with many decision makers, OUSA has faced criticism that they are too cooperative with the government. OUSA has also received criticism for a mid 1990s proposal that asked for increased government spending towards universities along with increased tuition fees, however this recommendation was reversed a few years later, and OUSA has called for tuition freezes and decreases since at least 1999.

== Presidents and Executive Directors ==
Presidents

- 1998 - 1999 Kenzie Campbell
- 1999 - 2000 Basil Alexander
- 2000 - 2001 Mark Schaan
- 2001 - 2002 Erin McCloskey
- 2002 - 2003 Josh Morgan
- 2003 - 2004 Jeff LaPorte
- 2004 - 2005 Alison Forbes
- 2005 - 2006 Stephanie Murray
- 2006 - 2007 Paris Meilleur
- 2007 - 2008 David Simmonds
- 2008 - 2009 Trevor Mayoh
- 2009 - 2010 Dan Moulton
- 2010 - 2011 Meaghan Coker
- 2011 - 2012 Sean Madden
- 2012 - 2013 Alysha Li
- 2013 - 2014 Amir Eftekarpour
- 2014 - 2015 Jen Carter
- 2015 - 2016 Spencer Nestico-Semianiw
- 2016 - 2017 Jamie Cleary
- 2017 - 2018 Andrew Clubine
- 2018 - 2019 Danny Chang
- 2019 - 2020 Catherine Dunne
- 2020 - 2021 Julia Pereira
- 2021 - 2022 Eunice Oladejo
- 2022 - 2023 Jessica Look
- 2023 – 2024 Vivian Chiem
- 2024 – 2025 Michelle Wodchis-Johnson
- 2025 - 2026 Sayak Sneddon-Ghosal
- 2026 - Present Rory Norris

Executive Directors

- 1994 - 1996 Michael Burns
- 1997 Rick Marin (Interim)
- 1997 - 1998 Barry McCartan
- 1998 - 1999 Andrew Boggs
- 1999 - 2001 Ryan Parks
- 2001 - 2002 Bryce Rudyk
- 2002 James Meloche (Interim)
- 2002 - 2003 Leslie Church
- 2003 - 2005 Adam Spence
- 2005 - 2007 Scott Courtice
- 2007 - 2008 Chris Locke
- 2008 - 2009 Howie Bender
- 2009 - 2011 Alexi White
- 2011 – 2012 Sam Andrey
- 2012 - 2013 Rylan Kinnon
- 2014 – 2015 Sean Madden
- 2015 – 2017 Zachary Rose
- 2017 – 2018 Sophie Helpard
- 2019 – 2022 Eddy Avila
- 2023– 2026 Malika Dhanani
- 2026- Present Octave Andrade-Dixon

== See also ==
- College Student Alliance
- Undergraduates of Canadian Research Intensive Universities
