= College Student Alliance =

Canadian advocacy organization

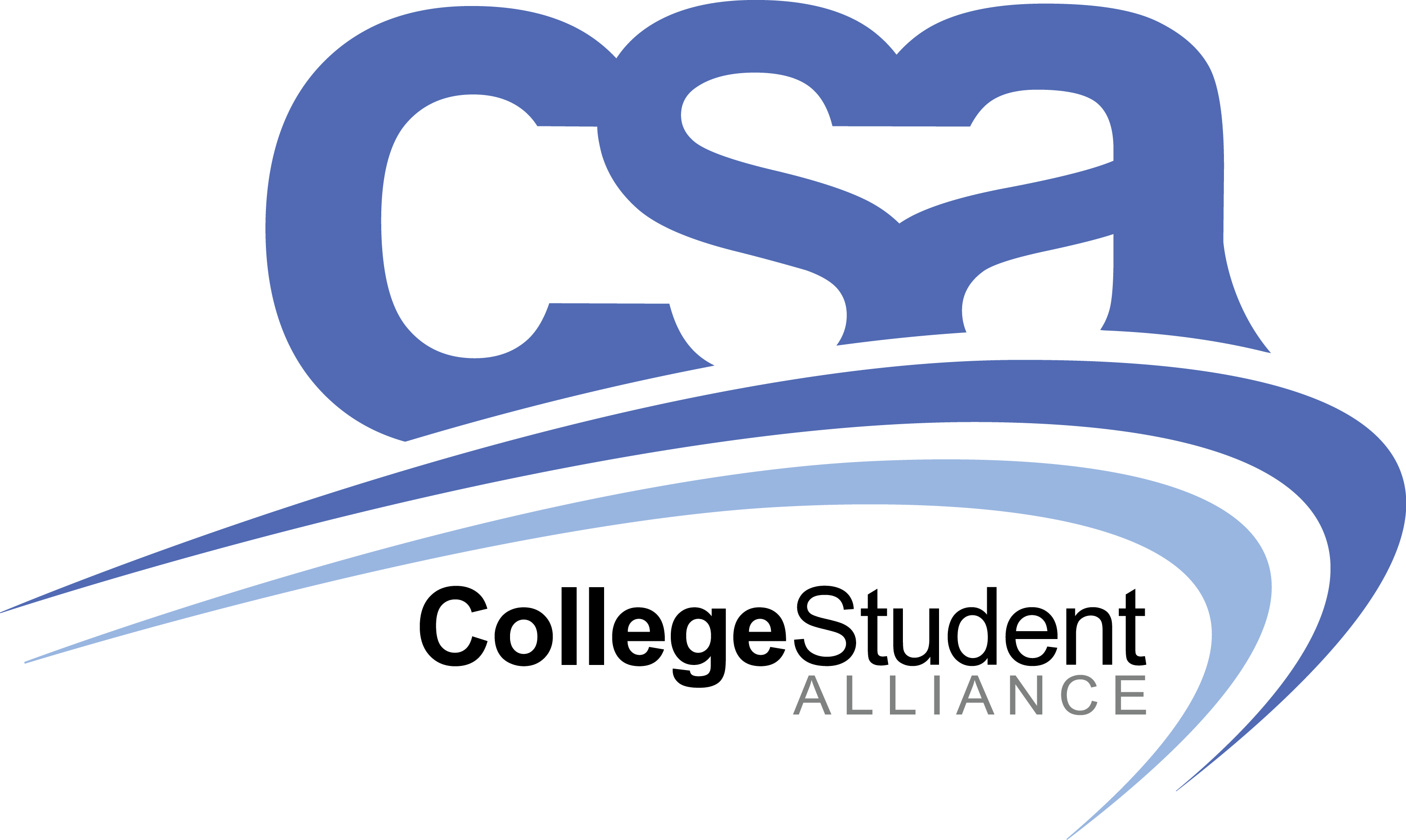
- Location: Toronto. Ontario, Canada
- Established: 1975
- President: Azi Afousi
- Vice president: -
- Affiliations: OUSA, CASA
- Website: www.collegestudentalliance.ca

The College Student Alliance (CSA) is a provincial advocacy organization in Ontario that represents students attending community colleges. The alliance represents 3 colleges and 5student associations with over 39,000 student members.

Founded in 1975 as the Ontario Community College Student Parliamentary Association (OCCSPA), the College Student Alliance (CSA) is an advocacy and student leadership organization which serves Ontario's college students.

CSA's main competencies are advocacy related on behalf of its membership on all issues relating to college education including tuition, accessibility, quality and transferability. Independent of any political or organizational affiliations the CSA is dedicated to championing the needs of Ontario postsecondary students from the students' perspective.

== Board of directors ==
The board of directors are elected by the membership to oversee the organization, provide guidance and future vision. All members of the board must be current student leaders from within the membership.

The 2022–2023 board of directors are:

Title	Name	Student association
President	Azi Afousi	Humber College
Vice president	Aksnoor Singh Kamboj	Humber College
Director	Jasmine Bates	Humber College

== Staff ==
- General Manager | David Ward
- Policy & Advocacy Lead | Delaney Groves
- Office manager | Brenda Leciuk

== Presidents ==
- 2001-2002 | Thyagi DeLanerolle
- 2002–2003 | Jon Olinski
- 2003–2004 | Valerie Rothlin
- 2004–2005 | Justin Falconer
- 2005–2006 | Matt Jackson
- 2006–2007 | Matt Jackson
- 2007–2008 | Tyler Wiles
- 2008–2009 | Jennifer Howarth
- 2009–2010 | Justin Fox
- 2010–2011 | Justin Fox
- 2011–2012 | Brian Costantini
- 2012–2013 | Ciara Bryne
- 2013–2014 | Curtis Bell
- 2014–2015 | Matt Stewart
- 2015–2016 | Jeff Scherer
- 2016–2017 | Madison Schell
- 2017–2018 | Joel Willett/Aimee Calma
- 2018–2019 | Brittany Elizabeth Greig
- 2019–2021 | Tori Arnett
- 2021–2022 | Eli Ridder
- 2022–2024 | Azi Afousi

== Executive directors/general managers ==
- 1993-1996 Heather Russell
- 1996-1999 | Cynthia Watt
- 1999–2001 | Tracy Boyer
- 2002 | Thyagi DeLanerolle
- 2003 | Jon Olinski
- 2004–2005 | Frank Cappadocia
- 2005 | Jon Olinski
- 2005–2016 | Ted Bartlett
- 2016–2018 | Jennifer Nguyen (Howarth)
- 2018–2019 | Curtis Bell
- 2020–2022 | Jason Baryluk
- 2023-Present | David Ward
