= College of the Rockies =

Public community college in Cranbrook, British Columbia, Canada

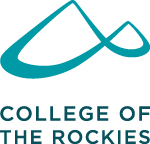
- Motto: Ad culmina (Latin)
- Motto in English: To the summits
- Type: Public community college
- Established: May 8, 1975; 51 years ago
- Affiliations: CICan, CCAA, AASHE
- Chair: Jared Basil
- President: Michael Crowe
- Students: 1,616 (2024-25 FTE)
- Postgraduates: Global Studies Certificate
- Location: Creston, Fernie, Golden, Invermere, Kimberley and Cranbrook, British Columbia, Canada
- Campus: urban/suburban/rural
- Colours: Blue & Green
- Nickname: Avalanche
- Mascot: Avalanche
- Website: cotr.bc.ca

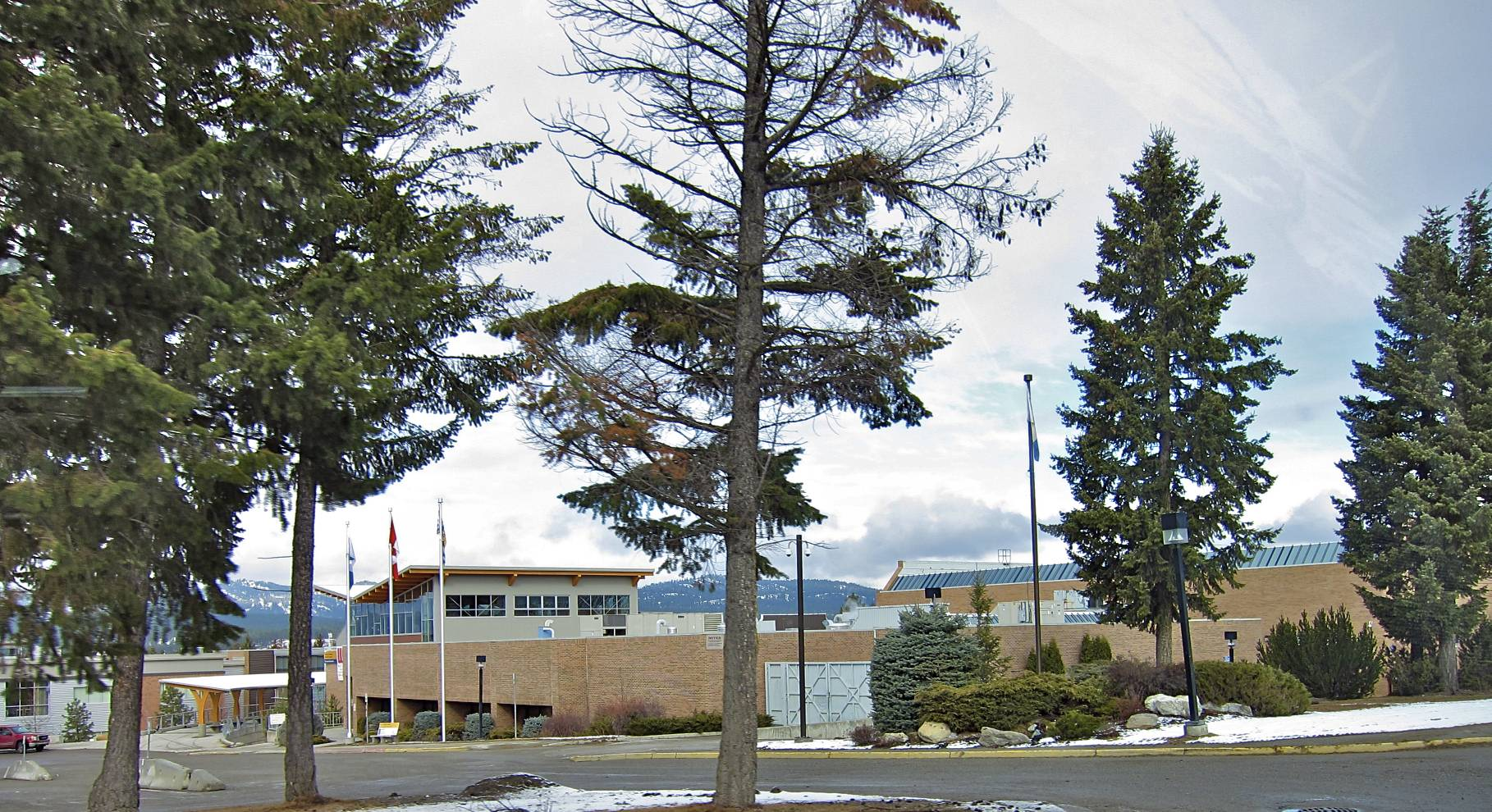
College of the Rockies, 2011

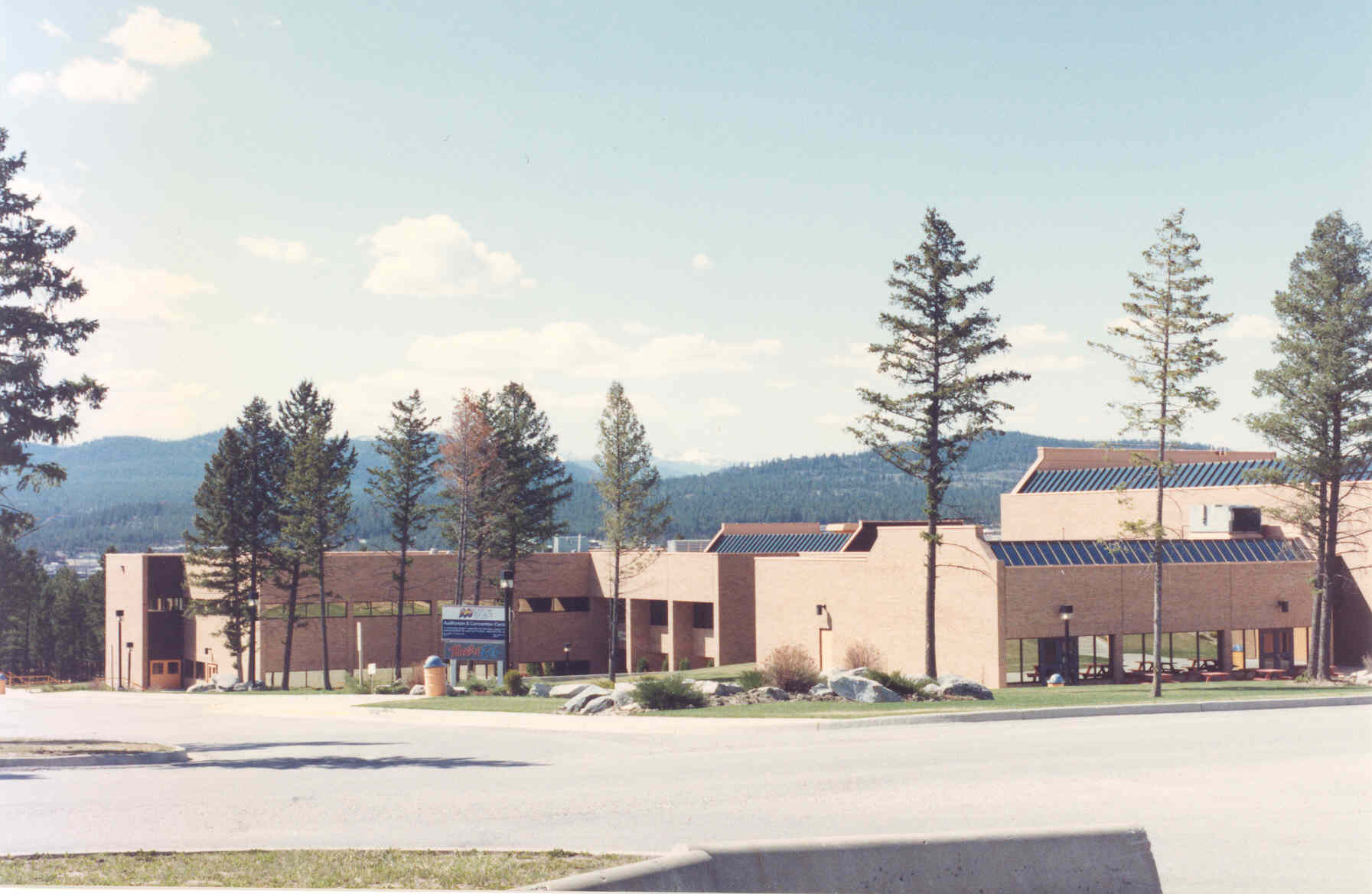
East Kootenay Community College, 1989

The College of the Rockies is a Canadian public community college, located in the southeast corner of British Columbia, Canada. The main campus is in Cranbrook, with regional campuses in Creston, Fernie, Golden, Invermere, and Kimberley.

== Programs ==
The college offers a full range of programs – both in-class and online – in the areas of university studies, adult basic education, health, child youth and family studies, administrative studies, tourism, computer technology, fire services, and trades.

On June 16, 2010, the College announced its first four-year degree program, the Bachelor of Business Administration in Sustainable Business Practices. This announcement marked a significant milestone in the 35 year development of College of the Rockies.

== Location ==
The college serves a regional population of approximately 82,700 people who live within a large 45,000 square kilometre area. The region, known as the Rocky Mountain Trench, features high mountain ranges separated by ecologically significant valleys and water systems.

== History ==
=== 1970s ===
Recognizing the need for apprenticeship training, in 1971, James Patterson, a hard rock miner in the Sullivan Mine in Kimberley, BC and member of the local School Board, initiated the process of establishing a local vocational school.

East Kootenay Community College was established on May 8, 1975 with an edict from the government that the main campus be constructed in Cranbrook. The number of registered students that first year was 351 in Cranbrook, 64 in Kimberley, 52 in Fernie, 39 in Golden and 37 in Invermere.

Funding for a $1.4 million College campus building was announced in February 1978. Sod turning for the facility took place in April 1980. While the new campus building was being constructed, the college operated out of 17 different locations in Cranbrook.

=== 1980s ===
The official opening of the Cranbrook Campus took place September 20, 1982, and within the decade new facilities were also completed for the Invermere Campus (March 1988) and the Fernie Campus (October 1989).

=== 1990s ===
The College's expansion continued during the 1990s, with new campus buildings for Golden (May 1992), and Creston (May 1995), and the addition of over 30,000 square feet (2,800 m^{2}) to the Cranbrook Campus to house a Health wing, Professional Cook Training facilities, and a Mechanics shop.

Associate Degrees in Arts and Sciences were offered for the first time in the 1993 academic year, and the Purcell House student residence was completed in 1995.

In 1995 East Kootenay Community College changed its name to College of the Rockies (COTR). COTR's first online course, Applied Research Methods, was offered in January 1997.

In 1997/98, the College introduced the Avalanche men's and women's volleyball teams as the latest members of the BC Colleges' Athletics Association.

The trade-mark with the words 'College of the Rockies' was filed in 1997.

=== 21st century ===
College of the Rockies' Arms were registered with the Canadian Heraldic Authority on March 1, 2000.

A new childcare facility, Kids on Campus, was completed in October 2002. In November 2004, a wireless network for student laptops was introduced at the Cranbrook Campus.

In 2007, the Cranbrook Campus completed a $16.2 million (CDN) expansion, with a new Academic building and a new Trades facility.

In 2009, COTR was granted $12.7 million (CDN) from the Federal and Provincial governments as part of the Knowledge Infrastructure Program, in order to expand and upgrade buildings at the Cranbrook campus. This project was completed ahead of schedule in October, 2010. View video of grand opening

In 2025, following program cuts and an elevated turnover in college management, a notice regarding rights of terminated employees was published.

== Student population ==
In the 2020/2021 instructional year, College of the Rockies served 1,446 full-time equivalent students.

== Scholarships and bursaries ==
The Government of Canada sponsors an Aboriginal Bursaries Search Tool that lists over 680 scholarships, bursaries, and other incentives offered by governments, universities, and industry to support Aboriginal post-secondary participation. College of the Rockies offers numerous scholarships for Aboriginal, First Nations and Métis students.

== Economic impact ==
A 2007 study found that College of the Rockies has a significant economic impact on its college region.

- Students receive a 13% annual return on their investment of time and money.
- For every $1 the students invest in COTR, they receive a cumulative of $2.40 in higher future earnings over the course of their working careers (after discounting).
- Taxpayers see a real money return of 21% on their annual investments in COTR.
- The Province of British Columbia benefits from improved health and reduced welfare, unemployment, and crime, saving the public some $649,800 per year each year that students are in the workforce.
- The COTR Service Area economy receives roughly $133.8 million in income each year due to the annual activities of COTR and the cumulative effects of its past students. This figure amounts to 4.3% of total income in the regional economy.

== See also ==
- List of institutes and colleges in British Columbia
- List of universities in British Columbia
- Higher education in British Columbia
- Education in Canada
