= Columbia College (British Columbia) =

Two-year liberal arts institution in Vancouver

- Motto: Spring Into Your Future
- Type: Private university transfer college
- Established: 1936
- Academic affiliations: CICan
- Principal: Robin Hemmingsen
- Students: 2100
- Location: Vancouver, British Columbia, Canada; 49°16′18″N 123°5′43″W
- Campus: Urban
- Colours: blue orange white
- Sporting affiliations: CCAA
- Mascot: Trevor the Bear
- Website: www.columbiacollege.ca

Columbia College is an independent not-for-profit two-year university transfer college located in Vancouver, British Columbia, Canada. The college is a registered charity and an incorporated Society composed of all Columbia College employees.

Columbia College has thousands of students enrolled from 61 countries around the world. A variety of first and second-year university-level courses are offered to students to complete a Columbia College associate degree and a University Transfer program is offered to students who successfully completed Senior High School. Courses offered in college are transferable to universities within and outside of the province. Moreover, the college provides a High School program and an English for Academic Purposes program which is accredited by Languages Canada.

== History ==
Founded in 1936, Columbia College first offered high school completion programs to hundreds of students. In 1965 the college added university transfer courses to its offerings, and in the 1970s introduced English as a Second Language Program to meet the needs of the increasing number of international students.

In 1985 Columbia College moved from downtown Vancouver to Burnaby, to a location near Metrotown Centre. Over the next twelve years the college's programs expanded significantly; in particular, the college broadened its offerings in the areas of business and engineering. During this period Columbia College established its reputation as Canada's premier university-preparatory school for international students.

In 1997 Columbia College returned to a downtown Vancouver location to share a new facility with the British Columbia Institute of Technology (BCIT) at the corner of Seymour and Dunsmuir street. In this building (the BCIT Downtown Campus) the college was able to provide improved science laboratories and classrooms, and expanded library facilities, as well as a refurbished Tutorial Centre.

In 2004, Columbia College became the first private institution in the province to award Associate of Arts and Associate of Science degrees. Enrolment further increased and the requirements of the student population changed. The college now employs a Regulated International Student Immigration Advisor (RISIA) to support students with immigration issues and questions.

In 2011, Columbia College started to recruit significant numbers of students from around the globe. While Columbia continued to recruit students in its traditional areas in East Asia, the college saw an influx of students from South Asia, the Middle East, and West Africa.

In April 2013 Columbia College moved from its downtown location to a new five-storey building just east of Vancouver's downtown core on 438 Terminal Avenue. The new building, known as the Main Campus, provides science laboratories (Biology, Chemistry, Computer Science, and Physics), library, and student lounges.

Since 2016, Columbia College has offered refugee bursaries. In 2018, Columbia College added an additional five bursaries to internal refugee applicants. Students who are refugees have the opportunity to complete their high school education in Canada or to pursue an associate degree at no cost to them.

In September 2017, Columbia College opened an additional campus known as the North Campus. The building is located at 333 Terminal Ave just across the Main Campus. Columbia College's English for Academic Purposes and High School programs are offered at the North Campus and students keep access to the new facility while retaining access to all the facilities at the Main Campus.

In 2020, in response to pandemic-related challenges to international study, the college implemented a set of student assistance programs, allowing continuing students to complete their coursework via distance education.

In 2026, the members of the society voted to merge with Quest University. The college then terminated over half of its faculty and administration.

Columbia College is registered as a society under the Societies Act of BC and as a charity with the Canadian Revenue Agency. The college currently has an enrolment of about 2,100 students drawn from 61 countries.

== Programs ==
Columbia College offers:

=== University Transfer Program ===
The University Transfer Programs offered by Columbia College allow students to take their first and second-year university-level studies in the more personal atmosphere of a smaller college before transferring to second or third year at a university.

Transfer credit is pre-arranged for university courses completed at Columbia College with local universities such as the University of British Columbia, Simon Fraser University and the University of Victoria. It is customary for other universities in BC and the United States to recognize the transfer credits listed by the British Columbia Commission on Admissions and Transfer, BCCAT.

=== Associate degrees program ===
An associate degree is equivalent to the first two years of a four-year university degree. With an associate degree, students can enter into the third year of a university's bachelor's degree program.

ASSOCIATE OF ARTS DEGREES	ASSOCIATE OF SCIENCE DEGREES
Business Administration	Computer Science
Economics	General Science
General Arts	Mathematics
Mass Communication	
Political Science	
Psychology	

=== Associate of Arts Degree ===
Students in this program complete 20 courses at the first and second-year levels, including:

- Two courses in first-year English (one Composition course and one Literature course).
- Three courses in Mathematics/Science including at least one course in Mathematics, Computer Science or Statistics and one course in a laboratory Science.
- Twelve courses, including at least six at the second year level (in at least two different subject areas) in Social Sciences, Humanities and Arts. This must include two courses in Social Sciences, two courses in Humanities other than English, and eight additional courses in Arts.
- Three courses in Arts, Mathematics, Science or other areas.

=== Associate of Science degree ===
Students in this program complete 20 courses at the first and second-year levels, including:

- Two courses in first year English (one Composition course and one Literature course).
- Two courses in Mathematics including at least one course in Calculus.
- Twelve courses, including at least six at the second-year level (in at least two different subject areas) in Science including at least one course in a Laboratory Science.
- Two courses in Arts other than English.
- Two courses in Arts, Science or other areas.

=== Grade 10–12 University Foundation Program ===
University Foundation Programs are available to high school level students who wish to enrol in university but lack the prerequisites to do so. There are five distinct foundation options, and, while only completion of the Senior Secondary Program will allow a student to be eligible for direct entry to university, completion of any of the options listed below will allow a student to enter the University Transfer Program at Columbia College, provided the minimum grade requirements are achieved.

==== There are four programs available ====
- Senior Secondary (grade 10, 11, 12)
- Accelerated Secondary (grade 11 and 12)
- Adult Secondary (grade 11 and 12)
- University Preparatory

=== English for Academic Purposes Program ===
The English for Academic Purposes Program provides English instruction for two types of students:

- Students who have been accepted into an Academic Program but whose English skills are deemed insufficient
- Students wanting an academic environment in which to learn English

There are four levels in which students may be placed based on their performance on assessment or placement tests. Students may begin their program at the beginning of any semester or any mid-semester entry point.

=== Limitless: Annual International Student Conference ===
Limitless is Columbia College's annual academic conference where students present their research to the community. Previous keynotes speakers include CBC Vancouver News reporter Anita Bathe and Canadian mathematician and UBC professor of mathematics Malabika Pramanik.

=== Athletics clubs ===
- CC Basketball
- CC Dragonboat
- CC Tennis
- CC Soccer
- CC Badminton
- CC Martial Arts
- CC Swimming
- CC Table Tennis
- CC Cricket

=== Interest clubs ===
- CCSA (Columbia College Student Association)
- CC Anime
- CC Bowling
- CC Clean Club
- CC Entrepreneur
- CC Gay-Straight Alliance
- CC Indian Cultural Club
- CC Journalism
- CC Knitting
- CC Media Club
- CC North Campus Student Council
- CC Students for the Planet
- CC TED Talks
- CC Creative Writing Club (which publishes a magazine called "438")

== Student services ==
- Homestay
- Health Services (first aid room and nurse)
- Frequently Asked Questions for Future Students
- Career Services

== See also ==
- List of institutes and colleges in British Columbia
- List of universities in British Columbia
- Higher education in British Columbia
- Education in Canada
