= North Island College =

Public college in British Columbia, Canada

- Type: Public
- Established: 1975
- Affiliations: CICan, BC Colleges
- Chairperson: Patricia Trasolini
- President: Lisa Domae
- Administrative staff: 400+
- Students: 1,354 (2024-25 FTE)
- Location: Courtenay, Campbell River, Port Alberni, and Port Hardy, British Columbia, Canada
- Campus: Suburban
- Colours: Ocean, Sun and Spruce
- Website: www.nic.bc.ca

North Island College is a public college with multiple campuses spread across Vancouver Island, British Columbia, Canada.

== History ==
North Island College reduced staff and announced the closure of their Ucluelet campus in 2025.

== See also ==
- List of institutes and colleges in British Columbia
- List of universities in British Columbia
- Higher education in British Columbia
- Education in Canada
