= The Westcoast Reader =

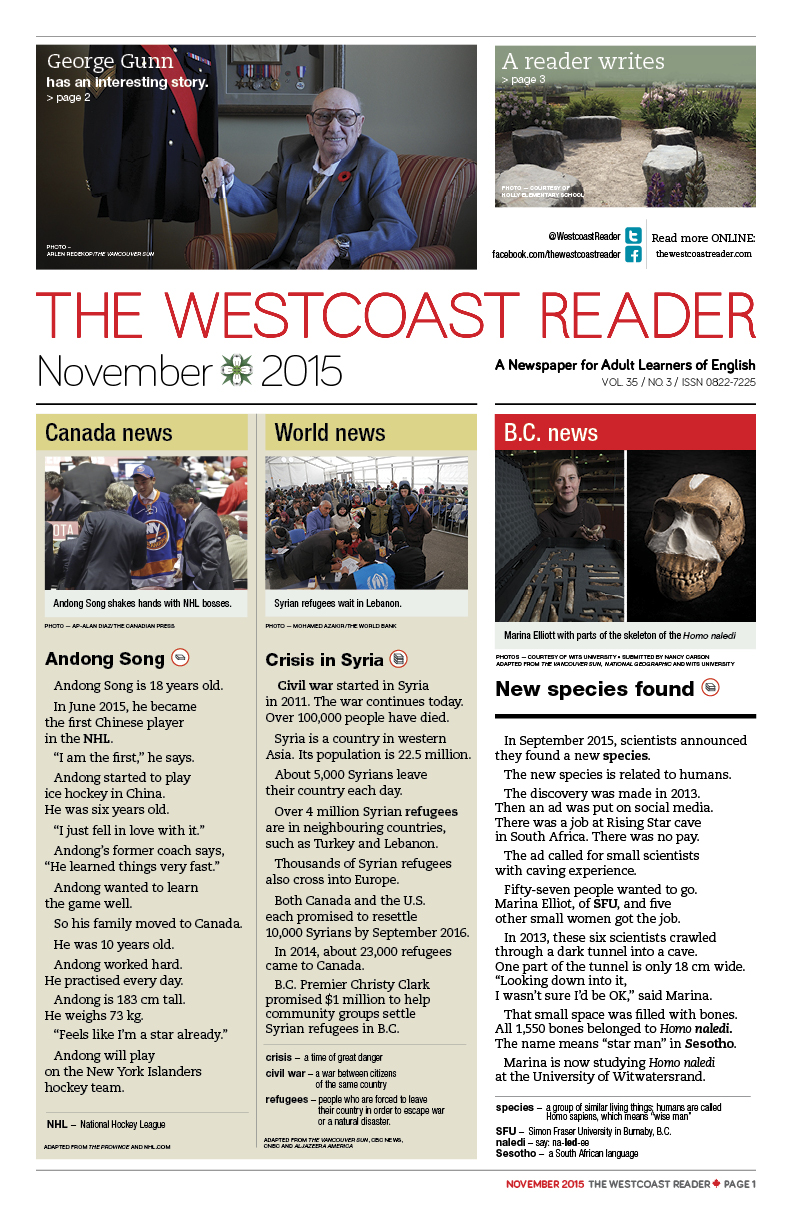
Front page of The Westcoast Reader November 2015 issue

The Westcoast Reader is a literacy newspaper for beginning adult readers in British Columbia, Canada. Its purpose is to help English as a second language (ESL) and adult literacy learners develop reading and language skills, while providing interesting and relevant information with an adult focus.

Local, national and international news stories are adapted from newspapers like The Vancouver Sun and The Province for use in The Westcoast Reader. The newspaper also provides information on a variety of topics including health, safety, law, government services and everyday life.

The newspaper is published 10 times per year (from September to June).

Articles in the newspaper are written at three levels of difficulty, providing entry points to reading for a variety of learners (from elementary school students to senior citizens). The province of British Columbia considers the newspaper to be an introduction to Canadian daily newspapers, as well as an orientation for immigrants to aspects of Canadian life and culture.

The newspaper has an estimated readership of 125,000 in 300 B.C. communities.

Funding for The Westcoast Reader is provided by the BC Ministry of Advanced Education and paying subscribers.

Decoda Literacy Solutions and Camosun College in Victoria are partners managing the publication.
