= Langara College =

College in Vancouver, Canada

Langara College snəw̓eyəɬ leləm
- Motto: Latin: Eruditio Libertas Est
- Motto in English: Knowledge is Freedom
- Type: Public
- Established: April 1, 1994; 32 years ago
- Academic affiliations: CICan, CBIE, CUP
- Chair: Scott Murray
- President: Paula Burns
- Provost: David Anderson (Interim)
- Students: 6,065 FTE (2024–25 FTE)
- Location: Vancouver, British Columbia, Canada; 49°13′30″N 123°6′30″W
- Campus: Urban
- Colours: Orange, black, white
- Nickname: Langara Falcons
- Sporting affiliations: PACWEST, CCAA
- Mascot: Falcon
- Website: langara.ca

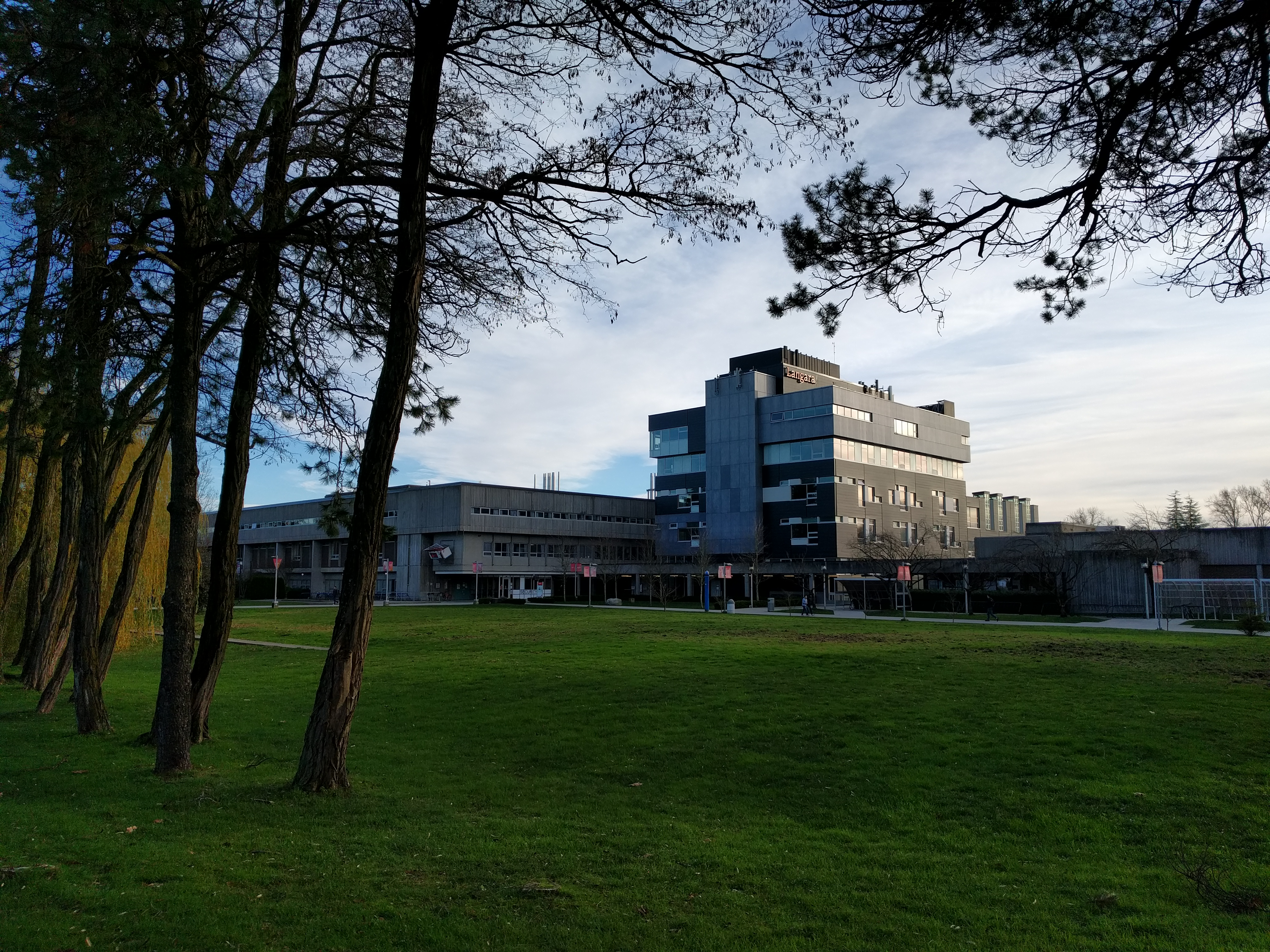
Langara College

Langara College (snəw̓eyəɬ leləm̓ in Halkomelem) is a public degree-granting college in Vancouver, British Columbia, Canada. Langara College started in 1965 as part of Vancouver City College and in 1970, it opened its West 49th Avenue campus. On April 1, 1994, Langara College was established as an independent public college under the Provincial College and Institute Act. The College is also known as snəw̓eyəɬ leləm̓, house of teachings, a name given to the college by the Musqueam First Nation.

Langara is a post-secondary institution that provides University Studies, Career Studies, and Continuing Studies programs and courses. The college takes its name from the neighbourhood in which it is situated, which was named after Spanish Admiral Juan de Lángara.

== History ==
Langara College courses and programs were first offered in 1965 at King Edward Centre as part of Vancouver City College. Since 1970, the current campus on West 49th Avenue has housed Langara's programs over 50 years, celebrating their 49th anniversary in 2019. On April 1, 1994, Langara College was established as an independent public college under the Provincial College and Institute Act. Langara College Continuing Studies was established in 1997. To provide more space, a new classroom and office building was opened in January 1997. The new library/classroom building was opened in September 2007. Langara College began the construction of the Science and Technology Building in 2013 as part of Phase II (of IV) of the Master Plan to upgrade and expand the campus. Construction was officially completed in September 2016.

In 2023 Langara graduate Balbir Singh was one of roughly 150 students who faced deportation due to entry to Canada beginning with a fake college acceptance letter.

First-year Langara international students were barred from using Greater Vancouver Food Bank in 2024.

Langara staff returned to mass layoffs in 2025 following reduced international enrolment. Layoffs at the college had begun earlier in the year. Faculty claimed in March that college leadership refused to respond to their claim 200 faculty had lost work.

== Name ==
The name is a reference to the neighbourhood the college is within, itself a reference to Juan de Lángara, as the area was charted by the Spanish navy.

Musqueam, whose unceded territory Langara currently occupies, gave the traditional name snəw̓eyəɬ leləm̓ meaning 'house of teachings' to the college in January 2016. snəw̓eyəɬ references advice given to children to guide them into adulthood and build their character. This is the first time that a British Columbia First Nation gave an Indigenous name to a public, post-secondary institution.

== Programs and courses ==
Programs and courses at Langara College are delivered in the following subject areas:

- Arts
- Business
- Health
- Humanities & Social Sciences
- Science & Technology

=== University studies ===
Langara College provides university-level programs and courses and offers a variety of qualifications, including baccalaureate degrees, associate degrees, diplomas, certificates, and citations. The three 4-year degree programs offered by the college are Nursing, Recreation Management, and Business Administration. Langara's wide range of academic programs in more than 60 subject areas are offered over three semesters per year. Langara is a popular choice for university transfer students due to smaller class sizes, excellent support services, and competitive tuition fees. More students transfer to BC universities from Langara College than from any other college in the province.

=== Career studies ===
Langara College offers career programs leading to one-year certificates, two-year diplomas, and four-year bachelor's degrees in fields that lead to careers in business, industry, community services, bioinformatics and the arts. Although some of Langara's career programs require that students complete the program within a specific time period, many of the programs can be completed on a part-time basis.

=== Continuing studies ===
Langara College's Continuing Studies department offers over 700 courses and 35 certificate programs year-round. The department's strategic objective is to provide lifelong learning opportunities to meet the individual needs of students.

== Studio 58 ==
Studio 58, Langara College's Theatre Arts Program offers professional theatre training for actors and production personnel. The school auditions hundreds of people across Canada but only sixteen students are accepted per semester. The school has around 72 students for both its three-year acting program, and three-year production program. Studio 58 was led by Anthony Holland from 1965–1985; Kathryn Shaw from 1985–2020; Courtenay Dobbie from 2021-2023; and is currently led by Artistic Director Paul Moniz de Sá.

== Student media ==
Student media includes the newspaper The Voice, operated by the college's Journalism Program.

== Transportation ==
The 49 TransLink bus route runs to Langara; as well as the Langara–49th Avenue SkyTrain station provides rapid transit access to the campus.

== Notable alumni ==
- Alison Acheson, author
- George Affleck, journalist, politician, entrepreneur
- Carmen Aguirre, actress
- Scott Bellis, actor and director
- Daniel Doheny, actor
- Ujjal Dosanjh, politician
- Joey Haywood, basketball player
- Adrian Holmes, actor
- Wanda John-Kehewin, author and poet
- Catherine Kallin, theoretical physicist
- Gary Mason, journalist
- Andrew McNee, actor
- Colin Mochrie, actor
- Kristi Pinderi, LGBT rights activist
- Sam Sullivan, politician
- Hudson Williams, actor

== See also ==
- List of colleges in British Columbia
- List of universities in British Columbia
- Higher education in British Columbia
- Education in Canada
