= College of New Caledonia =

College in British Columbia, Canada

- Motto: Toujours la Verite (The Truth Always)
- Type: Public Community College
- Established: 1969; 57 years ago
- Affiliations: CICan, CCAA, CBIE.
- Endowment: $44,940,000
- President: Cindy Heitman
- Dean: Ward Cartier, Robert Lewis, Wendy Male, Amelia Merrick
- Administrative staff: 345 in 2012
- Students: 1,506 (2024-25 FTE)
- Location: British Columbia, Canada
- Campus: urban/suburban/rural Prince George, Quesnel, Mackenzie, "Lakes District" in Burns Lake, and "Nechako" in Fort St. James, Fraser Lake and Vanderhoof.
- Colours: Red and dark grey
- Website: cnc.bc.ca

The College of New Caledonia (CNC) is a post-secondary educational institution that serves the residents of the Central Interior of British Columbia. CNC operates six campuses in Prince George, Burns Lake, Fort St. James, Mackenzie, Quesnel and Vanderhoof.

CNC offers small class sizes, not in excess of 37 students, as mandated by their faculty agreement.

During the 2022-23 year, CNC had 6,610 students, with 5,135 domestic and 1,475 international students. Out of all full-time equivalent (FTE) students, roughly 40% were international in 2023-2024. Changes in Canadian immigration rules for international students will lead to an expected decline in 2024-25 according to College presidents.

== History ==
The college was established in Prince George, British Columbia, Canada in 1969 as a successor to the B.C. Vocational School. The college was called "New Caledonia," a name given to the region by the early explorer, Simon Fraser. The first convocation of 37 graduates took place in 1971. CNC has since expanded by opening up campuses across central British Columbia.

The College of New Caledonia's Arms, Supporters, Flag and Badge were registered with the Canadian Heraldic Authority on June 4, 1996.

== Campuses ==
=== Prince George ===
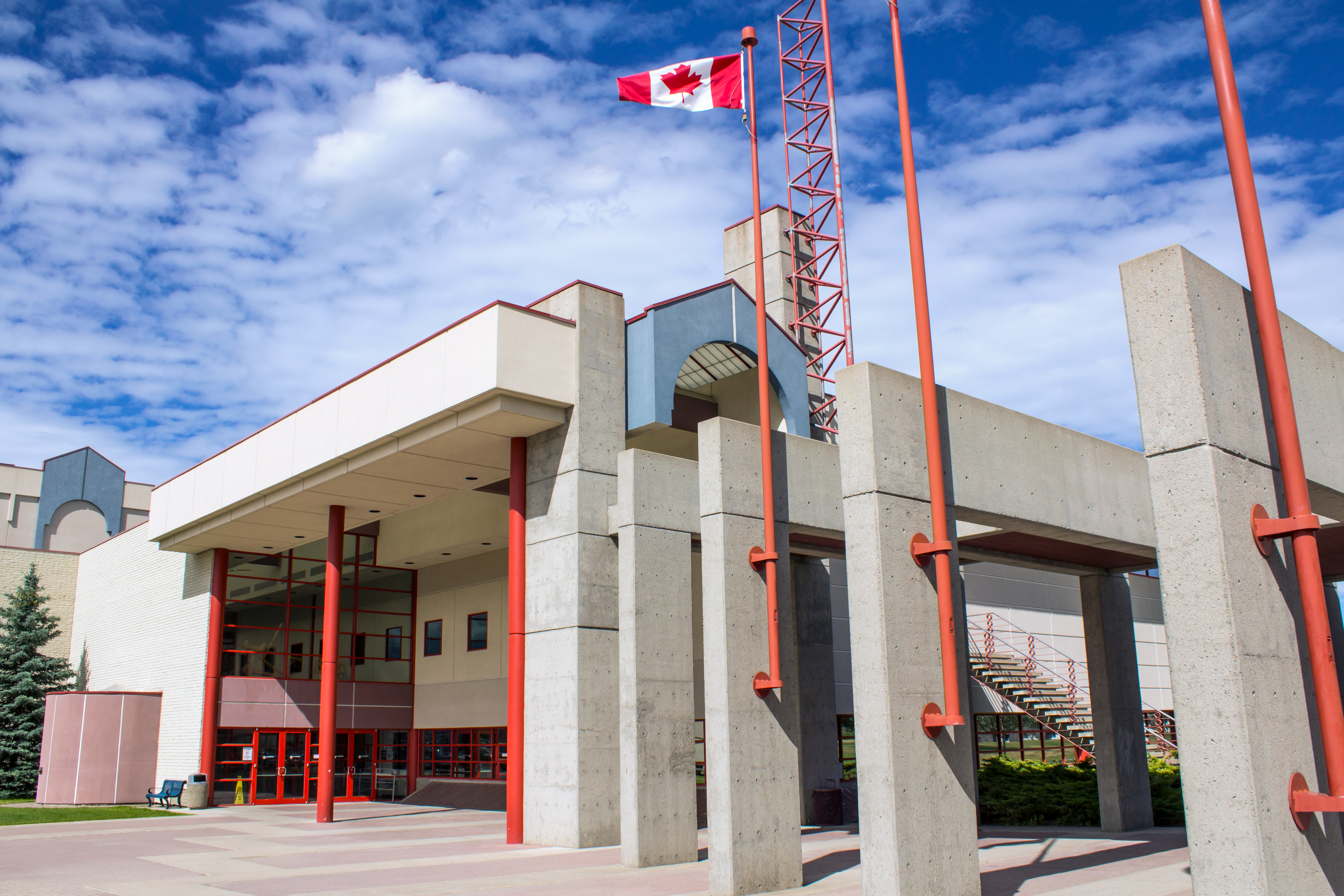
CNC Prince George main building

CNC in Prince George occupies four buildings: the main campus, Technical Education Centre, Nicholson campus, and the John A. Brink Trades & Technology Centre. The Prince George campus's recreation department provides a full-size gym, weight room, bouldering wall, squash courts, and yoga classes. These services are free to attending students. The Prince George campus is also the headquarters of the CNC Students' Union.

CNC's Dental Assisting and Dental Hygiene programs are accredited by The Commission on Dental Accreditation of Canada. As of 2014, graduates of both programs have had a 100% pass rate on the National Dental Assisting Examining Board exam.

=== Quesnel ===
The Quesnel campus is located at 100 Campus Way, Quesnel, B.C. In 2011, construction began on an additional building meant to provide trades and technical training services. The completed building was officially named the West Fraser Tech Centre in 2013. The building, designed by Office of McFarlane Biggar Architects and Designers, earned the Governor General's Award for Architecture in 2012, and is home to trades students in programs such as machinist/millwright, carpentry, electrical, plumbing and power engineering. The campus opened an expanded Nursing Lab in 2024.

=== Lakes District ===
CNC's Lakes District campus in Burns Lake is located at 545 Highway 16 West. It has offered a variety of community-focused educational programs since 1976. The campus has gained worldwide attention for its work in the area of Fetal Alcohol Spectrum Disorder. The campus has experienced enrolment challenges in the past. The college has been called out for refusing to release FTE (full-time equivalent) student numbers. The campus saw a rise in enrolment in 2017 as international enrolment grew.

=== Mackenzie ===
The college operates a campus in Mackenzie offering academic, vocational, professional development, and general interest courses and programs. They also operate the Mackenzie WorkBC Employment Services Centre in partnership with the government of British Columbia.

=== Nechako ===
The Nechako region is served by campuses in Fort St. James and Vanderhoof. The Fort St James campus is located at 179 Douglas Avenue. The campus Aboriginal Services Plan hosted artist Roy Vickers in 2016. The Vanderhoof campus located at 195 1 St, hired Nicholette Prince of the Nak’azdli Whut’en First Nation as campus principal in 2016.

== Partnerships ==
Credits can be transferred to University of British Columbia, Simon Fraser University, University of Victoria, Thompson Rivers University, University of Northern British Columbia, and Royal Roads University toward a four-year degree.

The College of New Caledonia and the Emily Carr University of Art and Design have created a Fine Arts program. Students can take basic first year courses at the CNC campus in Prince George, then transfer to the Emily Carr campus in Vancouver for the final three years.

== Gallery ==
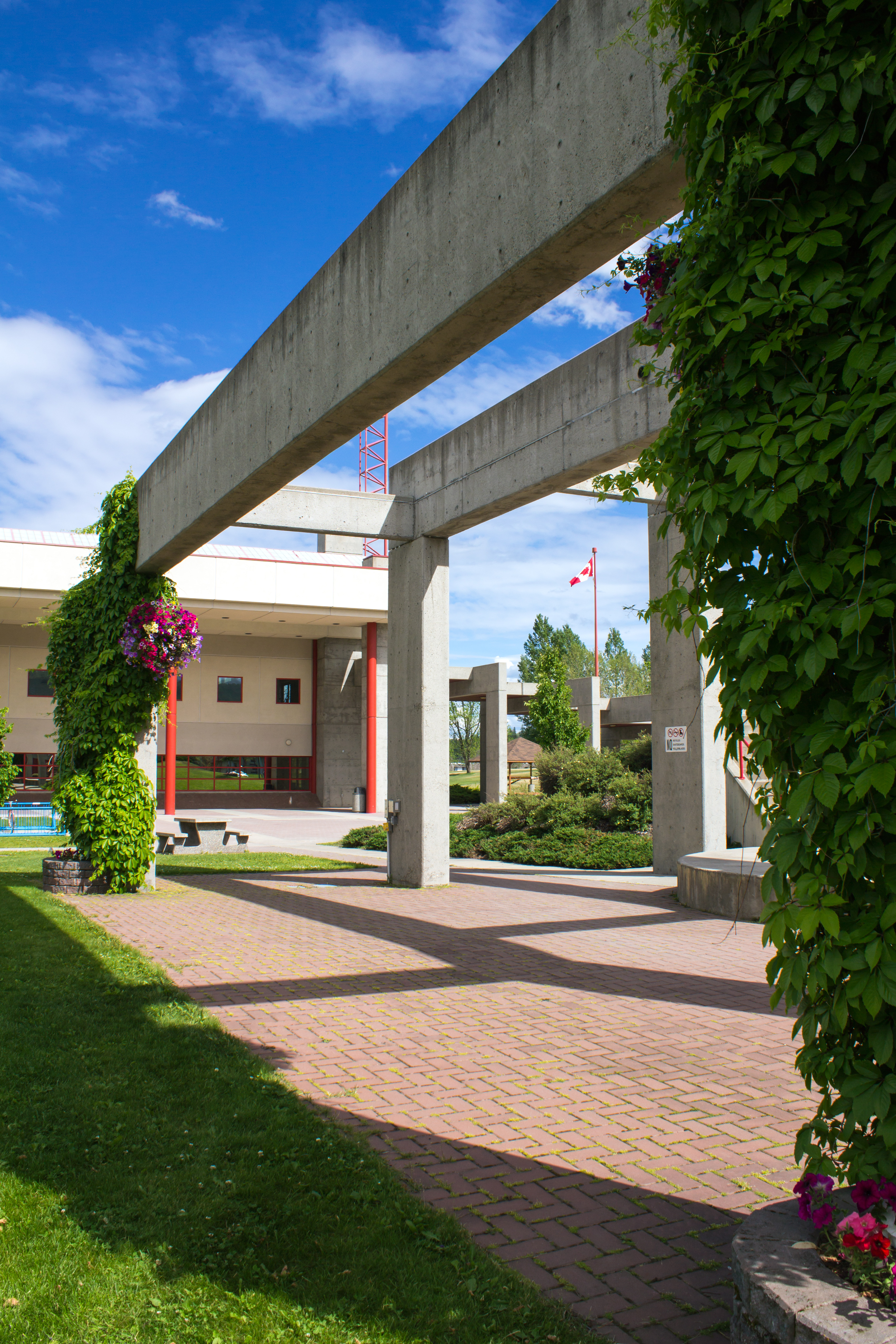
Courtyard of the CNC main building in Prince George

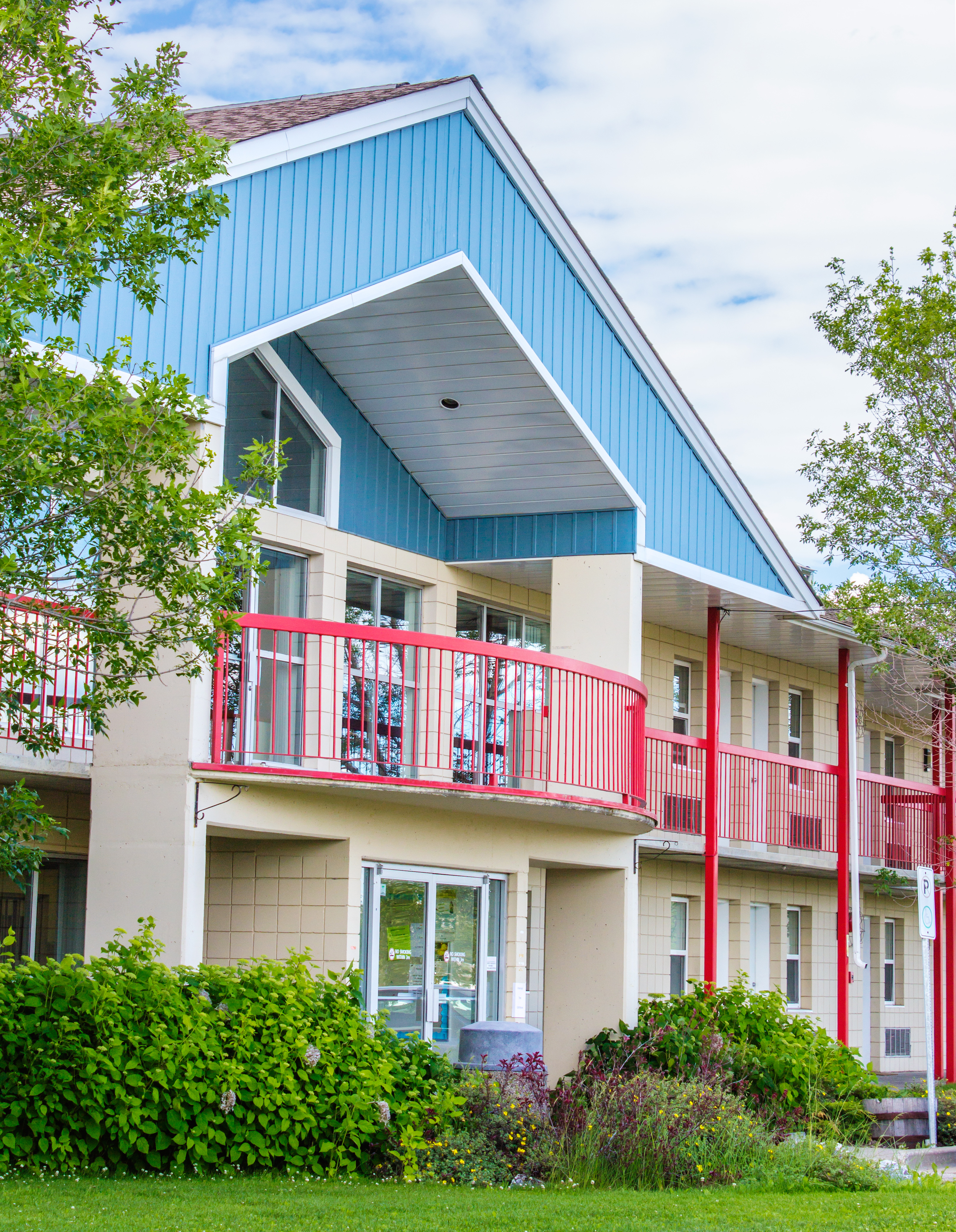
Entrance to the CNC student residence

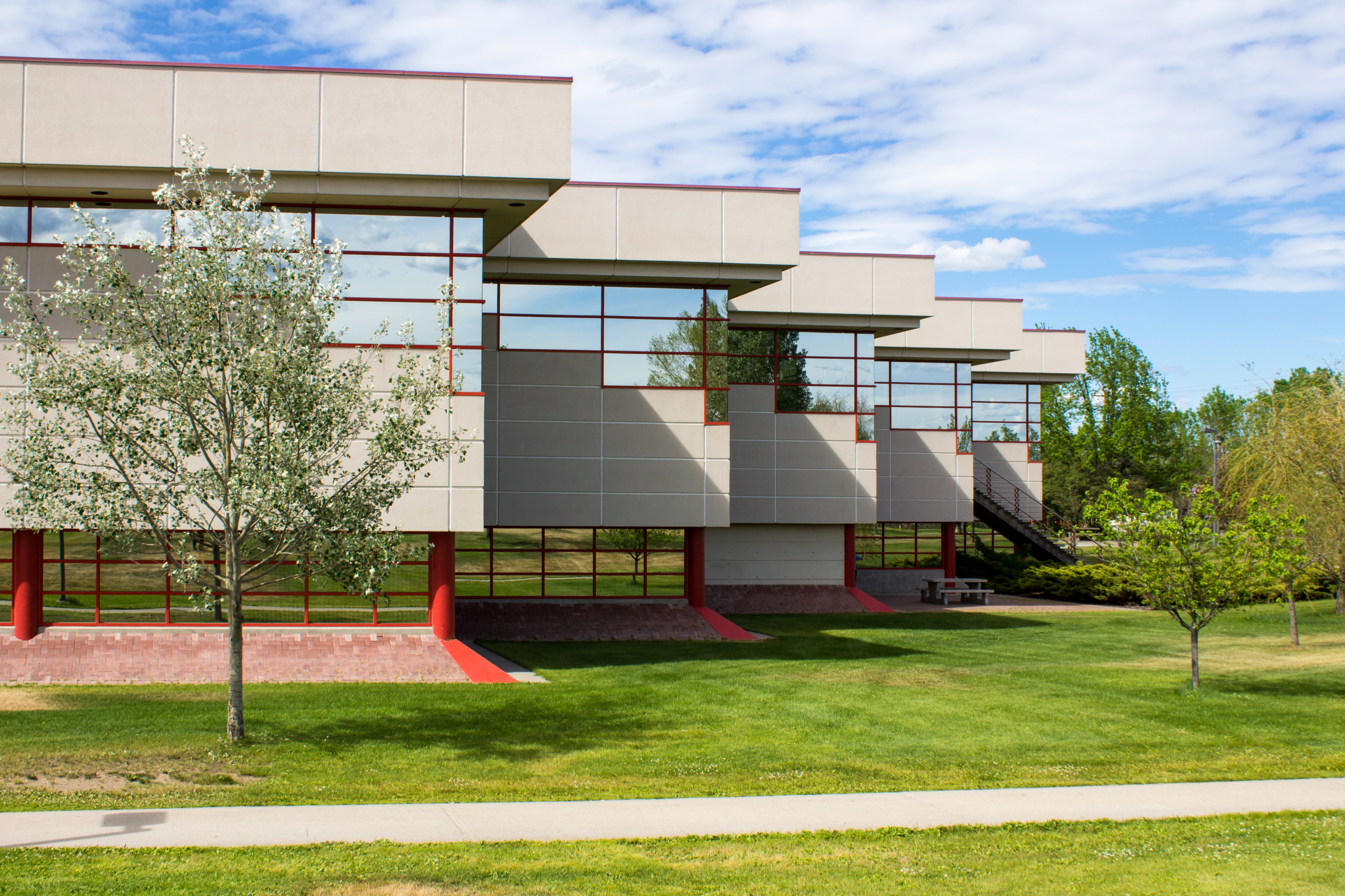
CNC library building in Prince George

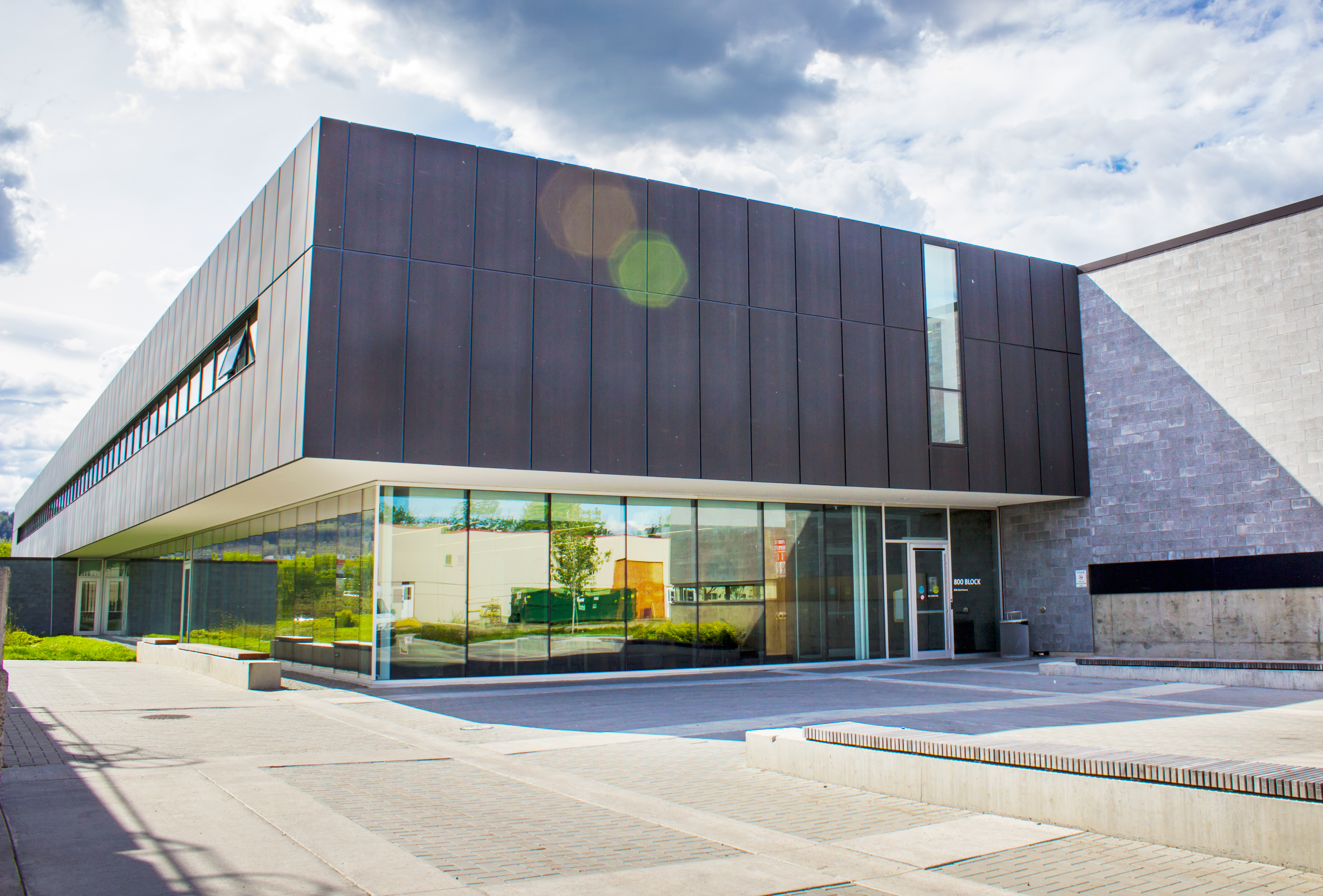
CNC Technical Education Centre in Prince George

== See also ==
- List of institutes and colleges in British Columbia
- List of universities in British Columbia
