= List of colleges in British Columbia =

Colleges in British Columbia include several types of educational institutions. In Canada, College generally means a career-oriented post-secondary institution that provides vocational training or education in applied arts, applied technology and applied science. There are 14 public funded colleges and institutes in British Columbia.

In addition to these publicly funded institutions, several privately funded post-secondary institutions use the term college in their names or to describe themselves. This includes private training institutions, theological colleges, and First Nations-controlled post-secondary institutions.

== Public institutions ==
There are 14 public institutions governed under the provincial College and Institute Act. Under the Act, these institutions are authorized to grant certificates, diplomas, and associate degrees. These institutions may also be designated to grant other degrees through ministerial order from a provincial minister.

=== Colleges ===
There are 11 public colleges in British Columbia. In addition to certificates, diplomas, and associate degrees, these 11 public colleges may also grant applied baccalaureates if they received the authorization to do so from a provincial minister. These 11 public colleges include:

- Camosun College (Victoria, British Columbia)
- Coast Mountain College (Prince Rupert, Terrace, Smithers, Hazelton, and Haida Gwaii)
- College of New Caledonia (Prince George, Quesnel, Mackenzie, Vanderhoof, Fort St. James, and Burns Lake)
- College of the Rockies (Cranbrook, Golden, Invermere, Kimberley, Fernie, and Creston)
- Douglas College (New Westminster and Coquitlam)
- Langara College (Vancouver)
- North Island College (Campbell River, Comox Valley, Port Alberni, Port Hardy, and Ucluelet)
- Northern Lights College (Dawson Creek, Fort St. John, Chetwynd, Fort Nelson)
- Okanagan College (Kelowna, Vernon, Penticton, Salmon Arm, Revelstoke)
- Selkirk College (Castlegar, Nelson, Trail, Grand Forks, Kaslo, and Nakusp)
- Vancouver Community College (Vancouver)

=== Applied institutes ===
There are three public institutes in British Columbia. In addition to certificates, diplomas, and associate degrees, these three public institutes may also grant applied baccalaureates, bachelor's degrees, and applied master's degrees, if they received the authorization to do so from a provincial minister. These three public institutes include:

- British Columbia Institute of Technology
- Justice Institute of British Columbia
- Nicola Valley Institute of Technology

== Private training institutions ==
A private training institution is a private post-secondary vocational school that is accredited by the Private Training Institutions Branch of the Ministry of Post-Secondary Education and Future Skills. These types of institutions offer at least one career-related program, most of whom are regulated under the Private Training Act. As of 2023, there were 551 private training institutions based in British Columbia.

Not all private training institutions use the word college in its name, with many private training institutions opting to use the term academy instead.

A select list of private training institutions include:

- Columbia College
- Coquitlam College
- Educacentre College
- Pacific Link College
- Sprott Shaw College
- Stenberg College
- The Salvation Army War College
- VanArts
- Vancouver Film School

== First Nations-controlled institutions ==
As of 2023, there were 43 First-Nations controlled institutions that offer post-secondary courses in British Columbia. However, only four use the term college in their names. They include

- Chemainus Native College
- Heiltsuk College
- Native Education College
- Seabird College

== Theological colleges ==
Several theological colleges operate in British Columbia. These private post-secondary institutions are specialized to teach Christian scripture and theology, and were granted the authority to operate these specific types of degree and diploma program through provincial legislation. Several theological colleges use the term seminary in its name instead of college.

Theological colleges based in British Columbia include:

- Canadian Baptist Seminary
- Canadian Chinese School of Theology
- Carey Theological College
- Columbia Bible College
- Mennonite Brethren Biblical Seminary
- Millar College of the Bible
- Okanagan Bible College
- Pacific Life Bible College
- Northwest Baptist Seminary
- Regent College
- Seminary of Christ the King
- St. Mark's College
- Summit Pacific College
- Trinity Western University
- Vancouver School of Theology

== See also ==
- Higher education in British Columbia
- Higher education in Canada
- List of business schools in Canada
- List of colleges in Canada
- List of universities in Canada
