= Higher education in British Columbia =

Province of British Columbia

Higher education in British Columbia is delivered by 25 publicly funded institutions that are composed of eleven universities, eleven colleges, and three institutes. This is in addition to three private universities, five private colleges, and six theological colleges. There are also an extensive number of private career institutes and colleges. Over 297,000 students were enrolled in post-secondary institutions in British Columbia in the 2019-2020 academic year.

Each of the province's post-secondary institutions sets its own admission requirements. Generally, successful graduation from high school, with the required academic prerequisites, is needed for admission to programs. Special consideration may be given to mature applicants, Aboriginal peoples, and people with disabilities. Information about admissions and prerequisites is available from the registrar's office of each institution. ApplyBC.ca (formerly PASBC) was a system-wide application portal (developed by BCcampus, a publicly funded organization whose role is to support higher education by providing leadership in the use of Information and Communications Technology, that allows people to apply for admission.

In 2015, the Ministry of Advanced Education, Skills and Training (AEST) initiated a dialogue with the public post-secondary sector to explore a common online application platform for students applying to public post-secondary education in B.C., similar to those used in other jurisdictions. EducationPlannerBC has replaced ApplyBC.ca as the new common online application portal for Universities in British Columbia.

== History ==
=== Establishment and the first university in BC (1890 – 1929) ===
Higher education in British Columbia started in 1890 with the first attempt by the British Columbia government to establish a provincial university, An Act Respecting the University of British Columbia that established the first convocation of the "one university for the whole of British Columbia for the purpose of raising the standard of higher education in the Province, and of enabling all denominations and classes to obtain academical degrees." In the same year, Whetham College opened as a small, independent institute located in downtown Vancouver that was intent of preparing "its students not only for the Army, Navy and Civil Service examinations and for Matriculation Examinations in any university or college, but also for first and second year examinations in Arts leading to the degree of Bachelor of Arts in any university;" unfortunately, it closed only three years due to financial difficulties. A second independent post-secondary institution opened in 1892 known as the Columbian Methodist College. It was opened by the Methodist Church of Canada in New Westminster, and it was affiliated with Victoria College of the University of Toronto and offered courses towards Arts & Theology degrees.

McGill University affiliated with a second British Columbian high school in 1903, Victoria High School which was renamed Victoria College later to become the University of Victoria. In 1904 & 1905 McGill University received permission to improve and expand the university's course offerings in British Columbia. Two acts were passed to enable this; An Act Respecting McGill University, which gave McGill University permission to establish a University College in British Columbia for the higher education of men and women, and An Act to Incorporate the Royal Institution for the Advancement of Learning of British Columbia, which established the Royal Institution for the Advancement of Learning of British Columbia. This institution would undertake the responsibility of establishing a college anywhere in British Columbia. Vancouver College in 1906 was formalized as McGill University College of British Columbia; then it began offering first and second year courses in Arts and Applied Sciences.

Victoria College was brought under the direction of the Royal Institution in 1908, and it offered first and second year Arts courses. In this same year, the provincial government made a second attempt to establish a provincial university. They succeeded with An Act to Establish and Incorporate a University for the Province of British Columbia on March 7, 1908. It would be called the University of British Columbia, and it would be located in the western part of Point Grey. However, plans to start construction on the campus for the new university had to be postponed due to lack of funding. Meanwhile, McGill University agreed to continue providing higher education through Victoria College.

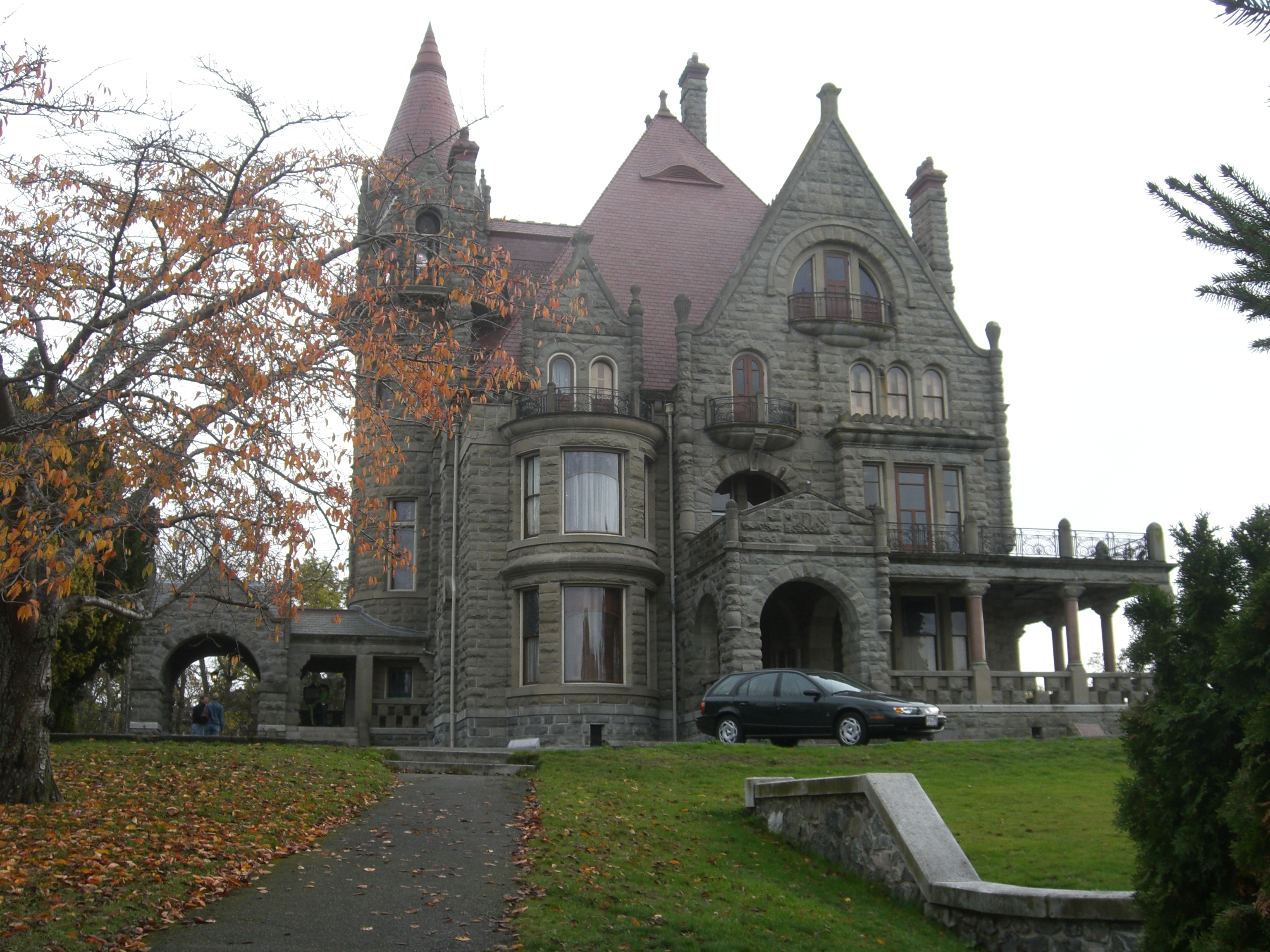
Former home of Victoria College

The provincial government made amendments to the Public School Act in 1894 and 1896 to allow any Canadian university to affiliate with any of the high schools in British Columbia. The high schools could then be incorporated as colleges of these institutions. McGill University was the first to take advantage of this new amendment. By 1898, an affiliation between McGill University and Vancouver High School was established. The high school curriculum was extended to include the first two years of Arts and part of the school become Vancouver College in 1899. McGill University controlled the curriculum, set and marked exams, and approved the hiring of instructors. Students were required to travel to McGill to complete their studies. The provincial government granted a lease for land at Point Grey to the Royal Institution. Construction started in 1911. In 1913, the provincial government appointed Frank Wesbrook as the university's first president, in anticipation of it opening in the near future. However, in 1914, the onset of World War I halted the construction at Point Grey. There would be no more construction for almost a decade.

In 1915, McGill University closed McGill University College. The provincial government changed the provincial university's name to the University of British Columbia and it opened to classes at the Fairview facilities recently vacated by McGill University on September 30, 1915. With the opening of UBC, Victoria College closed. A second Provincial Normal School was also opened in Victoria in 1915. President Wesbrook died in 1918, and Leonard Klinck became UBC's second president. UBC added the Nursing degree program in 1919. This was the first such program in the British Empire. In 1920, the Anglican Theological College opened in downtown Vancouver.

On October 28, 1922, almost 1,200 students with floats, bands and banners marched through downtown Vancouver to the Point Grey campus. This was known as "The Great Trek". The students protested the inferior conditions and overcrowding of buildings at the Fairview campus. It also protested the still uncompleted construction at Point Grey. The student protest and media attention spurred the government to provide funding to finish the construction and move UBC from Fairview to Point Grey. The new Ryerson College took over the theological training curriculum at Columbian College in 1923. Columbian College continued to operate as a residential secondary school and general arts institution. On September 22, 1925 the University of British Columbia opened its first classes at the new Point Grey campus. This same year the Vancouver School of Art opened. In 1927 Ryerson College (Methodists), Westminster Hall (Presbyterians) and the Congregationalists amalgamated to form the United Church seminary, named Union College.

=== Mid 20th century (1930 – 1961) ===
The Great Depression put a halt to any further plans for higher education. UBC came close to being shut down due to government cutbacks, but Professor Henry Angus helped prevent this. In 1936, Columbian College was closed, yet in the same year; the Nanaimo Vocational School opens and starts providing vocational education. The Extension Department (later called Continuing Studies) at UBC is established, enabling UBC to bring higher education to all parts of the province.

With the start of World War II in 1939, UBC's faculty, staff, and students dedicated themselves to the cause. In 1940, the Government of Canada established a military college in Victoria, Royal Roads Military College to train officers for the Canada's armed forces.

After World War II, UBC's President Norman MacKenzie declared any returning veteran was guaranteed a space at UBC. As a result, student numbers tripled to over 9,000 by 1947 and UBC experienced a crunch in classroom space and a lack of faculty to teach the extra classes that were needed. In 1949, the Vancouver Vocational Institute opened. By 1956, a new provincial Teacher Training Program was established at UBC, and the Victoria and Vancouver Normal Schools were closed. In 1960, the British Columbia Vocational School opened under direct management of the provincial government.

=== MacDonald report and expansion of the public post-secondary system (1962 – 1988) ===
In 1962, John B. MacDonald recommended changes in the post-secondary system in British Columbia. A recommendation of the MacDonald report was the establishment of two-year community colleges offering programs in four fields of education: academic (university transfer); career/technical, to train students for specific employment with programs ranging in duration from a few weeks to two or more years; vocational, offering short applied programs of a year or less; and adult basic education to prepare those without high school graduation for other post-secondary programs or for employment. The report marked the development of British Columbia's Post Secondary School System. In the same year, King Edward Continuing Education Centre and the private Christian evangelical college, Trinity Junior College both open their doors.

In 1963, the provincial legislature passed an act to establish Simon Fraser University. The University of Victoria was established in 1963 and moved to the Gordon Head campus. Also, the legislature charted Notre Dame University College of Nelson as a private, Catholic university. The British Columbia Institute of Technology (BCIT) opened in 1964. Simon Fraser University opened in 1965. This same year saw the opening of the first college recommended by the MacDonald report; Vancouver City College. Vancouver City College was the first autonomous community college in BC, formed by amalgamating Vancouver Vocational Institute, Vancouver School of Art, and King Edward Continuing Education Centre.

Community colleges around the province started opening between 1966 and 1975: Selkirk College opened in 1966 followed by Capilano College, College of New Caledonia, Okanagan Regional College, and Malaspina College in 1968. Cariboo College and Douglas College were opened in 1970 followed by Camosun College in 1971, and East Kootenay Community College, North Island College, Northern Lights College, and Coast Mountain College all opened in 1975.

In 1971, Union College and the Anglican Theological College joined to form the Vancouver School of Theology at UBC. Also in 1971, UBC became the first university in Canada to offer a program in Women's Studies for academic credit. Trinity Junior College was renamed Trinity Western College in 1972. The government established the Post-Secondary Articulation Coordinating Committee in 1974 to provide a means of determining whether post-secondary institutions could apply previous credit at another British Columbia institution toward completion of a program. This same year, Simon Fraser University (SFU) became the first university in Canada to have a female president with Pauline Jewett's installment. Then in 1975, the provincial government passed the Royal Roads Military College Degrees Act enabling Royal Roads to grant degrees. In 1977, BCIT opened Sea Island Campus in Richmond.

The year 1978 saw the establishment of the Open Learning Institute, the Pacific Vocational Institute, the Justice Institute, the Pacific Marine Training Institute, and the Emily Carr Institute of Art and Design (ECIAD). In 1981, Kwantlen College formed as a separate institution from Douglas College. Then in 1983, the Nicola Valley Institute of Technology opened to address the low participation and success rates of First Nations students in higher education. 1984 saw the closure of the Notre Dame University of Nelson due to costs per student. In 1985, the Government of British Columbia supported a private member's bill that would change Trinity Western College to Trinity Western University. BCIT merged with the Pacific Vocational Institute in 1986. In 1988, the Open Learning Agency was formed by combining the Open Learning Institute and the Knowledge Network.

=== Focus on transferability and the creation of university colleges (1989–2007) ===
The British Columbia Council on Admissions and Transfer (BCCAT) was created in 1989 to address the concerns about mobility and transferability of program credit throughout British Columbia, especially with regards to university colleges and students wanting to transfer from their local colleges to provincial universities. Between 1989 and 1995, four two-year community colleges became four-year degree-granting university-colleges: University College of the Cariboo, Malaspina University College, University College of the Fraser Valley, and Kwantlen University College. In 1993, Yukon College became a part of the BC credit transfer system. This same year, Aboriginal peoples in British Columbia established Wilp Wilxo'oskwhl Nisga'a, a community driven, student focused aboriginal post-secondary institute. In 1994, Vancouver Community College's Langara campus separated into an independent college, named Langara College. Also in 1994, the University of Northern British Columbia opened, and the Pacific Marine Institute merged with BCIT. Two Aboriginal education institutes — the Nicola Valley Institute of Technology and the Institute of Indigenous Government — were designated as public post-secondary institutions in 1995. That same year, the provincial government passed the College and Institute Act that provided university colleges, colleges, and institutes with authority to grant associate degrees, diplomas, and certificates. Also, 1995 saw the closure of Royal Roads Military College; yet by 1996, Royal Roads University opened on the same campus.

In 1998, the Vancouver Institute for the Americas (VIA) opened independently in downtown Vancouver operating under the umbrella of the UBC Faculty of Education, University of British Columbia, dedicated to the research and projects implementation of education for sustainable development centered in the academic integration of the Americas, then in 2007 stopped operating and its Lectures were absorbed by UBC Vancouver Institute.

In 1999, the Technical University of BC opened only to be shut down in 2002. Simon Fraser University assumed responsibility for the students and facilities of the former Technical University of BC and established its Surrey campus. Also in 2002, the Government of British Columbia passed the Degree Authorization Act that enabled private universities to grant BC degrees. The act also expanded degree-granting capacity for colleges (applied baccalaureates) and university-colleges and institutes (applied masters).

The University College of the Cariboo and the Open Learning Agency amalgamated in 2005 to become Thompson Rivers University. Also in 2005, Okanagan University College is split to become UBC's Okanagan campus and Okanagan College, and the British Columbia government approves new private degree programs at Sprott Shaw College, University Canada West, and Columbia Colleges. In 2006, Canada and British Columbia's first private sector, for-profit, university, University Canada West, opens in Victoria. Former University of Victoria president, David Strong is the first president of UCW. A year later in 2007, Canada and British Columbia's first private, non-profit secular liberal arts and sciences university, Quest University Canada, opens in Squamish. Former UBC president, David Strangway is the first president of QUC.

=== Creation of teaching universities (2008 – present) ===
On April 29, 2008, changes to the University Act established five new teaching universities: University of the Fraser Valley (formerly University College of the Fraser Valley), Kwantlen Polytechnic University (formerly Kwantlen College), Vancouver Island University (formerly Malaspina University College), Capilano University (formerly Capilano College), and Emily Carr University of Art and Design (formerly Emily Carr Institute of Art and Design).

In April 2023, Quest University Canada ceased operation. The campus was purchased by Capilano University to became the new CapU Squamish, and it began offering courses in Fall 2024.

== Structure and Governance ==
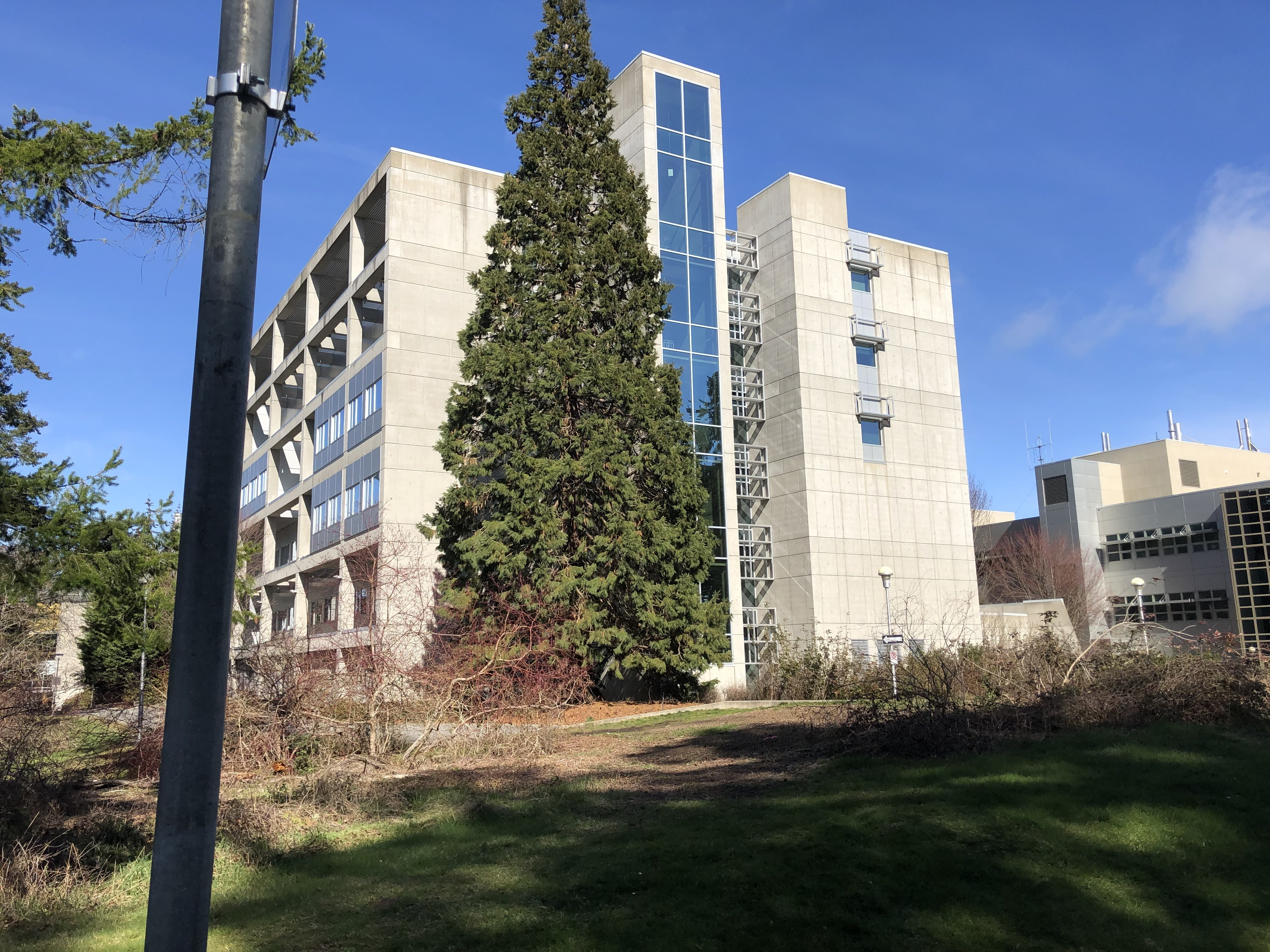
University of Victoria Engineering & Computer Science Building.

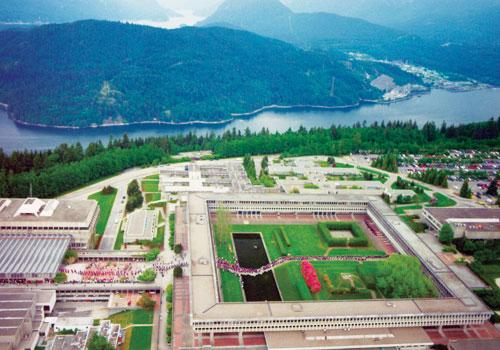
Aerial view of Simon Fraser University at Burnaby, British Columbia.

The provincial government is responsible for higher education in British Columbia. It enacts legislation regarding the establishment, management, and operation of post-secondary institutions. The government also provides leadership and support for post-secondary education. As part of this support, the government manages the overall funding and program co-ordination for the public and private post-secondary education systems, as well as the provincial student financial aid programs for eligible students. In addition, it is responsible for intergovernmental issues, performance accountability, data management and analysis, and policy related to transitions within the post-secondary education system.

To maintain the quality and accreditation of higher education in British Columbia, the government passed legislation titled the Degree Authorization Act that established criteria for when either a private or out-of-province public institution applies for consent to provide degree programs or use the word "university" in British Columbia, or new degree programs are proposed by British Columbia's current public post-secondary institutions. A Degree Quality Assessment Board established in 2002 works with the government on reviews and makes recommendations to the Minister on institution applications.

Higher education institutions in British Columbia have particular mandates and serve specific community needs. They are able to decide how to achieve their mandate and deal with the various levels of administrative details with regard to operations, faculty, staff, and students.

Research universities such as the University of British Columbia (Vancouver and Okanagan), University of Victoria, Simon Fraser University, and the University of Northern British Columbia operate under a bicameral structure composed of a Board of Governors and a Senate. Thompson Rivers University uses a tri-cameral system, which includes a Planning Council for Open Learning. Teaching intensive universities, such as Royal Roads University, colleges and institutes each have a Board of Governors, but instead of a Senate they have a council (e.g. Academic Council). In addition to those bodies, Royal Roads University has a Program and Research Council. Before the legislation of the "College and Institute Act" in 1996, these institutions used to follow a form of governance based on administrative or governing board authority. When the new act came into effect, the bicameral governance permitted faculty to play a role in board governance in a senate-type body where before decisions were made by administrators and board members.

Private career and college institutions fall under the auspice of the Degree Authorization Act, but only if they provide degrees or call themselves "university." Institutions that offer only diploma or certificate programs are legislated by the Private Career Training Institutions Act, and have to register with the Private Career Training Institutions Agency (PCTIA). This self-regulating agency is governed by a board of appointed industry representatives and the board's responsibility is to provide information and consumer protection to the students of registered institutions and to establish standards of quality that must be met by its accredited institutions.

== Funding for public post-secondary institutions ==
"Public post-secondary institutions in British Columbia receive about one-half of their total revenue from the provincial government in the form of grants from AVED. The rest they receive from tuition, ancillary services, federal grants, donations, endowments, investments and research revenue."

Governmental funding for public post-secondary education in British Columbia is done through base funding and strategic funding. Base funding amounts to just under 90% of total government funding. This funding is allocated based on the number of full-time equivalent (FTE) student spaces each institution is allocated. Institutions receive on average $7,200 per FTE for the majority of their programs. Institutions are able to choose which programs they offer and which they will fund. The second part of higher education funding is strategic funding, designed to create spaces for high priority areas with significant labour market demand, such as health and nursing. This type of funding is associated with increasing the number of graduates from high priority programs, expanding online access, and establishes permanent British Columbia Leadership Chairs and British Columbia Regional Innovation Chairs via the Leading Edge Endowment Fund. In most cases, only a small percentage of operating grants (between two and seven percent) is disbursed through strategic mechanisms.

In the report, Campus 2020: Thinking Ahead, the creation of a Higher Education Price Index is recommended to reflect education costs so that each institution can set its own tuition levels independently, but subject to the limits imposed by the provincial government. Regarding the issue of funding higher education in British Columbia, "research-based allocation" of resources will increase the efficiency of these funds. In relation to the system, more funding is necessary to focus on the specific targets of post-secondary achievement by progressively introducing outcome and performance measurements and accountability into the budgeting process.

Tuition fees vary across specific program areas, and detailed information on tuition rates is available from each institution directly. The average tuition for domestic students paid by undergraduate students in 2006-07 was $4,636, which was claimed to be the fourth-lowest in Canada. Domestic students are defined as both Canadian citizens and Permanent Residents. Foreign and International students were required the unsubsidized cost of training, which could total as much as three to five times the tuition fees paid by domestic students.

In 2002, the provincial government de-regulated tuition fees. Higher education institutions, freed from a six-year tuition freeze, and in need of funding to operate their institution, almost immediately raised tuition costs so much that, "de-regulating tuition fees [has] priced post-secondary education out of the reach for thousands of potential students. As those fees continue to rise, students have been forced to drop out all together, drop back from full-time to part-time or take on large levels of debt. The average student debt in 2007 was close to $30,000 according to the Canadian Federation of Students."

Since de-regulation tuition fees have increased, doubling on average for undergraduate students and nearly tripling for graduate and international students. In 2005, the provincial government re-regulated tuition fees, capping increases to the rate of inflation. The government also altered its student aid provisions, eliminating student grants while enhancing loan remission. As a result, with funding falling short of institutional needs, operating costs of post-secondary institutions were shifted on to students via tuition increases, through the sale of endowment lands to developers for market housing, or relying more on corporation and private donations to maintain programs and build or restore facilities.

== Student financial assistance ==
Financial assistance for students attending post-secondary institutions in British Columbia can be either from government or private sources. The government administers a variety of student assistance programs for Canadian citizens, protected persons, and permanent residents. Both loans and grants are available for qualified full-time and part-time students. Such loans include Canada Student Loans and British Columbia Student Loans. Students also may be eligible for Canada Student Grants, depending upon their financial need and personal circumstances.

BC Awards Online is a collection of scholarships, bursaries, and awards for British Columbia secondary students planning to attend a post-secondary institution in British Columbia. Other resources include Studentawards.com, a database of scholarships, bursaries, grants and fellowships operated by an online advertising and market research data collection company, ScholarshipsCanada.com (operated by EDge Interactive, a student recruitment company), and while searches can be tailored to focus on British Columbia, both websites require registration and personal information for access to the databases.

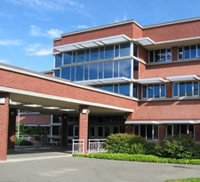
Gustavson School of Business University of Victoria.

For Aboriginal students, resources are available at First Nations Education Steering Committee's Scholarships and Bursaries and the federal government's Aboriginal Bursary System. For students with disabilities, resources are available at National Educational Association of Disabled Students. The federal government also has listings for British Columbia in a section of its web-site dedicated to youth, Scholarships and Bursaries. The Association of Universities and Colleges of Canada (AUCC) manages more than 150 scholarship programs on behalf of the federal government, domestic and foreign agencies, and private sector companies. International students with a permit to study in Canada are usually qualified to apply for entrance or transfer scholarships, and they should contact their intended institution's awards and financial assistance office for further information.

There are also a wide variety of scholarships and bursaries for all types and levels of students, many provided through corporations, private organizations, and individual donors that are associated with a particular institution and information about these financial awards are available from the awards and financial services at each institution.

== Equity, mobility, and access ==
=== Aboriginal students ===
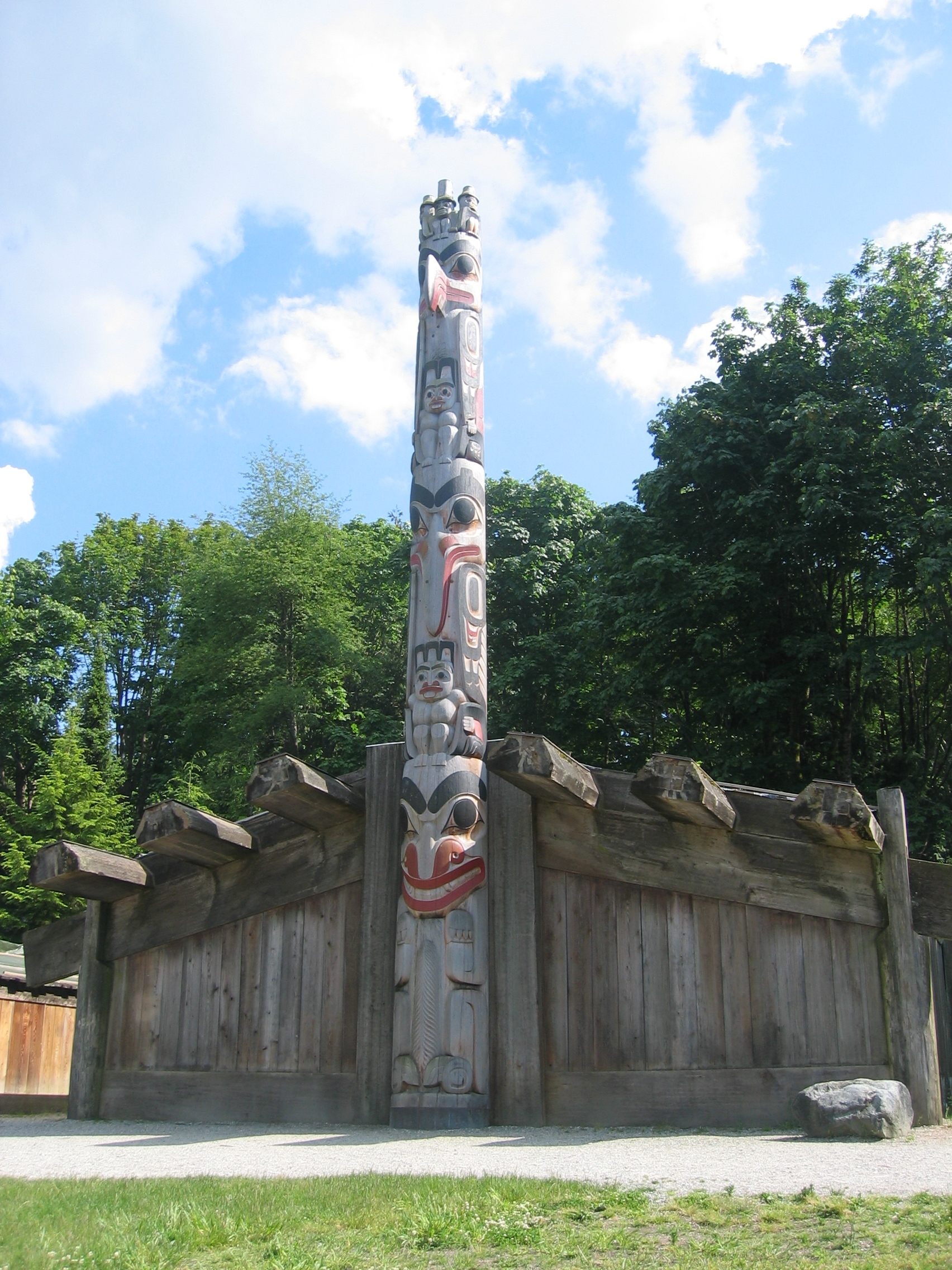
First Nations totem pole and longhouse at the Museum of Anthropology at the University of British Columbia

There is a concentrated effort in British Columbia to increase access to higher education for aboriginal peoples. The Council of Ministers of Education, Canada (CMEC), commissioned a report in 2002 that stated only 38% of Aboriginal students were found to finish high school, compared with 77% of non-Aboriginal students. The legacy of residential schools, of distrust or indifference to the school system, which is seen as antagonistic to their culture, and the lack of reflection of an Aboriginal perspective in the secondary system were all cited as factors in the poor performance and completion of Aboriginals in the secondary system which subsequently affects enrolment of Aboriginal peoples in post-secondary education.

As of 2005, four out of ten Aboriginal people in British Columbia complete post-secondary education compared to six out of ten non-aboriginal students.

Currently in British Columbia there are three Aboriginal institutions, Nicola Valley Institute of Technology, Native Education College (a private Aboriginal College), and Wilp Wilxo'oskwhl Nisga'a. These institutions offer academic, vocational, technical, and continuing education for adults, striving to provide bilingual, bicultural certificate, diploma, and degree programs in areas such as forest rangers/technicians, fishery technicians, biologists, and scientists and training in hospitality and tourism, social services, trades, and financial planning. The following universities offer the largest number of programs designed specifically for Aboriginal students and also have some of the largest enrolments of Aboriginal peoples: Thompson Rivers University, Simon Fraser University, University of Northern British Columbia, University of Victoria, University of British Columbia, and Royal Roads University.

On April 24, 2007, the provincial government announced a $65-million "Aboriginal Post-Secondary Education Strategy" to close the education gap between Aboriginal and non-Aboriginal people. This strategy aimed to accomplish this goal by:

1. Increasing the opportunity for Aboriginal students and those who want to be by providing funding to the Aboriginal Endowment Scholarship, the Chief Joe Mathias B.C. Aboriginal Scholarship, Alberta Centennial Scholarships and loan options through StudentAid BC.
2. Supporting three-year Aboriginal service plans created by communities and institutions to develop partnerships that will encourage people to access post-secondary programs that will lead to jobs in their local areas.
3. Increasing opportunities for institutions and communities to develop Aboriginal-focused programs that recognize cultural and learning needs, like the Aboriginal Special Projects Fund.
4. Building supportive ways to help Aboriginal people enter the education system through adult basic education, upgrading and beyond up to graduate levels to reach their goals.
5. Providing institutions with funding to build culturally welcoming structures and gathering places that will lower isolation and increase retention by reflecting the character, community and traditions of Aboriginal cultures.
6. Encouraging Aboriginal perspectives and decision making by supporting Aboriginal participation on public post-secondary education boards.
7. Continuing to address the education needs of Aboriginal students by working with institutions to create a system-wide standard to track participation and success.

Aboriginal students have personal and academic support like that offered through the First Nations House of Learning at the University of British Columbia, which offers students a "home away from home" and can help to alleviate the feelings of isolation and loneliness that many Aboriginal people feel, especially at large urban universities and colleges. The same principle is available at the University of Victoria at their First Peoples House and Simon Fraser University's First Nations Student Centre.

Every public post-secondary institution in British Columbia provides services or liaisons for Aboriginal students. Thompson Rivers University, for example, provides an Elder-in-Residence in their Aboriginal Cultural Centre. The University of British Columbia provides a wide range of programs and services to Aboriginal students, starting with the First Nations House of Learning, established in 1987, that ensures that students have access to a range of supports. Other programs available at UBC includes the Residency Program, Aboriginal Health and Community Administration Program, CH'NOOK Aboriginal Business Education, First Nations Language Program, Indigenous Studies Program (Okanagan campus), Native Indian Teacher Education Program and Ts"kel Graduate Studies in Education. There is also a specialized campus library at the First Nations House of Learning called Xwi7xwa Library. The University of Victoria also has a wide range of programs and services to Aboriginal students. One key component is the LE,NONET Project, which is composed of a network supporting Aboriginal students at UVic through a Bursary Program, Peer Mentoring, Community Internships, Research Apprenticeships, and Staff and Faculty Aboriginal Cultural Training. In addition, there's also the Aboriginal Language Revitalization Program, an Office of Indigenous Affairs, First Nations Partnership Programs in Early Childhood and Youth Care, Indigenous Governance Program, Indigenous Studies Program, Indigenous Initiatives at the School of Social Work, and the Native Students Union.

There are associations involved with Aboriginal peoples in higher education, such as the Indigenous Aboriginal Higher Learning Association and the First Nations Education Steering Committee (FNESC) Post-Secondary Sub-Committee.

=== Students with disabilities ===
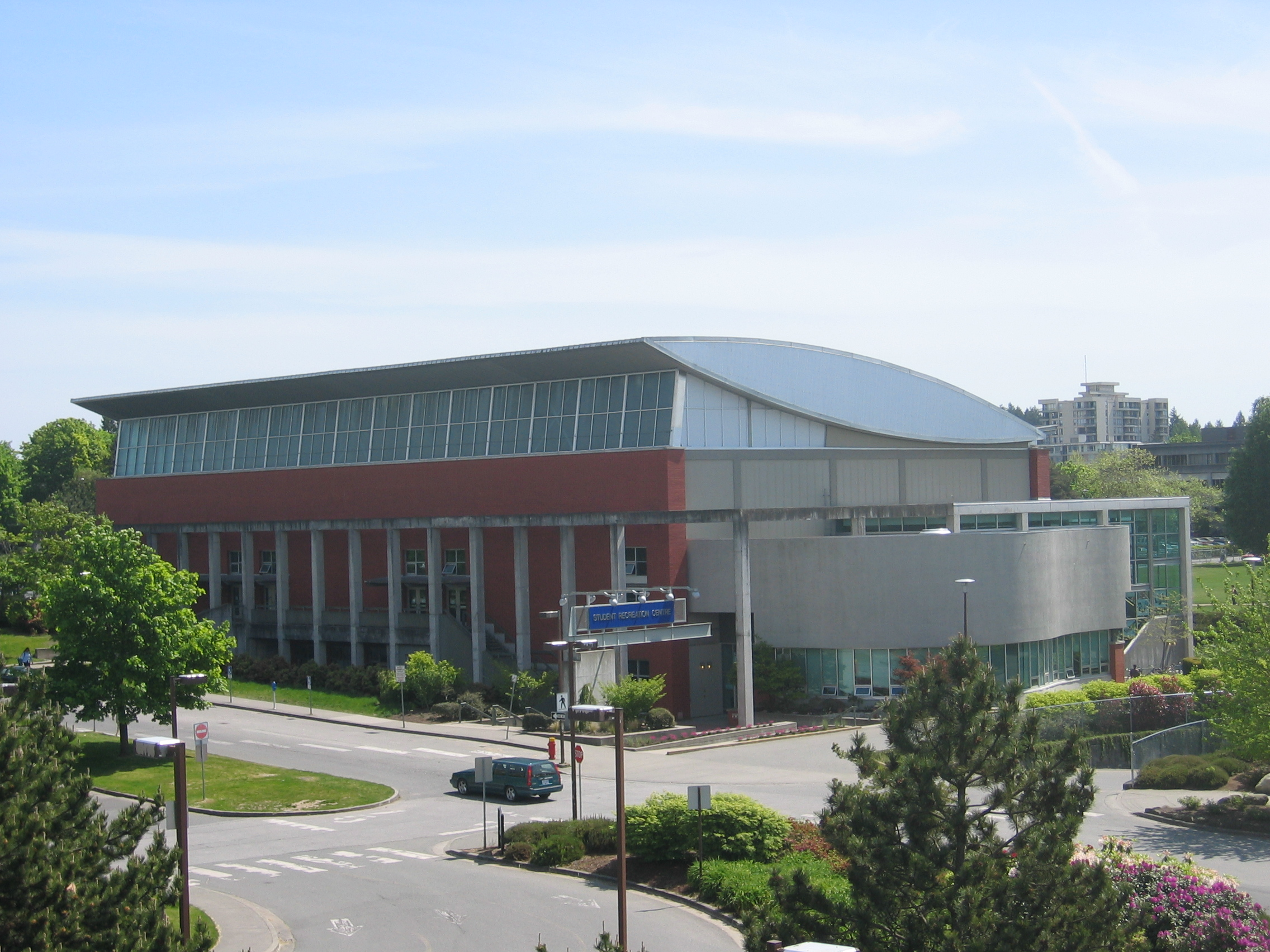
The Student Recreation Centre at the University of British Columbia.

British Columbians with disabilities attending post-secondary institutions have access to some of the most accessible campuses in Canada. Disability services are prevalent at almost all campuses.

Assistive Technology BC works on contract with the provincial government. Its mandate is "to provide technology support services ... to reduce barriers caused by the disability in meeting educational and employment goals. Through this program, adults with disabilities who are post-secondary students and/or clients of EPPD are eligible for special technology support services. These services include assessment, consultation loan of adaptive technology and training on the use of technology, all of which facilitate independence with reading, writing, and communication within learning and work situations."

The University of British Columbia is home to the Crane Resource Centre and Library, which provides resources for students with print disabilities, including a collection of approximately 2000 Braille titles, including dictionaries and foreign language texts; 4500 titles on audiocassette, CD, or e-text; 75 titles in large-print format; and a collection of print books, reports, government publications and journals dealing with blindness and print impairment. Interlibrary loans are available to other post-secondary institutions in British Columbia.

Students in British Columbia that have print disabilities also have access to the College and Institute Library Services (CILS), a centralized service funded by the provincial government and located at Langara College. CILS supports the delivery of accessible resources to BC's students with print disabilities. The service has been growing in the number of customers and diversity of products and services for over twenty years. In 2005, approximately 450 students made use of CILS.

In May 2008, the provincial government announced it would enhance post-secondary education for students with disabilities by providing $12 million over six years. The government indicated that "...the Assistance Program for Students with Permanent Disabilities will be expanded to include students attending private post-secondary institutions within B.C." In addition, a "$6.6 million Supplemental Bursary program for Students with Disabilities also has been created to help with these higher costs. For students with learning disabilities, an assessment is often a necessary prerequisite to receiving the support and services necessary to excel at the post-secondary level. The cost of an assessment can range from $1,200 to $1,800." This is for those students that are unable to pay for an assessment in the first place. Currently students have the opportunity to apply for a "Reimbursement of a Learning Disability Assessment," where if they quality they get a 75% refund of the cost of the assessment.

=== International students ===
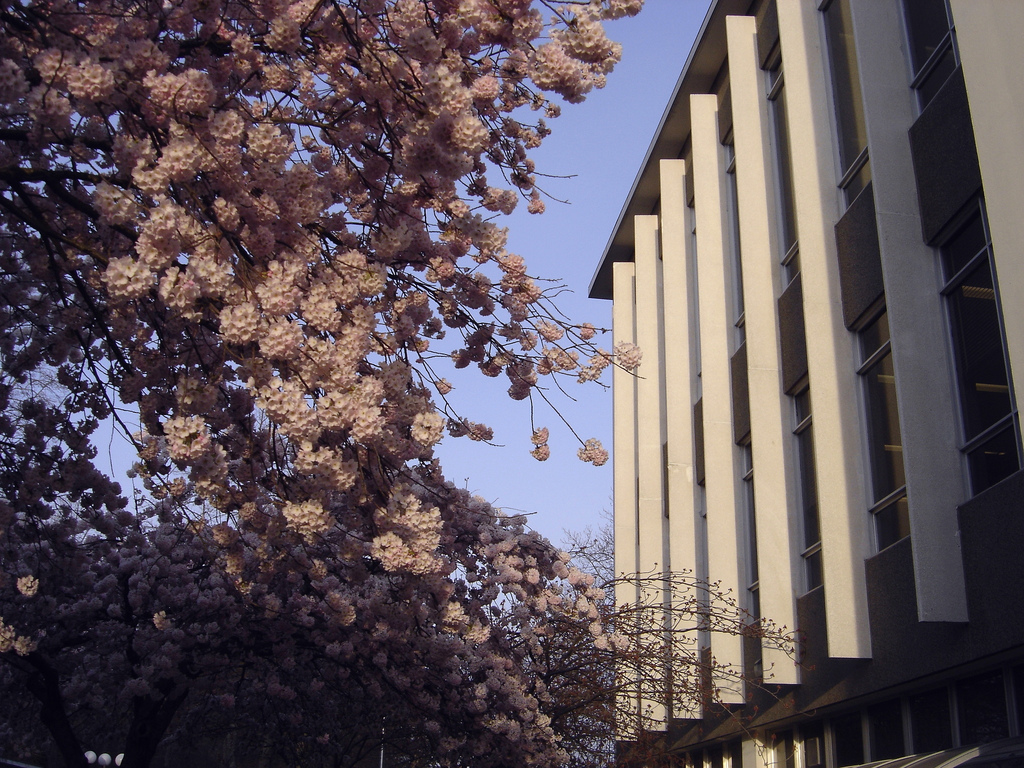
The McPherson Library at the University of Victoria

International students have been coming to British Columbia for post-secondary education for almost as long as the higher education system has been established in the province. Globalization and modern technology has made it easier to obtain education in other countries, and governments are taking note when they consider their post-secondary student populations as a possible source of skilled workers to join the local economy.

In 1983, the BC Ministry of Advanced Education, Training and Technology established the International Education and Training Group (IETG), a forum for discussion between colleges, institutes and universities, and the ministries of Education and Advanced Education. Five years later in 1988, the provincial government commissioned a study on international education issues. The study reported that BC's institutions were uncoordinated in their internationalization efforts, were failing to present a professional image abroad, and that the province was not sufficiently proactive. In 1990, this led to the formation of the British Columbia Centre for International Education (BCCIE)—the first such organization in Canada.

The total number of international students in British Columbia for the year of 2006 was 44,799, up from 23,011 in 1997. This does not include students enrolled in programs of less than six months. This seems contradictory to the statistic of "more than 140,000 international students choosing to study in British Columbia each year", the British Columbia government claims in its Campus 2020: Thinking Ahead report. The top 10 source countries for long-term international students in 2003-2004 were: China, Japan, South Korea, United States, Taiwan, Hong Kong SAR, Indonesia, Mexico, India and the United Kingdom.

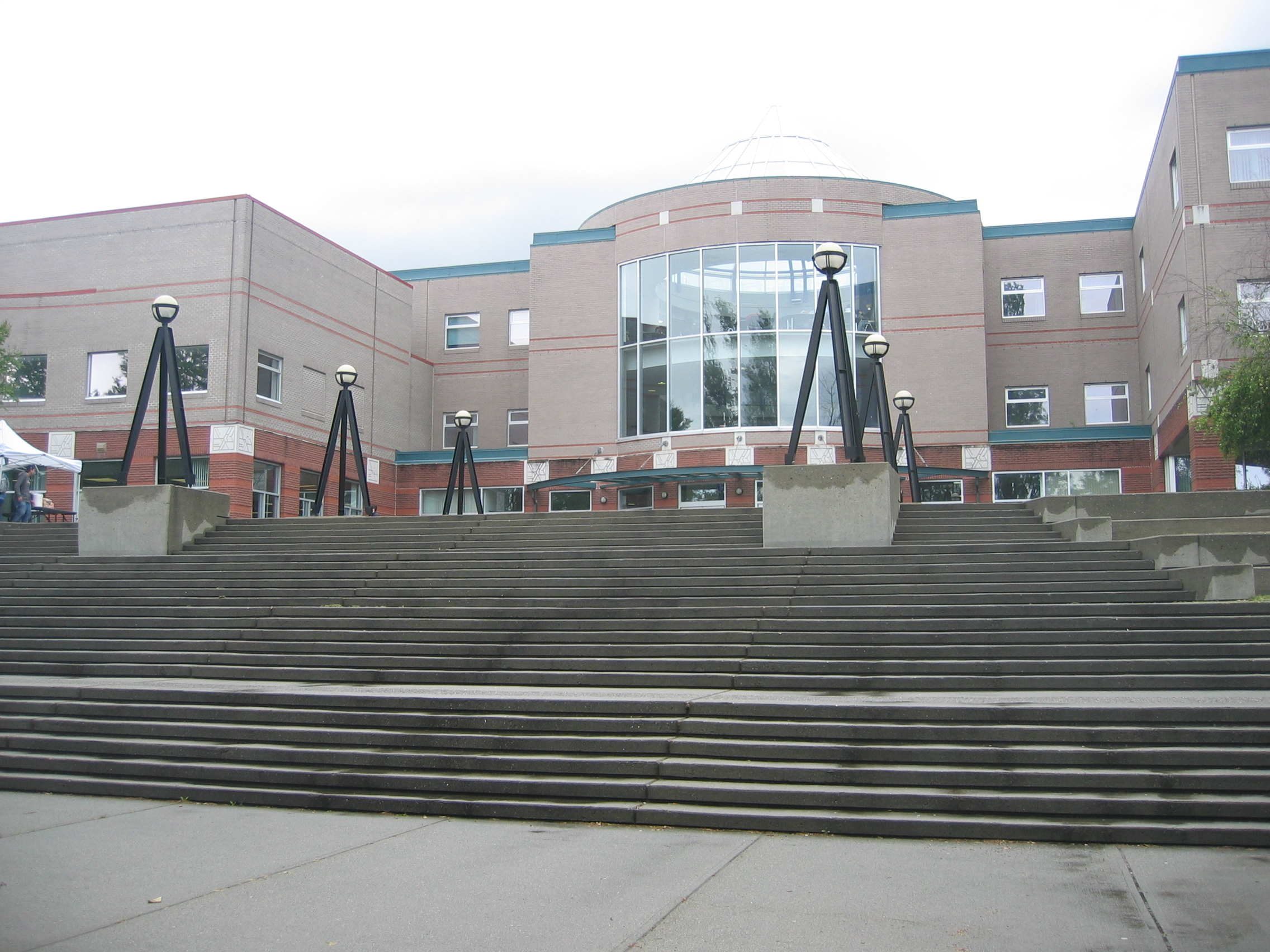
Kwantlen University in Richmond, British Columbia

The federal and provincial government aim to increase the international student population, reasoning that international students enhance the educational experience for all students and that the students’ "cross-cultural skills enhances future business and cultural development" and provides "an economic sector generating significant revenue." The government expects that with international students will also help address labour market needs.

The cost of tuition for international students is greater than tuition for domestic students (i.e. Canadian citizens). There is no public subsidization, and international students pay a mostly full-tuition fee basis. Most international students obtain funding either through personal resources (e.g., family or savings), or obtain funding through the institution, such as entrance awards. There are some government funds, but are usually open to nationals of developing countries only. The Canadian Bureau for International Education lists some of those awards.

The Off-Campus Work Permit Program for international students at public institutions was launched nationally as a formalized program on April 27, 2006. Prior to the introduction of this program, students were only allowed to work on the campus of the educational institution at which they were studying. Students who qualify for the program will be able to work up to 20 hours per week off-campus while classes are in session, full-time during summer and winter breaks, and over their reading weeks.

In April 2008, the Government of Canada's Minister of Citizenship and Immigration announced changes to work permits for international students who graduate from eligible programs at certain Canadian post-secondary institutions, making it easier to attract foreign students to Canada. For the first time, international students would be able to obtain an "open work permit" under the Post-Graduation Work Permit Program, with no restrictions on the type of employment and no requirement for a job offer. In addition, the duration of the work permit has been extended to three years across the country. Previously, the program only allowed international students to work for one or two years, depending on location. A minimum of one year of work experience in managerial, professional or technical positions (i.e., at level 0, A or B under the National Occupational Classification system) will be necessary to apply to stay permanently through the Canadian Experience Class.

Nearly all of the post-secondary institutions in British Columbia have an international students office and student association. International students interested in studying in British Columbia can contact the international office at the institutions they are interested in. In addition, the Government of Canada's Department of Citizenship and Immigration has information for international students about studying in Canada and applying for student visas.

=== Transferability of program credits ===
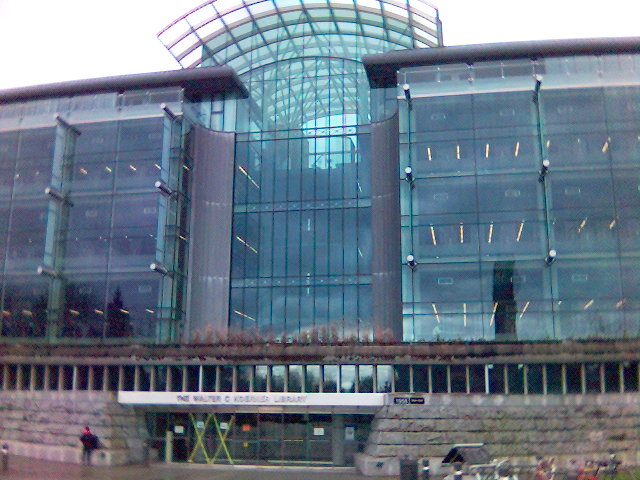
Koerner Library at the University of British Columbia

The ability of students to transfer from one post-secondary institution to another without losing credit for coursework at a previous institution in British Columbia is enabled with the presence of the BC Council on Admissions and Transfer (BCCAT), a provincially funded agency that was created in 1989 to replace the Post-Secondary Articulation Coordinating Committee that had been established in 1974. BCCAT has a mandate to "facilitate admission, articulation, and transfer arrangements among BC post-secondary institutions by encouraging them to develop policies and practices regarding the transferability of post-secondary credit courses so that credit granted at one institution can be applied toward credentials at other institutions."

There are formal agreements between most institutions on mutually acceptable awarding of credits in specific programs. For example, a college may deliver the first two years of an articulated degree program and a university may deliver the final two years and award the degree. Private institutions have to be approved by the Degree Quality Assessment Board and have received the minister's consent to be accepted by BCCAT as a member of the BC Transfer System. The BCCAT has a Private Degree-Granting Institutions Policy that outlines the requirements a private institution must comply with to be considered for membership in the agency.

== Total Enrolment ==
The following table lists the total number of students enrolled in all types of post-secondary institution types in British Columbia by academic year.

Year	Enrolment
1992 / 1993	144,663
1993 / 1994	145,371
1994 / 1995	147,195
1995 / 1996	150,033
1996 / 1997	154,824
1997 / 1998	161,229
1998 / 1999	163,533
1999 / 2000	160,305
2000 / 2001	204,180
2001 / 2002	222,873
2002 / 2003	224,991
2003 / 2004	229,104
2004 / 2005	232,230
2005 / 2006	236,508
2006 / 2007	242,394
2007 / 2008	244,416
2008 / 2009	244,785
2009 / 2010	261,339
2010 / 2011	268,887
2011 / 2012	273,123
2012 / 2013	273,093
2013 / 2014	277,509
2014 / 2015	272,805
2015 / 2016	273,417
2016 / 2017	277,974
2017 / 2018	286,914
2018 / 2019	295,320
2019 / 2020	297,435
2020 / 2021	287,523

== See also ==
- List of universities in Canada
- List of colleges in Canada
- List of business schools in Canada
- List of law schools in Canada
- List of Canadian universities by endowment
- Higher education in Canada
- List of colleges in British Columbia
