= Colleges and Institutes Canada =

Canadian association for higher education

- Collèges et instituts Canada
- Abbreviation: CICan
- Formation: 1972; 54 years ago
- Type: Higher Education Associations in Canada
- Legal status: Non-profit
- Purpose: Advocacy and unification
- Headquarters: Ottawa, Ontario, Canada
- Region served: Canada
- Members: 127 (2025)
- Official language: English, French
- Board Chair: Pierre Zundel
- President & CEO: Pari Johnston
- Main organ: Board of Directors
- Affiliations: World Federation of Colleges and Polytechnics, UNEVOC, EduCanada
- Website: collegesinstitutes.ca
- Formerly called: Association of Canadian Community Colleges (ACCC)

Colleges and Institutes Canada (French: Collèges et instituts Canada), commonly known as CICan, is a national voluntary membership organization representing Canada's public colleges, institutes, polytechnics, CEGEPs, and Indigenous Institutes of Education. Established in 1972, CICan serves as a coordinating and advocacy body for the public college sector, engaging with the federal government, industry partners, and international organizations.

CICan facilitates collaboration among its members, supports leadership development and applied research, and administers domestic and international programs funded primarily by the Government of Canada. Its headquarters are located in Ottawa, Ontario.

== Membership ==
=== Institutional members ===
CICan's membership is composed of publicly funded Canadian post-secondary institutions, including colleges, institutes, CEGEPs, polytechnics, university colleges, and universities with a college mandate. As of 2025, the association represents 127 member institutions across all provinces and territories.

=== Associate members ===
In addition to institutional members, CICan offers associate membership to partner organizations that share aligned mandates, including provincial and territorial associations, non-profit organizations, and education or workforce development consortiums.

== Governance ==
CICan is governed by a Board of Directors composed of regional and at-large representatives. The Board includes six regional directors representing Canada's geographic regions, six at-large directors who are heads of member institutions, and four at-large directors from the public sector. The Board appoints the President and Chief Executive Officer, who oversees the association’s operations and strategic direction.

== History ==
=== Origins and early development (1967–1972) ===
The origins of Colleges and Institutes Canada can be traced to the establishment of the National Commission for the Community College in Canada in 1967. The Commission examined the role of emerging community colleges and recommended the creation of a national organization to represent the sector at the federal level. In response, the Association of Canadian Community Colleges (ACCC) was founded in 1972. Alan Goldenberg was appointed as the organization's first President and Chief Executive Officer.

=== Expansion and international engagement (1970s–1980s) ===
During the 1970s, the ACCC expanded its advocacy activities and established working relationships with several federal departments. By the late 1970s, the association had begun participating in international cooperation and development initiatives, reflecting the growing role of colleges and institutes in skills training and workforce development. Throughout the 1980s, the ACCC increased its involvement in applied research, environmental initiatives, and international education projects, supporting the sector’s expanding mandate beyond traditional teaching functions.

=== Policy influence and federal engagement (1990s) ===
In the 1990s, the ACCC relocated its secretariat from Toronto to Ottawa to strengthen its engagement with the federal government and national stakeholders. During this period, the association advocated for the inclusion of colleges and institutes in federal research funding programs. In 1997, colleges and institutes became eligible recipients of funding from the Canada Foundation for Innovation, marking a significant policy development for the sector.

=== Program development and sector initiatives (2000s) ===
In the early 2000s, the ACCC expanded its activities to include Indigenous education, immigration-related programming, and international development. In 2006, the association convened its first Indigenous Education Symposium. In 2007, it launched the Canadian Immigration Integration Project and advanced the "Education for Employment" framework, initiatives designed to support workforce integration and labour market participation.

During this decade, the association and several member institutions participated in the development of Tra Vinh Community College in Vietnam (later Tra Vinh University) through a project funded by Global Affairs Canada. The initiative supported vocational training and applied education based on the Canadian community college model.

=== Rebranding and reconciliation efforts (2010s) ===
In 2014, the Association of Canadian Community Colleges rebranded as Colleges and Institutes Canada (CICan). That same year, CICan introduced the Indigenous Education Protocol, which outlined principles to guide member institutions in improving outcomes for Indigenous learners and advancing reconciliation.

=== Recent developments (2020s) ===
During the COVID‑19 pandemic, CICan transitioned many of its activities to virtual platforms while continuing to support member institutions. In 2021, CICan collaborated with Saskatchewan Polytechnic to develop the Building Capacity in Long‑Term Care program, responding to workforce shortages in the long‑term care sector.

In 2024, CICan publicly expressed concerns regarding federal reforms to international student permits and the Post‑Graduation Work Permit program. Media coverage and public statements from the association highlighted potential impacts on post‑secondary institutions, regional labour markets, and local communities.

=== Past presidents ===
	Name	Term started	Term ended	Years served	Organization Name
1	Alan Goldenberg	1972	1986	14	The Association of Canadian Community Colleges (ACCC)
2	Tom Norton	1986	1998	12	The Association of Canadian Community Colleges (ACCC)
3	Gerald (Gerry) Brown	1998	2007	9	The Association of Canadian Community Colleges (ACCC)
4	James (Jim) Knight	2007	2013	6	The Association of Canadian Community Colleges (ACCC)
5	Denise Amyot	2013	2023	10	The Association of Canadian Community Colleges (ACCC), changed to Colleges and Institutes Canada (CICan) in 2014
6	Pari Johnston	2023	Present		Colleges and Institutes Canada (CICan)

== See also ==
- Higher education associations and organizations in Canada
