= List of Canadian students' associations =

This is a list of students associations in Canada.

== Alberta ==
Institution	Undergraduate	Graduate
University of Alberta	University of Alberta Students' Union	Grad Students Association
Alberta University of the Arts	AUArts Students' Association	
Athabasca University	Athabasca University Students' Union	Grad Students Association
Bow Valley College	Students' Association of Bow Valley College	
University of Calgary	University of Calgary Students' Union	U Calgary Grad Students Association
Grande Prairie Regional College	Grande Prairie Regional College Students Association	
MacEwan University	Students' Association of MacEwan University	
Keyano College	Keyano College Students' Association	
King's University	The King's University Student Association	
Lakeland College	Lakeland College Student Association	
Lethbridge College	Lethbridge College Students Association	
University of Lethbridge	University of Lethbridge Students' Union	ULeth GSA
Medicine Hat College	MHC Students' Association	
Mount Royal University	Students' Association of Mount Royal University	
NorQuest College	Students' Association of NorQuest College	
Northern Lakes College	Students' Association of Northern Lakes College	
Northern Alberta Institute of Technology	NAIT Students Association	
Olds College	OCSA	
Portage College	Students' Association of Portage College	
Red Deer College	Students Association Red Deer College	
Southern Alberta Institute of Technology	SAITSA	

== British Columbia ==
Institution	Undergraduate	Graduate
British Columbia Institute of Technology	BCIT Student Association	
Camosun College	Camosun College Student Society	
Capilano University	Capilano Students' Union	
Douglas College	Douglas Students' Union	
Emily Carr University of Art and Design	Emily Carr Students Union	
Kwantlen Polytechnic University	Kwantlen Student Association	
Langara College	Langara Students' Union	
College of New Caledonia	College of New Caledonia Students' Union	
North Island College	North Island Students' Union	
Coast Mountain College (formerly Northwest Community College)	Northwest Community College Students' Association	
Okanagan College	Okanagan College Students' Union	
College of the Rockies	College of the Rockies Students' Association	
Royal Roads University	Royal Roads University Student Association	Royal Roads University Student Association
Selkirk College	Selkirk College Students' Association	
Simon Fraser University	Simon Fraser Student Society	Graduate Student Society at Simon Fraser University
Thompson Rivers University	TRU Student Union	
Trinity Western University	Trinity Western University Students Association	
Vancouver Community College	Students' Union of Vancouver Community College	
Vancouver Island University	Vancouver Island University Students' Union	
Vancouver School of Theology	N/A	Vancouver School of Theology Student Association
University of British Columbia	Alma Mater Society of the University of British Columbia - Vancouver University of British Columbia Students' Union - Okanagan	Graduate Student Society of UBC Vancouver
University of the Fraser Valley	UFV Student Union Society	
University of Northern British Columbia	Northern Undergraduate Student Society (NUGSS)	Northern British Columbia Graduate Student Society (NBCGSS)
University of Victoria	University of Victoria Students' Society	UVic Grad Students' Society

== Manitoba ==
Institution	Undergraduate	Graduate
Assiniboine Community College	ACC Students' Association	
Brandon University	Brandon University Students' Union	
Canadian Mennonite University	CMU Students' Council	
Red River College	Students' Association	
Université de Saint-Boniface	Association Étudiante de l'Université de Saint-Boniface	
University College of the North	Student Association Council	
University of Manitoba	University of Manitoba Students' Union	University of Manitoba Graduate Students Association
University of Winnipeg	University of Winnipeg Students Association	

== Newfoundland & Labrador ==
Institution	Undergraduate	Graduate
Memorial University of Newfoundland	Memorial University Students Union	Memorial University Graduate Students' Union
Sir Wilfred Grenfell College	Grenfell College Students Union & GCSU	
Marine Institute of Memorial University of Newfoundland	Marine Institute Students Union	
College of the North Atlantic	College of the North Atlantic Students' Union	

== New Brunswick ==
Institution	Undergraduate	Graduate
Atlantic Baptist University	Atlantic Baptist University Student Association	
Mount Allison University	Mount Allison Students' Union	
New Brunswick Community College	Student Representative Council	
Université de Moncton	La Fédération étudiante du Campus universitaire de Moncton	
University of New Brunswick	Fredericton campus: UNB Student Union; Saint John campus: UNB Students' Representative Council	UNB Graduate Student Association; UGSW
St. Thomas University	STU Students' Union	

=== See also ===
- New Brunswick Student Alliance

== Nova Scotia ==
Institution	Undergraduate	Graduate
Acadia University	Acadia Students' Union	
Atlantic School of Theology		AST Students' Union
Cape Breton University	CBU Students' Union	
Dalhousie University	Dalhousie Student Union	Dalhousie GSA
Mount Saint Vincent University	Mount Saint Vincent University Students' Union	
Nova Scotia Agricultural College	NASC Students Union	
Nova Scotia College of Art and Design University	Students union of NSCAD University	
Nova Scotia Community College	NSCC Student Association	
Saint Francis Xavier University	StFX Students' Union	StFX Students' Union
Saint Mary's University	Saint Mary's University Students' Association	
University of King's College	University of King's College Students' Union	
Université Sainte-Anne	Association générale des étudiants et étudiantes de l'Université Sainte-Anne	

=== See also ===
- Alliance of Nova Scotia Student Associations
- Students Nova Scotia
- Canadian Federation of Students - Nova Scotia

== Prince Edward Island ==
Institution	Undergraduate	Graduate
University of Prince Edward Island	UPEI Student Union	UPEI Graduate Students Association
Holland College	Holland College Student Union	

== Saskatchewan ==
Institution	Undergraduate	Graduate
First Nations University of Canada	First Nations University Students' Association	
University of Regina	U Regina Students Union	URGSA
University of Saskatchewan	UofS Students' Union (USSU)	UofS Graduate Students' Association (GSA-uSask)
Saskatchewan Polytechnic	Saskatchewan Polytechnic Students' Association	

== The Territories ==
Institution	Undergraduate
Aurora College	*Aurora Campus Student Association; *Thebacha Campus Student Association; *Yellowknife Campus Student Association
Nunavut Arctic College	*Arviat Campus Student Council; *Cambridge Bay Campus Student Council; *Kitikmeot Campus Student Council; *Rankin Inlet Campus Student Council
Yukon College	Yukon College Student Union

== National ==
- Black Law Students' Association of Canada
- Canadian Alliance of Student Associations
- Canadian Federation of Students
- Canadian Federation of Engineering Students
- Ukrainian Canadian Students’ Union
- Undergraduates of Canadian Research Intensive Universities
- Canadian Association of Business Students
