= University of Alberta Students' Union =

Student society that represents undergraduate students at the University of Alberta

Coordinates: 53°31′31″N 113°31′37″W

- Motto: To serve, represent, and engage students.
- Institution: University of Alberta
- Location: Edmonton, Alberta
- Established: October, 1908
- President: Pedro Almeida
- Vice presidents: Katie Tamsett (Academic), Abdul Abbasi (External), Nathan Thiessen (Operations & Finance), Logan West (Student Life)
- Members: 37500
- Affiliations: CAUS, CASA
- Website: su.ualberta.ca

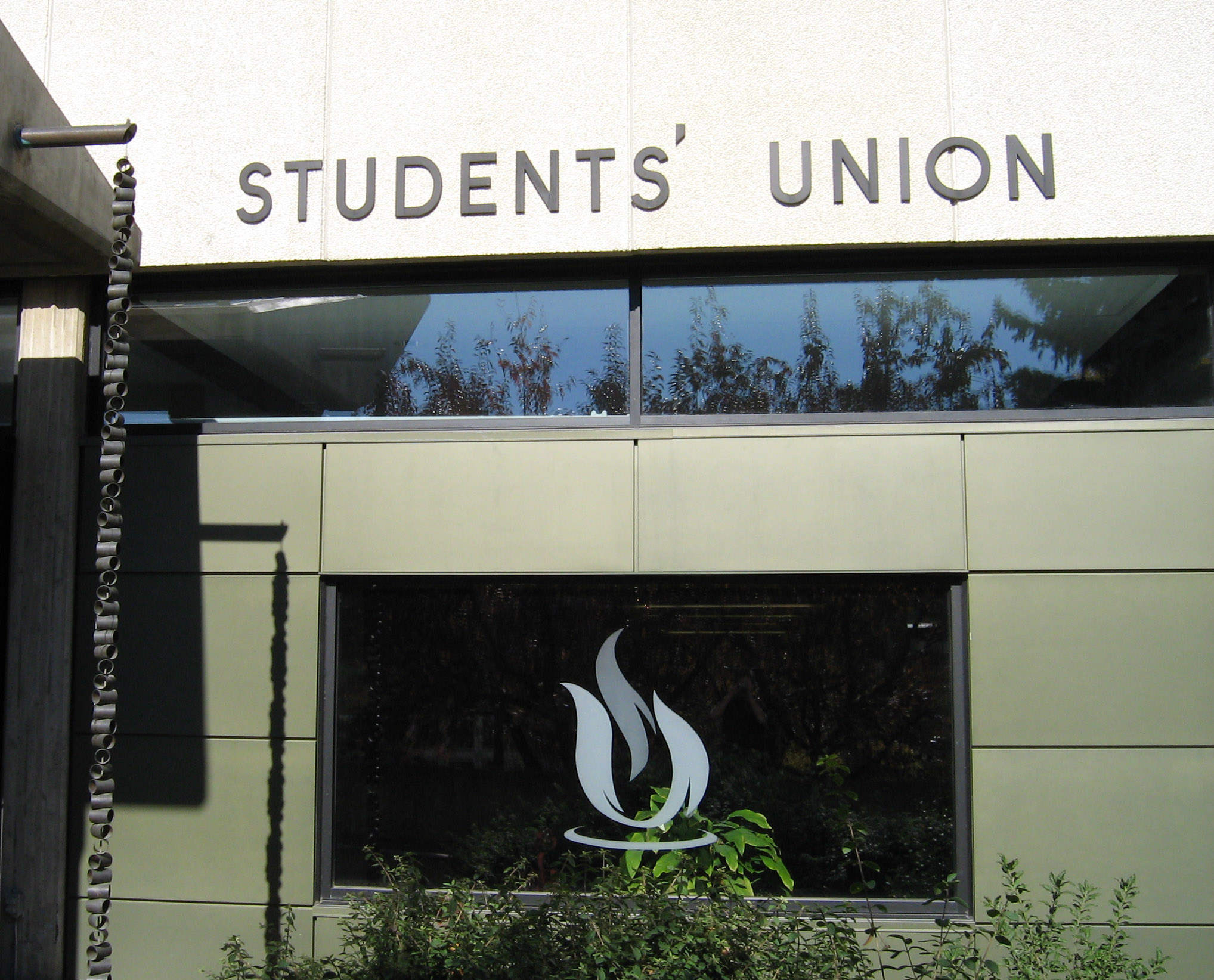
Signage near the south entrance to the Students' Union Building.

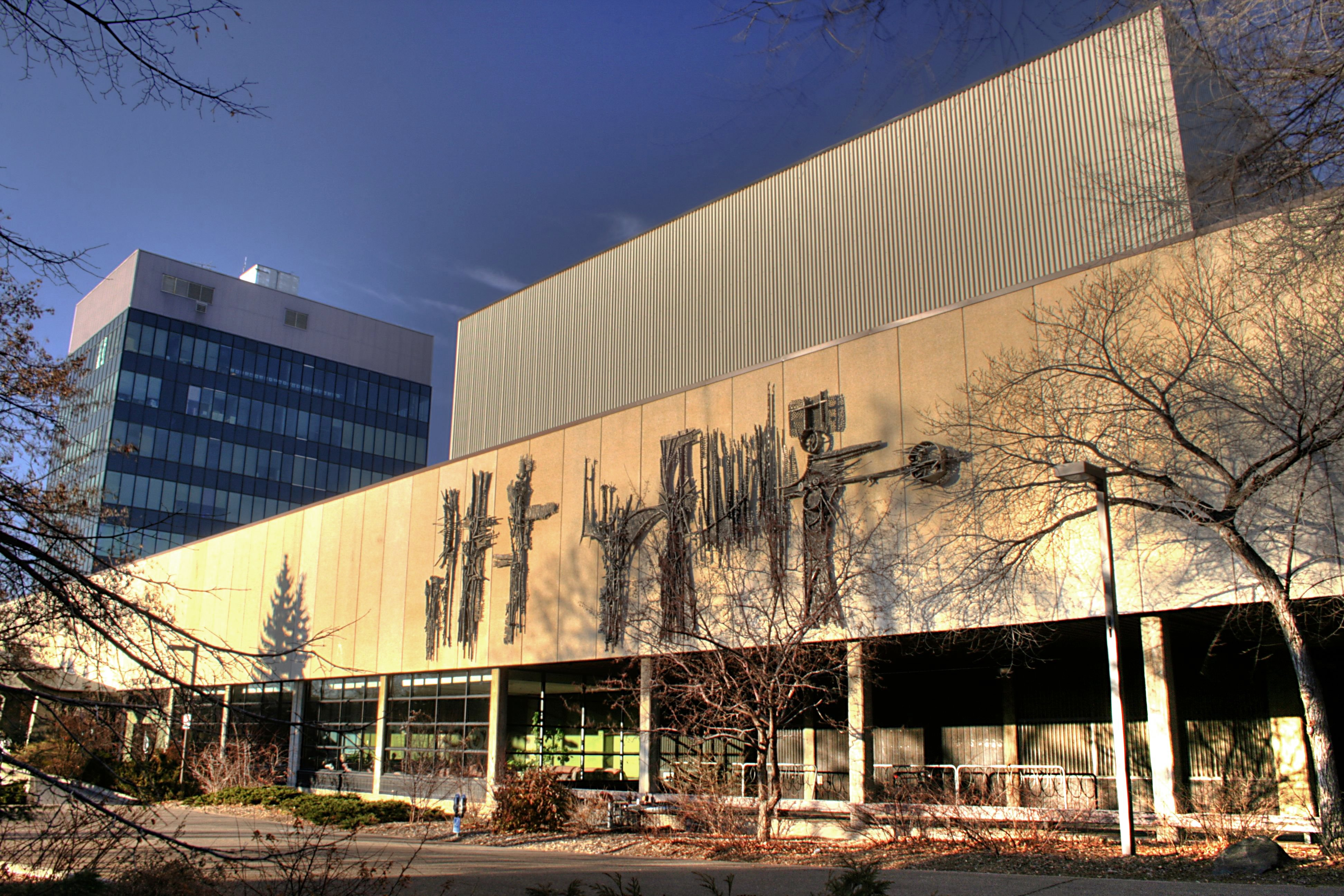
South face of the Students' Union Building.

The University of Alberta Students' Union (UASU) is the student society that represents undergraduate students at the University of Alberta. Originally established in October 1908 as the Students' Council, the UASU is a non-profit corporation that operates under the authority of the Post-Secondary Learning Act (Alberta). Its membership consists of the roughly 37,500 undergraduate students enrolled at the university.

With an annual budget of more than $13,000,000 and hundreds of paid and volunteer staff, the Students' Union serves as an advocate for students and provides a variety of services to its members. The Students' Union also operates a number of businesses, manages various targeted trust funds, hosts a wide variety of entertainment and educational events, and runs the Students' Union Building.

== History ==
The UASU was founded in 1908 following the opening of the University of Alberta. Despite the university having a small student body of only 45 students, the original UASU consisted of eight elected representatives. Among the first body were Stacey McCall, the first UASU president, Cecil Rutherford, son of Alberta Premier and founder of the University of Alberta Alexander Cameron Rutherford, and Kathleen Wilson, the first woman to register at the University of Alberta.

In 1916, Katie McCrimmon was elected as President of the UASU. She became the first woman to become President of a students' union in Canada.

In 1920, the Students' Council was renamed to the University of Alberta Students Union.

In 1927, the UASU undertook its first construction project. Resulting from the lack of sports and recreation facilities, the UASU imposed a $3 annual fee per student, raised $1800 from local businesses, and secured a $20,000 from the Alberta government for the purposes of building a covered skating rink. The rink was completed in December 1927 and remained in use for the next thirty years.

In 1951, the first building constructed by UASU opened. Presently called University Hall, it purpose was to house the UASU, but, was quickly found to be too small. University Hall was given to the University of Alberta's administration following the completion of the Students' Union Building in 1967.

In 1962 referendum, the student body approved an $11/term fee per student for the purposes of building a new student owned facility. In 1965, with funding from the Government of Alberta, construction began. The building, called the Students' Union Building (SUB), opened in 1967 and was the largest building of its kind in Canada upon completion.

In 1971, in response to a lack of affordable student housing, the UASU began construction on the Housing Union Building (HUB). It was completed two years later in 1973 and offered subsidized housing to students. Financial difficulties including a deficit of $1.8 million, forced the UASU to sell HUB to the University of Alberta April 1976 for $1.

In 2018, the UASU celebrated its 100th anniversary.

== Students' Council ==
The Students' Council is the highest decision-making body of the UASU and is composed of a speaker, a general manager (both of whom are non-voting members), councillors elected from each faculty, 5 executive members and an undergraduate student representative to serve on the university's Board of Governors, all of whom are elected in an annual campus-wide general election every March.

The breakdown of faculty councillors is as below:

- 1 from the Faculty of Agricultural, Life and Environmental Sciences
- 2 from the Faculty of Arts
- 1 from the Faculty of Augustana
- 1 from the Faculty of Business
- 1 from the Faculty of Education
- 2 from the Faculty of Engineering
- 1 from Faculte Saint-Jean
- 1 from the Faculty of Kinesiology, Sport & Recreation
- 1 from the Faculty of Law
- 1 from the Faculty of Medicine & Dentistry
- 1 from the Faculty of Native Studies
- 1 from the Faculty of Nursing
- 1 from the Faculty of Open Studies
- 1 from the Faculty of Pharmacy
- 3 from the Faculty of Science

== Representation ==
Provincially, the Students' Union participates in the Council of Alberta University Students. The Students' Union was a founding member of the Canadian Alliance of Students Associations. While it took a brief hiatus on its membership, having pulled out in 2003, the Students' Union moved to rejoin CASA in March 2008.

In the fall of 2016, the Students' Union expanded the U-Pass program to Fort Saskatchewan, Leduc and Spruce Grove.

== Services ==
The Students' Union provides a number of services to assist students in their academic careers. These services include:

- Access Fund
- InfoLink
- Peer Support Centre
- Safewalk
- Bike Library
- Student Job Registry
- Menstrual products
- UASU Perks
- UASU Awards
- Dewey’s Pub and Room At The Top (RATT)

The Students' Union also runs several businesses, which offer discounts to Students' Union staff and volunteers.

== Students' Union Building ==
Built in 1967, the Students' Union Building (SUB) is the headquarters of the Students' Union. It contains the Horowitz Theatre.

=== Horowitz Theatre ===
The Horowitz Theatre is a 683-seat concert hall which hosts a variety of events, including live music, dance and lectures. The theatre has no regular season, and is rented by various student and community groups. They also regularly host shows organized by promoters looking for an intimate mid-sized venue in Edmonton.

Built in 1967 during the building of the Students' Union Building, the theatre was originally called SUB Theatre. The theatre has been through three renovations since opening: a major overall in 1983, a technical update in 1988, and another major renovation which finished in 2024. The theatre was renamed in 1989 to honour the outgoing university president at the time, Dr. Myer Horowitz.

== Notable past presidents ==
Several people who have served as president of the University of Alberta Students' Union have gone on to achieve some level of fame.

- James Harwood Ogilvie, who served as president in 1917–1918, went on to become a long time alderman on Edmonton City Council and an unsuccessful candidate for the Conservative Party in the 1935 and 1940 federal elections in Edmonton West.
- Percy Griffith Davies was president in 1925-1926 and later served as a Conservative Member of Parliament from 1932 until 1935.
- Gerard Amerongen, president in 1943–1944, became a Progressive Conservative member of the Legislative Assembly of Alberta (and later its Speaker), representing Edmonton Meadowlark from 1971 until 1986.
- Peter Lougheed, president in 1951–1952, was Premier of Alberta from 1971 until 1985.
- Lou Hyndman, president in 1958–1959, was a Progressive Conservative member of the Legislative Assembly of Alberta (representing Edmonton West from 1967 until 1971 and Edmonton-Glenora from 1971 until 1986) and provincial treasurer.
- Marilyn Pilkington, president in 1968–1969, was the first female Dean of Osgoode Hall in 1983.
- David Leadbeater, president in 1969–1970, became the youngest alderman in the history of the Edmonton City Council, elected at the age of 27 and serving from 1974 until 1977.
- Robert G. Greenhill, president in 1982-1984, being the youngest ever at 20 years old and elected to this position during a criss that threatened to bankrupt the organization. He then held Executive Roles leading to President, International Group at Bombardier Inc. (1985-2004), was recognised in 1998 as Canada's Top 40 under 40, became president of the Canadian International Development Agency (CIDA) and Deputy Minister for International Cooperation (2005-2008), Managing Director and Chief Business Officer of the World Economic Forum (WEF) (2008-2014).
- Mike Nickel, president in 1985–1986, became an alderman (2004–2007), two-time mayoral candidate, and prominent conservative in Edmonton.
- Mike Hudema, president in 2002–2003, is a prominent activist.

== See also ==
- The Gateway, student paper at the University of Alberta.
