= Robert Greenhill =

Robert Greenhill may refer to:

- Robert Greenhill-Russell (1763–1836), British politician
- Robert F. Greenhill (born 1936), American businessman
- Robert G. Greenhill (born 1962), Canadian businessman, civil servant and expert on international development
