= St. Thomas University Students' Union =

Student union at St. Thomas University, Canada

- Institution: St. Thomas University
- Location: Fredericton, New Brunswick, Canada
- Established: 1934 (incorporated in 1974)
- President: Sarah Kohut
- Vice presidents: Matthew Oram (Administration); Megan Cormier (Education); Kyle McNally (Student Life)
- Members: ~2500 full and part time students in Bachelor of Arts, Bachelor of Applied Arts, Bachelor of Education and Bachelor of Social Work programmes
- Affiliations: NBSA, CASA
- Colours: Green and gold
- Public transit: Universal Bus Pass
- Website: www.stusu.ca

The St. Thomas University Students' Union (STUSU) represents students at St. Thomas University (STU) in Fredericton, New Brunswick, Canada. They provide many services to students at STU, such as the Help Desk, SafeRide, pre-legal advice, emergency bursaries and external lobbying. They also lead negotiations on such initiatives as the Student Health and Dental Plans, and a Universal Bus Pass.

The Students' Union was praised for its decisiveness during a 2008 faculty strike.

== Notable alumni ==
- Kelly Lamrock: former President of the Canadian Federation of Students; founding leader of the Canadian Alliance of Student Association; founding President of the New Brunswick Student Alliance; former President of the UNB Student Union; former Minister of Social Development for the Government of New Brunswick; former President of the STU Students' Union
