= List of British Columbia students' associations =

This is a list of students' associations in British Columbia, Canada.

Institution	Undergraduate	Graduate
Camosun College	Camosun College Student Society	
Capilano University	Capilano Students' Union	
Coast Mountain College (formerly Northwest Community College)	Coast Mountain Students Union	
Douglas College	Douglas Students' Union	
Emily Carr University of Art and Design	Emily Carr Students Union	
Kwantlen Polytechnic University	Kwantlen Student Association	
Langara College	Langara Students' Union	
College of New Caledonia	College of New Caledonia Students' Union	
North Island College	North Island Students' Union	
Okanagan College	Okanagan College Students' Union	
College of the Rockies	College of the Rockies Students' Association	
Regent College	N/A	Regent College Student Association
Royal Roads University	Royal Roads University Student Association	
Selkirk College	Selkirk College Students’ Union	
Simon Fraser University	Simon Fraser Student Society	Graduate Student Society at Simon Fraser University
Thompson Rivers University	TRU Students' Union	
Trinity Western University	Trinity Western University Students Association	
Vancouver Community College	Students' Union of Vancouver Community College	
Vancouver Island University	Vancouver Island University Students' Union	
Vancouver School of Theology	N/A	Vancouver School of Theology Student Association
University of British Columbia	Alma Mater Society of the University of British Columbia - Vancouver Student Union of the University of British Columbia - Okanagan	Graduate Student Society of the University of British Columbia - Vancouver
University of the Fraser Valley	UFV Student Union Society	
University of Northern British Columbia	Northern Undergraduate Student Society (NUGSS)	Northern British Columbia Graduate Student Society (NBCGSS)
University of Victoria	University of Victoria Students' Society	UVic Grad Students' Society

== See also ==
- List of Canadian students' associations
