= Maclean's "Too Asian" controversy =

Controversy by a Canadian magazine

Maclean's "Too Asian" controversy is a controversy around an article published by Maclean's in 2010. Initially titled "Too Asian: Some frosh don't want to study at an Asian university", later re-titled with an added question mark "Too Asian? [...]", and then finally "The enrollment controversy: Worries that efforts in the U.S. to limit enrollment of Asian students in top universities may migrate to Canada," this article was written by Nicholas Kohler and Stephanie Findlay, and published in the 2010 edition of the Maclean's Guide to Canadian Universities. The article was publicly criticized and condemned by various community organizations, universities and levels of government as an example of anti-Asian racism and xenophobia.

== Article's content and criticism ==
The article begins by introducing Alexandra and Rachel, two recently graduated white students from Havergal College, an elite all-girl's private school located in Toronto. Kohler and Findlay explain that these students made a choice that is common among North America's white youth: opting not to attend a university with the reputation of being "too Asian". The term, Kohler and Findlay continue to explain, indicates a university that is intellectually rigorous with an unbalanced campus social climate, brought upon by the presence of academically focused Asian students. The article concludes with a note that Alexandra left Western University, a school considered to be attended by "white students" in the article, for University of Toronto, which is considered to be "too Asian".

Many critics argued that the article's subsequent attempts to provide a debate about the role of race on Canadian university campuses, and the "over-representation" of Asian students on elite university campuses, was highly offensive: it framed "Asian" students as single-minded and socially inept hard-workers, spurred by their tradition and culture, while "white" students are more concerned with the social aspect of universities, such as drinking and partying. Many critiques also took issue with the article's conflation of "Asian" with Chinese, quoting a number of Chinese students in their article, while never addressing how "Asian" itself is a category that subsumes many different ethnic groups. Moreover, no distinction between international students and Canadian-born "Asians" was made (an important distinction that was completely disregarded in the survey). Critics were also shocked by the article's reference to debates in American universities regarding the initiation of race-based quotas to "balance" their campuses because of the over-representation of Asian students.

Response to the article was immediate, widespread and disfavourable. Critics – ranging from journalist bloggers to academics – decried the article for being racist, stereotypical and reductive. The article was criticized for recalling stereotypes of Asians as unbalanced foreigners, with the aim of overthrowing white Canadians from power.

Further criticism followed from the fact that the article depicted Asians as a homogeneous group, without attention to the fact that people from various groups can be classified as "Asian". Another commentator argued that the article inaccurately perpetuated the myth that universities functioned as meritocracies, without taking into account that minorities have to overcome social hurdles, such as racial discrimination and prejudice. It was also argued that the article justified the idea that whites are entitled to attend university, because it never explicitly condemns, and therefore indirectly condones, Alexandra and Rachel's belief that certain universities were "too Asian".

== Protest and government action ==
Coupled with the critiques of the piece was activism and action from grassroots, academic, governmental, university, and youth sectors. The activism protesting the piece manifested in a number of different forms, ranging from humorous (but critical) videos, to community web pages and gatherings. A coalition of over one hundred organizations composed and submitted an open letter calling for an end to anti-Asian racism for those responsible for the piece. Universities across the nation held a series of public educational events, organized by both faculty and students, to debate the article and its implications. The University of Victoria Students' Society went so far as to ban sales of the magazine from their student building.

The cities of Victoria, Vancouver, Toronto, Markham, and Richmond Hill successively passed motions condemning the article and calling for those responsible for the article to issue a public apology. Olivia Chow, a Member of Parliament and member of the New Democratic Party, put forth a motion in the House of Commons of Canada calling for the censure of Maclean's, arguing that the article "is offensive, divisive and suggests that Canadian students of Asian heritage may be limiting opportunities for non-Asian students at certain universities". Senator Vivienne Poy, former Chancellor Emerita of the University of Toronto, argued that the offensive content of the piece makes the magazine unsuitable as a beneficiary of the Canadian government's periodical fund – which identifies it as "material that is denigrating to an identifiable group". The periodical fund annually subsidizes the magazine's publication with $1.8 million of federal funding.

== Maclean's response and aftermath ==
No apology has been offered by either Maclean's or Rogers Communications. Negotiations between Maclean's and Rogers Communications, and the Chinese Canadian National Council and the Chinese Canadian National Council Toronto Chapter were held, but those failed to yield an apology, as the magazine refused to acknowledge that the article was offensive. The magazine instead initially revised the piece's content. It then issued a clarification about the piece's content, changed the article's title twice, and issued an additional statement with the online version of the piece, stating that some of the content could be interpreted as offensive. Maclean's stated that they do not advocate race as a criterion in university admissions, and commended Asians in Canada for succeeding in universities on the basis of merit. Journalists Margaret Wente and Barbara Kay respectively sided with the magazine, stating that it initiated an important conversation that Canadians were afraid to have, and that the magazine, rather than those aggrieved, deserved an apology.

In response, Professor Henry Yu of the University of British Columbia labelled Maclean's actions as a non-apology. John Miller, a former professor of Journalism at Ryerson University, argued that the article was an example of poor journalism and Maclean's reply indicated that "the publication just doesn't seem to get it." Journalist Jeet Heer articulated that, in dealing with the ordeal in the way that they did, both Maclean's and its supporters reflected Canada's inability to constructively talk about the reality of racism. Heer further noted that those who argued in favor of the article evaded acknowledging that it was evocative of racist stereotypes.

Kenneth Whyte, then publisher of Maclean's, has since been promoted as the Head of Rogers' Publications. Nicholas Kohler, one of the authors of the article, is no longer on staff with the magazine. Stephanie Findlay, the second author and then an intern with the publication, moved on to an internship with the Toronto Star. The decision to hire Findlay by the Star was criticized by some, prompting doubt as to whether or not the Star was sincere in issuing an apology for a similar themed and timed article. Findlay is no longer with the Star. Dr. Susan R. Grosbeck, the Principal of Havergal College, publicly stated that Maclean's never confirmed that Alexandra and Rachel actually attended the school. Furthermore, a number of people interviewed by the authors expressed that they had either been misquoted, or that the authors were dishonest in their explanation of their opinions.
