= Canadian Corps (disambiguation) =

The Canadian Corps was a World War I corps formed from the Canadian Expeditionary Force.

Canadian Corps may also refer to the following:

- Canadian Corps (World War II), the unnumbered Canadian Corps formed during World War II
- I Canadian Corps, a Canadian Army corps in World War II that fought in Italy and the Netherlands
- II Canadian Corps, a Canadian Army corps in World War II that fought in France, Belgium, the Netherlands and Germany
- Canada Corps, a volunteer group from Canada
- Canadian Corps of Commissionaires, non-profit security firm
