= Sudhaar =

Sudhaar is working for the improvement of education in several districts of Pakistan. Sudhaar has developed more than 500 Non-Formal Education Centers to provide education to the marginalized working children. Sudhaar has adopted the strategy of mainstreaming to bridge the Non-Formal and Formal Sectors. So far more than 5000 children have been mainstreamed to Government / Private Formal Schools. Sudhaar is also working to improve capacity of Education Departments in various districts as well as. Education Planning at various levels is also one of the speciality of Sudhaar. So far Sudhaar has developed more than 20 District Education Plans, 5000 School Development Plans and 20 Markaz Education Plans, to better functionality and improvement in quality education.

Major partners include:

- ILO
- US Department of Labor
- Save the children
- Canadian International Development Agency
- Punjab Provincial / District Government
- Broad Meadows Middle School

Currently Sudhaars' major project is being funded by the United States Department of Labor through Save the Children UK. The project is focused to Reduce Child Labor in two districts of Punjab Province. More than 15,000 children have been targeted and provided with quality education, in Formal Schools, Non-Formal Education Centers and Literacy / Vocation Centres / Institutes.
