= Acadia Students' Union =

Student body at Acadia University, Nova Scotia, Canada

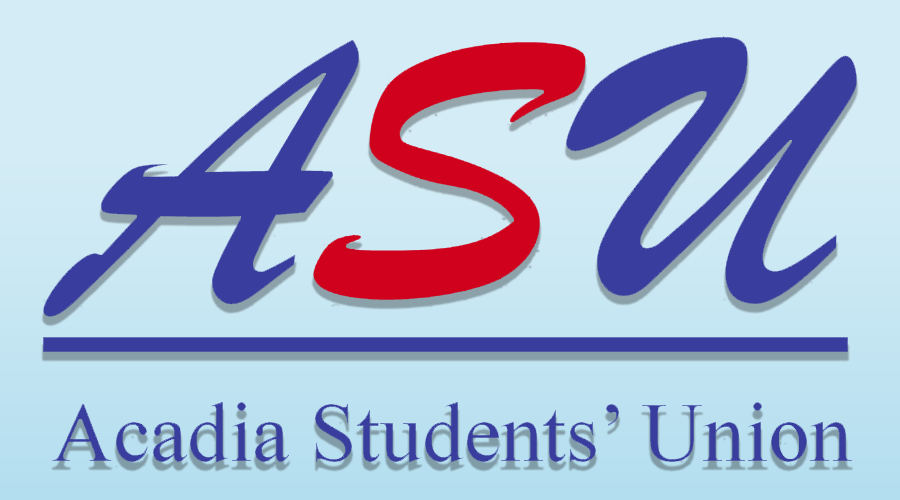
- Institution: Acadia University
- Location: Wolfville, Nova Scotia
- Established: 1967
- President: Emma Boles
- Vice presidents: Treyvon Nicolls, Danika Pitre, Lily Rich, Sam Richard
- Affiliations: CASA, StudentsNS
- Website: www.acadiastudents.ca

The Acadia Students' Union represents the undergraduate students at Acadia University in Wolfville, Nova Scotia, Canada. They are a member of the Canadian Alliance of Students Associations (CASA) and StudentsNS (formerly ANSSA).

== History ==
The Acadia Students' Union is a not-for-profit student organization that provides services, events, societies and advocacy work to the students of Acadia University. Founded in 1967, it is an organization led by students in order to provide services and events to the students at Acadia. It consists of over 80 employees and many more volunteers.

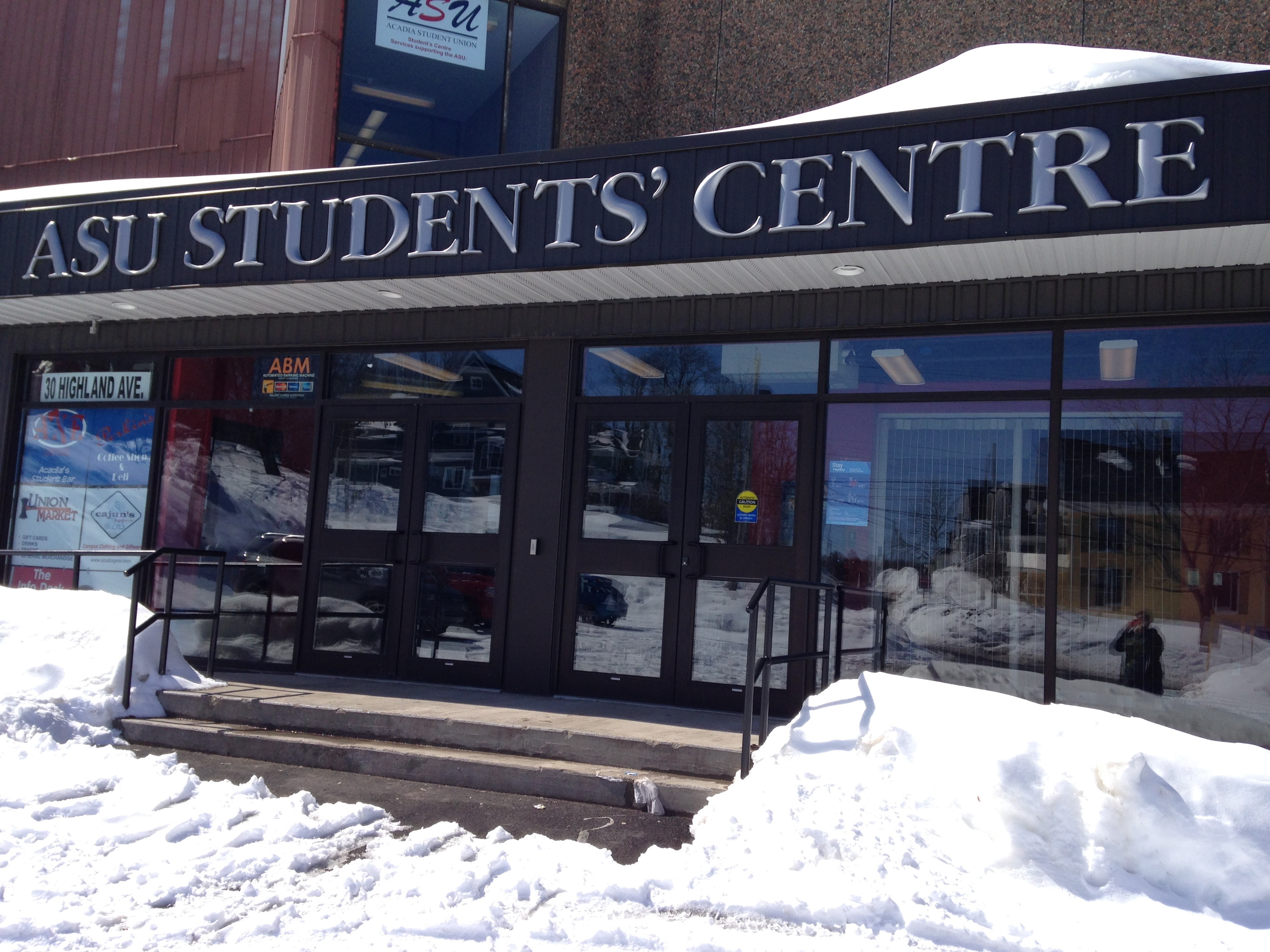
An image of the new rear entrance of the Acadia Students' Union.

The ASU offers many Student Services to help Acadia students have a worthwhile university experience. These services include Off-Campus Housing Assistance, the Safety and Security Shuttle (which helps students get from place to place around campus and off in the evenings) and the Health and Dental Plan. The ASU also hosts the clubs that operate through the ASU, as well as the Internal Organizations like the student-led campus newspaper, The Athenaeum; the campus radio station, Axe Radio; and the Environment and Sustainability Office (AESO). Cajun's, the Union operated clothing store is also owned and operated by the ASU with the proceeds from these sales going directly back to the students.

== Students' Union Building ==
The Acadia Students' Union operates out of the Students' Union Building (SUB) located on Highland Avenue in Wolfville, Nova Scotia. This location, central to the Acadia University campus, is owned and operated by the union.

Inside the building is located several ASU run services as well as offices for the ASU Executive, all of the Internal Organizations, and the university office of Residence Life. The services provided inside the Students' Union Building are the Union Market convenience store, Perkin's Cafe (named after the 12th President of Acadia University), Cajuns Clothing Store, the Axe Lounge, and the Sexual Health Resource Centre. The building also includes an Information Desk which offers postal services, bus tickets, and dry cleaning.

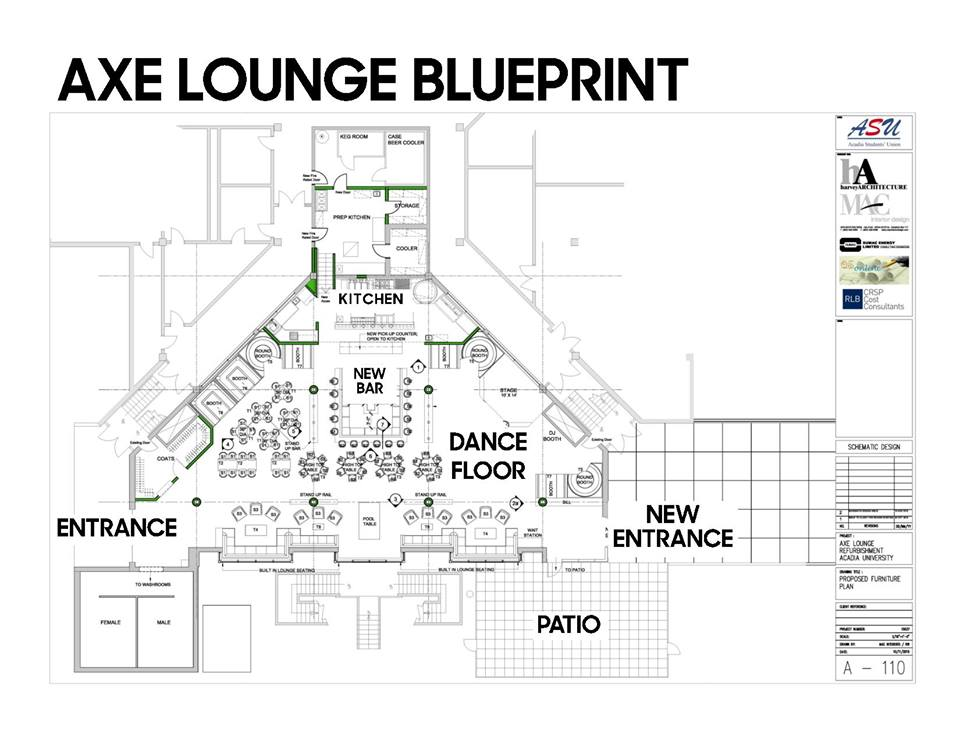
A blueprint of proposed renovations to The Axe Lounge.

== Students' Representative Council ==
The Students' Representative Council (SRC) is the governing body of the Acadia Students' Union. As such, the legislative authority of the organization and its power are governed by the ASU Constitution and By-Laws. The SRC is made up of elected and appointed members from all areas of the Acadia community. These include the Students' Union Executive, the Office of the chairperson, a Diversity & Inclusion Representative, Board of Governors Representative, Faculty Representatives, and Councillors.

The Office of the chairperson is responsible for the effective and efficient execution of all Council and Committee meetings and ensuring that the student body is kept apprised of any important Council decisions and opportunities to get involved. The chairperson for the 2017/2018 academic year is Oliver Jacob.
