= Local Enterprise Investment Centre =

- Founded: 18 September 2005
- Type: A centre funded by Canadian Government through Canadian International Development Agency (CIDA) and managed by IDLC Finance Ltd. (IDLC)
- Purpose: Develop the Small and medium enterprise (SMEs) of Bangladesh
- Location: Dhaka, Bangladesh
- Method: Development through long-term partnership in between Local Small and medium enterprise (SMEs) with foreign company or local big company
- Employees: 9 (Nine)
- Website: http://www.bangladeshinc.com/

Local Enterprise Investment Centre (LEIC) was a centre funded by Canadian Government through Canadian International Development Agency (CIDA) and managed by IDLC Finance Limited (IDLC) to lead investment projects in Bangladesh.

== History ==
The Local Enterprise Investment Centre was launched on 18 September 2005. The first meeting of the LEIC's steering committee took place in May 2006. It was presided by Robert Beadle, chairman of the committee. In June 2007, the LEIC developed a program to boost the activity of Bangladesh SMEs in the software industry.

== Description ==
LEIC was working for the development of the small and medium enterprises (SMEs) in Bangladesh by creating joint ventures or other forms of long-term partnership with foreign or large local companies, which would allow them to have access to capital as well as technology, innovative products and improved process. LEIC provided assistance to the SMEs in two phases: study phase and implementation phase. The assistance which LEIC provided came through sharing of costs.

Services offered by LEIC to the local Enterprises: matchmaking with a partner firm – international or local; conduct feasibility studies for their partnership project; adopt innovative technology, know-how, and best practices for the partnership project; increase the skills-set of their human resources for their partnership project; implement environmental measures and gender equality for their partnership project.
