= Brandon Transit =

Bus service in Brandon, Manitoba, Canada

- Parent: City of Brandon
- Founded: Brandon Municipal Rwy. (1913; 113 years ago); Brandon Transit (1955; 71 years ago)
- Headquarters: 900 Richmond Avenue E.
- Locale: Brandon, MB
- Service area: Urban Area
- Service type: bus service, paratransit
- Routes: 10
- Hubs: 2
- Fleet: 23
- Annual ridership: 1,000,000
- Fuel type: Diesel
- Website: brandontransit.ca

Brandon Transit is the municipally-operated bus service in Brandon, the second largest city in the province of Manitoba, Canada.

Ridership in 2017 was over 1,000,000 passengers or 19,500 per week. Prior to the realignment of routes, the Victoria East and Richmond West had the highest ridership.

== History ==
Public transportation began in the city in 1913 when the Brandon Municipal Railway started their streetcar service, with bus operations being introduced in 1932 after the MacArthur Transportation Company Limited assumed the service. Brandon Transit started up in 1955, initially with a private operator, which the city took over two years later.

== Services ==
Fixed bus routes and Handi-Transit operate seven days a week.

=== Regular Routes ===
On July 31, 2017, Brandon Transit overhauled its existing route system. All former routes, except for Route 4 (Trans Canada), were replaced with more downtown-centric routes, and Route 4 was modified, its main change being that it now returns to the Downtown Terminal via the 1st Street Bridge instead of Braecrest Ave and the 18th Street Bridge.

Route number	Route name	Notes
4	Trans Canada	
5	Assiniboine	
8	Maryland West	
14	Victoria West	
15	East Hospital/ACC	
16	South End Link	
17	South Central	
22	Riverheights West	
23	1st Street South	
(none)	Industrial	Service between various pick-up locations and the Industrial Hub from 5:30 am to 7:00 am, the Industrial Hub and Maple Leaf Foods from 2:00 pm to 4:30 pm every 15 minutes, and no particular destinations (route depends on riders' own destinations) from 11:45 pm to 2:15 am

The former routes, used since 2002, were as follows:

Route number	Route name	Notes
1	Richmond West	
4	Trans Canada	
5	Assiniboine	
6	Victoria East	
9	18th Street South	
10	Central Belt	
11	Industrial	
12	Industrial	
20	City Circular	
21	City Circular	
22	N/E Festival Route	Charter route; run only during the Brandon Winter Festival
23	S Festival Route	Charter route; run only during the Brandon Winter Festival
(none)	ACC North Campus Shuttle	

=== Handi-Transit ===
Handi-Transit Service provides door-to-door transportation for passengers with a disability who are unable to use the regular bus service. Clients must be registered to make use of the service.

=== UPass ===
All members of the Brandon University Students' Union (on the Brandon campus) and Assiniboine Community College Student Association receive an annual Universal Bus Pass (UPass) through their student card.

== Bio-diesel project ==
Originally this was a demonstration project to test one bus using fuel made entirely from waste restaurant fryer oil; the bus was running on 100% bio-diesel with no petro-diesel at all. Now that the feasibility has been proven, the goal was to eventually operate part of the fleet only using city restaurant waste products.

The Bio-Diesel test was discontinued in 2009 when the demonstration unit caught fire. The fire was not related to the Bio-diesel, it was revealed to be an electrical fire. This bus was also the last Orion I in service.

== Facilities ==
=== Transit Operations ===
Address: 900 Richmond Avenue East
Coordinates: 49°49′36″N 99°55′31.5″W
Facilities: Head office and bus maintenance

=== Information Centre ===
Address: 800 Rosser Avenue
Coordinates: 49°50′54″N 99°56′55.6″W
Facilities: Information, maps, tickets, passes, etc.

=== Downtown Bus Mall ===
Address: 8th Street, between Rosser Ave and Pacific Ave.
Coordinates: 49°50′56″N 99°56′54.3″W
Facilities: shelters, benches
Bus bays: 8

=== Richmond Terminal ===
Address: Richmond Avenue, west of 18th Street
Coordinates: 49°49′38.8″N 99°57′48.5″W
Facilities: shelters, benches
Bus bays: 4

== See also ==
- Public transport in Canada
