= Brandon University Students' Union =

Brandon University Students' Union (BUSU)
- Institution: Brandon University
- Location: Brandon, Manitoba
- Established: 1969; 57 years ago
- Members: 3,375 (2020)
- Affiliations: CFS
- Employees: 9
- Website: www.busu.ca

The Brandon University Students' Union (BUSU) represents undergraduate, graduate, and distance students at Brandon University (BU) in Manitoba, Canada. BUSU is a non-partisan and non-denominational not-for-profit organization that represents 3,375 (2020) students. BUSU was incorporated in 1969, and joined the Canadian Federation of Students (CFS) as Local 37 in 1984.

BUSU hosts a variety of events such as speakers, socials, and free food giveaways as well as organizing orientation events at the beginning of each September and January.

BUSU is contracted by the Knowles-Douglas Commission to maintain the day-to-day operations of the Knowles-Douglas Centre, which includes the campus bookstore, Bailey's Café, and The Quill as tenants.

The BUSU office is located on the first floor of the Knowles-Douglas Centre at Brandon University.

== Services ==
The BUSU office functions as the central lost and found for BU. Each year the students' union produces about 3,000 student planners, which are available to students for free. The handbook provides information about the university and the students' union along with a weekly calendar for students to track course assignments and all of their extra curricular activities. BUSU and BU each contribute $15,000 annually to the work study program. The funding is granted to professors and other members of the BU community to hire students to assist in research projects, or in other engagement with the local community.

BUSU and BU each contribute $6,000 annually to the Student Travel & Conference Fund. This service is intended to assist students in covering their travel expenses and conference fees associated with participation in off-campus learning experiences. BUSU works closely with the BU Career Planning office and other employers to provide students with a current website for part-time and summer jobs. In 2015 the Assiniboine Community College Students' Association (ACCSA) and BUSU began a partnership to implement a student discount program with participating businesses throughout Brandon.

Between May 2015 and April 2016 over 300 hampers were distributed helping almost 900 people by the food bank. Every year BUSU hosts the Halloween Food Drive. Student clubs from BU compete to collect the most weight of non-perishable food by trick-or-treating around Brandon. In 2008, Brandon University students voted in favor of creating a Health and Dental Plan for students who do not have alternative coverage. BUSU administers the Health and Dental plan provided by C&C Insurance and Student VIP.

== Collectives ==
BUSU funds, houses, and helps organize five Collectives on the BU campus. The Collectives have guaranteed funding from BUSU each year and deal primarily with topics of gender, expression, diversity, nationality, and inclusion.

- Gender Empowerment Collective
- 2SLGBTQIA+ Collective
- Indigenous Students' Collective
- International Students' Collective
- Racialized Students' Collective

== Fees ==
The following are fees collected by BUSU through the Brandon University.

- Brandon University Students' Union Membership: This fee goes towards the student union's annual operating budget to provide services and governance for students, in addition to organizing events, activities, and campaigns.
- Knowles Douglas Centre (KDC) Student Building Fund: This fee covers the day-to-day operating costs of the Knowles Douglas Centre, also known as the Student Union Building. Costs such as maintenance, repairs, hydro, steam, water, and cleaning. Surplus funds from this fee are allocated towards increasing student space on campus.
- Health and Dental: Only students registered in 12 credit hours or more from September to April or Graduate students are automatically enrolled in the plan. This fee provides students with comprehensive Health & Dental coverage all year.
- U-Pass (Brandon Transit): This fee provides all students on the Brandon campus with access to regular Brandon Transit Bus service all year.
- Canadian Federation of Students Membership: All members of BUSU are also members of the CFS. The CFS provides students with a range of services from the International Student Identity Card (ISIC) to government lobbying on a provincial and national level.
- Quill Levy: This levy allows for BU students to have access to a weekly Student newspaper, both in print and online.
- World University Service of Canada: The World University Service of Canada (WUSC) provides funding for refugee students to attend university in Canada. This fee helps sponsor two refugee students to attend BU.

== Campaigns ==
BUSU runs a number of campaigns in conjunction with the CFS on a number of social, economic, and educational issues. On occasion, BUSU decides that larger actions are necessary to spread awareness and lobby the government about pressing issues.

=== All Out Nov 2 ===
On November 2, 2016, BUSU and the CFS held rallies at Brandon University and the Manitoba Legislature in Support of Bill 15, The Sexual Violence Awareness and Prevention Act, the creation of an Indigenous course requirement, the removal of mandatory attendance requirements, and halting the increase of differential fees for international students. The Manitoba Government passed Bill 15 in April 2017.

=== #Scrap Bill 31 ===
On October 25 and 26, 2017, BUSU and the CFS held rallies at Brandon University and the Manitoba Legislature in Opposition of Bill 31, The Advanced Education Administration Amendment Act, which would allow tuition hikes of up to 5% plus inflation every year and deregulates course-related fees. Over 200 students rallied at Brandon University, and more than 50 people spoke out in opposition at the public hearing on Bill 31. On Nov 10, 2017, the Manitoba government passed Bill 31. On March 17, 2018, BUSU President Nick Brown proposed a motion to the Brandon University Board of Governors to keep tuition increases to a maximum of the rate of inflation, but it was defeated.

== Controversies ==
=== Luanne Warburton Financial Irregularities ===
Luanne Warburton was the BUSU General Manager for 5 years before quitting to become the General Manager of the Assiniboine Community College Students' Association in 2003. After an audit that found financial irregularities in BUSU's financial accounts Luanne was charged with Theft Over $5000 and Fraud with an original court date of February 16th, 2004. By September 2004, Luanne had two additional charges of theft and fraud brought against her by the Brandon Police Force related to theft from the ACC Students' Association between May 2003 and January 2004.

=== Brandon University Students For Life ===
In November 2015, BUSU did not accept the application for Club Status from the Brandon University Students for Life (BUSL). In August 2016, BUSL took legal action against BUSU, suing for reinstatement of Club Status.

At the Fall 2016 Annual General Meeting, the following motion was passed:

"Be it resolved that BUSU club status for the Brandon University Students for Life be immediately revoked, and;
Be it further resolved that BUSU club status never again be given to any reincarnated form of the Brandon University Students for Life."

=== 2020 Election Interference ===
During the 2020 BUSU Election the Elections and Referenda Disciplinary Interpretation and Enforcement Board (ERDIE) received multiple reports regarding "intimidation, threat, or undue influence". The ERDIE Board investigation resulted in the candidates for president and Vice President Internal, Olusola Akintola and Janet Akintola respectively, being disqualified from the election. Olusola and Janet filed a legal application calling for the courts to order BUSU to ratify the results of the election and stated that there is "a conspiracy to prevent some of us from taking office". Janet was reinstated on June 3, and Olusola on July 13 after an independent investigation could not substantiate the evidence of the allegations. A notice of abandonment of the lawsuit was also filed on July 13. On August 10, Olusola resigned stating that, "I needed to move on, actually, I just wanted to fight to get my name back. I didn't like the way I was being treated and I fought to get it back. Once I got it back, I just felt ‘well, let me just leave.’" On October 5, 2020, BUSU put out an ad to fill the vacant position of Vice President Internal, indicating that Janet had also resigned.

There were also allegations stating that a candidate mislead students into believing the polls had closed earlier than expected. The other two candidates in the election were Whitney Hodgins, and Zach Roozendaal, nephew of former BUSU President John Roozendaal.

Hodgins was reached for a comment on the controversy by the Brandon Sun, though Roozendaal states he was never approached for a comment or asked to discuss his feelings by BUSU or any media outlets.

== Elected positions ==
The BUSU Council is elected on an annual basis from May 1 to April 30 every year. The General Election takes place around reading week in late February.

The BUSU Council currently has 18 positions:

Executive

- President
- Vice President Operations
- Vice President Engagement

Directors

- Arts Representative
- Science Representative
- Health Studies Representative
- Music Representative
- Education Representative
- Graduate Studies Representative
- Part-Time/Mature Students Representative
- Women's Representative
- Indigenous Peoples' Representative
- Queer Students' Representative
- International Students' Representative
- Black Students' Representative
- Student Athlete Representative
- Accessibilities Representative
- Racialized Representative

Year	President	Vice President
1967/68	Denny Kells	Harry Van Mulligan

Year	President	Vice President Internal	Vice President External
1968/69	David J. Rinn	Rick Marshall	Warren Brown
1969/70	Clark Fraser	Jim Pringle	Colleen McGuinness

Year	President	Vice President Internal	Vice President External	3rd Vice President
1970/71	Colleen McGuinness	Beverly Bosniak	Wayne Mclennan	Gordon Hornbeck
1971/72	Lyle Dick	Bert Robinson	Vacant	George Ulyatt

Year	President	Vice President Internal	Vice President External
1972/73	Doug Fraser	Morrie Kilberg	Dennis Darling
1973/74	Bob Hunter	Andre Delaurier	Guy Thornton
1974/75	Dave Wellborn	Barb Daniels	Jim McManes

Year	President	Vice President Internal	Vice President External	Vice President Activities
1975/76	Fred Mason	Shannon Bell	Graham Avon	Will Smolkowski
1975/76	Arnie Francis	Shannon Bell	Graham Avon	Will Smolkowski
1976/77	Gordon Morrisseau	Bob Hammond	Gordon Malcolm	Lang Mackie
1976/77	Gordon Morrisseau	Bill McNaughton	Gordon Malcolm	Lang Mackie
1977/78	Bill McNaughton			
1978/79	Joe Zdebiak			Rod Foster
1979/80	Keith Poulson			
1980/81	Craig Dutton	Dave Wilke	Stan Struthers	Bill Garratt
1980/81	Dave Wilkie	Dave Wilke	Stan Struthers	Bill Garratt
1981/82	Drew Caldwell	Bill Garratt	Charmaine Schenstead	Timothy Conlin
1982/83	Charmaine Schenstead	Mark Bonnor	Scott Stewart	Rae Plowman
1983/84	Reg Helwer	Tracy Blanchard	Jillian Hicks	Tim McCartney
1983/84	Reg Helwer	Tracy Blanchard	Ruth Pryzner	Tim McCartney
1984/85	Jes Aagaard	Bruce Hickey	Ruth Pryzner	Wesley Turk
1985/86	Ruth Pryzner	Sean Fedorowich	Clark Marcino	Dawn Aberson
1986/87	Scott Wiley	Dave Sheach	Joe Odartei	Bruce Barber
1987/88	Shelley Ireland	Mark Eichorst	Patrick Braaten	Kent Thorkelsson
1988/89	Shelley Ireland	Elaine McCraken	Al Stitt	Vacant
1989/90	Sean Bowie	Mitch Peacock	Kirk Bruggar	Bob Hume
1990/91	Paul McDonald	David Swayze	Bruce Leflar	Jeff Richert
1991/92	Jeff Richert	James Rogers	Jennifer Howard	Craig Ferris

Year	President	Vice President Internal	Vice President Advocate
1992/93	Jeff Richert	Tracey Walker	Vacant
1993/94	John Roozendaal	Lesley Kretai	Vacant
1994/95	Lesley Kretai	Marlene Powell	Maezie Dadoush
1995/96	Darren Ottaway	Elliott Oleson	Kana Mahadavan
1996/97	Erick Blaikie	Gaylene Gurr	Nolan Erickson
1997/98	Gari-Ellen Donohoe	Travis Chastko	Joe Vercaigne

Year	President	Vice President Finance	Vice President Academic	Vice President Activities
1998/99	Michael Elves	Janine Waines	Jon Friesen	Scott Janes
1999/00	Gregory Kristalovich	Sarah Freund	Laura McDougald	Gerond Davidson
2000/01	Tim McKay		Denise Marsden	Kristina Lonstrup
2001/02	Tim Mckay	Kristina Lonstrup	Blaine Foley	Vacant
2002/03	Carla Harris	Kim Olson	Katie Pollock	Crystal Barber
2003/04	David Cannon	Tom Matthews	Jeff Sykes	Meeghan Gavin
2004/05	Meeghan Gavin	Tom Matthews	Mitch Obach	Vacant
2005/06	Mitch Obach	Courtenay O'Brien-Moran	Nathan Peto	Zoë Gross
2006/07	Stacy Senkbeil	Zoë Gross	Chris Fisher	Vacant
2007/08	Nathan Peto	Stephen Montague	Chris Fisher	Daniel Arellano
2008/09	Stephen Montague	Vacant	Vacant	Vacant
2009/10	Stephen Montague	Grant Bastone	Laura Balanko	Vacant

Year	President	Vice President Internal	Vice President External
2010/11	Jade Visser	Laura Balanko	Shannon Skidmore
2011/12	Deandra Tousignant	Jonathan Keen	Kelsey McDonald
2012/13	Carissa Taylor	Raymond Thomson	Suz Duff
2013/14	Stephanie Bachewich	Matt May	Jenna Clinton (May 2013 – Jan 2014)
2014/15	Joel Springer	Nick Brown (June 2014 – Apr 2015)	Sandra Mutasa (May 2014 – Sept 2014)
2014/15	Joel Springer	Nick Brown (June 2014 – Apr 2015)	Rhoni Mohanraj (Oct 2014 – Apr 2015)
2015/16	Aaron Thompson (May 2015 – Dec 2016)	Nick Brown (May 2014 – 2014 Dec)	Rhoni Mohanraj
2015/16	Nick Brown (Interim) (Dec 2014 – 2015 Feb)	Jill Creasor (Interim) (Dec 2014 – Feb 2015)	Rhoni Mohanraj
2015/16	Aaron Thompson (Feb 2015 – Apr 2015)	Nick Brown (Feb 2015 – Apr 2015)	Rhoni Mohanraj
2016/17	Nick Brown	Jill Creasor	Greg Monias (May 2016 – Feb 2017)
2016/17	Nick Brown	Jill Creasor	Trevor Dean Poole (Feb 2017 – Apr 2017)
2017/18	Nick Brown	Emily Simon	Mohammed Agavi (June 2017 – Apr 2018)
2018/19	Justin Shannon (Aug 2018 – Apr 2019)	Emily Simon	Mohammed Agavi
2019/20	Olusola Akintola	Whitney Hodgins	April Li
2020/21	Olusola Akintola (July 1, 2020 – Resigned August 17, 2020)	Janet Akintola (July 1, 2020 – Resigned September 30, 2020)	Gaynell McCatty (May 1, 2020 – Resigned May 4, 2020)
2020/21	Olufunke Sophia Adeleye (Sept 2020 – Apr 2021)	James Maxon (Nov 2020 – Apr 2021)	Sophia Rivera (Sept 2020 – Apr 2021)
2021/22	Olufunke Sophia Adeleye	Similoluwa Omotoye (July 2021 – April 2022)	Iyiola Sanya Olabowale (May 2021 – January 2022)

Year	President	Vice President Operations	Vice President Engagement
2022/23	Olufunke Sophia Adeleye	Similoluwa Omotoye	Anugo Okudo (July 2022 – April 2023)
2023/24	Anugo Okudo	Chidimna Joy Chikezie	Linden Haubrick
2024/25	Charles Adamu	Chidimna Joy Chikezie	Kesha Haulder
2025/26	Charles Adamu	Michelle Williams-Joel	Michael Uwa-Omoregha
2026/27	Oluwatosin Salau	Samuel Kayode	Michael Uwa-Omoregha

== See also ==
- List of Canadian students' associations
- Canadian Federation of Students
