= University of Toronto Students' Union =

Student union at the University of Toronto

Students' Administrative Council of the University of Toronto, Inc.
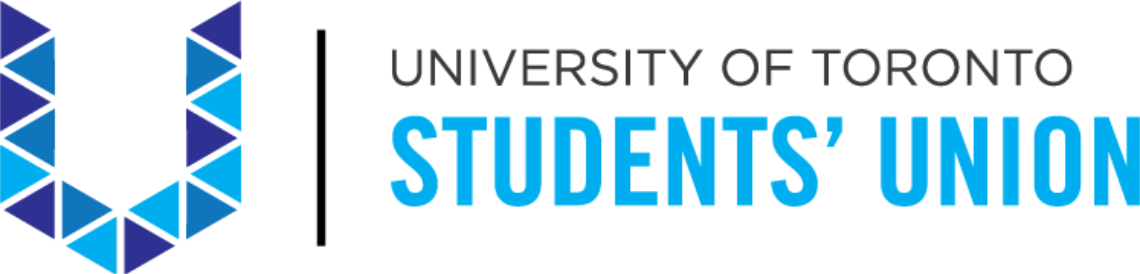
- Institution: University of Toronto St. George
- Location: 230 College Street, Toronto, Ontario, Canada
- Established: 1901; 125 years ago
- President: Marie Kinderman
- Vice presidents: Finance & Operations: Tony Guo; Public & University Affairs: Nadège Jackiw; Equity: Juan Diego Areiza; Student Life: Verona Awino; Professional Faculties: Johnny Dong
- Members: 41,000+
- Affiliations: CFS; UCRU
- Website: www.utsu.ca

Students' Administrative Council of the University of Toronto, Inc., operating as the University of Toronto Students' Union (UTSU, formerly SAC), is the elected representative body for full-time undergraduate students registered at the St. George campus of the University of Toronto.

The UTSU is one of the five primary students' unions at the University of Toronto and maintains a partnership with the other four: the University of Toronto Mississauga Students' Union, Scarborough Campus Students' Union, Association of Part-time Undergraduate Students at the University of Toronto, and University of Toronto Graduate Students' Union. It is also affiliated with the Undergraduates of Canadian Research Intensive Universities (UCRU) and the Canadian Federation of Students (CFS) as local 98.

== History ==
Student government at the University of Toronto has undergone several transformations throughout the university's history. It originated as the University of Toronto Union in 1901 and later became the Parliament of the Undergraduates in 1907. However, low attendance from elected members, particularly from the medical school, led to the executive assuming more responsibilities over time. In 1913, the Parliament was replaced by the Students' Administrative Council, initially composed of male students. In 1916, the Women's Students' Administrative Council was established, and in 1919, the two councils merged to form a Joint Executive. In 1931, the separate councils were abolished, and the Joint Executive became the primary governing body. The name was later simplified to "Students' Administrative Council" in 1935–1936. On November 16, 2006, a general meeting of University of Toronto students resulted in a name change to the University of Toronto Students' Union.

The UTSU's authority and responsibilities were defined by Section 34 of the University of Toronto Act, 1947, until 1971. Initially, the offices of the Students' Administrative Council were located in Hart House. They later moved to the Louis B. Stewart Observatory at the heart of Hart House Circle, adjacent to the Hart House building. Currently, the UTSU's offices are situated in Student Commons, a building located at 230 College Street which opened in 2021.

== Governance ==
The union operates under the governance of a Board of Directors, which consists of elected representatives from the federated and constituent colleges, as well as professional faculties within the university.

The Board of Directors delegated many of its responsibilities to various committees, each focusing on specific areas of concern. These committees include Equity and Accessibility, Campaigns and Outreach, Clubs, Elections and Referenda, Finance, Governance, Services, Student Aid, and the Executive Committee. Composed of board members, these committees address operational, service-related, and campaign-specific matters. The outcomes of committee work are presented to the entire Board of Directors for final approval.

Full-time undergraduate students enrolled at the St. George campus have the opportunity to seek funding from the UTSU for grassroots-oriented advocacy initiatives taking place on campus. This funding is made available through UTSU's Campus Initiatives Policy, allowing students to drive and support initiatives that align with their interests.

=== Federated structure ===
In April 2013, the Engineering Society (EngSoc), a federated body of UTSU, held a student vote to pursue separation from UTSU. This decision followed a period of tension between EngSoc and UTSU. After several years of negotiations, UTSU and EngSoc reached an agreement. As part of the agreement, UTSU recognized EngSoc as the primary student government representing engineering students. Additionally, UTSU ensured that half of all UTSU levies would be allocated to EngSoc, and EngSoc became the primary provider of student services for engineering students. In return, EngSoc agreed not to pursue defederation.

== Elections ==
Historically, voter turnout in UTSU elections has been consistently low for several years. More recently, there was a slight increase in turnout, reaching approximately 15%. However, due to the controversy surrounding the 2010 elections, the turnout dropped back down to 6%. In the 2020 elections, there was a notable increase in voter turnout, with 12.7% of eligible students participating, which marked a significant improvement compared to the 4.2% turnout in the 2019 elections.

== Services ==
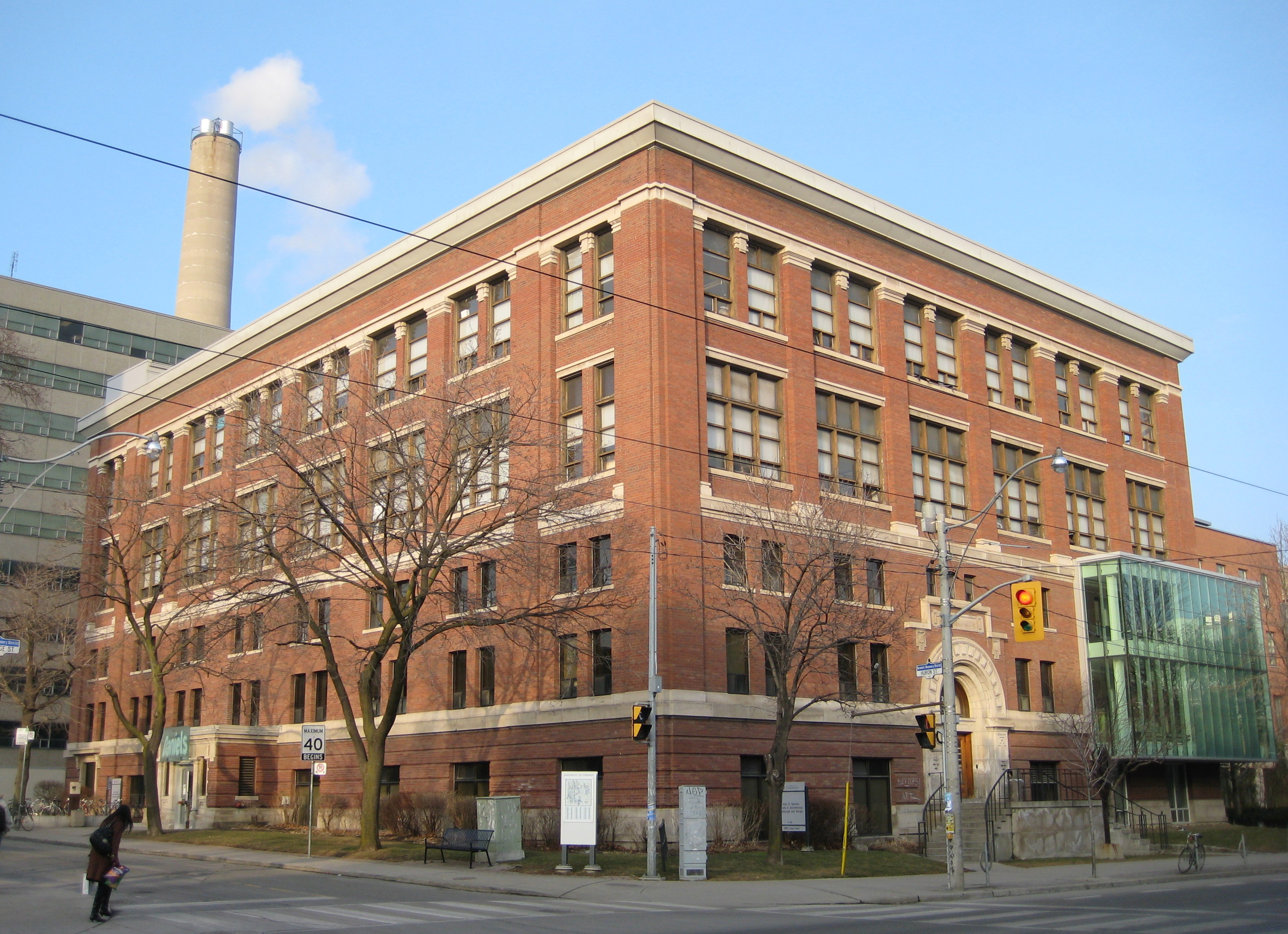
The UTSU is headquartered in the Student Commons building on College Street

The UTSU offers a range of student services aimed at supporting student needs within its jurisdiction on the St. George campus. These services include the UTSU Food Bank, funding and resources for UTSU-recognized clubs, as well as a Student Aid Program that provides bursaries to cover various expenses such as transit, accessibility-related costs, and textbooks. Additionally, UTSU administers a Health and Dental Plan, which provides health and dental insurance to UTSU members.

== Canadian Federation of Students affiliation ==
In November 2002, UTSU members participated in a vote regarding their membership in the Canadian Federation of Students (CFS). The outcome of the vote indicated that 65% of the participating members supported becoming members of the CFS. The UTSU officially became certified with the CFS that same year as Local 98.

In 2016, a movement known as You Decide UofT initiated a petition to hold a referendum on the UTSU's membership in the CFS. A few months later, four out of the seven UTSU executives publicly endorsed the campaign and called for the termination of UTSU's CFS membership. During the 2017 UTSU elections, the Demand Better slate, which advocated for leaving the CFS, achieved victory in most of the executive positions, including the presidency.

The Varsity, the University of Toronto's student newspaper, noted that the process of terminating the partnership is complex, requiring a petition be signed by 15 per cent of constituents and mailed to the UTSU office, among other challenges. Despite the Demand Better campaign goal to sever ties with the CFS, the UTSU remains a member local.

== Stances ==
Flat Fees

In 2009, the University of Toronto made changes to its fee structure for students in the Faculty of Arts and Science. Instead of per-course fees, a flat fee system was implemented, requiring students to pay for five courses regardless of the number of courses taken. This resulted in a 66% increase in tuition fees without corresponding service improvements.

The UTSU has been actively opposing the flat fee structure since its announcement in 2009. Students have faced challenges in balancing part-time employment with their studies due to the inability to reduce their course load under this fee system. The flat fee structure has also added financial burdens for students, exacerbating concerns about mental health. Over the years, the UTSU has launched a robust campaign to address this issue, including petitions, protests, and garnering support from alumni who initiated a letter-writing campaign against flat fees. The UTSU also engaged at the provincial level through the Canadian Federation of Students-Ontario, advocating for changes to the fee-collection model and raising awareness among students across the province.

In 2013, the UTSU intensified its campaign by collecting over 6,000 postcard petitions from students, urging the government to take action on flat fees. These petitions were delivered to the Minister of Training, Colleges, and Universities, Brad Duguid. In December 2013, the provincial government announced new legislation to limit the fees universities can charge. Under the new policy, full tuition fees can only be charged if students are enrolled in an 80% course load or higher. This change will result in reduced tuition fees for some students by over $2300 per year, with the implementation taking place gradually over two years starting in fall 2015.

The UTSU has also been actively involved in other advocacy efforts, including opposing the University's license agreement with Access Copyright, securing rights for unpaid interns, eliminating the need for work permits for international students, promoting open-source software, addressing ancillary fees, establishing multi-faith space, achieving a bottled water-free campus, ensuring student access to athletic space, advocating for a student Metropass, obtaining national grants, establishing childcare facilities at the University of Toronto Mississauga, advocating for a tuition fee freeze, promoting a sweatshop-free campus, divesting from South African apartheid, establishing the Centre for Women & Trans People, and securing undergrad access to Robarts Library.

== Criticisms and controversy ==
Historical criticisms

UTSU and its predecessor body, SAC, have faced criticism throughout their history. One early instance of criticism arose from SAC's policy, established in 1926, of refraining from involvement in political issues to maintain campus unity. This policy extended to The Varsity newspaper, which was under SAC's publication. In 1929 and 1931, SAC dismissed editors who published unpopular opinions. In the mid-1930s, SAC faced criticism for not supporting anti-war and pro-peace advocates on campus, as SAC deemed these groups of limited interest. In 1946, SAC drew campus criticism for not endorsing efforts to prevent the deportation of Japanese Canadians. Anti-racist advocates also expressed disappointment with SAC's lack of support for this cause during the 1940s.

However, in the 1960s, the criticism began to shift as the student council adopted a more activist agenda. A notable example occurred in 1972, when the Medical Society conducted a successful referendum to withdraw from SAC. Administrative delays prevented the withdrawal from taking effect.

Controversial public positions

The UTSU has faced criticism regarding its public positions on equity and racial issues on campus, as well as its involvement in campaigns related to global issues such as the Sri Lankan conflict or the Israeli-Palestinian conflict and federal issues like the Aboriginal movement Idle No More. Some of these criticisms have been raised by members of provincial and federal political parties, including both the Liberals and Conservatives, who have questioned the democratic legitimacy of UTSU.

2007 CFS campaign allegations

The UTSU has faced criticism for its affiliation with the Canadian Federation of Students (CFS), with allegations of interference in student union elections at other schools in the Greater Toronto Area. Former S.A.C. Vice President Sam Rahimi (2004–2005) has stated that he was asked multiple times to participate in election campaigns at Ryerson and York Universities and that he and other student leaders from S.A.C. were brought to these schools during election periods to support C.F.S.-friendly slates. The Canadian Federation of Students has denied these claims.

2008 threats of legal action

The UTSU has been involved in controversies where they have faced accusations of suppressing dissenting voices from students who hold different views than the union. In a recent referendum concerning the construction of a Student Commons Building, which was proposed to be entirely funded and managed by students (rather than relying on private donations and joint administration-student management), The UTSU was accused of targeting students who were perceived to be campaigning against the union. The union's president at that time even threatened legal action against a student who had been putting up posters questioning the UTSU's handling of the student commons issue.

2012 lecture protests

In November 2012, a protest took place against guest lecturer Warren Farrell during an event organized by the Canadian Association for Equality. Approximately fifteen protesters obstructed the entrance to the event, leading to a delay in the lecture. One individual was arrested but later released without charges. The UTSU arranged the protest after their request to cancel the lecture was denied by the university administration. The protest was a response to contentious excerpts from Warren Farrell's publications and comments he made about incest in a 1977 Penthouse interview. During the protest, one feminist protester was documented repeatedly expressing the phrase "You are scum" to a male attendee.

2013 membership defederation

In 2013, Trinity College, Victoria College, and the Engineering Society, which are prominent divisions of the UTSU's membership, conducted referendums to propose defederation from the Union. The referendums sought to redirect fees directly to their respective college- or faculty-based student societies instead of paying them to the union. In all three divisions, the majority of the votes favored fee diversion.

2015 election

In 2015, there was a notable shift in election outcomes when a non-incumbent opposition slate emerged victorious, securing all five executive seats and a significant portion of the board. This marked a departure from the long-standing trend of incumbent victories in previous elections.

Lawsuit against former executives and executive director

On September 24, 2015, it came to light that the UTSU had initiated legal proceedings by filing a statement of claim against the former president, the former vice president of internal and services, and the former executive director in relation to the termination of the former executive director. Subsequently, the lawsuit was resolved through a settlement between the former president and former vice president of internal and services.

== See also ==
- List of Ontario students' associations
