= Dalhousie Student Union =

- Institution: Dalhousie University
- Location: Halifax, Nova Scotia
- Established: 1863
- President: Maren Mealey
- Vice presidents: Eyafee Al Houssain (Internal) Ethan Leckie (Academic and External) William Jones (Finance and Operations)
- Members: 20,000+ (Students of Dalhousie University)
- Website: www.dsu.ca

The Dalhousie Student Union (DSU) is the official representative of students at Dalhousie University in Halifax, Nova Scotia. The DSU is a participatory democracy and student union composed of over 20,000 students studying at Dalhousie University. Through elections, four executive members and 22 faculty and community representatives oversee the day-to-day operations of the Union. The DSU advocates for student rights, builds community on campus through events and supports over 350 societies.

== History ==
On November 10, 1869 students accepted ownership of the Dalhousie Gazette from the founding editors.

A referendum was held February 18–19, 1960, regarding the question of a Student Union Building being built on campus. 90.2% of voters backed the idea. 83.2% of students turned out to vote.

On November 8, 1968, the Student Union Building was opened. The cost of the building eventually was $3,700,000. The construction of the building was made possible in part by the province of Nova Scotia, which granted a loan of $2,766,600 to the Student Union. The SUB loan was retired in 1982.

The CRTC approved student-operated campus radio station CKDU's application for an FM broadcasting license in October 1984. The station's first broadcast was Friday, February 1, 1985, at 3:30 p.m.

The Dalhousie Student Union was a founding member of the Canadian Federation of Students in 1981 but withdrew its membership in 1994. In that same year, it became a founding member of the Canadian Alliance of Student Associations.

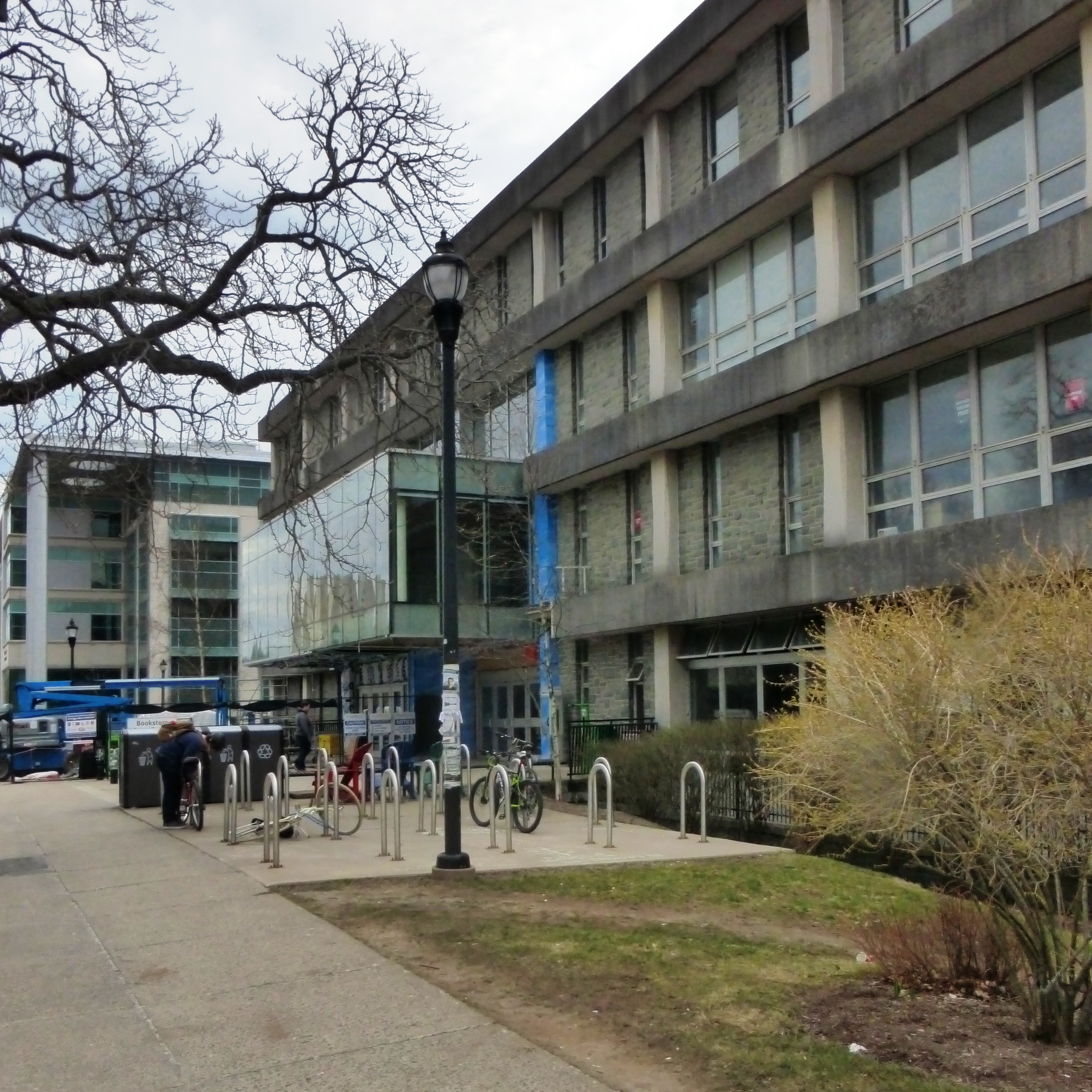
Student Union Building

In 2003, the DSU helped found the Alliance of Nova Scotia Student Associations, later named Students Nova Scotia, Nova Scotia's provincial student advocacy group. On February 27, 2015, the DSU council voted on and subsequently passed a motion to remove its membership from Students Nova Scotia.

== Structure ==
The DSU is run by a Council consisting of members elected by either the student body directly in open elections, or appointed by certain student societies. The Council meets every two weeks during the school year, and monthly during the summer. The Council has the ability to approve budgets and expenditures on behalf of the student body.

Day-to-day operations of the DSU are managed by the Executive, which is led by the DSU President. The Executive has the ability to execute its functions and spend its budget as approved by Council, but any new programs or substantial changes must first be approved by Council.

The DSU also represents students on the Dalhousie Board of Governors and Senate, and to external organizations. The DSU is granted eleven seats on the Senate and three on the Board of Governors. Two of the eleven seats on Senate are occupied ex-officio by the DSU President and DSU VP Academic & External. The remaining seats are filled by appointment by other student societies or the DSU. The DSU President is also a member of the Board of Governors and the remaining student seats are filled by student representatives chosen during an election. Students sitting on the Board of Governors also hold seats on the DSU Council.

The DSU general election is held annually during the Winter term and concludes by the end of March. Any vacancies are subject to a by-election held annually in October. All elections are preceded by a campaigning period as per the DSU bylaws.

The union also employs full-time staff to manage the Student Union Building, the Grawood and T-Room campus bars, research, communications, and reservations for building facilities. All full-time staff are managed by the student union executive.

== Past Presidents ==
Term	Name	Notes
2023-2024	Mariam Knakriah	
2022-2023	Aparna Mohan	
2021-2022	Madeleine Stinson	Two-term president
2020-2021	Madeleine Stinson	
2019-2020	Aisha Abawajy	
2018-2019	Aaron Prosper	First indigenous president
2017-2018	Amina Abawajy	
2016-2017	Kathleen Reid	
2015-2016	Dan Nicholson	
2014-2015	Ramz Aziz	
2013-2014	Sagar Jha	Survived a recall vote triggered in March by the loss of his student status and subsequent ineligibility to remain a DSU executive and resigned weeks before conclusion of term
2012-2013	Jamie Arron	Originally disqualified for too many campaign violations, however, election board overruled enough violations for him to meet the threshold to win.
2011-2012	Chris Saulnier	Two-term president
2010-2011	Chris Saulnier	
2009-2010	Shannon Zimmerman	
2008-2009	Courtney Larkin	
2007-2008	Mike Tipping	First international student president
2006-2007	Ezra Edelstein	Two-term president
2005-2006	Ezra Edelstein	
2004-2005	Curtis McGrath	
2003-2004	Johanne Galarneau	Two-term president
2002-2003	Johanne Galarneau	
2001-2002	Shawn Tracey	
2000-2001	Steven Cote	
1999-2000	Kelly Mackenzie	
1998-1999	Ted Chiasson	
1997-1998	Chris Adams	
1996-1997	Brad Mackay	
1995-1996	David Cox	
1994-1995	Rod Macleod	
1993-1994	Jefferson Rappell	
1992-1993	Lale Kasebi	
1991-1992	Peter Pottier	
1990-1991	Ralph Cochrane	
1989-1990	Dave Shannon	
1988-1989	Juanita Montalvo	
1987-1988	Caroline Zayid	Two-term president; first woman two-term president
1986-1987	Caroline Zayid	
1985-1986	Catherine Blewett	First woman president
1984-1985	Alex Gigeroff	
1983-1984	Jim Hill	
1982-1983	John Logan	Two-term president
1981-1982	John Logan	
1980-1981	Gord Owen	
1979-1980	Dick Matthews	
1978-1979	Mike Power	
1977-1978	Robert Sampson	
1976-1977	Gord Neal	First Black President
1975-1976	Bruce Russell	
1974-1975	Dan O'Connor	
1973-1974	Mike Gardner	
1972-1973	Brian Smith	Two-term president
1971-1972	Brian Smith	
1970-1971	Andy Winstanley	
1969-1970	Bruce Gillis	
1968-1969	Randy Smith	
1967-1968	Dennis Ashworth	
1966-1967	John Young	
1965-1966	Robbie Shaw	
1964-1965	Peter Herndof	
1963-1964	George Cooper	
1962-1963	Alan Robertson	
1961-1962	Dick Thompson	
1960-1961	Douglas Cudmore	
1959-1960	Byron Reid	
1958-1959	Dave Matheson	
1957-1958	Murray Fraser	
1956-1957	Ken Mounce	
1955-1956	Douglas Brown	
1954-1955	Victor F. Burstall	
1953-1954	Gordon McConnell	
1952-1953	George Kerr	
1951-1952	Eric Kinsman	
1950-1951	Sherman Zwicker	
1949-1950	Art Moreira	
1948-1949	James Russell McKinney	
1947-1948	Ross Hamilton	
1946-1947	Clint Havey	
1945-1946	Alex Hart	
1944-1945	Arthur Titus	
1943-1944	Ken MacKinnon	
1942-1943	Henry Tonning	
1941-1942	Webster Macdonald	
1940-1941	George Corston	
1939-1940	Fred Barton	
1938-1939	Gordon Mackenzie	
1937-1938	Fred Day	
1936-1937	Gordon Lea	
1935-1936	H.E. Taylor	
1934-1935	Fred Henry Wigmore	
1933-1934	W.G. Mackenzie	
1932-1933	William Gerald Stewart	
1931-1932	John Denoon	
1930-1931	Gerald Stewart	
1929-1930	Frederick C. Jennings	
1928-1929	Murray McGregor Rankin	
1927-1928	Joseph Gerald Godsoe	
1926-1927	Fred W. McInnes	
1925-1926	A.B. Morton	
1924-1925	L.W. Fraser	
1923-1924	Leonard Fraser	
1922-1923	N.A. Mackenzie	
1921-1922	N.A. Mackenzie	
1920-1921	W. Marshall Rogers	
1919-1920	Daniel W. Hoare	
1918-1919		
1917-1918	C.M. Bayne	
1916-1917	D.G. MacGregor	
1915-1916	J.S. Fraser	
1914-1915	E.C. Phinney	
1913-1914	J. McG. Stewart	
1912-1913	J.D. Vair	
1911-1912		
1910-1911	C.L. Gass	
1909-1910		
1908-1909		
1907-1908		
1906-1907		
1905-1906	J.H. Charman	
1904-1905		
1903-1904		
1902-1903		
1901-1902	J.R. Miller	
1900-1901	L.J. Miller	
1899-1900	David Jardine	
1898-1899	Chas E. McMillan	
1897-1898	D.A. MacRae	
1896-1897	A.D. Gunn	
1895-1896	H.V. Bigelow	
1894-1895	D.K. Grant	
1893-1894	D.G. MacKay	
1892-1893		
1891-1892		
1890-1891	J.W. Brehant	
