= High-level Panel on United Nations Systemwide Coherence =

On 16 February 2006, the Secretary-General announced the formation of a new, high-level panel to explore how the United Nations system could work more coherently and effectively across the world in the areas of development, humanitarian assistance and the environment.

The work of the Panel is supported by a small Secretariat based in New York.

== See also ==
- United Nations
- Robert G. Greenhill
