= Simon Fraser Student Society =

Canadian students union

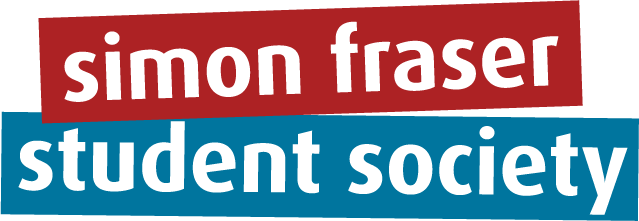
- Institution: Simon Fraser University
- Location: Burnaby, British Columbia, Canada
- Established: 1967
- President: Rishu Bagga
- Vice presidents: Pranay Ratan (Internal & Organizational Development), Mohamed Ahmed Mamdouh Wagdy (Finance & Services), Hyago Santana Moreira (University & Academic Affairs), Jessica Lamb (External & Community Affairs), Deion Fairfax (Equity & Sustainability), Mayank Pandit (Events & Student Affairs)
- Website: sfss.ca

The Simon Fraser Student Society (SFSS) is the students' union of Simon Fraser University in Metro Vancouver, Canada. It was founded after the opening of Simon Fraser University in 1967.

The SFSS consists of over 26,000 students with an annual budget of over three million dollars. Membership is mandatory and all SFU undergraduate students members are charged fees collected by the university on behalf of the SFSS. The organization employs both permanent and student staff at their location on the second level of the Maggie Benston Centre on SFU's Burnaby Campus. The student society also has an office and provides services at the satellite campus of SFU Surrey with Efua Bhavnani as the sole staff operating there. The SFSS has completed the construction of the Student Union Building and Stadium project on the Burnaby campus in August 2020. Together, the two structures are called Build SFU.

The SFSS offers services such as a Women's Centre and a LGBTQ+ Centre on the Burnaby campus run by the SFSS constituency groups known as the Women's Center Collective and the Out on Campus collective. Newer equity-serving services are the DNA Resource Center, the SOCA Black Student Support Center and the FNMISA Center which are run by their respective constituency groups and have a seat at Council.

== Structure ==
The Simon Fraser Student Society's Board of Directors produces a website that declares the Board, as Council (formerly "Forum") and a variety of committees as advisory bodies., the Society's sole decision-making body. Historically, Council/Forum has been the Society's decision-making body, then the Board split off from Forum in 2000. The Board then recently became the Council again, as the highest decision making body in between meetings of the membership as voted at the SFSS 2020 AGM.

The current Council is composed of 7 Executives who are elected directly by the students, as well as composed of seats representing Faculty Student Unions, Departmental Student Unions, Constituency groups and Affiliated Student Groups.

Since the creation of the SFSS in 1967, it has represented graduate and undergraduate students with one Society. However, during the Spring 2007 election, Graduate Students voted to form their own society separate from the SFSS. This is the Graduate Students Society (GSS) at Simon Fraser University.

== History ==
Since its founding in 1967, the organization has been highly politicized.

After a long and highly publicized legal battle, the students voted at referendum in 2011 to leave the CFS and re-allocate the mandatory fees back into the SFSS to provide students with more services.

In 2005, members voted in favour of a graduate health and dental plan. The Student Society began providing health and dental plan services to graduate students in September 2005. In 2007, graduate students voted to separate from the SFSS and establish the Graduate Student Society at Simon Fraser University, which now provides these services.

== Recent History and Activism ==
=== Issues Policies Establishment ===
Over the years 2020-2022, there have been a myriad of issues based policies adopted by the SFSS Board of Directors. Some of which are based on issues of equity and justice, Reproductive Rights, Black History Month, Accessibility, Living Wage, Climate Justice, Indigenous Inclusion and Reconciliation, Disability justice, Anti-Racism, Policing and Militiarization and many more.

=== Increased Student Activism ===
SFU has witnessed a wave of student activism over the last couple of years that was inspired in 2018 by an interconnected combination of movements on campus. This includes women’s rights advocacy sparked by the impeachment of the Simon Fraser Student Society (SFSS) president, calls for equity within our student society over the Rotunda Space issue, and the ongoing battle against yearly tuition increases.

SFSS has successfully lobbied for the construction of the Burnaby Mountain Gondola, mobilized students across North America to take action for climate justice and Indigenous rights, and supported the Don’t Forget Students campaign leading to the Canadian Emergency Student Benefit amidst COVID-19.

=== SFSS Members Condemn SFU Tuition Increases at AGM ===
After refusing to join students’ calls to lobby the BC government together for increased educational funding, SFU raised tuition during the COVID-19 pandemic. A motion was proposed and passed at the AGM to condemn SFU tuition increases as a student body. This represents the first vote of members to condemn SFU in recent years.

== Controversies ==
=== Student health plan ===
In 1996, the organization imposed a mandatory health plan to the student population after passing a referendum question during an earlier election. The health plan sparked much controversy on campus. A group of students started a campaign to dissolve the student society, drastically reduce the student society membership fees, withdraw from the Canadian Federation of Students, and eliminate the health plan. A student petition resulted in having three referendum questions decided in the 1997 general election. Of the three referendum questions, only the referendum question on axing the health plan passed.

=== Quorum ===
Until 2007, a quorum of 500 members was required to make any changes to the Student Society's bylaws and constitution at the Society's annual general meeting (AGM). As the university had approximately 28,000 students, this meant that only 2% of student population was needed to make wide-reaching changes with regards to the SFSS. Despite the seemingly low requirement, quorum had been unattainable most years. In 2005, this led the Society to propose a change to the bylaw, lowering quorum from 500 to 100, which ultimately failed.

The issue had gained attention in the fall 2003 semester, after the Society spent $15,000 hosting a free dinner for students to encourage turnout at the annual general meeting to achieve quorum. Although the quorum of 500 was met, students left part-way through the meeting, causing the meeting to lose quorum. As a result, no voting was done, and an outcry ensued from students for allegedly wasting student fees. The 2006 special general meeting (see #Impeachment) marked the first time quorum had been effectively reached in 10 years.

On 10 October 2007, members of the SFSS achieved the quorum of over 500 at the annual general meeting; three major by-laws changes occurred. Graduate students, who had previously voted for full independence in March, would no longer be members of the Simon Fraser Student Society as of September 2008. Graduate students were the majority of attendees and had an interest in the above amendment, shown by their unusually high turnout. A motion to lower quorum from 500 to 250 passed with 77%, and another resolution passed giving members of SFSS the ability to vote on future by-law changes by referendums as well as at general meetings.

=== Impeachment ===
In July 2006, the Board of Directors directed seven full-time SFSS staff members to go on leave with pay and benefits while an investigation into internal issues was carried out. The investigation lasted a total of 5 working days. SFSS keys and email passwords were confiscated and computers were searched. Staff were directed not to enter SFSS property until directed otherwise. In August, a staff member was fired as a result of the investigation. Directors outlined in Board meetings on July 26, August 9, and August 23 that they were bound by confidentiality in their collective agreement with CUPE 5396, and could not disclose the justifications for terminating the employee. However, they iterated that they had just cause and that they were prepared to go to arbitration. These Directors later illegally disclosed the supposed reason during classroom speaking sessions which were recorded as part of a regular lecture recording. A 2007 article in 'Upping the Anti' quoted "an elected officer of the SFSS" as having stated to a colleague that "[w]e don’t trust her" because "[s]he attempted to bring speculation upon the CFS at the CFS conference in May by publicly asking inappropriate questions during some of the meetings." The fired employee was later reinstated and arbitration results included full retroactive pay.

An organisation called Students for a Democratic University instigated a petition for a special general meeting under the SFSS's bylaws and the Society Act of British Columbia that called for the impeachment of seven directors and two bylaw changes that would alter funding and decision-making authority within the SFSS. The petition had signatures from 9.8% of all students, exceeding the 5% required to call a meeting, per an SFSS bylaw. Despite this, the directors up for impeachment insisted the petition was insufficient, quoting the Society Act, which said a call for a meeting required 10% to sign a petition.

A special general meeting (called by Forum) of the SFSS was held on October 25, 2006 in the school's Convocation Mall. 1028 students attended overall (up to 760 at the same time) at the Special General Meeting, and voted in favour of motions to impeach the seven directors and to two amendments to the bylaws of the society.

In response, the seven directors claimed that the special general meeting was invalid by claiming the Forum meeting used to call the special general meeting itself was invalid, and issued guidelines to the staff of the SFSS. They asked the Supreme Court of British Columbia to declare the impeachments invalid. The bank account of the SFSS was frozen due to the controversy over who were the legitimate directors of the SFSS. This issue was resolved on November 23, 2006, with a court order enforcing an agreement between the impeached directors and the remaining directors.

While President Shawn Hunsdale has resigned after his impeachment, he maintained his claim that the special general meeting that impeached him is invalid. The President of the University itself, Michael Stevenson, stated that until the Supreme Court of BC made a decision, students, as well as the impeached directors, should respect the SGM.

In December 2006, the BC Supreme Court ruled that the special general meeting and impeachment were legitimate and there was no issue with the Forum. The court also stated that in the event that there was a problem with the Forum, the petition was sufficient and should have been followed, and assigned all costs to the individual impeached directors.

In December 2019, another SFSS President was impeached.

=== Canadian Federation of Students ===
In March 2007 the Simon Fraser Student Society conducted a non-binding plebiscite where over 75% of voting members voted to leave the CFS. The power of this plebiscite to give a clear mandate was questioned by some. The referendum was held in conjunction with the general election of 2007.

After this plebiscite the SFSS engaged in the regular defederation process, collecting over 3000 signatures during the summer semester for a defederation vote six months hence.

In the vote, which was held in March 2008, students again voted to leave by a 67% majority.

The status of the 2008 referendum, overseen by then-student and Independent Electoral Commission CEO J.J. McCullough, remained in dispute by both parties, with the SFSS maintaining it was no longer a member of the CFS and the CFS maintaining that it was. Both the CFS and SFSS petitioned the courts to have their arguments legally upheld. SFSS then recommended to other student governments that they avoid membership within the Canadian Federation of Students. As of December 2011, the Simon Fraser Student Society and the CFS had reached an out of court resolution. As part of the resolution, it was agreed that the SFSS membership in the CFS had ended.

=== Equity Based Student Groups Given Eviction Notices ===
In 2018, the Simon Fraser Student Society (SFSS) gave eviction notices to several student groups from the Rotunda Community at Simon Fraser University (SFU), including the Simon Fraser Public Interest Research Group, the CJSF Campus Public Radio, the Students of Caribbean and African Ancestry (SOCA), First Nations Metis and Inuit Student Association (FNMISA). SOCA and FNMISA are equity-seeking groups advocating for reconciliation, redressing of wrongs, social and racial equity, inclusivity, representation, and community-building and Indigenous sovereignty. The eviction notices followed a series of consultations and events, all groups initially believing they would be allocated space in the new Student Union Building (SUB). However, due to miscommunications and inconsistencies in the process, these groups were left without dedicated spaces. This led to much media coverage and campus outcry.

The affected groups (CJSF, SOCA, FNMISA, SFPIRG), argue that the eviction is an example of institutional racism, as it disproportionately impacts racialized and marginalized student communities. Despite exhausting all internal avenues to address the issue, the SFSS did not provide the groups with adequate solutions.

Timeline: - Groups in the Rotunda faced losing space due to the SFSS's lease for the Rotunda going back to SFU. - While building the SUB, groups believed they would move into the SUB under the SFSS lease-lessee agreement. - The SFSS reneged on this and issued eviction notices without alternative spaces in the SUB as agreed. - A two-year battle for space on campus ensued, ending in 2020 with all groups securing space and lease agreements after the support of the SFSS advisory Council and many campus groups. - Save Our Spaces was started by supportive students, leading to the Save Student Spaces campaign by the groups, covered extensively by the Peak the campus newspaper. - By the end of 2020, SOCA, FNMISA, CJSF, SFPIRG, and The Peak secured spaces where a compromise agreement was reached, offering space in the new Student Union Building for Rotunda groups after much protest from students. - A new agreement was signed after a pro-space and pro-equity student party entered the SFSS in 2020, ensuring long-term space agreements for SOCA, DNA, SFPIRG, CJSF, FNMISA, The Peak, WC, and OOC. - The SFSS passes in 2025 new referendums allowing increase in its health care plan, and in 2026 general increase of its membership fees.

== See also ==
- List of British Columbia students' associations
- Simon Fraser University
