= Alliance of Nova Scotia Student Associations =

- Successor: Students Nova Scotia
- Formation: 2003
- Dissolved: August 2012
- Location: Halifax, Nova Scotia
- Members: SMUSA, DSU, ASU, ASTSU, StFX SU, CBUSU
- Affiliations: CASA, ANSSA
- Website: anssa.ca

The Alliance of Nova Scotia Student Associations (ANSSA) was the largest post-secondary student advocacy group in Nova Scotia, Canada and the largest student organization in the Atlantic Provinces. In 2012 it was renamed Students Nova Scotia. The organization historically represented 80-87% of the province's university students. It worked towards improved funding for education in Nova Scotia and the elimination of real and perceived financial barriers for university students.

ANSSA's member organizations were the Dalhousie Student Union, the Acadia Students' Union, the Atlantic School of Theology Students' Union, the St. Francis Xavier University Students' Union, the Saint Mary's University Students' Association, and the Cape Breton University Student Union.

== Formation ==
In 2003 the Nova Scotia Student Advocacy Coalition (NSSAC) collapsed as a result of ideological differences between the Canadian Federation of Students and Canadian Alliance of Student Associations schools within the organization. Schools who were members of the CFS largely remained affiliated with that group's provincial wing, but the DSU, ASU, STFXSU, and SMUSA—as members of CASA—were left without a provincial lobby group.

Talks between those schools led to the establishment of ANSSA in April 2004. SMUSA entered the alliance until that fall, following a successful referendum and the ASTSU that same year. CBUSU joined in 2009 after voting to leave the CFS.

In August 2012, ANSSA's board of directors voted to change their name as part of a series of larger governance reforms, and alongside an expansion of the organization's research and engagement capacities. The organization took on the new name, Students Nova Scotia.
