= Council of Alberta University Students =

Students Union

- Location: Edmonton, Alberta
- Established: 1986
- Members: 140,000
- Affiliations: CASA
- Website: www.caus.net

The Council of Alberta University Students (CAUS) was a provincial advocacy organization till 2025 representing undergraduate students at several public universities in Alberta, Canada. Based in Edmonton, the organization advocates on issues related to post-secondary education policy, including tuition, student financial aid, and institutional funding. CAUS represents the interests of more than 90,000 undergraduate students through its member students’ unions and associations.

As of the mid-2020s, CAUS member organizations include the students’ unions or associations of the University of Alberta, University of Lethbridge, Mount Royal University, and Athabasca University. Through these members, CAUS represents undergraduate students to the Government of Alberta, the public, and other post-secondary education stakeholders.

The organization describes itself as a non-partisan advocacy body focused on promoting a high-quality, accessible system of post-secondary education in Alberta. Its governing board is composed of representatives from each member students’ union, typically including elected student executives responsible for government relations.

== History ==
The Council of Alberta University Students (CAUS) was created in 1986 after the disintegration of the Federation of Alberta Students (FAS). FAS was a provincial umbrella organization that represented all of the public post-secondary institutions in Alberta; the organization fell apart in 1981 when a number of colleges and technical institutes withdrew their membership from the organization because they felt that the universities dominated the Federation. Out of the ashes of the FAS emerged CAUS, which included all of the publicly funded universities in Alberta, and ACTISEC (Alberta Colleges and Technical Institutes Student Executive Council), which represented all of the publicly funded colleges and technical institutes and later became the Alberta Students' Executive Council (ASEC).

The original purpose of CAUS was to facilitate information sharing and networking between university students' unions and associations. Since then, the emphasis of the organization has gone from being a networking group to an active lobbying and advocacy coalition.

In 2014, the student associations of Mount Royal University and MacEwan University became CAUS members, bringing the membership to five. In 2020, the Athabasca University Student Union became the sixth member.

== See also ==
- List of Alberta students' associations
