= The Quill (newspaper) =

Student newspaper in Manitoba, Canada

The Quill is the official student newspaper of Brandon University in Brandon, Manitoba, first published in December 1910, making it one of the oldest student newspapers in Canada.

== Overview and history ==
The Quill was first published in 1910, and is the second oldest student newspaper in western Canada (The Gateway at The University of Alberta is older by two months). It was also the first student run publication at Brandon College, created as a response to the growth in the college at the time.

The Quill was originally published three times a year, and then quarterly, with a hope of establishing itself and then becoming a weekly paper. In 1927, the Brandon College Publishing Board split the paper into two separate publications - The Quill, a biweekly newspaper, and The Sickle, a yearbook. In 1933, The Quill moved to a broadsheet format, but this was abandoned in the 1934-1935 year. Weekly publication was introduced in 1963 (although it had been weekly as early as 1937). It has sporadically changed from weekly to biweekly and to different formats and printers many times since then.

The Quill has been financed primarily through funding from BUSU, and at present, advertising and a student levy. In 1997, The Quill became one of the first student newspapers in Canada to produce the paper in a completely digital format.

The Quill has been located at a number of locations on campus. Its first home was at the base of the Bell Tower in the original Clark Hall. In the 1970s it was produced in a mobile trailer near the gymnasium, before moving to the former Students' Union office in the lower level of the McMaster Building in 1980. Finally in 1991, the Quill was moved to its current location on the second floor of the Knowles-Douglas Student Centre.

The Quill continues to be a member of the Canadian University Press. As a democratic collective, The Quill is open to all students and staff at Brandon University. An autonomous corporate entity since 2005, The Quill is a student run publication; the articles, editing, layout and distribution are done by the students.

== Notable editors ==
- Dr. Stanley Knowles, New Democratic Party Member of Parliament
- Trent Frayne, Sports Journalist
- Brian Ransom, Member of Progressive Conservative Party of Manitoba, 1977–1986
- Dan Bjarnson, CBC Reporter and author

== See also ==
- List of student newspapers in Canada
- List of newspapers in Canada
