= Undergraduates of Canadian Research Intensive Universities =

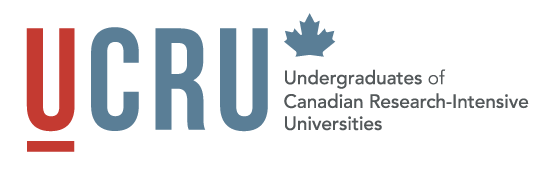
- Abbreviation: UCRU
- Formation: 2017
- Location: Ottawa, Canada.
- Region served: Canada
- Chair: Katie Georgia Traynor (WUSA)
- Vice-Chair & Director of Operations: Tina Tong (AMS)
- Director of Policy: Abigail Samuels (MSU)
- Affiliations: U15, CASA, Student Mental Health Canada
- Website: undergraduatescru.wixsite.com/ucru

The Undergraduates of Canadian Research Intensive Universities (UCRU) is an alliance of students' unions in Canada. Their common objective is to protect the interests and advocate on behalf of over 240,000 undergraduate university students from Canada's largest research intensive universities (U15), and to provide research and recommendations to the government on how to improve post-secondary education in Canada. The UCRU began as an informal association called ADVOCAN, and was formalized and rebranded in late 2017. The Waterloo Undergraduate Student association left the organization in 2025.

== Membership ==
The nine member associations of the UCRU are:

- Western University’s Student Council (USC) – Western University
- McMaster Students Union (MSU) – McMaster University
- Alma Mater Society (AMS) – Queen's University
- University of Toronto Student Union (UTSU) – University of Toronto
- Alma Mater Society of UBC Vancouver (AMS-UBC) – University of British Columbia
- University of Saskatchewan Students’ Union (USSU) – University of Saskatchewan
- Student's Society of McGill University (SSMU) – McGill University
- University of Ottawa's Students' Union (UOSU) – University of Ottawa

== Advocacy Topics ==
- Indigenous Students
- International Students
- Canada Federal Student Loans Program
- Undergraduate Research Funding

== Advocacy 2024 Topics ==
- Housing
- Student Financial Aid
- Mental Health

== See also ==
- Canadian Alliance of Student Associations (CASA)
- Canadian Federation of Students (CFS)
