= Students Nova Scotia =

Canadian student association alliance

Students Nova Scotia (StudentsNS)
- Predecessor: Alliance of Nova Scotia Student Associations
- Formation: August 2012
- Location: Halifax, Nova Scotia
- Members: Acadia Students' Union; St. Francis Xavier University Students' Union; Saint Mary's University Students' Association; Cape Breton University Students' Union
- Executive Director: Brendan Roberts
- Board Chair: Rebecca Seymour
- Board Vice-Chair: Zahide Cam
- Key people: Brendan Roberts; Rebecca Seymour; Zahide Cam
- Main organ: Board of Directors
- Affiliations: CASA, Student Mental Health Canada
- Staff: 2
- Website: www.studentsns.ca
- Formerly called: Alliance of Nova Scotia Student Associations (ANSSA)

Students Nova Scotia (Students NS), formerly known as the Alliance of Nova Scotia Student Associations (ANSSA), is an alliance of some Nova Scotia post-secondary student associations. Its stated aim is to give students a voice in Nova Scotia with government and the public, helping set the direction of post-secondary education by researching challenges, identifying solutions, and creating the political space needed for these solutions to happen.

Its six member associations represent close to 20,000 students on campuses across the province.

StudentsNS is governed by a board of directors composed of presidents and vice-presidents from each member association. The executive director manages the day-to-day operations of the organization's staff.

== History ==
Students Nova Scotia or StudentsNS was founded in 2003 as the Alliance of Nova Scotia Student Associations (ANSSA). At that time, students had identified an urgent need for a united voice in Nova Scotia, where they faced the highest tuition in Canada, underfunded universities, no needs-based grants, all leading to a steady decline in enrolment levels across the province.

The Acadia Students' Union, Dalhousie Student Union, Saint Mary's University Students' Association, and the St. Francis Xavier University Students' Union together established ANSSA. The Cape Breton University Students’ Union joined ANSSA in 2009, the Atlantic School of Theology Students Union became a full member in 2011, the Dalhousie Agricultural Students Association in 2013, and the Nova Scotia Community College Student Association at Kingstech joined in 2014.

The new organization was formed to advocate on behalf of students with all levels of government, with institutions, in the media, and within Nova Scotia communities. It was, and is, focused on post-secondary education across the province, not just on single campuses.

In 2012, members overwhelmingly approved a funding increase in support of ANSSA, paving the way for the organization to substantially increase research, media and engagement capacities, notably by hiring two additional staff. To better facilitate the use of these increased resources, in 2012 ANSSA also pursued significant restructuring, and renamed itself Students Nova Scotia.

On Friday February 27, 2015, the Dalhousie Student Union council passed a motion to disaffiliate from SNS.
