= Canada Corps =

Canada Corps was a program created by the Canadian Government with the purpose of improving good governance and institution building in developing and unstable countries. The programme was administered by the Canadian International Development Agency (CIDA), under the authority of the Minister for International Cooperation.

== Purpose ==
In the October 2004 Speech from the Throne, one element of the Canada Corps mandate highlighted the need to "help young Canadians bring their enthusiasm and energy to the world."

Canada Corps was built on four goals:

- Mobilization of Canadians to go abroad
- Public engagement
- Coherence of governance programming
- Expansion of Canada's governance base of knowledge.

== Governance ==
All Canada Corps programs focused on governance, which was at the time defined as central to any political economy because it deals with the institutions, processes, and relationships necessary to moving a society forward. Governance was also understood to be a central part of sustainable development and poverty reduction.

Programming in governance involved a wide range of topic areas: democracy, elections and parliaments, a fair and impartial judiciary, mechanisms to respect and protect human rights, an effective and transparent public sector, and a stable and reliable security system to protect people and resolve conflict fairly and peacefully. Good governance is also an integral component of private-sector development, creating an environment that enables economic growth.

At the provincial and national level, Canada Corps desired to help build on lasting institutions, enabling countries to take charge of their own development. At the regional or local level, Canada Corps helped local governments respond better to citizens' needs.

== Missions ==
The first mission of the program was to send a delegation of approximately 500 Canadians as election observers to the December 26 2004 Ukrainian presidential election. Since then, they have served as international observers in a number of other nations, notably the February 2006 Presidential Elections in Haiti and the January 2006 Palestinian Parliamentary Elections. Canada Corps also had a partnership with NetCorps.

Despite its commitment to building a knowledge base on governance, not a single one of the 500 observers to the 2004 Ukrainian elections was asked to write an after-action report.

== Evolution ==
In October 2006, Canada's newly elected Conservative government replaced Canada Corps with the new Office for Democratic Governance (ODG). Subsequently, various programs were cut and others restructured. The ODG took over most Canada Corps responsibilities for supporting CIDA programming in the following pillars of democratic governance:

- Human Rights
- Accountable Public Institutions
- Freedom and Democracy
- Rule of Law

The ODG was dissolved shortly thereafter.

== See also ==
- GlobalMedic
- Katimavik
