= Royal Roads University Student Association =

Student association in Victoria, Canada

Royal Roads University Student Association (RRUSA)
- Institution: Royal Roads University
- Location: 2005 Sooke Rd; Victoria, British Columbia; V9B 5Y2
- Established: 1999
- President: Riley Huntley
- Members: ~ 800 Undergraduate students
- Website: rrusa.ca

Royal Roads University Student Association (RRUSA) is a not-for-profit organization representing interests of undergraduate students studying at Royal Roads University in Victoria, British Columbia.

== History ==
The organization, independent of Royal Roads University, was established in 1999. In 2015, RRUSA was incorporated under the British Columbia Societies Act.

== Initiatives ==
In 2012, RRUSA applied for and successfully received C$172,700 in funding from the Government of Canada through Status of Women Canada to prevent violence on campus.

== See also ==
- List of British Columbia students' associations
