= New Brunswick Student Alliance =

- Location: Fredericton, New Brunswick
- Established: 1982-2025
- President: Patrick Hickey (Chair, UNB-SRC)
- Vice president: Sarah Kohut (Vice-Chair, STUSU)
- Members: 4 (12,500 students)
- Affiliations: CASA
- Website: www.nbsa-aenb.ca

The New Brunswick Student Alliance is a student driven organization that advocates for more than 12,000 post-secondary students across New Brunswick.

== History ==
The New Brunswick Student Alliance/L'Alliance étudiante du Nouveau-Brunswick (NBSA/AÉNB) is a bilingual student advocacy organization which operates in New Brunswick, Canada. Representing over 12,000 post-secondary students at four university campuses across the province, the NBSA works to convey student issues, concerns, and perspectives to the provincial, federal and inter-provincial government. The NBSA works with the province, university administrators and faculty, and other stakeholders toward its goal of an affordable, accessible, and high-quality post-secondary education system in New Brunswick.

The organization was first established in 1982 as the New Brunswick Coalition of Students. It was founded to better reflect the diversity and needs of New Brunswick post-secondary students than other student organizations that existed in New Brunswick at the time.

In 1983, the NBCS became the NBSA. The organization continued to develop its identity, governance model, and public image throughout the 1980s. In 1986, the NBSA experienced its first major policy success in the awarding of two student representative seats on the Maritime Provinces Higher Education Commission. Shortly thereafter, the NBSA experienced a decline in participation and folded temporarily.

The 1990s were marked by major cutbacks to the post-secondary education system in New Brunswick. By 1995, the need for a province-based student advocacy movement had resurged and the NBSA was reassembled. The NBSA gained significant exposure in years that followed. It successfully formed relationships with each of the province's major political parties, seeing all party leaders sign a pledge to help post-secondary students prior to the 1998 New Brunswick election.

The NBSA hired its first executive director in the mid-2000s. The organization went on to advocate for the creation of a Post-Secondary Education Commission and a separate government ministry for post-secondary education. In 2006, the NBSA embarked on a large scale campaign to raise awareness of student issues by hosting a “Day of Action,” which saw television, radio, and media ads run during the 2006 provincial election.

A new Post-Secondary Education Commission commenced in 2007. The NBSA recommended a debt cap, improved repayment options for student loans, and tuition regulation. In 2008, the NBSA held demonstrations across the province calling for a cap on student loan debt. In that year's budget, the provincial government announced the creation of the Timely Completion Benefit that capped student debt at $26,000 and introduced a new repayment assistance program for recent graduates.

In 2010, the Board of Directors eliminated the executive director position, electing to operate on a reduced budget without staff support. In 2013, the position was reinstated.

In recent years, the NBSA has re-emerged as a strong voice for post-secondary students in New Brunswick. It has built upon existing relationships with each of the province's major political parties, and has successfully forged new relationships with government, university administrators, and faculty associations. The NBSA has been very vocal in the past as New Brunswick went through multiple initiatives to report and improve on its post-secondary education system. These include the Commission on Post-secondary Education report "Advantage New Brunswick: A province reaches to fulfill its destiny, the Working Group Report and the final Government of New Brunswick "Action Plan to Transform Post-secondary Education". In addition to being active during the 2014 provincial election, the organization continues to actively meet with Members of the Legislative Assembly (MLAs) to provide elected officials with a look into the post-secondary student experience, and to provide suggestions for improving the system in the short- and long-term.

The NBSA's current policy positions include strategic investments in student financial aid, the elimination of in-study and summer earnings assessments, and an expansion of experiential learning opportunities. In the face of a struggling provincial economy, the NBSA continues to work with all stakeholders toward a better post-secondary system and a stronger New Brunswick.

== Structure and staff ==
The current organizational structure consists of two elected executives and a full-time executive director, working out of an office in Fredericton, New Brunswick. The two executive positions may be held by any student who is a member. The Board of Directors of the NBSA consists, in general, of the Vice-president Externals of member student unions (or VP Education in the case of the St. Thomas University Students' Union) as the voting members and the associated Presidents as observers. All student members are permitted to attend Board meetings and/or participate on committees.

=== Executive director ===
- Daniel Mordi

=== Executive team ===
- Chair: Emily Boucher (St. Thomas University Students' Union)
- Vice-chair: Alivia Warr (Mount Allison Students' Union)

=== Current members ===
- Mount Allison Students’ Union (MASU)
- University of New Brunswick Saint John Student Representative Council (UNB SRC)
- St. Thomas University Students' Union (STUSU)

== Past executive directors ==
2019-2020: Kjeld-Mizpah (KJ) Conyers-Steede
2018-2019: Emily Blue
2017-2018: Samuel Titus
2016-2017: Robert Burroughs
2015-2016: Lindsay Handren
2013-2015: Patrick Joyce
2009-2010: Mélissa Cormier
2007-2009: Heather Elliott
2005-2007: Claude Haché
