= Robert G. Greenhill =

Robert Gordon Greenhill (born 1962) is a Canadian businessman, civil servant and expert on international development.

== Career ==
Greenhill began his career at McKinsey & Company in 1987. He then joined Bombardier Inc. in 1995, and as vice president Strategic Initiatives, was recognised as Canada's Top 40 under 40 in 1998. In 2001, he became president of Bombardier's International Group and held that role until 2004.

In 2002, he co-founded the Banff Forum, one of Canada’s preeminent public policy forums that brings together every year 200 leaders from across Canada and leading thinkers from around the world to share their knowledge, enhance their leadership skills, build national networks, and discuss and debate the most pressing issues facing Canada today.

In 2004, Greenhill joined the International Development Research Centre as Senior Visiting Executive, producing a critical account of Canada's global engagement "Making A Difference?". Greenhill's study was seen as evidence that Canada was playing only "a marginal role in international affairs."

In 2005, Greenhill was appointed president of the Canadian International Development Agency (CIDA), and Deputy Minister for International Cooperation during the 27th Canadian Ministry. Greenhill oversaw changes to CIDA's programming. Food aid was 100% untied by April 2008. Greenhill was also engaged in Haiti, unveiling a 5-year $520 million commitment in 2006.

In 2006, United Nations Secretary-General Kofi Annan named Greenhill to the High-level Panel on United Nations Systemwide Coherence. The panel's final report Delivering as One outlined strategies for greater management coherence and effectiveness in UN efforts in the areas of the environment, development and humanitarian assistance. Greenhill also helped draft recommendations that led to the creation of UN Women. His contribution was commended by Canadian women's groups.

In 2008, Greenhill joined the Geneva-based World Economic Forum (WEF) as Managing Director and Chief Business Officer. Greenhill engaged with key global business leaders on how to improve the role of business in society and was instrumental in the creation of the Forum of Young Global Leaders.

In 2014, Greenhill returned to Montreal to found Global Canada, a multistakeholder initiative committed to improving Canada's global impact. In September 2015 Greenhill co-authored "Assessing Canada's Global Engagement Gap". The report focused attention on Canada's international role during the 2015 Federal election, pointing out that in "defence and development spending, Canada has done poorly compared with its G7 partners".

He is currently Professor of Practice at the Institute for the Study of International Development, McGill University, and member of the Board of Directors of the King Baudouin Foundation (KBF)-Canada and of the Advisory Board of the Banff Forum.

== Education ==
Greenhill has a BA in political science from the University of Alberta (1984), where he was twice the university's Student Union president, being the youngest ever at 20 years old and elected to this position during a crisis that threatened to bankrupt the organization. He has an MA in international history from the London School of Economics (1986), and an MBA from INSEAD (1987).
