= University of Victoria Students' Society =

Undergraduate student union at the University of Victoria

- Formation: 1921 (Incorporated 1964)
- Location: Victoria, British Columbia
- Members: 19,000+
- Key people: Director of Outreach & University Relations: Bunni Williams; Director of Student Affairs: Hemal Sharma; Director of Finance & Operations: Khushi Wadhwa; Director of Events: Sarah Buchanan; Director of Campaigns & Community Relations: Isabelle Easton; Director of International Student Relations: Harshita Sankar
- Affiliations: University of Victoria
- Website: uvss.ca
- Formerly called: Alma Mater Society

The University of Victoria Students' Society (UVSS) is a student union that represents undergraduate students at the University of Victoria. The students' society was founded in 1921 and incorporated in 1964. It provides services and operates business for students through the Student Union Building (SUB), and historically has advocated for special interests on campus.

== Governance ==
=== Board of directors ===
The Board of Directors is the decision-making body for the Society and directs all work of the Society. The board is composed of student representatives elected from the student body. The board is made up of:

- Five salaried executives:
  - Director of Outreach & University Relations,
  - Director of Student Affairs,
  - Director of Finance & Operations,
  - Director of Events, and;
  - Director of Campaigns & Community Relations
- A Director of International Student Relations,
- 2 Directors at-large,
- 9 Faculty Directors; and,
- Five advocacy group representatives:
  - The Native Students' Union,
  - Pride Collective,
  - The Students of Colour Collective,
  - The Society for Students with a Disability, and;
  - Gender Empowerment Centre (GEM)

=== Elections ===
Board members are elected annually in March and advocacy representatives are nominated by their groups and approved by the board.

Up until 2009, the elections to the UVSS Board of Directors were run internally by a committee of the Society and staff members. Since that time, the UVSS has changed its by-laws and has given much of its authority to run the elections away to externally hired individuals. Policy for the elections is still determined by the Board of Directors.

== History ==
=== Founding ===
The Students' Society was first incorporated in 1964, just one year after the creation of the University of Victoria (UVic) itself, as the Alma Mater Society of the University of Victoria (AMS). The AMS took its name from student associations like the University of British Columbia and McGill University, to which Victoria College (UVic's predecessor) was affiliated. The name was changed in 1989 to make clearer what the organization actually is, a student society.

Students at the newly founded UVic already had their own building and a ready-made students' society, as students at Victoria College (now the home of Camosun College) were organized well before the UVic campus opened. As early as 1957, students at Victoria College began levying a building fee in anticipation of their new home at UVic. Consequently, the Student Union Building (SUB) was one of the first buildings built on campus. The SUB opened in 1963, built with matching funds made available by the provincial government's building fund program. The building itself only consisted of the SUB Upper Lounge, the wing where the General Office is now located, and a downstairs section which housed the original Felicita's Pub.

Between 1963 and 1970, membership in the Society was around two thousand students. There were only four buildings on campus and in 1967, when the residence buildings went up, only 300 students lived on campus. The Society at that time was mostly operated by volunteers and a very small staff. However, towards the end of the sixties, the Society began to grow more sophisticated. By the seventies, the cafeteria (previously more of a kiosk) began operating regularly, the Society got a liquor license, and the pub increased its hours. What is now Cinecenta got its start with students, working out of an office in the SUB, showing movies using a 16mm projector in the MacLaurin and Elliot buildings.

In 1976 the building expanded, again financed through students. This time, however, the fee referendum to finance the additional 30 000 square feet failed. The Society's operating budget could only finance a smaller addition of 13 000 square feet, which meant that many of the architectural features originally designed for the expansion were lost. The 1976 addition saw the wing where Cinecenta and the Munchie Bar, Medicine Centre Pharmacy, Chiropractor, and On the Fringe are now located. Also the third floor was added as the home of CFUV (now located in the SUB's lower level).

=== 1980s and 1990s ===
The Society's organizational structure changed significantly in 1989. At this point, the Society began employing its own general manager. In the fall of 1989, the entire structure of the Society was reorganized into the divisional structure, which exists with some modifications today.

The Student Initiatives Project, approved by referendum in 1991, consisted of a significant fee increase to finance the expansion and renovation of the SUB, to build a campus Day Care building, and to finance an Emergency Student Aid Fund. The completion of the expansion and renovation of the SUB in 1996 was another significant marker in the history of the Society. The SUB as it is known today is a product of that expansion.

=== 2000s ===
The growth and change of the 1990s led to a worsening financial situation which reached a crisis point in 2001. The Society had been running deficits every year for about 10 years until the cumulative deficit had reached the hundreds of thousands. The Society rang up a $400,000 deficit in a single year in 2000–2001. The deficit was only discovered during the Society's annual audit in fall 2001, as Business & Operations Manager Vivek Sharma, had been falsifying statements and stealing from the Society. The Board responded by pressing charges against the since resigned Sharma, terminating the General Manager, and conducting a forensic audit.

The Board of Directors began to tighten controls in the SUB's business operations by such methods as reducing labour costs and food wastage, controlling liquor, and putting locks on freezers and coolers to prevent theft. The Society also secured a half-million dollar loan from UVic against the SUB, which was instrumental in ensuring that the Society was able to meet its financial obligations without interruption. As the 2001–2002 financial year was already half over when the financial crisis was uncovered, the Society could not escape another deficit in the hundreds of thousands. However, beginning in 2002–2003 the Society ran surpluses every year until the Society's debt of approximately $1 million was repaid in full in 2006–2007.

In 2008 the United Steel Workers union representing staff at the UVSS went on strike for a three months, this in combination with a weak economy, and rising costs pushed the Society back into a $350,000 debt by 2009.

=== 2010-present ===
To address the growing deficit and put the Society back on its feet, the 2010-2011 board put a number of fee referendums to members in November 2010, all of which passed. The Capital Fund was reduced and shifted into the Operations Fund, dedicated fees for events and elections were established, and a modest increase of 40 cents per full-time student per semester, each semester over a three-year period was also established. Besides this, the 2010-2011 board shifted from a three-person senior management structure to a two-person management structure which further reduced costs for the Society.

In 2010-11, the Board moved from a 4-person executive structure to a 5-person executive structure. This change was passed at a Special General Meeting in January 2010 and was largely done in acknowledgement of the fact that certain executive positions had an inordinate amount of work in comparison to other positions.

Major changes on the political front happened in the early twenty-tens as well. After holding a referendum on membership in the Canadian Federation of Students, UVSS members voted to leave the Federation in March 2011 after more than twenty-five years of membership. Following this, the UVSS established the Where's The Funding? campaign in conjunction with a number of other student societies in BC.

In recent years, the divestment movement has been a primary focus for UVSS campaigns.

== Student groups ==
=== Clubs ===
Clubs are interest groups run by students and administered by the UVSS. There are over 150 student groups on a variety of topics.

Clubs receive a small amount of funding each semester from a student levy and are governed by clubs policy and Clubs Council.

=== Course Unions ===
Course Unions are department focused student groups run by students from a specific department and administered by the UVSS. There are over 25 Course Unions representing departments across campus, a list of all active clubs can be found on the UVSS Course Union Website. Any student that wants to start a Course Union can do so by talking to the Director of Student Affairs who has an office located in the Students' Society Centre (SUB B103)

Course Unions receive a small amount of funding each semester from a student levy and are governed by Course Union policy and Course Union council.

=== Professional Development Unions (PDUs) ===
There are four active Professional Development Unions at the University of Victoria. Each PDU is run semi-autonomously with funds being raised solely by the students within that department. While each PDU raises its own funds, they are considered under the umbrella of the UVSS for purposes related to the University Act (British Columbia).

=== Advocacy Groups ===
Advocacy groups are organizations within the UVSS serve to represent certain special interests on campus or within society. Advocacy groups are funded by imposing fees on students that are created through by referendum. Each of the groups has voting representation on the UVSS Board of Directors.

== Affiliate organizations ==
Affiliate organizations are on-campus groups that receive a student levy that has been approved by referendum. All of the affiliate groups act semi-autonomously with their own governing structures.

=== The Martlet ===
The Martlet is a bi-weekly student newspaper at the University of Victoria (UVic) in Victoria, British Columbia, Canada. There are over a dozen employees on the payroll, but significant work is done by student volunteers (writing, taking photos, copy editing). The Martlet is funded partially by student fees, and partially by advertisements. The newspaper is distributed freely around the UVic campus and various locations around greater Victoria every second Thursday during the school year, and on a monthly basis in the summer. The paper also maintains a website. The Martlet was a member of the Canadian University Press but ceased membership in 2013.

=== CFUV 101.9FM ===
CFUV is a campus/community radio station broadcasting on 101.9 FM in British Columbia, Canada. It serves the University of Victoria, Greater Victoria and, via cable, Vancouver Island and many areas in the Lower Mainland. It is owned and run by the University of Victoria Student Radio Society. The station offers programs that include a diverse range of musical styles and talk shows on political and cultural issues.

=== Vancouver Island Public Interest Research Group (VIPIRG) ===
VIPIRG is a non-profit organization dedicated to research, education, advocacy and action in the public interest.

VIPIRG also hosts an alternative research centre with magazines, videos, books and clippings dealing with a wide range of social justice and environmental issues.

=== UVic Sustainability Project (UVSP) ===
UVSP is a student-run organization that strives to work with the campus community to achieve a balance between what is ecologically necessary, socially desirable and economically feasible at UVic.

=== UVic Campus Community Gardens ===
The Campus Community Garden is a UVSS club that manages the urban agriculture space on campus, with practical support from Facilities Management and the UVic Sustainability Office. The garden is located off of Mckenzie Avenue across from the athletic fields. There are 90 plots at the gardens. Due to the high demand for plots, rentals are restricted to current UVic students, faculty and staff, though volunteers from outside the UVic community are welcome.

== Services ==
=== Universal Bus Pass (U-PASS) ===
The Universal Bus Pass (U-PASS), started in 1999, allows students unlimited travel on the Victoria Regional Transit System. The Pass must be renewed each semester at either the University Centre or the Info Booth in the SUB and costs the equivalent of one adult monthly pass.

=== Anti-Violence Project (AVP) ===
The Anti-Violence Project (AVP) is the on-campus sexual assault centre. The support services are confidential and available to anyone who has experienced sexualized violence or knows someone who has.

=== Food Bank ===
Rising tuition costs and debt loads signalled an increase in the needs of the membership and in September 2000, the Board of Directors began funding and operating an emergency food bank in the SUB. By 2003, demand had increased substantially and a referendum approved a $0.50 per student levy to operate the food bank.

=== Health and Dental Plan ===
Established by student referendum, the UVSS Health and Dental Plan is extended health and dental coverage specifically for students. All undergraduate students who are registered in at least 3 units of on-campus classes are automatically enrolled in the health plan.

=== Ombudsperson ===
The Office of the Ombudsperson is an independent, impartial, and confidential resource for undergraduate and graduate students (current, former, or prospective) and other members of the University community.

The Office provides information and guidance on students' rights & responsibilities, and UVic regulations & procedures. The Ombudsperson is also an "agent for change," recommending improvements to policies and advocating for fair procedures. The ombuds office also offers workshops and talks on conflict and communication, fairness, and related issues.

=== Other services ===
Though the Student Union Building, the UVSS also offers free phones, a banner room, a darkroom, and study space.

== Controversies ==
- 2008-2013 Youth Protecting Youth (YPY) was an anti-abortion club at UVic and funded by students. Over the past few years there have been a number of discussions and controversies relating to their activities on-campus. In 2008 and 2009 funding was cut off as a result of the groups posters and activities. In 2010 funding and ratification were lost as a result of continuing controversial activities. In 2010 YPY launched a lawsuit against the UVSS where they were given back their withheld funding and ratification. YPY lost their booking privileges in spring 2012 because of a graphic display held on campus. YPY has since filed a constitutional lawsuit against UVic in relation to a cancelled booking in February 2013. An out-of-court settlement was agreed and as of 2017, YPY is a regular student club which participates in standard events such as "clubs day".
- 2010 Fraternities and Sororities were looking to get recognised by UVic and the UVSS. This resulted in one of the largest AGMs in UVSS history where students ultimately decided to not recognize the Fraternities and Sororities. The groups do continue to exist without the University recognition.
- 2009-2012 From 1985 to 2011 the UVSS was member local 44 of the Canadian Federation of Students. In late 2009, a petition was circulated among the membership to demand a referendum on continued membership. Despite having reached the required number of signatures, the CFS denied that the petition was valid. The UVSS retained a lawyer on behalf of the membership in order to demand a legal referendum. In March 2011, 70.5% of UVic students voted in a referendum to leave the CFS. The UVSS's membership in CFS-National ended on June 30, 2011. The provincial component of the CFS, CFS-BC, has since removed the UVSS as a member.
- The UVSS received two F's in the Justice Centre for Constitutional Freedom's report The State of Campus Free Speech in 2012.
- The Campus Freedom Index, run by the Justice Centre for Constitutional Freedom, ranks universities' and student unions' free speech practices. It gave the UVSS F's in "student union policies" and D's in "student union practices" in 2017, 2018, 2019, and 2020.
- In March 2017 Third Space (the advocacy group for women and transgender students) spent thousands of its student-funded budget to erect a white wall with "How do you challenge white supremacy?" written on it in front of the Student Union Building. There were black markers left for students to write their responses. Overnight the wall was vandalized with white supremacist messages. The wall was removed.

== See also ==
- List of British Columbia students' associations
