= Alberta Students' Executive Council =

- Location: Edmonton, Alberta
- Established: 1982
- Members: 16 member organizations representing 130,000 students.
- Website: albertastudents.ca

The Alberta Students' Executive Council (ASEC) is a provincial student advocacy organization based in Edmonton, Alberta. Membership is open to student associations from any post-secondary institution in Alberta, and ASEC currently includes members from 14 universities, colleges, and polytechnic institutions across the province. The ASEC membership represents 110,000 students, or approximately 1/3 of all post-secondary students in Alberta, Canada.

ASEC is a member-driven organization that is governed by its board of directors and Delegate Committee, both selected from its membership.

Each member association is represented at the Delegate Committee by a student leader as a voting delegate, or is assigned a proxy representative. ASEC is governed by the "one-school one-vote" principle to ensure that all member organizations are treated equally, regardless of student body size. The Delegate Committee is responsible for the approval of advocacy priorities, the annual selection of the auditor, and the selection of the Board of Directors.

The ASEC Board of Directors is composed of six student leaders, two staff members from member organizations (non-voting), and the executive director (non-voting). The Board is responsible for the strategic and financial direction of the organization, as well as oversight of the executive director.

The executive director is responsible for the daily operations of ASEC, as well as tasks relating to member relations, staff oversight, and financial management. Other staff members include the director of government relations and advocacy.

== History ==
ASEC begun as ACTISEC (Alberta College and Technical Institute Students' Executive Council), and was created after the disbanding of the Federation of Alberta Students (FAS) (a provincial organization that represented all of the public post-secondary institutions in Alberta) in 1981, when a number of colleges and technical institutes withdrew their membership citing domination of FAS by the universities. In 1982 a group of student delegates from colleges and technical institutes (Grant MacEwan College, Lakeland College, Lethbridge College, The Northern Alberta Institute of Technology, Medicine Hat College, Mount Royal College and The Southern Alberta Institute of Technology) met to form ACTISEC, an organization that would recognize the differences of all non-university post-secondary students.

The inaugural meeting of ACTISEC was held at the Northern Alberta Institute of Technology on March 11, 1982. David Whalen from NAITSA was appointed as the initiating Chairperson of the council, and sent a letter to James Horseman, the Minister of Advanced Education at the time, advising him of the formation of the new organization.

In the onset, the group focused mainly on sharing information and resources between its member institutions, as well as professional development of student leaders. Over time, however, it became apparent that there was also a need for a strong lobby organization that would concentrate mainly on external issues affecting post-secondary education, and on maintaining constant communication with government and other post-secondary institutions and organizations.

In May 2009, after it was made clear by the Government of Alberta that Grant MacEwan College and Mount Royal College would become known as Universities, ACTISEC initiated a name change to reflect its changing membership. The name Alberta Students' Executive Council was selected; ASEC's first Leadership Conference was held in May 2009 in Edmonton, Alberta.

In 2014 the students' associations of Mount Royal University, MacEwan University, and Athabasca University announced they were leaving ASEC and would be completing that process by March 2015.

== See also ==
- List of Alberta students' associations
