= Canadian International Development Agency =

Former Canadian government agency

The Canadian International Development Agency (CIDA; in French: Agence canadienne de développement international; ACDI) was a federal Canadian organization that administered foreign aid programs in developing countries. The agency was merged into the Department of Foreign Affairs in 2013 by the federal government under Prime Minister Stephen Harper.

== History ==
CIDA was formed in 1968 by the Canadian government under Lester B. Pearson. CIDA reported to the Parliament of Canada through the Minister for International Cooperation. Its mandate was to "support sustainable development in developing countries in order to reduce poverty and contribute to a more secure, equitable, and prosperous world." CIDA had its headquarters at 200 Promenade du Portage in Gatineau, Quebec.

CIDA funding was the subject of intense debate, and the Conservative government made major revisions to the funding process, including reductions to NGOs described as supporting "left-leaning causes", such as Montreal-based Alternatives.

=== Demise ===
In March 2013, the Conservative government announced that CIDA would be folded into the Department of Foreign Affairs, and the organizations renamed as the Department of Foreign Affairs, Trade and Development, later renamed as Global Affairs Canada. Critics said the merger would give insufficient attention to fighting poverty, but the Conservative government, and later the Liberal government that also kept CIDA programs under the same department, said the merger would lead to a more coherent international agenda. An internal report by the agency said that it would take up to 10 years for ex-CIDA employees to get used to the merger.

== Mandate ==
1. Social development
  CIDA has supported programs relating directly to the treatment of STDs in developing countries. It also cites basic education and child protection as priorities in the social development of countries that it aids.
2. Economic well-being
  Promoted and funded Microfinance and Education for sustainable development programs.
3. Environmental sustainability
  With a focus upon issues such as climate change, land degradation, and water supply, CIDA sought to help developing nations maintain healthy ecosystems. CIDA was a partner in the Canada Iraq Marshlands Initiative. For example, CIDA was a major donor to the International LUBILOSA Programme: which developed a biological pesticide for locust control, in support of small-holder farmers in the Sahel.
4. Governance
  CIDA strove for human rights, democracy, and good governance. The agency also supported gender equality.

== See also ==
- Canada Corps
- Global Alliance for Improved Nutrition
- Millennium Development Goals
- Robert Greenhill
- Local Enterprise Investment Centre a centre funded by Canadian Government through Canadian International Development Agency (CIDA) and managed by IDLC of Bangladesh Ltd. (IDLC) to develop Bangladeshi SMEs
- United States foreign aid
