= Canadian Alliance of Student Associations =

Student advocacy organization

- Abbreviation: CASA
- Formation: 1995
- Headquarters: Ottawa, Ontario, Canada
- Location: Canada
- Members: 29 (410,000 students)
- Executive director: Adam Asmar
- Chair: Sabina Kapoor
- Website: casa-acae.com

The Canadian Alliance of Student Associations (CASA) is a federally focused student advocacy organization. CASA currently has 29 members, who represent over 410,000 students from across Canada. With a formal partnership with the Quebec Student Union, CASA represents 410,000 students. CASA works towards an accessible, affordable, innovative and high-quality post-secondary education system.

== History, the early years ==
According to Nigel Roy Moses, CASA's origins can be traced to several national student organizing initiatives of the University of Alberta Students’ Union (UASU) from the mid-1980s to mid-1990s.

Starting in 1985, under the leadership of UASU president, Mike Nickel, the UASU led and organized a series of small conferences that eventually went under the name of the Canadian University Students’ Executive Council (CUSEC). The CUSEC lasted until 1988. The University of Alberta, University of British Columbia, University of Manitoba and later McGill University were the key participants in CUSEC—a decade later, these four large schools were among the 12 founding members of CASA.

Undeterred by their unsuccessful attempt to create an alternative to the Canadian Federation of Students, three years later, the UASU, in 1991, once again, initiated an anti-CFS conference, this time called Directing the Winds of Change. This conference, organized by the UASU vice-president Randy Boissonnault, a member of the Liberal Youth, would become the first of four "Winds" conferences held annually late in the Fall academic term. The last Winds conference in 1994 in Edmonton was a "major preparatory meeting" for CASA.

CUSEC and Winds of Change organizers at the University of Alberta and eventually the early participants in CASA often criticized the CFS because it allegedly wasted too much time debating and creating policies on social justice issues like abortion and gay rights, Palestinian solidarity, and potential nuclear war. Early CASA delegates deemed these concerns as "non-education issues" or "non-student issues" and were, therefore, outside the purview a national student organization, i.e. the one that they wanted to create. The large majority of CFS members rejected such a conservative vision and believed that they had the right and civic responsibility to enact policies on whatever concern they believed was important to the student interest.

Moses believes that early CASA proponents framed CFS incorrectly as merely a militant protest organization uninterested in reasoned discussion with politicians. They seemed to ignore how CFS was basically a highly organized lobby organization and exaggerated its so-called "militancy" to discredit CFS. Through peaceful campus and street protests, culminating in the National Day of Strike and Action on January 25, 1995, CFS members embarrassed the federal Liberals and brought public attention to the Liberal’s regressive social policy proposals and plans to cut postsecondary education. According to Moses, Winds organizers in 1994 and early CASA proponents at the CASA-planning meeting in January 1995 in Fredericton, made every effort to rein in CFS's protest and tried to sell their non-confrontational, lobby-only approach as the more responsible and effective method of influencing politicians. Following one of the largest CFS-led national student protests in Canadian history, Winds/CASA supporters got together in Fredericton, New Brunswick to figure out how they could create a counter-CFS national student organization in the expectation that this would undermine CFS that had just organized a protest of 80,000 students and supporters in “44 cities”.

Sandy Ryan of the University of Dalhousie University saw CASA in labour movement terms as a "company union" that was "initiated by members of the youth wing of the governing federal Liberal party."

As Moses suggests, early CASA supporters, even if they weren’t card carrying members of the Liberal Party, wittingly or not, undoubtedly played into the hands of the Liberal federal government. This was evident in their narrow, conservative political conception of how a student movement should behave and the CASA’s main objective of crushing CFS, one of the Liberal government's primary critics on education policy.

Moses describes another peculiarity about UASU’s history of antagonism to the national student organization: how, in the 1966/67 academic term, UASU president Branny Schepanovich, a long-time member of the University of Alberta’s students' Liberal Club, tried to "launch a conservative national student organization against the Canadian Union of Students." The UASU's organizers withdrew from CUS and urged other members to do the same. One of the reasons stated by Schepanovich for withdrawing was over CUS's policy against the American war in Vietnam. Like CUSEC and Winds/CASA leaders decades later, Schepanovich used the national student movements' policies on the pressing issues of the day, so-called "non-student issues", to drive a wedge in CUS.

In 1993, the federal government announced that all of Canada's social programs would be reviewed. Sweeping and significant changes were likely to come,

In 1998, Patrick Fitzpatrick, then acting Director of CASA, pled guilty to fraud charges after it was discovered that he embezzled money from the organization.

In 2003, Liam Arbuckle, then National Director, resigned after it was alleged that he provided confidential information to a candidate hoping to succeed him.

CASA was incorporated June 27, 1995. CASA currently has members in seven provinces and represents undergraduate, graduate, college and polytechnic students.

== Board of directors ==
CASA has a board of directors that helps guide the home office staff.

This board is made up of a chair, secretary, treasurer, and four directors-at-large. The director-at-large positions include a Director of Policy, Director of Advocacy, Director of Membership, and Director of Equity, Diversity, and Inclusion.

== See also ==
- Alberta Students' Executive Council
- College Student Alliance
- Council of Alberta University Students
- New Brunswick Student Alliance
- Ontario Undergraduate Student Alliance
- Students Nova Scotia
- Undergraduates of Canadian Research Intensive Universities
