= Travel Service =

Travel Service may refer to a travel agency or:

== Governmental Agencies ==
- United States Travel Service, a defunct part of the United States Department of Commerce

== Specific travel agencies ==
- Canadian Universities Travel Service, a travel agency in Canada
- China Travel Service, the tourism and travel agency of the government of the People's Republic of China
- Cuba Travel Services, a tour and charter operator serving Cuba from the United States
- Dnata Travel Services, a travel agency in Dubai, United Arab Emirates
- Hong Thai Travel Services, a travel agency in Hong Kong, China

== Airlines ==
- Travel Service (airline), an airline headquartered in the Czech Republic
  - Travel Service (Hungary)
  - Travel Service (Slovakia)
  - Travel Service Polska

== Bus operators ==
- Borehamwood Travel Services now London Sovereign, a bus operator in London, England
- Busways Travel Services, a former bus operator in the north east of England
- Durham Travel Services, a former bus operator in London, England
- Trathens Travel Services now Park's Motor Group, a bus operator in central Scotland
