= Atlantic Federation of Students =

Canadian student union

Atlantic Federation of Students (AFS) was an Atlantic Canadian student organization existing from January 1975 to November 1978.

== History ==
The AFS was created in the 1970s, after the Canadian Union of Students, formerly National Federation of Canadian University Students (created in 1926) ceased existence in 1969. The AFS had links to the National Union of Students (which was created in 1972, several years after CUS was disbanded). It also held ties to the Ontario Federation of Students (OFS), and l'Association nationale des etudiants du Québec. The AFS had 12 university and college member locals from Newfoundland and Labrador, New Brunswick, and Nova Scotia. Through its activity, the Atlantic Federation also came under surveillance by the Royal Canadian Mounted Police Security Service and the Canadian Security Intelligence Service.

== Organizing ==
In 1976 the Federation received a considerable set-back from one of its largest members, Dalhousie Student Council (DSC). $2,000 in emergency funds for the fledgling Federation was denied by DSC. It was voted down on the grounds that a detailed budget was not produced by AFS. The funds were to ensure full operation of the AFS during spring 1976 referendums in the Atlantic provinces. AFS secretary Don Soucy challenged the DSC motion stating that the DSC had committed to produce a budget for the AFS. Soucy stated "The main problem is the constant referral to AFS as 'they'… the failure to realize that it is not 'they' but an organization of the post-secondary students in the Atlantic provinces."

In late February, 1977, students from St. Frances Xavier University in Antigonish, Nova Scotia, voted in favour of joining the AFS but did not reach quorum. By-laws of the Federation stipulated that at least 40% of students had to vote to legally join the Federation. The vote came short of quorum by 1.5%.

== Campaigns ==
In 1977-78, students in the Atlantic provinces were battling their respective provincial governments over shortfalls in funding and the prospect of increased tuition. The Council of Maritime Premiers fell short of the 11.5% funding increase recommended by the Maritime Provinces Higher Education Commission. This meant tuition fee increases for students. As a result, students from all over Nova Scotia marched on provincial legislature.
