= Canadian Federation of Students =

Student organization

- Fédération canadienne des étudiantes et étudiants (French)
- Abbreviation: CFS
- Predecessor: National Union of Students; Association of Student Councils
- Formation: 1981
- Headquarters: Ottawa, Ontario
- Location: Canada
- Members: 530,000
- Chairperson: Mary Feltham
- Deputy chairperson: David Ohene-Amoako
- Treasurer: Owen Skeen
- Website: cfs-fcee.ca

The Canadian Federation of Students (CFS; French: Fédération canadienne des étudiantes et étudiants, FCÉÉ) is a student organization in Canada, representing over 530,000 students from across Canada.

Formed in 1981, the stated goal of the federation is to represent the collective voice of Canadian students and work at the federal level for high quality, accessible post-secondary education. The CFS has its roots in Canada's long tradition of having national student organizations, such as formerly the National Union of Students, the Canadian Union of Students, the National Federation of Canadian University Students, the Canadian Student Assembly, and the Student Christian Movement of Canada (SCM).

CFS is composed of member local student unions. All members of the Canadian Federation of Students pay membership dues as a part of their membership.

In Canadian student politics, the decision of whether a student union should be a member of the federation is a contentious issue, and the organization's processes for joining or leaving its membership has been the subject of much debate.

== Structure ==
The name "Canadian Federation of Students" is generally used to designate three legally distinct organizations: the national CFS, one of the provincial components of the federation, and/or CFS-Services.

CFS and CFS-Services share the same bylaws and decision-making structures. These structures include biannual general meetings, where every member students' union receives one vote regardless of the size of their local membership, and an executive, which includes representatives of each provincial affiliate. In provinces where a significant number of students' unions are members of the CFS, the affiliated component (e.g. CFS-Ontario, CFS-NS) has its own general meetings and executive, the latter being formed by representatives of the local students' unions. In October 2009 CFS-Quebec ceased to operate as a recognized provincial affiliate of the CFS.

== History ==
The CFS was officially formed on October 18, 1981, from the merger of two national organizations - the National Union of Students in Canada and the Association of Student Councils - and student federations from five Canadian provinces (Alberta, British Columbia, Nova Scotia, Ontario and Saskatchewan). The goal of the merger was to create a united student movement in Canada that could provide student-oriented services and political representation at the federal and provincial levels of government. Part of the impetus to organize came from the federal government's announcement of $2 billion of cuts from Established Program Financing (including cuts to federal transfer payments for health and education). Another impetus was raising tuition fees, which had been a major issue for CFS' precursor organization. the NUS, starting in the late 1970s.

=== Founding conference ===
The founding conference was held at Carleton University between October 14–19, 1981. Mike McNeil was elected as the organization's first Chairperson, along with Mike Walker (Treasurer), former NUS treasurer Kirk Falconer (International Affairs Commissioner), Kathie Cram (Women's Commissioner), Brian Robinson (Graduate Student Representative), Ben Freedman (Member at Large), and Leslie Neilson (Member at Large). The federation's bylaws and constitution were finalized and over 50 motions were passed during the plenary. After hearing speeches by Salvadoran and Chilean students, delegates passed motions condemning human rights violations and anti-student policies in those countries.

A campaign strategy was also launched to oppose the federal government's planned cut to Established Program Financing (EPF). The slogan for the campaign was "Access not axe us" and it called for an establishment of an all-grant system and a public inquiry into the future of post-secondary education. The campaign also called for alliance building with community groups and public sector workers to gain support and fight against cutbacks to social programs. The campaign was named after a research report of the same name, by Bruce Tate. The report focused on effects of the Government of Canada's cutback to education and highlighted issues such as access and tuition fee levels.

The conference ended with a student presence in Question Period in the House of Commons of Canada, a meeting with Secretary of State Gerald Regan, and a one-on-one debate between Chairperson Mike McNeil and Member of Parliament John Evans (parliamentary secretary to Finance Minister Allan MacEachen) in the Snake Lounge at Carleton University. Delegates attending Question Period were denied entry by security guards. Mike McNeil and delegates were not satisfied with the outcome of the meeting with Gerald Regan.

=== Evolution of membership ===
==== 1992-1995 ====
In 1992, the CFS resolved that it would be a "partner in the International Student Trade, Environment and Development Program." Member locals were urged "to consider hosting international guests from the US.A and Mexico during the fall of 1992 to contribute to the national dialogue of the effects on the education system of the North American Free Trade Agreement." (CFS Minutes, May 24-30th, Centre Universitaire Saint-Louis Maillet, Edmundston, New Brunswick).

The CFS reached a membership of 440,000 students from 65 member students' unions in 1993–1994.

Overall, 20 membership votes were held in 1994–1995, with the net result that 59 member students' unions formed the CFS in September 1996.

==== 1995-2007 ====
Between 1995 and 2007, over twenty students' unions joined the CFS, including many graduate students' associations and part-time students' associations.

Several large undergraduate students' associations voted to join CFS during the same period. In 2002, the University of Toronto Students' Administrative Council, which had never been part of a national students' union before, voted to join the CFS. At the November 2005 annual general meeting of the federation, the positive result of the votes at both University of Manitoba Students' Union and the University of Saskatchewan Students' Union were ratified. The latter vote result was challenged by former USSU director, and in 2007, the courts ruled the vote to be of no force or effect. The CFS website continues to list the USSU as Local 17. In October 2007, USSU voted to keep prospective membership in the CFS and hold a referendum in the next two years; however, in September 2009 the USSU voted to rescind that motion and claims that its affiliation with CFS is void.

==== 2008 ====
In March 2008, students at four campuses (Cape Breton University, Simon Fraser University, Kwantlen University-College, and Graduate students at University of Victoria) held votes to leave the CFS. The negative media coverage of the CFS was one of the reasons listed by the Kwantlen Student Association representatives for calling the votes. Members at CBU, the SFU and the UVic (graduate students) voted to leave. CFS representatives did not participate in the Cape Breton referendum, noting that the CBUSU failed to give proper notice. Fellow CFS members from other campuses participated in the Simon Fraser vote to leave CFS, but then national chairperson Amanda Aziz stated that problems with the voting process could result in the outcome not being recognized by the CFS. The SFU referendum, overseen by J. J. McCullough, saw a successful turnout with 67 per cent of students voting to leave the CFS; though contested, it was finalized in 2012. The UVGSS result was not contested by the CFS. The Canadian Federation of Students petitioned the BC Supreme Court to postpone the Kwantlen referendum after Kwantlen Students Association representatives hired Schiffner Consultants to run the vote (contrary to CFS bylaws but in accordance with KSA standard operating procedures). Then-KSA chairperson Laura Anderson claimed that the federation was attempting to stall the vote, but the court granted the CFS the injunction and the vote to leave CFS was rescheduled for April 2008. Three weeks after the referendums at SFU and UVic (graduate students), Kwantlen students voted to remain members of the CFS.

In the fall of 2008, the largest bilingual student association in Canada, the Student Federation of the University of Ottawa, re-joined the CFS. However, in December 2018 the SFUO will no longer be recognized as a student union by the Universities governing bodies, following a termination of their agreement.

==== 2009 ====
In October 2009, students at Carleton, Guelph, and Concordia organized a drive to leave CFS, resulting in petitions meeting the threshold necessary to initiate decertification votes. Students at the University of Victoria Students' Society, and the Graduate Student Association at the University of Calgary collected enough signatures to initiate a decertification vote.

==== 2010 ====
In the spring of 2010, undergraduate students at the University of Guelph and the Alberta College of Art and Design and graduate students at the University of Calgary and McGill University attempted to hold decertification votes. Only the Alberta College of Art and Design vote followed the applicable CFS bylaws. Several irregularities in the conduct of the students' unions at McGill and Calgary were cited by the CFS as reasons for invalidating the decertification votes.

==== 2011 ====
In March 2011, undergraduate students at the University of Victoria voted to leave the CFS.

==== 2012 ====
Former CFS logo

In January 2012, students of Laurentian University at Georgian College in Barrie joined the CFS as the Laurentian Students' Union (Local 111). In a February 7, 2012 article that appeared in The Concordian, it was reported that the CFS was alleging that the Concordia Students' Union owed $1.8 million in unpaid membership dues going back as far as the 1990s. Lex Gill, then-president of the CSU firmly denied the CFS' claim, while congratulating the SFSS for "setting the tone" with regards to legal proceedings. After challenging the legitimacy of SFU's 2008 referendum, the CFS ultimately settled out of court, leading Simon Fraser University's student union to officially leave in 2012.

==== 2018 ====
In June 2018, after a lengthy conflict between the CFS and the British Columbia Federation of Students (BCFS) over unpaid membership dues, the CFS voted to expel all member unions belonging to the CFS and the BCFS.

== Current campaigns ==
=== Fight the Fees ===
The CFS actively lobbies on tuition-related issues, including meeting with MPs and organizing "days of action" to address such issues as eliminating tuition fees and reductions in interest rates on student loans. In Newfoundland and Labrador, the only province where all public college and university students' are members of the CFS, students pay the lowest average undergraduate tuition fees in Canada. There, tuition fees were reduced by 25 per cent in the 1990s and have remained frozen. The current Progressive Conservative government has pledged to keep the freeze in place until the end of their mandate, and recently eliminated the interest on the provincial portion of student loans. In 2015, the provincial government in Alberta froze tuition fees.

In British Columbia, the CFS successfully lobbied the former New Democratic Party (NDP) government to introduce tuition fee freezes and reductions.

=== Fairness for International Students ===
In 2017, the CFS launched a campaign in support of international students. On average, international students pay $25,589.00 per year for a general arts degree in Canada; an amount close to four times more than domestic students. In March 2018, the CFS held a lobby week for international students, where students met with MPs and senators to lobby on the three pillars of the campaign: eliminating all differential tuition fees, providing universal public healthcare, and ensuring clear pathways to permanent residency.

=== Indigenous student issues ===
The Circle of First Nations, Metis and Inuit Students "Circle" is the mechanism with the CFS by which Indigenous students can organize campaigns. The Caucus has its own budget and runs campaigns such as Where's the Justice, Not Your Stereotype, No More Stolen Sisters, and ReconciliAction. One of ReconciliAction's, the Circle's most recent campaign, main goal's is to fulfill the Truth and Reconciliation Commission's 16th recommendation by increasing support for indigenous language education at post-secondary institutions.

After extensive lobby by CFS members on increased funding for the Post-Secondary Student Support Program, the federal government announced in 2017 an increase of $90 million to the program for indigenous learners.

After serving as the chair of circle for two years, Coty Downey Zacheriah became the first Indigenous National Chairperson of the Canadian Federation of students, and is currently serving his second term.

Prior to 2017, the caucus was named National Aboriginal Caucus, abbreviated as NAC.

=== Sexualized and Gender Based Violence ===
One of the CFS's longest-standing campaigns is the 'No Means No' campaign, now called 'Consent is Mandatory.' The CFS works closely with on-campus sexual assault centres to challenge rape culture, educate students about sexual consent and combat gender-based violence. In 2018 the federal government announced a National framework to address gender based violence in post-secondary education sector. In 2016, governments in Ontario, Manitoba and British Columbia passed legislation requiring post-secondary institutions to have stand-alone sexual assault and harassment policies.

=== Mental Health ===
The CFS campaigns for increased support for on-campus mental health services and overall access to medication and counselling. The campaign saw early success. In 2017 colleges and universities received an additional $6 million of federal funding annually (promised for three years) to provide mental health services and supports for students, bringing the total amount of mental health funding to $15 million a year. In 2018, the Ontario government announced a $2.1 billion investment in mental health services.

=== End the Ban ===
In 1998, the CFS launched a campaign to change Canadian Blood Services' policy of prohibiting any man who has had sex with a man from donating blood. The campaign garnered significant media attention. In May 2013, Canadian Blood Services changed their lifetime ban to a five-year deferral if, during those five years, men do not have sex with men. In the spring of 2016, Canadian Blood Services changed the deferral to one year.

=== United for Equity ===
The United for Equity campaign "aims to challenge all forms of discrimination and oppression on our campuses, in our communities, and in our student organizing spaces." The CFS produces a number of materials on challenging racism, sexism, ableism, homophobia, transphobia, islamaphobia and anti-semitism. The organization also helps student unions educate their members about these issues through workshops and awareness-raising. In 2006, the CFS completed a Taskforce on the Needs of Muslim Students.

=== Graduate student issues ===
The Canadian Federation of Students is the only student organization in Canada with a distinct graduate caucus that elects its own executive and operates with its own budget. Known as the National Graduate Caucus (NGC), it consists of 90,000 graduate students at 29 campuses across Canada.

==== Commercialization of research ====
The NGC campaigns to oppose commercialization of university research because its research shows that pressures from industry partners can threaten academic freedom and the public interest. It points to cases such as those of Nancy Olivieri and David Healy as examples of commercialization run amok.

==== Whistleblowers campaign ====
In 2006, the NGC began working with Christopher Radziminski, alumnus from the University of Toronto, to support his battle with the University of Toronto and the Natural Sciences and Engineering Research Council (NSERC) over research conducted with ERCO Worldwide. The former student alleges that a drinking water experiment in Wiarton, Ontario was not accurately reported in scholarly journals, posing a serious health risk to Canadians. The NGC is supporting a judicial review of NSERC's decision not to press for an investigation at the University of Toronto.

==== Post-residency fees ====
The NGC has an active campaign to reduce fees charged to graduate students after their residency period. Graduate student unions affiliated to the NGC urge graduate students to sign pledges that they will not make alumni donations until their university reduces post-residency fees.

==== Copyright renewal ====
The NGC has been lobbying the federal government in partnership with several organizations over current reform of the Canadian Copyright Act. This involves a letter writing campaign to MPs and participation in developing the Creative Commons project.

==== Research funding ====
The NGC advocates for increased graduate student funding in the form of scholarships and training programmes. In the 2016 federal budget, the Government of Canada allocated an additional $95 million towards public research through the Tri-Council granting agencies.

==== BDS ====
The union officially endorsed the campaign in November 2018.

== Services ==
The Canadian Federation of Students-Services (CFS-Services) is a legally separate branch of the federation, founded in the early 1980s as the successor organization to the Association of Students' Councils Canada (AOSC). Services made available to individual student members or member students' unions of the CFS include:

- the International Student Identity Card (see below);
- the StudentSaver Discount Card;
- the Student Work Abroad Program (SWAP);
- the National Student Health Network (NSHN), a non-profit health and dental benefits buying consortium;
- a handbook and day planner producing service, which aims to reduce the cost per handbook to the individual students' unions, through economies of scale;
- Digital services, including web services, a comprehensive web authoring solution for students' unions that allows them to easily publish and maintain database driven websites;
- Sexual health products, where members can purchase products for their membership at reduced cost;
- UFile, a partnership that allows students to file their taxes for free;
- Ethical Purchasing Network (EPN), which uses members' collective purchasing power to buy goods that are ethically sourced. Products are fair trade, union-made, or sweatshop-free.

=== Travel CUTS ===
Travel CUTS (Canadian Universities Travel Service) is a travel agency that was majority-owned and operated by CFS-Services (CFS-S), which operates in Canada and the United States. In 2009, Travel CUTS was sold to Merit Travel Group.

In 1996, the University Students' Council at the University of Western Ontario initiated a lawsuit against CFS-Services, to be later joined by three other student societies (Alma Mater Society of the University of British Columbia, Queen's Alma Mater Society and University of Alberta Students' Union). The plaintiffs "alleged the CFS-Services illegally transferred assets from the AOSC, including Travel CUTS, to itself at a 1987 meeting". A settlement was reached in 2006 through which the plaintiffs acquired 24 per cent of Travel CUTS and two seats on its board of directors.

=== International Student Identity Card ===
The CFS is the Canadian issuing agent for the International Student Identity Card (ISIC), an internationally recognized student identification that provides access to discounts on travel and other products. Only CFS members can obtain an ISIC at no charge. The ISIC sells for $20 to students who are not CFS members. The ISIC is considered to be the most direct financial benefit associated with CFS membership.

== Government relations ==
A large part of the CFS' mandate is to lobby the federal government from its national office in Ottawa. Over the years, CFS representatives have testified to dozens of House of Commons committees, including the Standing Committee on Finance and the Standing Committee on Humans Resources Development and Persons with Disabilities (student loans). In 2009, the CFS national chairperson was invited to deliver a workshop on lobbying policy-makers at a conference hosted by the Federated Press.

The 2016 federal budget included several of the CFS' lobbying recommendations, including a 50 per cent increase to the Canada Student Grants program, a $165 million investment in the Youth Employment Strategy, and additional public research funding.

In addition to the ongoing testimonies and meetings, the CFS holds an annual Lobby Week that brings together dozens of students from across Canada to meet with their local Members of Parliament and Senators. In 2017, over 150 meetings were held to lobby for eliminating domestic & international student tuition fees, student debt relief, investing in indigenous learners, and more graduate research funding.

== Legal cases (advocacy) ==
=== Student loan bankruptcy ===
In 1999, the CFS challenged the legality of the student loan bankruptcy prohibition.

=== Translink and free speech ===
The legally separate but closely related affiliate, the Canadian Federation of Students-British Columbia (CFS-BC), in participation with the British Columbia Civil Liberties Association and British Columbia Teachers' Federation, won a case against Translink for refusing to put CFS-BC Vote Education advertising on buses that Translink deemed to be partisan advertising during an election. The case was appealed all the way to the Supreme Court of Canada, where it ruled that Translink's actions violated the Canadian Charter of Rights and Freedoms, and in doing so, the Court set the precedent that "arms-length" government agencies such as Translink do come under Charter scrutiny.

=== Injunction against Fair Elections Act ===
In 2014, The Council of Canadians and the Canadian Federation of Students launched a challenge against the Fair Elections Act, which the organizations believed would disenfranchise Canadians and prevent the most marginalized people in our society from voting. While the matter is still before the courts, the Liberal government has promised to repeal the changes implemented by the Conservatives, which was the basis of the court challenge.

== Membership disputes ==
Historically, the federation has had numerous legal disputes with student unions over its membership rules. Under its rules, student unions are contractually required to pay membership fees to the CFS, even if the student union leadership does not want to remain members of the organization. This arrangement has led to numerous legal battles between the federation and student unions wanting to leave or enter the organization.

=== Cape Breton University ===
In March 2008, students at Cape Breton University held a vote to leave the CFS, with 92 per cent of voting students supporting exiting the organization. Arguing that the vote failed to follow the organization's bylaws regarding notification of referendums, the CFS declined to recognize the results of the vote. After the referendum, the Cape Breton University Students Union (CBUSU) ceased collecting membership fees on behalf of the CFS. In 2009, the CFS filed suit for dues owed; further, in 2015 the Ontario Superior Court ordered the CBUSU to pay $293,000 in unpaid membership fees, plus the CFS' legal expenses. In August 2015, the CBUSU announced its decision to appeal. In September, 2015, a fourth year CBU student delivered a petition to the CBUSU signed by approximately 30 per cent of the CBU student body seeking a new vote on exiting the CFS. However, the CFS' bylaws do not allow a member organization to hold an exit referendum while dues remain outstanding.

=== Capilano University ===
In March 2014, Capilano university students voted by referendum to terminate their membership.

=== Concordia University ===
The CFS is a defendant in a suit launched by the Concordia Students' Union seeking recognition of a vote to leave CFS in 2011. The National Executive refused to grant a disaffiliation vote before $1.8 million in alleged outstanding membership fees were remitted. The then-president of the Concordia Students' Union, Lex Gill, firmly denied this claim: "I am completely firm in my conviction that we do not owe the CFS $1.8 million and never have." In 2015, CFS Entities and CSU reached an agreement that the CSU "membership has been terminated." The Concordia Graduate Student Association (GSA) has also terminated its membership. The details of the agreement remain confidential.

=== Post-Graduate Students' Society of McGill University ===
In April 2010, members of the Post-Graduate Students' Society of McGill University (PGSS) voted 86 per cent in favour of ending association with the CFS. The CFS did not recognize the results of this vote, leading the PGSS to file suit. The PGSS' lawsuit is still in progress. In January 2015, a second referendum on membership was held, following a court order against the CFS in response to a separate lawsuit filed by McGill student Ge Sa seeking recognition of an exit petition forwarded by Sa in 2014. In the 2015 referendum, McGill graduate students voted 2014 to 56 in favour of leaving the CFS.

=== Simon Fraser University ===
The CFS was a defendant in a case brought by the Simon Fraser Student Society (SFSS) at Simon Fraser University over the validity of a vote to leave CFS in March 2008. After a summary trial was rejected, the judge ruled that the SFSS had the option of holding another vote or continuing to resolve the legality of the disputed referendum through a trial. The judge urged both parties to consider settling the matter out of court before spending large amounts of money on a full-length trial. In early January, 2012, the CFS/CFS-Services/CFS-British Columbia and the SFSS agreed to an undisclosed settlement and ceased all court action.

=== University of Guelph ===
The Central Student Association representing undergraduate University of Guelph students submitted an injunction on February 16, 2010, against the CFS and its affiliates for denying the student association a vote to leave CFS as a result of a dispute over the validity of a petition required to initiate the referendum.

Justice O'Connor of the Ontario Superior Court of Justice ordered that a vote be conducted and administered by a referendum oversight committee (ROC) based on CFS bylaws (consisting of two representatives selected by the CFS and two representatives selected by the student association). Justice O'Connor modified the committee by appointing former Ontario Superior Court Justice James Chadwick as a fifth member of the committee to act as an independent third party to break deadlocks should the two parties disagree on administration of the vote.

The court-ordered referendum was conducted online in early April 2010. Guelph students voted 73.5 per cent in favour of leaving CFS in an online poll conducted by the university administration. CFS and CFS-O appealed Justice O'Connor's decision and the matter was held on May 31, 2011 though the application Judge, Justice O'Connor, failed to provide any reasons for the decision, making it impossible to review the appeal. The Appeals Court Judges ordered the matter be heard by a different Judge.

=== University of Victoria ===
The University of Victoria Students' Society (UVSS) representing undergraduate University of Victoria students submitted legal action against the CFS in November 2010 to seek a vote to leave the federation. The dispute centred around a petition submitted by UVic student Jose Barrios in the Fall of 2009 that had the required 10 per cent of signatures needed to initiate a referendum. In Spring 2010, the CFS National Executive rejected this petition because hundreds of students signed a second petition calling for their names to be removed from Barrios' petition list. In November 2010, Barrios initiated legal action against the CFS.

Mr. Justice Malcolm D. Macaulay of the Supreme Court of British Columbia heard oral arguments from both sides on January 6 and 7, 2011. On February 1, 2011, Justice Macaulay ruled that the use of a 'counterpetition' to nullify the original petition 'must fail' and ordered that the process to hold a referendum on continued membership must move forward. On the applicability of the second 'counterpetition', Justice Macaulay wrote: "The national executive of the CFS invoked a process that was not contemplated by the bylaws in effect at the time and, as a result, applied an irrelevant consideration in determining that the petition was not in order. The adoption of a process outside the bylaws amounted to an excess of jurisdiction."

The CFS refused to grant a decertification vote until the UVSS paid $100,000+ in outstanding membership dues. The UVSS rejected the claim that it owed money and took the CFS to court on February 17. The UVSS argued that by bringing up this issue so late, the CFS was making an intentional move to delay a vote from occurring before the end of the 2010–2011 academic year. Justice Macaulay ruled for the vote to take place regardless of outstanding dues. In March 2011 UVic undergraduate students voted to leave the Canadian Federation of Students. The National Federation recognized the result, but the CFS-BC refused, claiming the vote did not apply to the provincial affiliate. A subsequent legal battle ensued, leading to a new successful UVSS petition effort to trigger a CFS-BC membership vote. In 2013, one month before the UVSS was scheduled to vote on its CFS-BC membership, the CFS-BC voted to terminate the UVSS's membership, marking the official end of all UVSS membership ties to the Canadian Federation of Students.

=== Selkirk College ===
The Selkirk College Students' Union representing all Selkirk College students submitted a petition for a vote on continued membership in the CFS in December 2016. The CFS verified that the petition was valid in early 2017. However, no referendum was scheduled by the Canadian Federation of Students at Selkirk College. The Students' Union asserts that its members followed the process, and that there is no reason not to move forward with a referendum. The CFS asserts that its ongoing dispute with the British Columbia Federation of Students means that students at Selkirk College cannot have a vote on continued membership.

=== BCFS Expelled ===
After years of dispute, a motion expelling all 12 members of the BCFS was unanimously passed, in the opening plenary of the 71 Semi-annual NGM. Resolving conflict.

== Criticism ==
The CFS has been criticized and remains a controversial topic in student politics.

The CFS has been labeled as anti-semitic by many Canadian Jewish organizations. During the 2019 CFS Referendum at Carleton University, B'nai Brith Canada, StandWithUs Canada, Hasbara Fellowships Canada, and Alpha Epsilon Pi fraternity released a letter calling on Ontario university students to opt-out of paying dues to CFS due to the organization's support for the Boycott, Divestment and Sanctioning of Israel.

The CFS has been criticized for its management of the mandatory student-paid fees that it collects. For instance, a forensic audit conducted by accounting firm Grant Thornton LLP uncovered a hidden bank account controlled by the CFS with over $260,000 inside. The CFS failed to release the full forensic review as to what these unauthorized funds were spent on between July 2010 and December 2014.

Another area of criticism has been the CFS's strict processes for decertification. The CFS is also criticised for being ineffective, with one student stating that "They don't put enough emphasis on focused lobbying of elected officials, and continue to prefer the protests and sit-ins." This criticism has been dismissed by many given the organization's annual Lobby Week where students from across the country meet with MPs and senators to push for affordable post-secondary education, and the CFS's presence on a variety of government committees. On the other hand, some Quebec student unions criticized the CFS for being too focused on government lobbying. The more radical protest focused culture of Quebec student politics was seen are incommensurate with the moderate CFS agenda.

When student unions hold referendums on joining the CFS, many CFS staff members campaign on campuses, despite not being students. In instances where students have voted to leave the CFS, the federation has opted to use student money to sue these schools for democratically choosing to leave the organization.
