= Hostel =

Cheap, sociable lodging

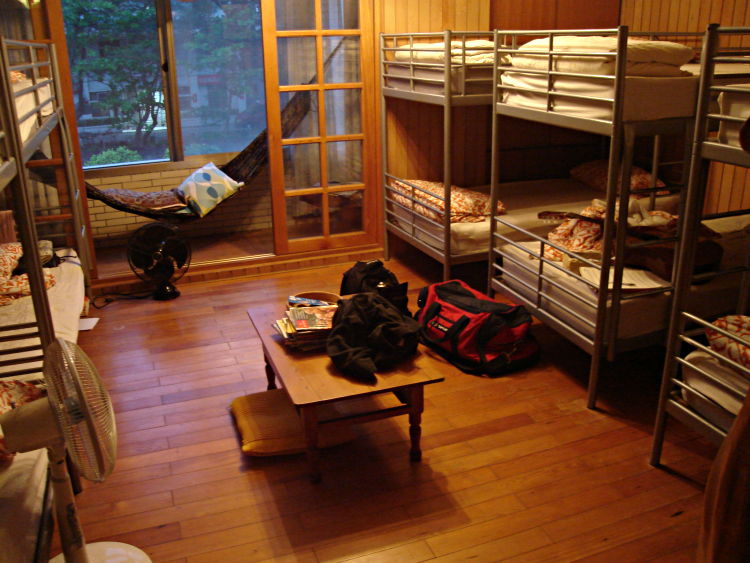
Hostel dormitory room in Taiwan

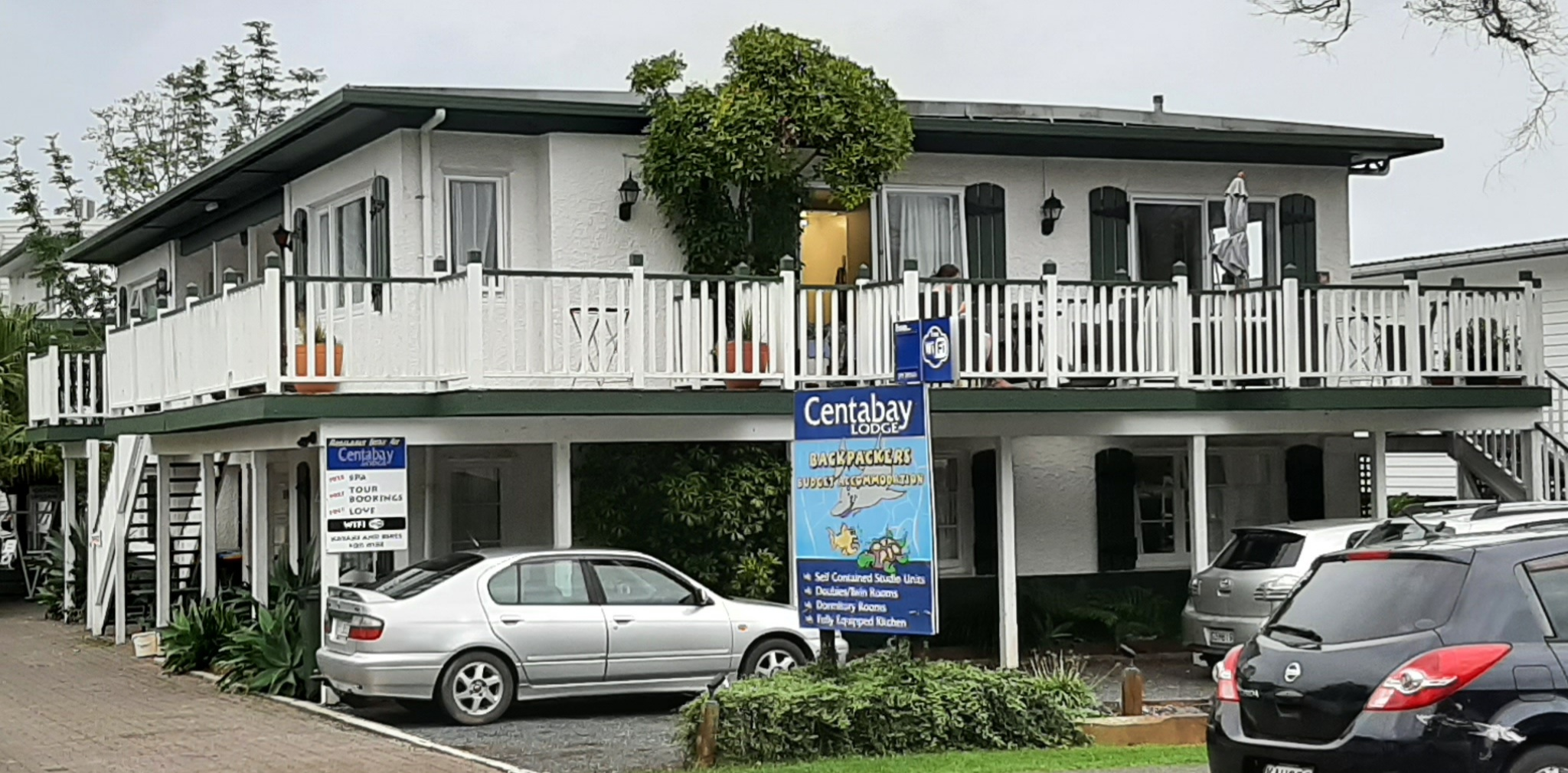
A house that has been converted into a hostel in Paihia, New Zealand

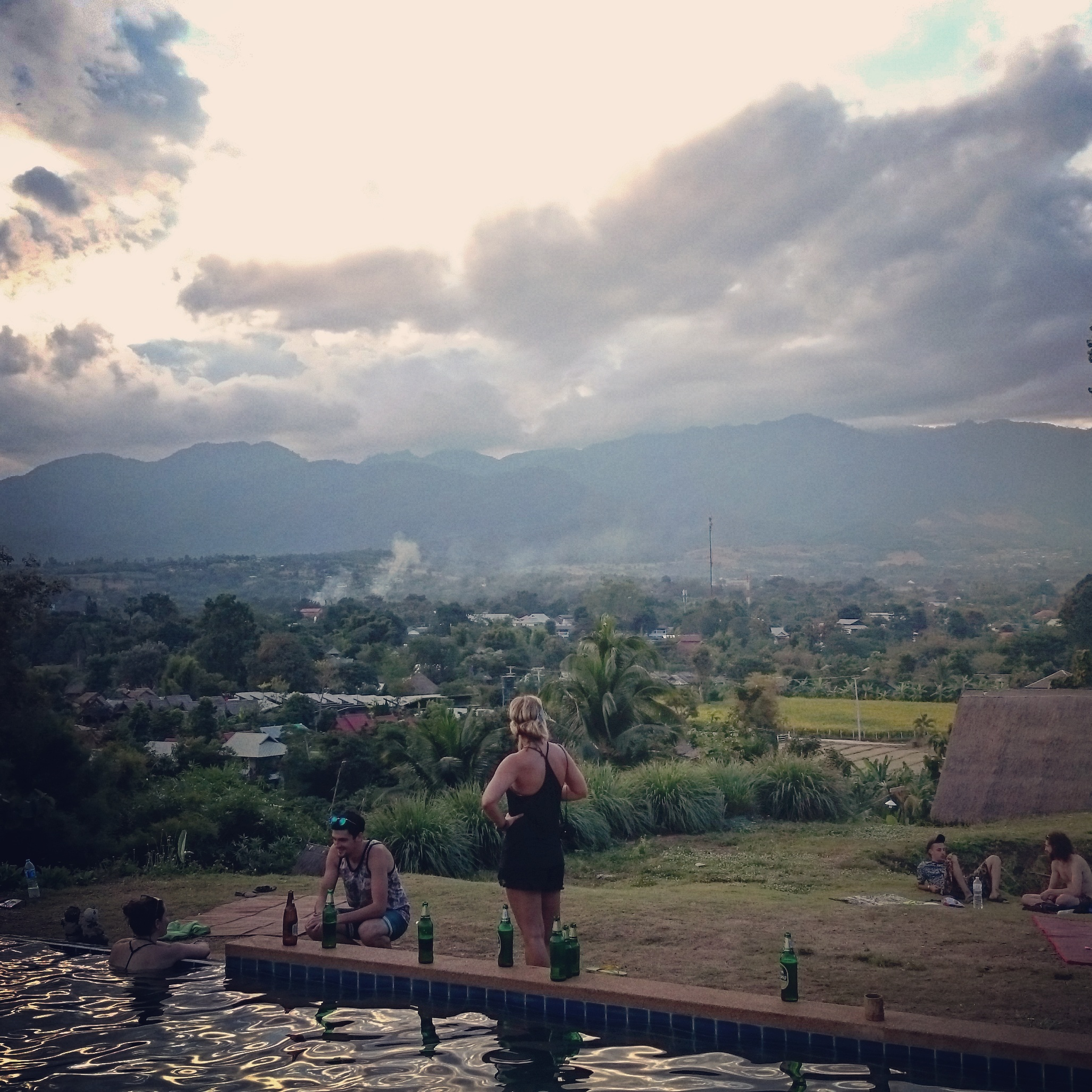
Outdoor pool and shared space at a hostel in Pai, Thailand

A hostel is a form of low-cost, short-term shared sociable lodging where guests can rent a bed, usually a bunk bed in a dormitory sleeping 4–20 people, with shared use of a lounge and usually a kitchen. Rooms can be private or shared - mixed or single-sex - and have private or shared bathrooms. Food and beverage, laundry services, luggage storage, and lockers may also be available.

Hostels are popular forms of lodging for backpackers and with youth travel; however, most do not impose age limits. The global size of the hostel market was estimated at US$7.21 billion in 2023 and was projected to grow at a 6.5% compound annual growth rate until 2030. In 2019, there were an estimated 5,829 hostels in Europe and 4,738 hostels in Asia. The typical guest is between 16 and 34 years old, although it can vary depending on the country. Many hostels are locally owned and operated.

== Advantages ==
The benefits to travelers of hostels include lower costs opportunities to meet people from different places, find travel partners and a sense of community, and share travel experiences. They are usually more centrally located than lodging found on Airbnb.

Some hostels, such as those in the Hostelling International network, cater to a niche market of travelers. For example, one hostel might feature in-house social gatherings such as movie nights or communal dinners, another might feature local tours, cooking classes, and pub crawls, one might be known for its parties, and another might have a quieter place to relax in serenity, or be located on the beach. Some may cater to older digital nomads, global nomads, and perpetual travelers who prefer slightly more upmarket private rooms or a quieter atmosphere. Hostels may also differentiate themselves by being environmentally friendly ecohostels.

Hostels may offer long-term lodging to guests for free or at a discount in exchange for work as a receptionist or in housekeeping.

== Issues to consider ==
- There is less privacy in a hostel than in a hotel. Sharing sleeping areas in a dormitory and bathrooms might not be comfortable for those requiring more privacy. However, the shared lodging makes it easier to meet new people. Some hostels encourage more social interaction between guests due to the shared sleeping areas and communal areas. Lounges typically have sofas and chairs, coffee tables, board games, books or book exchange, computers, and Internet access.
- Nearly all hostels have a shared communal kitchen area for the preparation of food and a storage area with refrigerators. Most hostels have a label system to identify the owner of the food. Some hostels will have a labeled "free shelf" where guests can leave unwanted food. Theft of food can happen.
- Noise can make sleeping difficult, whether from snoring, talking, and social activities in the lounge, guests staying up with the light on, or someone either returning late from bars or leaving early. To mitigate the effects, many guests use earplugs and eye masks.
- Some hostels do not provide linens.
- Some hostels may have a curfew and daytime lockouts.

== History ==
In August 1909, Richard Schirrmann, a teacher in Germany, first published his idea of inexpensive accommodation for youth travel after leading a school camping trip that was derailed by a thunderstorm. Schirrmann received considerable support and opened a makeshift hostel for hikers in the school in which he taught. On June 1, 1912, Schirrmann opened the first hostel in Altena Castle. The original hostel rooms are now a museum. Schirrmann served in World War I and after observing the Christmas truce on the Western Front in December 1915, he wondered whether "thoughtful young people of all countries could be provided with suitable meeting places where they could get to know each other". In 1919, he founded the German Youth Hostel Association.

By 1932, Germany had more than 2,000 hostels recording more than 4.5 million overnights annually. The International Youth Hostel Federation (now Hostelling International) was founded in October 1932. It is now an organization composed of more than 90 hostel associations representing over 4,500 hostels in over 80 countries. These hostels cater more to school-aged children, sometimes through school trips, and families with school-aged children.

In 1936, Franklin D. Roosevelt was the honorary president of AYH (now Hostelling International USA). John D. Rockefeller III was a proponent of hostels and was president for several years.

During World War II, many hostels in Europe were temporarily shut down or placed under the control of the Hitler Youth.

In the 1960s and 1970s, hostelling prospered. The industry declined during the 1970s energy crisis.

During the 2008 financial crisis and the Great Recession, the hostel market actually grew due to its cost appeal.

A law passed in New York State in 2010 banned hostels due to illegal hostels set up in residences, unless a hotel license was obtained.

== 10-euro commemorative coin ==
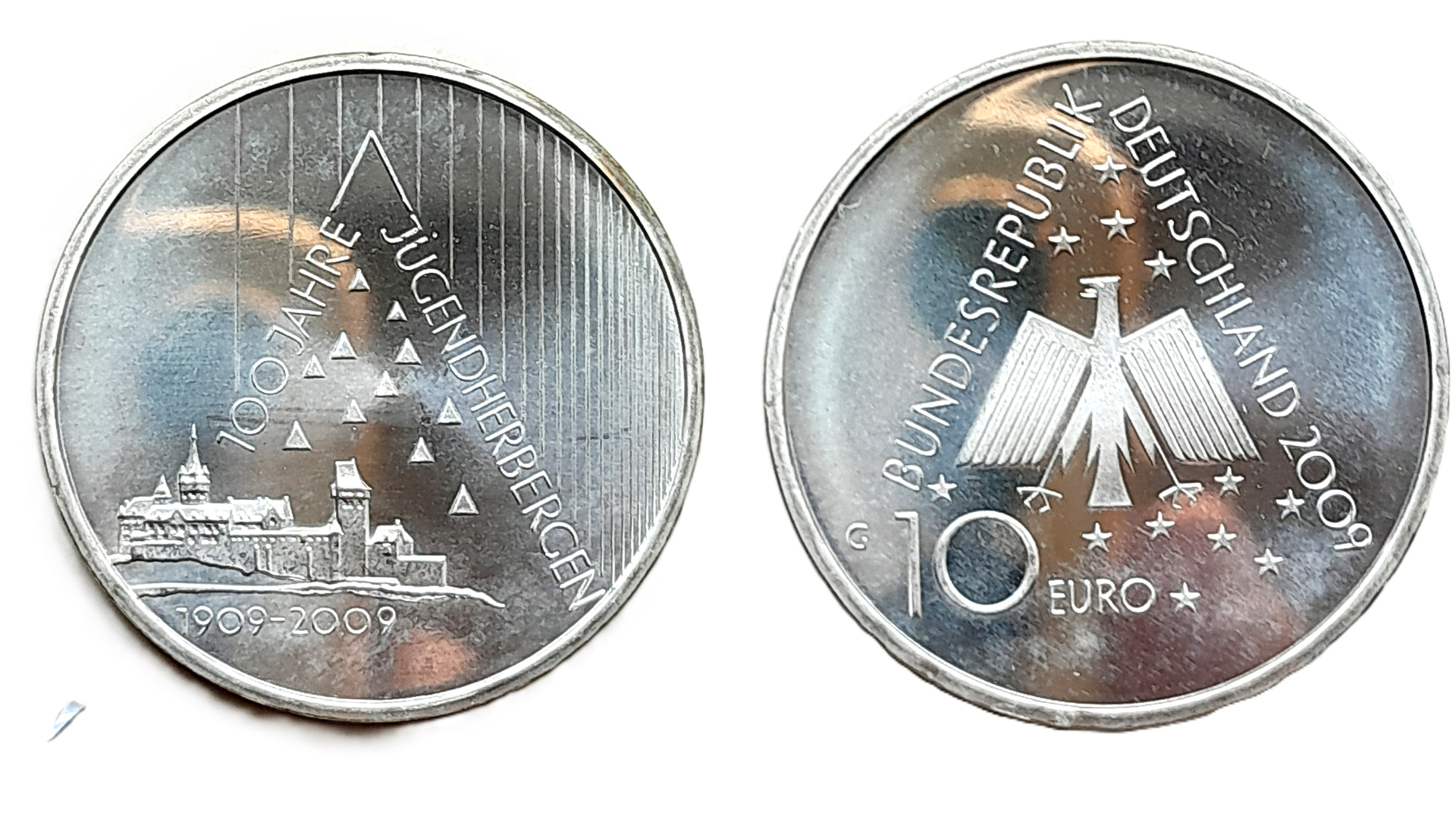
German 10‑euro

The German 10‑euro commemorative coin "100 Years of Youth Hostels" was issued in 2009 to mark the centenary of the founding of the first youth hostel in 1909. The obverse features a stylized architectural motif symbolizing the development of the youth hostel movement, while the reverse shows the federal eagle and the country's designation. As part of Germany's official series of euro commemorative coins, it highlights the cultural and educational significance of youth hostels in promoting community, travel, and social engagement.

== See also ==
- Bed and breakfast
- Inn
- Motel
