= Raglan Lodge =

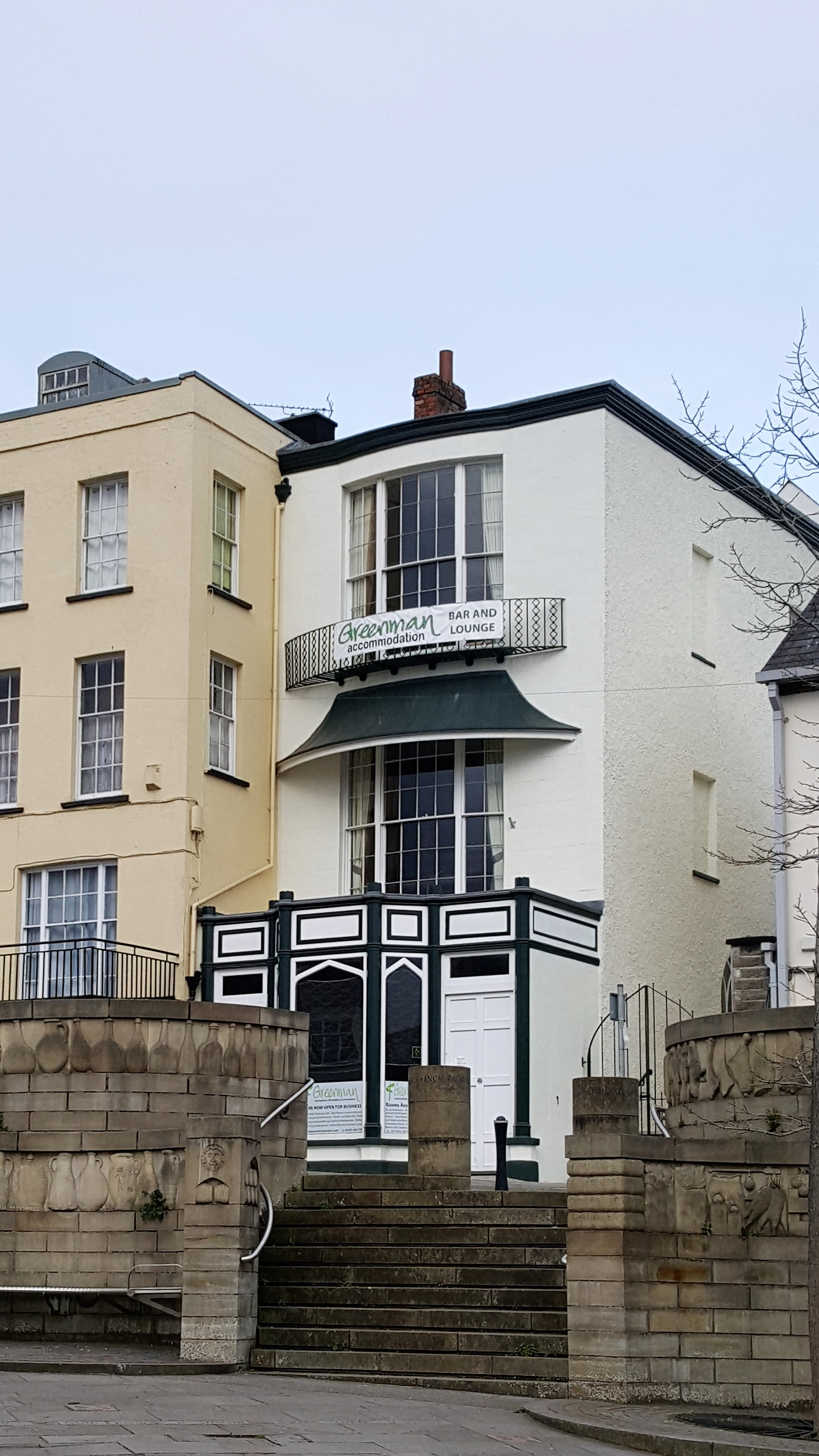

- Location within Monmouthshire
- 51.6423°N 2.6753°W
- Type: House
- Location: Chepstow, Monmouthshire, Wales

History
- Built: C14-19

Site notes
- Governing body: Privately owned

Listed Building – Grade II*
- Official name: Raglan Lodge
- Designated: 30 April 1956
- Reference no.: 2501

Raglan Lodge is a Grade II* listed building in Beaufort Square, Chepstow, Monmouthshire, Wales. Though the frontage dates from the early 19th century, parts of the building date from the medieval period and the ground floor vaulted hall was probably the town's 14th century moot hall. The building has been refurbished and was until recently used as a backpackers' hostel.

== Vaulted room or crypt ==
The building is located on Chepstow's medieval market square, later reduced in size by infill development and named Beaufort Square around 1850, after the landowners, the Dukes of Beaufort. The large ground floor room has a vaulted stone ceiling with carved bosses of floral decorations and of heads, one wearing a Monmouth cap. The room was probably the moot hall, or Booth Hall, recorded as existing in the town in the 14th and 15th centuries. It may be the building referred to in 1674 as an "old chapel". It was later referred to as the Crypt Room, and in the 18th and 19th centuries was variously used as a wine store, a coach house, an armoury, and a milliners' shop. Between 1880 and 1923, it was the site of the town's post office, and in 1915 held one of the first automated telephone exchanges in the country. Restoration work has revealed a previously-hidden stone cellar.

== 19th century rebuilding ==
In the 18th century, the site was the home of the Fydell family. Thomas Fydell (or Fydale) was sheriff of Monmouthshire in 1772, and, on occasion, assizes were held in the building. By around 1800 it came into the ownership of John Bowsher, the head of the locally important firm of shipping and timber merchants, Bowsher, Hodges and Watkins.

The frontage of the building was rebuilt in Regency style in the early 19th century. It is a relatively narrow frontage, with bow windows on three storeys. There is a metal canopy above the main first floor window, and a top balcony "almost as if it were in Brighton"; there may originally also have been a canopy above the top window. The building has been extended substantially to the rear. A flight of steps leads up to a side entrance.

== Later uses ==
The upper storeys of the building were a residential property until the mid-twentieth century. During the 1930s, the property was owned by Lord and Lady Raglan. In 1952, the building was sold to the British Legion, who used it as a social club. The building overlooks Chepstow's cenotaph, unveiled in 1922, which the Legion were responsible for maintaining.

In 2007, the building was bought by businessman Mike Lewis, who intended to open it as a backpackers' hostel. Refurbishment work started in 2011, and the hostel was opened in April 2016. It closed in 2024.

== Listed building status ==
The building was first given listed building status on 30 April 1956. It is recognised for its "medieval vaulted hall and Regency frontage, the best of its kind in the town." The adjoining property to the south-west, 14 Beaufort Square is also a Grade II* listed building, and the two buildings are noted for their "group value with other listed buildings in Beaufort Square and the lower part of Bank Street and High Street."
