= Glenna (given name) =

Glenna is a feminine given name. Notable people with the name include:

- Glenna Avila, American artist
- Glenna Cabello (born 1959), Venezuelan political scientist
- Glenna Collett-Vare (1903–1989), American amateur golfer
- Glenna Gallo, American educator
- Glenna Goodacre, (1939–2020), American sculptor
- Glenna Gordon (born 1981), American photojournalist
- Glenna Hansen (born 1956), Inuvialuit Canadian politician
- G. Kathleen Hill (born 1964), American diplomat
- Glenna Matoush (born 1946), Canadian visual artist
- Glenna Matthews, American historian
- Glenna Smith Tinnin (1877–1945), American suffragist
- Glenna Sue Kidd (1933–2017), American pitcher and infielder
