= National Union of Students (Canada) =

Student organization

- Abbreviation: NUS
- Successor: Canadian Federation of Students
- Formation: 1972
- Defunct: 1981
- Headquarters: Ottawa, Ontario, Canada
- Location: Canada
- Members: 350,000

The National Union of Students (NUS; French: Union nationale des étudiants [UNE]) was a national university and college student organization in Canada from November 1972 to May 1981. The union represented over 350,000 students in post-secondary education. Donald Thompson, Sidney Shugarman, Pierre Ouellette, Myron Tiechko, Daniel Palmer, Dawn Hassett, Doyle Brown and Ian Boothe are listed as the first directors.

== Mandate ==
As stated in its constitution, the NUS was created in order to defend the interests of its members and all post-secondary students, coordinate operations, provide a forum for debate and discussion, and to "act as an agent of social change". In a standing resolution, the philosophical underpinnings of the NUS are revealed. Education is considered a right in order to achieve a goal of serving "... society by developing the full potential of all citizens as free, creative, thinking and acting human beings and there-fore to serve society by helping achieve equality of the essential conditions of human living".

== Structure ==
With its head office located in Ottawa, Ontario, the NUS had a democratic structure in which elected delegates put forward, debated and decided policy through an Annual General Meeting held between April 30 and May 15 of each year. AGM locations were held in each province on a rotational basis. The union recognized individual student unions and provincial organizations as members pending a two-thirds majority vote by Central Committee. Each member organization elected one delegate to represent on Central Committee which was made up of three national directors, one treasurer, one executive officer, one chairperson, one women's commissioner, one bilingual member-at-large, one representative of the Association of Student Councils' Board of Directors, and up to ten provincial representatives. Regional or provincial organizations elected their representatives to Central Committee and all other Central Committee members were elected by the membership at large at each AGM. In addition to the Central Committee there were several standing committees and a caucus: Budget Committee (oversaw finances and controlled where dues were spent), Women's Caucus, and a Small Institutions Caucus.

== Creation and initial development ==
NUS was created by students in 1972 as a response to looming post-secondary education cuts from the federal government. The federal government instituted a ceiling on post-secondary education matching grants to provinces and territories. The prospect of reduced federal transfers for universities, increasing costs, and an all-loan student aid plan proposed by the Council of Ministers of Education, compelled students to reorganize where the Canadian Union of Students had left off in 1969.

During 1972, in the province of Ontario, the Ontario Federation of Students (OFS) was organized in response to fee deregulation and tuition increases. A member local of OFS was the University of Windsor Students' Administrative Council, which was pressing for the reorganization of a national student group. In May 1972 an inaugural conference was hosted at University of Windsor in which 26 Canadian university student unions attended. This conference laid the foundation and set the priorities and objectives of a new national student organization, which was very similar to the priorities and objectives of the Canadian Union of Students (NUS's predecessor organization of the 1960s).

On 3–5 November 1972, the National Union of Students was officially formed in Ottawa by 51 delegates representing student councils and unions from across the country. Notably absent from the NUS at this time were Quebec students and Atlantic Canadian students as their delegates were reported to have walked out.

Between 1973 and 1976, initial policy was formed and finances were organized and solidified in order to consolidate the national student movement. During these years the office was moved from University of British Columbia's Alma Mater Society in Vancouver, British Columbia to Ottawa, Ontario. In 1976/1977 the NUS was more fully organized and financially stabilized with the Atlantic Federation of Students, British Columbia Federation of Students, Alberta Federation of Students and Ontario Federation of Students, as affiliates, however, their partnership relationship with l'association nationale des étudiants du Québec (Aneq) was tenuous. The national office of the NUS employed three staff people and several campaigns were launched. By the end of 1976, NUS was on firm organizational and financial ground and had by this time launched several nationally coordinated campaigns that involved grass-roots participation at the campus level.

== Campaigns ==
The National Union of Students and its provincial affiliates were engaging in campaigns across the country to oppose government funding cuts to universities and colleges. Tuition levels, which had been frozen in the later half of the 1960s and early 1970s, were on the rise starting in 1972 and throughout the rest of the 1970s. The years 1977 and 1978 were years in which nationally coordinated student actions against tuition increases, organized by the NUS and affiliates, were held across the country.

In 1977, 1978, and 1979, the British Columbia component of NUS was actively protesting against tuition increases. The NUS also planned a National Student Day (which BCFS participated in) to protest increasing barriers to post -secondary education. Pundits characterized the NUS and BCFS opposition to government cuts as "fierce". Students in Victoria, British Columbia, gathered on University of Victoria 'Board of Governors to oppose an unprecedented 20–30% tuition fee hike. A group of about 100 angry students stormed the Board of Governors meeting room in which the fee hike was being passed. Also, in 1977 Newfoundland students at Memorial University, St. John's, were on the offensive, in coordination with NUS, in response to fee increases announced by the University on March 13.

Aside from education accessibility issues, student housing, women's equality, and student employment were seen as important issues on which to lobby the government. During its time, the NUS received criticisms from students that the union did not address other issues such as poverty, war, and environmental degradation. Some student leaders saw the NUS as too narrowly focused on lobbying government officials over "bread and butter" issues and not enough on issues "more important than free tuition."

== Amalgamation and transition 1978-1981 ==
In 1978, the NUS and the Association of Student Councils (AOSC—the predecessor to Travel Cuts), formed in 1975, were affiliated and "cooperative relations" were established with Quebec students through L'Association nationale des étudiants du Québec. By 1980, student leaders sought to better solidify the working relationship between AOSC and NUS and as a result discussions occurred at the May AGM in Halifax, Nova Scotia, to work towards consolidating what had been organized to that point. A joint AOSC–NUS plenary was held in which debate and planning occurred. Delegates at the conference discussed creating a cooperative services program and building a framework for a federation that recognized and supported provincial components as well as supported a federal organization. Meetings were held that summer between several provincial organizations and NUS. The Winnipeg conference in October 1980 approved plans to create a new federation. During 1980, campus-wide referendums were held in 23 campuses in which individual students voted yes or no for the new organization. The pro federation side won 21 out of 23 referendums by wide margins. The following year, another 20–25 referendums were held, with most being successful. A conference held in Lethbridge in May 1981 and a Carleton University conference in October that year produced the constitution, formally creating the Canadian Federation of Students.

== Women students and the women's movement in the NUS ==
Nigel Moses focused his study on young women's activism in the (Canadian) National Union of Students. He starts with the reforming of the national student organization in 1972 to the signing of the National Union of Students' (NUS) Declaration of the Rights of the Woman Student in 1979. He examines the issues NUS engaged such as violence against women and abortion rights, to sexism and outright hostility toward feminists at meetings. Moses describes the development of the women's committee and caucus and shows how women's activism and support for NUS was central to the survival of the organization. Moses asserts that NUS would not have survived the right-wing attack on NUS in the mid-1970s (a referendum-based withdrawal campaign) had it not been for the widespread support of women students on individual campuses.

Moses is critical of the historiography of the Canadian women's movement in the 1970s because it completely ignores the role of youth and women students in the women's movement. Contrary to all accounts of the women's movement in the 1970s, Moses shows convincingly that women students and young educated women were a major animating force of white feminism in NUS, on campus, and in local communities. Link label

== See also ==
- National Federation of Canadian University Students
