= Travel CUTS =

Canadian travel agency

travelcuts
- Type: Privately held company
- Industry: Tourism; Youth travel
- Founded: 1969; 57 years ago
- Headquarters: 111 Peter Street, Toronto, Canada
- Key people: Michael Merrithew, CEO
- Services: Travel agency
- Parent: Merit Travel Group
- Website: www.travelcuts.com

Travel CUTS is a Canadian travel agency specializing in youth travel. It is owned by Merit Travel Group.

It operates 19 locations in Canada, often on or near university and college campuses. "CUTS" was originally an acronym for "Canadian University Travel Service".

The website is listed by TripSavvy as one of the 6 best for finding student airfares.

== History ==
Travel CUTS had its origins in the 1950s with travel services offered by the now-defunct Canadian Union of Students ("CUS") through an unincorporated operation. After the CUS dissolved in 1969, a group of Ontario university student councils formed the Association of Ontario Student Councils, which took over the operation of the student travel service. In the next few years, the Association of Ontario Student Councils expanded across Canada and came to be called the Association of Students' Councils ("AOSC").

Travel CUTS was founded with the purpose of providing discounted travel and International Student Identity Cards to students. Under its original ownership, Travel CUTS was operated as a hybrid commercial enterprise and non-profit organization.

It thenexpanded to serve the general public as well.

As a result of legislation passed by the Canadian government requiring airline tickets to be sold through travel agents, in 1974 the AOSC incorporated a wholly owned subsidiary, "Canadian University Travel Services Limited" ("CUTS").

In 1979, CUTS established its "Student Work Abroad Program" ("SWAP"), which is still in operation. SWAP assists students to obtain the necessary documentation to travel and work in foreign countries.

In 1981, the Canadian Federation of Students ("CFS") was founded and replaced a large number of provincial and national student organizations. After its creation, CFS incorporated a separate division, CFS-Services, which took over operation of the services that had been operated by the AOSC, including CUTS. At that time, CUTS adopted the trade-name "Travel CUTS".

In 1996, the University of Western Ontario University Students' Council initiated a lawsuit against CFS-Services, alleging that it illegally transferred assets from the AOSC to itself at a 1987 meeting. The student societies of three other universities (Alma Mater Society of the University of British Columbia, Alma Mater Society of Queen's University and University of Alberta Students' Union) later joined the suit as co-plaintiffs. In March 2006, the parties settled the action out of court, resulting in the plaintiffs acquiring a minority interest of the shares of Travel CUTS and two seats on its board of directors. As a result, the CFS held 76% of the shares and the Canadian Student Horizons Group (the plaintiff student groups) held 24%.

Travel CUTS went into receivership on October 23, 2009 and several offices in Canada closed. On October 26, 2009, Merit Travel Group, a privately held Canadian travel company, purchased Travel CUTS.

In 2014, the on-campus locations of Travel CUTS were re-branded to join the flagship retail travel brand, Merit Travel. Travel CUTS became a full-service travel call centre and online travel agency.
