= National Federation of Canadian University Students =

20th-century student organization

- Abbreviation: NFCUS
- Formation: 1926
- Defunct: 1969
- Location: Canada

The National Federation of Canadian University Students (NFCUS) was a national university student organization founded in 1926. It is the oldest and first national student organization in Canada. It was the primary student organization in Canada during the 1920s, 1930s (except for the Canadian Student Assembly created in 1937), 1940s (NFCUS ceased operations from 1940 to 1946) the 1950s, and the early 1960s.

NFCUS changed its name to the Canadian Union of Students (CUS) in 1963 and continued operations under that name until CUS ceased to exist in 1969. Several ad hoc committees operated on a national level for a few years until the National Union of Students in Canada was organized in 1972.

== Formation ==
The federation was formed in Montreal in December 1926 with representatives from ten student associations. Its formation was encouraged by a former president of National Union of Students in England, Ralph Nunn May, who was touring Canada as a member of the Imperial Debating Team. NFCUS was initially established to facilitate student engagement in debating events, and to organize student exchanges, sports events, and discounts on train tickets. Although NFCUS was organized amongst other more politically involved student organizations, NFCUS remained largely apolitical in its early existence.

== Early years: 1926–1940 ==
In the 1920s and 1930s, university in Canada was the purview of the wealthy and upper middle class. University students were predominantly white males and were a minority amongst their cohort. In 1930, approximately 33,000 students attended Canadian universities full-time, which comprised three per cent of college-aged youth. Aside from regular university antics, university administrators during this time had traditionally succeeded in managing and socializing students.

Paul Axelrod, professor and Dean of the Faculty of Education at York University, asserts NFCUS had been created amongst a common desire for peace and international harmony after the carnage and collective trauma experienced as a result of the First World War. Initially NFCUS resolved to "promote national unity" through campus cooperation and to facilitate the exchange of information on student concerns. Axelrod asserts that NFCUS became an apolitical service organization for students, even during a time in the 1930s when other student groups advocated peace and social change, "NFCUS avoided taking controversial positions on issues of the day." This is consistent with Nigel Moses and Robert Fredrick Clift's assessment of NFCUS in its early days. Canadian university administrators were warm to NFCUS and saw it as part of student learning and development on campus. Surveillance reports of the Royal Canadian Mounted Police mention NFCUS as a "reliable and approved institution". Other groups, many inspired by the Social Gospel movement, were more active on social justice initiatives, such as the Student Christian Movement, the Canadian Youth Congress, and the Canadian Student Assembly (created in 1937). There were students involved in activism resembling a type of student movement at the time, but as Axelrod wrote, the campus culture of conformity and repressive nature of university administrators made it difficult for students to express independent political views. It was not uncommon for editors of newspapers and student councilors to lose their positions after criticizing the university, government, or the dominant order.

== Middle years: 1940–1963 ==
In 1940, NFCUS shut down operations so that university students could concentrate on Canada's prosecution of the Second World War. NFCUS restarted in 1946 (with a false start in 1944 and 1945). In Nigel Moses' doctoral thesis, he suggests that the influx of veterans with working-class origins is related to the re-emergence of NFCUS in 1946–1947. In a subsequent article, Moses states that:

The NFCUS of the late 1940s and early 1950s was not just a straightforward continuation of the rather conservative NFCUS of the 1930s ... In the late 1930s, it was the Canadian Student Assembly (CSA), founded in 1938, not the NFCUS that pursued a campaign to pressure the federal government to provide a thousand student bursaries worth $500 each. So the post-war NFCUS was really an heir to the CSA and NFCUS of the 1930s.

After the Second World War, service men and women received the Veterans Affairs University Training Allowance and the subsequent increase in presence of veterans is thought to have changed the social composition and customs of university life. Their presence in post secondary institutions was significant; during the 1945/1946 academic year some 30,000 (roughly half the Canadian university student population) veterans attended university, 23,000 in 1948–1949, and 14,500 in 1949–1950. The numbers of ex-service men and women tapers off by 1955–1956. Most of the veterans were older, many were working class, and they were reported to have commanded respect from peers and professors. According to research by Helen Lefkowitz Horowitz (Professor of History at Smith College), these veterans, after fighting a world war against fascism, challenged the elitist norms and customs of the university and had an ever-lasting effect on the university system in Canada.

NFCUS reemerged after the war in 1944 and 1945, however there was disagreement over continuity from 1940). However, by 1946 a conference was organized and held at the University of Toronto where Maurice Sauvé was elected president. By the mid-1950s, with university enrollment down which resulted in low funds, student councils pulled out of NFCUS, putting its existence in danger. By 1953, tensions with Quebec were becoming apparent as delegates disagreed over questions of federal aid versus Quebec students' prerogative to lobby their provincial government. In March 1956, McGill University, University of British Columbia, University of Toronto, Université de Montréal and University of Manitoba had left NFCUS. NFCUS recovered in the late 1950s after it invested considerable time convincing local student councils of the 'usefulness' of the federation. Also, enrolment crept up again and NFCUS improved its student travel discount program. In return, university student councils played a more active role in NFCUS as responsibility for selecting delegates became the responsibility of the councils (instead of local NFCUS committees). As a result of these efforts, NFCUS was able to hire more staff, balance its budget, and engage in government lobbying with respect to funding for universities. The late 1950s was a turning point for NFCUS.

By 1957, NFCUS rebounded from the mid-1950s doldrums. Alliances were made with university professors through their newly formed (1951) union, Canadian Association of University Teachers (CAUT), and the National Conference of Canadian Universities (NCCU, today known as the Association of Universities and Colleges of Canada (AUCC)). In 1957, NFCUS also resolved to fight for financial aid for any "needy and worthy" student.

From the late 1950s to the early 1960s, government aid for university students was NFCUS' primary objective on the national level. Annual briefs were researched, written and published by NFCUS and presented to provincial and federal governments. A former NFCUS president (1959–1960), Jacques Gérin, recounts NFCUS' political aims at the time:

The first and foremost [issue] was more money for education, namely scholarships for students, accessibility to education. We argued for reduced costs. The issue in those days was that university education was for a reserved lot: privileged students who had the means. And that meant only 8% of the student-aged population was at university. So at all levels—provincially, nationally—that was the big fight—to open up university education.

Through years of lobbying the federal government, NFCUS (by 1964 was known as CUS) finally had a breakthrough with the Liberal Party of Canada in 1964. The Liberal Party adopted the NFCUS student aid proposal, but with one key difference, Liberals opted for student loans instead of non-repayable assistance in the form of bursaries, which NFCUS had been pushing for. Many students felt betrayed by the Liberal Party's creation of the Canada Student Loans Program in 1964.

== Canadian Union of Students: 1963–1969 ==
The Canadian Union of Students (CUS) formed in 1963 from the NFCUS. CUS, like NFCUS, was essentially a binational coalition of student councils at Canadian universities.

Throughout the 1960s, CUS became increasing anti-war and Marxist-inspired, in part as a result of the Student Union for Peace Action especially after it ceased operating in 1966, following the creation of the Company of Young Canadians. CUS's increasing critique of capitalism and the US war on Vietnam led to a reaction by many CUS members who orchestrated a series of withdrawal referendums. CUS became non-viable by 1969 and ceased operating. Canadian students were without a formal national student organization until the National Union of Students (Canada), the precursor of the Canadian Federation of Students, was formed in 1972. Thus the National Federation of Canadian University Students (NFCUS) and the left-wing Canadian Student Assembly (CSA) of the 1930s, to the reformed NFCUS after 1944, to CUS in the sixties, to NUS in the seventies, to CFS of 1981 on, represents a long tradition of national student organizing in Canada.

Quebec members of CUS could not support federal funding of a provincial jurisdiction that was inherent in the Canada Student Loan Program, established in 1964. CUS lost most Quebec members, who broke from CUS and formed Union général des étudiants du Québec.

Moses argues that CUS became highly vulnerable in the late 1960s because it had lost its traditional movement catalysts: by 1966, student loans and bursaries had never been so good, tuition fees were frozen and students were being taken seriously by politicians and given representation in university governance—all of these things had been key demands of NFCUS and CUS. In other words, CUS had fallen victim to its own success. It had realized its raisons d'être policies at the same time it was radicalizing over the Vietnam War. As James Harding would put it, SUPA and de facto CUS, would become after 1967, "an ethical movement in search of an analysis".

The main point that pervades Moses's work (1995, 2001, 2004) is that students had the ability to change the conditions of historicity, an idea he borrows from the French sociologist Alain Touraine. Moses explains that historicity can be understood as the sum total of social relations and cultural orientations of social actors that exist at any one time. Moses claims NFCUS and CUS activism helped change the conditions of historicity during the 1960s. This is evident in the policies of the Canada Student Loan Program and various provincial student aid programs, relatively stable tuition fees (until late 1970s) and realization of academocracy; that is, representation on university governance. As significant change agents of state policies in the 1960s, NFCUS and CUS activism of the 1950s and 1960s would have a bearing on the more institutionalized forms and practices of student organizations in the 1970s and thereafter. Moses argues that by helping shift the social relations on the "historical field of action' in particular, student organizations-state relations, NFCUS and CUS were key social agents in the formation of Canadian democratic institutions, most obviously, increased access to postsecondary education.

== International affairs and participation in the International Union of Students and the International Student Conference ==
Moses (2006) article "Canadian Student Movements on the Cold War Battlefield, 1944–1954" goes into great detail on NFCUS' involvement in international affairs and in the two international student organizations. Moses shows how the devastation of the Second World War, impelled students around the world (with the financial support of the Soviet Union) to form the International Union of Students (IUS). National student organizations around the world, including NFCUS, were eager to form such an international student organization, in part, to help thwart the possibility of yet another (nuclear) world war.

As Moses (2006) shows, in one way or another, Canadian students and student veterans linked to NFCUS were involved in the early formation of the IUS. In 1944, at the first NFCUS conference since ceasing operations in 1940, NFCUS leaders immediately grappled with defining NFCUS' role in international development and in the early discussions on forming the IUS. It soon became apparent to NFCUS delegates to IUS that the sympathies of its members were toward the Soviet Union and against continued global capitalist expansion.

In 1950, with the covert assistance of the CIA, the International Student Conference (ISC) and its Coordinating Secretariat (CoSec) were created. (The CIA which formed in the same year as the US National Student Association—1947—had completely taken-over the international activities of the US National Student Association). Drawing mainly from the work of Joel Kotek and Karen Paget (2003), Moses describes how the ISC was created under the stewardship of the CIA mainly to undermine the Soviet-influenced IUS which was active in anticolonial national movements and promoting Soviet communism in general. The ISC created a parallel or alternative international student organization that ultimately succeeded in dividing students internationally throughout the Cold War until 1966.

NFCUS became embroiled in a cold war struggle for the hearts and minds of the world's youth leaders; the Soviets, and soon after, the Americans, reasoned (correctly) that national student organizations were powerful social agents of state formation. This was especially so in struggles for national liberation and decolonialization. The Soviets and Americans knew that student leaders within a few years would 'graduate' to key positions in national governments. So governments on both sides of the Iron Curtain strove to cultivate the political sympathies and support of student leaders internationally – as well, collect intelligence on them. The Soviets hoped to gain the support of the leaders of newly liberated former colonies; the US needed a foil to stop this, and thus the ISC was created.

NFCUS leaders would come in regular contact with covert operatives of Soviet, American and European governments. For example, Moses documents how starting in the early 1950s, delegates of the US National Student Association (CIA operatives), would regularly attend and formally and informally address NFCUS meetings and seminars. However, Moses's work raises more questions than it answers: it is not clear for example how effective the US's cultural cold war offensive was on the minds of Canadians throughout the 1950s until 1967, when the NSA-CIA link was revealed in Ramparts magazine.

Karen Paget's 2015 book, Patriotic Betrayal: The Inside Story of the CIA's Secret Campaign to Enroll American Students in the Crusade Against Communism, documents how the CIA used the USNSA National Student Association to recruit students as undercover agents inside America and abroad.

== Influence of Quebec syndicalism ==
Tensions with French Canadian students inside NFCUS became apparent by 1961. The student society at the Université de Montréal (Association général des étudiants de l'Université de Montréal—AGEUM) had adopted a manifesto entitled "Charte de l'étudiant universitaire", which declared students as intellectual workers, which could and should be catalysts for social change. Thus, "student syndicalism" became a distinct attribute of Quebec students. At this time NFCUS was still careful not to engage in politics outside of student issues. Also, the "Quiet Revolution" in Quebec, which secularized Quebec society and divided Quebec politics along federalist and nationalist lines, had major influences on Quebec's students. In 1962, at the NFCUS national Congress, an English document, which mirrored the "Charte de l'étudiant universitaire", was introduced; however, most English delegates were against it and it did not pass. Also in 1962, Quebec students began to organize themselves into the Union générale des étudiants du Québec (UGEQ), which caused considerable distress among members of the NFCUS.

It was the influence of student syndicalism in France and Quebec that helped change NFCUS into a student movement and less of a service and single-issue lobby group. At the 1963 NFCUS Congress, NFCUS' name was changed to Canadian Union of Students (CUS), in order to recognize Quebec's unique status. CUS also became a French and English organization, instituted a bi-national veto in its constitution, and adopted an agreement to cease lobbying the federal government. However, by 1964, this arrangement fell apart and many of Quebec's universities pulled out of CUS in order to join the UGEQ, which had been officially created that year. Quebec students were more interested in provincial politics and felt CUS' bias towards lobbying of the federal government conflicted with their nationalist orientation.

== Final years: 1964–1969 ==
In the 1964–1965 school year, tuition fee levels across Canada increased markedly in response to the initialization of CSLP. In 1964, a tuition freeze position was adopted by delegates, and in 1965 a tuition abolition position was taken at national Congress. Students at the local level became more combative which took university administrators by surprise. Individual student councils pointed to progressive tax reform, which would pay for post-secondary education and make tuition fees redundant. Also, inspired by the Students for a Democratic Society and the civil rights movement, students councils in cooperation with CUS began to organize rallies and other actions on campuses. In response to years of intense lobbying by NFCUS and CUS, along with the tuition freeze and tuition abolition movements on campus, tuition fees were frozen in Canada in 1965.

During this time CUS had radicalized, and became more critical of the university system and the political order. New Left politics, the war in Vietnam, Students for a Democratic Society, and the black power movement had influenced leaders in the CUS. However, the fee freeze and the infiltration of right-wing students aligned with the administration, undermined the CUS and served to drive New Left students out of the Union and into other organizations on campus. Several student councils/unions initiated pull-outs at the same time, which put immense strain on the CUS. This led to the collapse of CUS in 1969. Students met provincially and nationally through ad hoc committees; however, students lacked a coherent nationwide organization from 1969 to 1972.
