= 14 Beaufort Square, Chepstow =

Townhouse of medieval origin in Chepstow, Wales

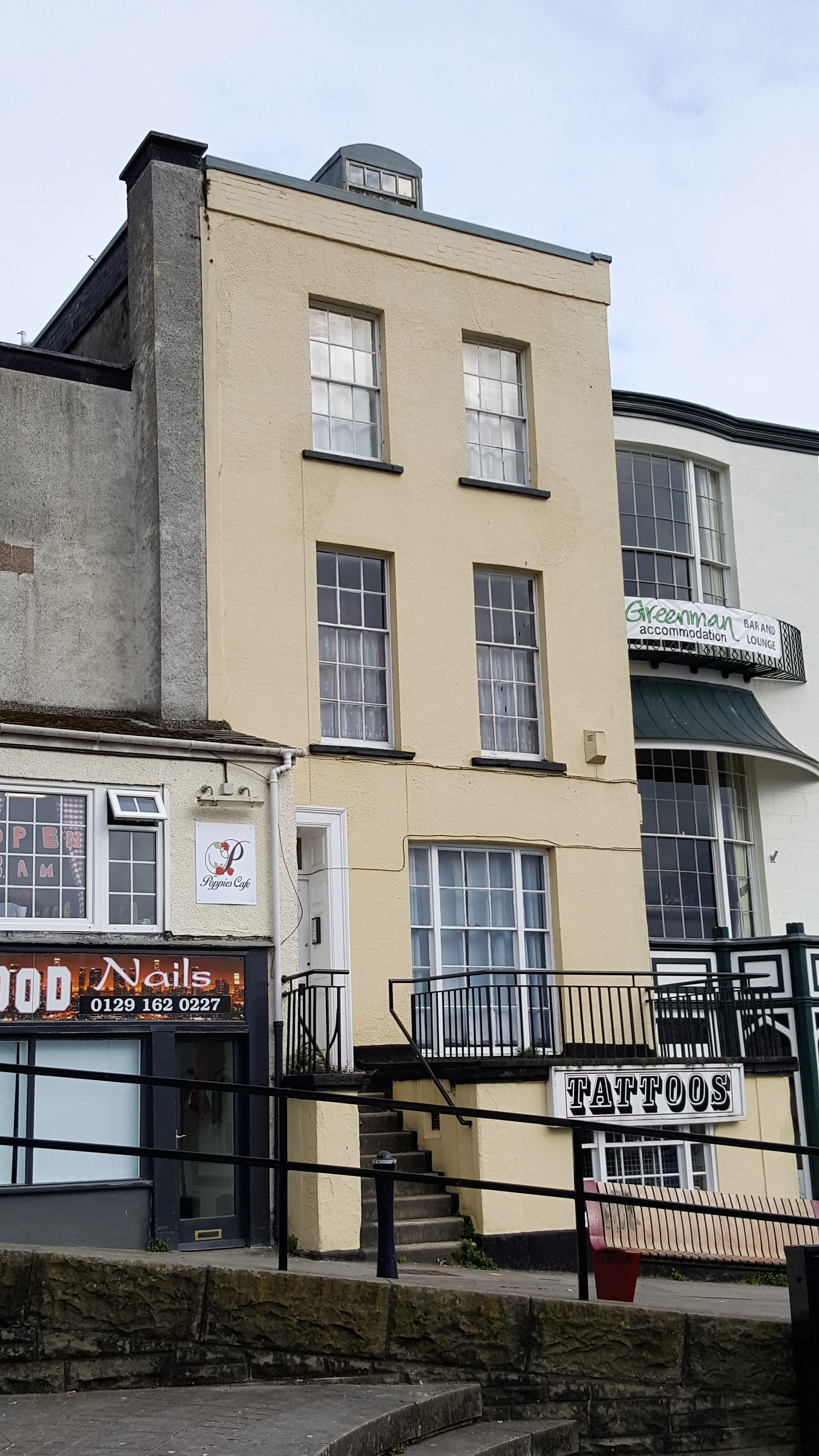

- Location within Monmouthshire
- 51.6422°N 2.6753°W
- Type: House
- Location: Chepstow, Monmouthshire

History
- Built: Medieval origins, most C.19th

Site notes
- Architectural style: Regency
- Governing body: Privately owned

Listed Building – Grade II*
- Official name: 14 Beaufort Square, Chepstow
- Designated: 12 June 1950
- Reference no.: 2502

14 Beaufort Square in Chepstow, Monmouthshire, Wales, is a townhouse of medieval origins. The present building was mainly constructed in the early 19th century. It is a Grade II* listed building.

== History ==
The origin of the building is medieval. Its basement, which also runs under No.13, Raglan Lodge, has a vaulted medieval roof which may have been the roof of a 14th-century moot hall. The building above the basement is 19th century. In the 20th and 21st centuries, No.14, which is also known as Richmond House, has been used predominantly for commercial purposes and the building until recently housed a tattoo parlour on the ground floor and commercial offices and flats above.

== Architecture and description ==
The house is of three storeys, with an attic and basement. The building is in a Regency style, of a similar date to the adjoining Raglan Lodge. A balcony originally on the first floor has been removed. The roof of the medieval basement incorporates "two carved stone heads". The house is Grade II* listed.
