= Karen Paget =

American Political Scientist and Author

Karen M. Paget
- Education: University of Colorado
- Writing career
- Genre: non-fiction
- Website: karenmpaget.com

Karen M. Paget is an American political scientist, from Boulder, Colorado, United States. She is the author of non-fiction books. Her work appears at The American Prospect.

== Life ==
She holds a doctorate from the University of Colorado and a M.A. in International Relations.

She is the author of the book Patriotic Betrayal: The Inside Story of the CIA’s Secret Campaign to Enroll American Students in the Crusade Against Communism, launched in March 2015.

After more than a decade of research, Karen Paget gathered archival sources, declassified documents, and interviews, showing that the National Student Association story published by Ramparts, was just part of a bigger CIA operation.

== Works ==
- Patriotic Betrayal: The Inside Story of the CIA’s Secret Campaign to Enroll American Students in the Crusade Against Communism, New Haven: Yale University Press, 2015, ISBN 9780300205084, OCLC 887450741
- Linda Witt; Karen M Paget; Glenna Matthews, Running as a Woman: Gender and Power The Free Press, 1993, ISBN 9780029203156, OCLC 478789879
