= Backpacking (travel) =

Style of frugal travel

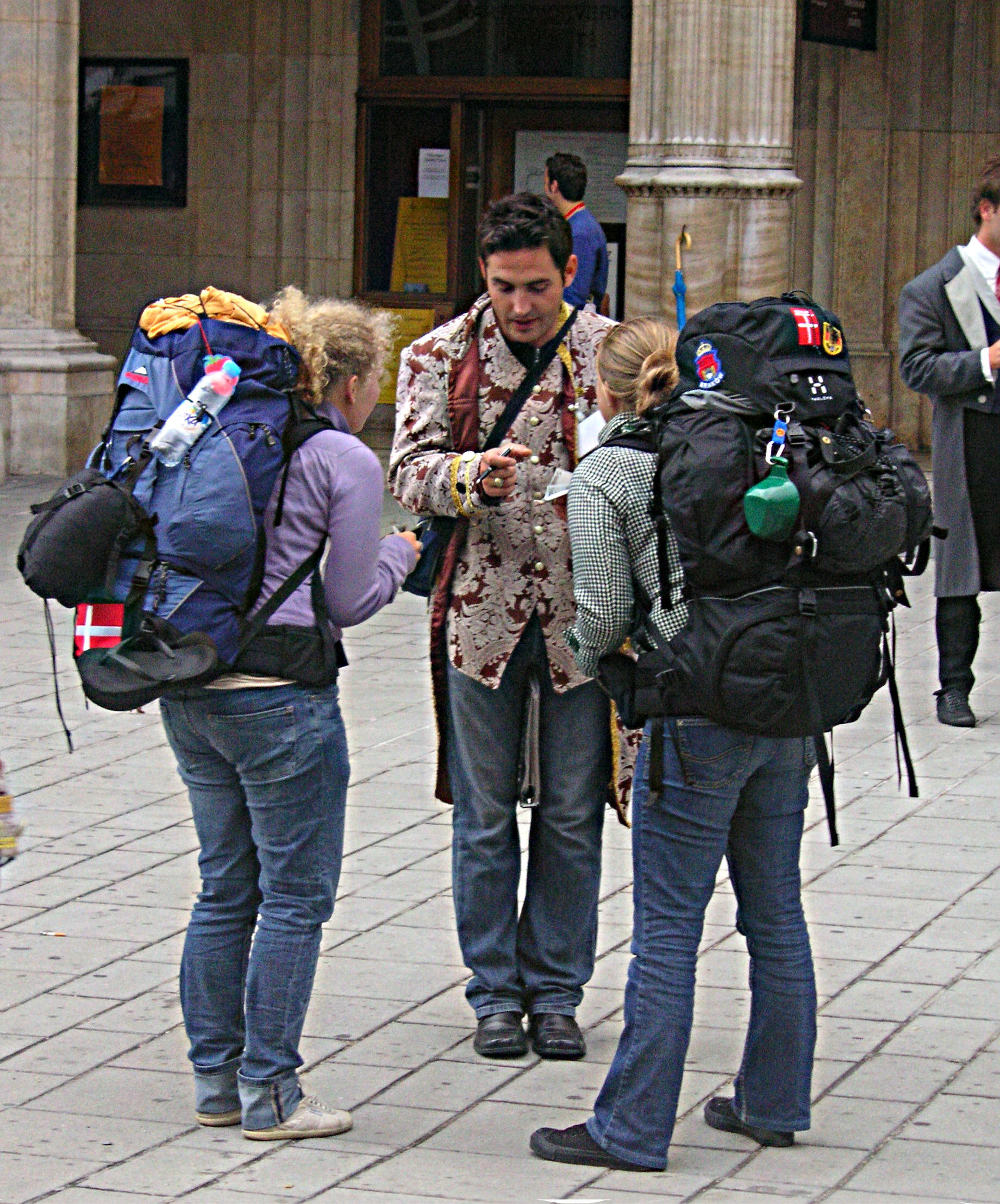
Backpackers in Vienna

Backpacking is a form of low-cost, independent travel, which often includes staying in inexpensive lodgings and carrying all necessary possessions in a backpack. Once seen as a marginal form of travel undertaken only through necessity, it has become a mainstream form of tourism.

While backpacker tourism is generally a form of youth travel, primarily undertaken by young people during gap years, it is also undertaken by older people during holidays, a career break, or at retirement, or by digital nomads, as part of a minimalist lifestyle. As such, backpackers can be of any age, but are typically aged 18 to 30.

== Characteristics ==
Backpacker tourism generally, but does not always, include:

- Traveling internationally for long periods of time on a tight budget, foregoing luxury and being resourceful.
- Traveling via public transport or hitchhiking, using inexpensive lodging such as hostels or homestays, and other methods of lowering costs.
- Working in other countries for short stints, depending on work permit laws. It can also be undertaken by digital nomads, people who work using technology while living a nomadic lifestyle.
- A search for authenticity. Backpacking is perceived not only as a form of tourism but as a means of education or personal growth. Backpackers want to experience what they consider the "real" destination rather than a packaged version often associated with mass tourism.
- The desire to take part in or to create a narrative around traveling.

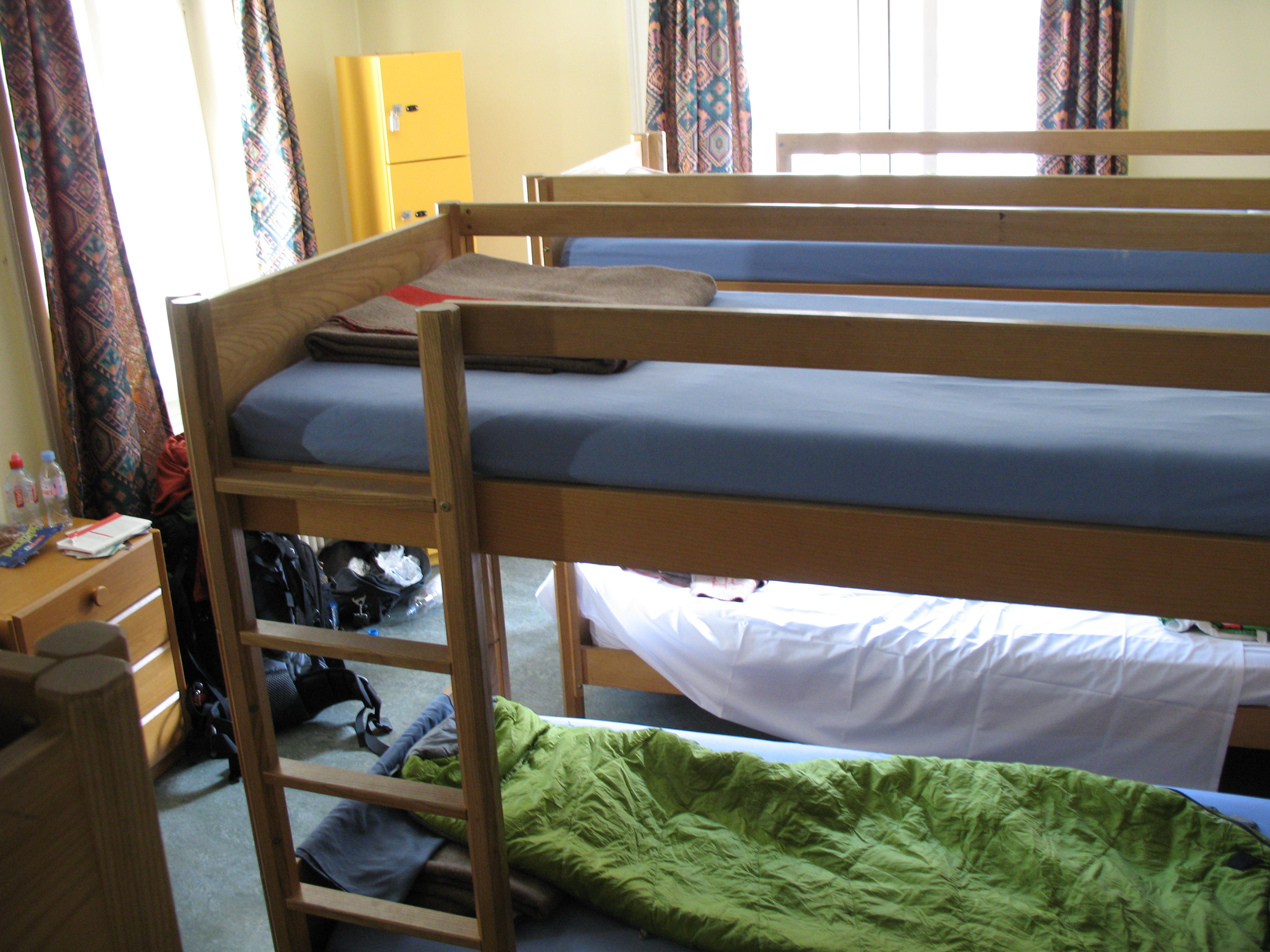
Bunk beds in a hostel in Zürich

== History ==
People have travelled for thousands of years with their possessions on their backs, but usually out of need rather than for recreation. Between 3400 and 3100 BC, Ötzi the Iceman was traveling in Italy with a backpack made of animal skins and a wooden frame, although there are some thoughts that this may actually have been his snowshoes. In the 7th century, Xuanzang, a Chinese Buddhist monk, travelled to India with a hand-made backpack.

In the 17th century, Italian adventurer Giovanni Francesco Gemelli Careri was likely one of the first people to engage in backpacker tourism.

The modern popularity of backpacking can be traced, at least partially, to the hippie trail of the 1960s and 1970s, which in turn followed sections of the old Silk Road. Some backpackers follow the same trail today. Since the late-20th century, backpackers have visited Southeast Asia in large numbers.

=== Benefits ===
A 2018 study of over 500 backpackers conducted by researchers at Sun Yat-sen University and Shaanxi Normal University in China and Edith Cowan University in Australia showed that for Westerners, backpacking leads to acquired capabilities like effective communication, decision-making, adaptability, and problem solving, all of which contribute to an increase in self-efficacy, and for Chinese backpackers, acquiring skills like time and money management, language development, stress management, and self-motivation provided the biggest increase in self-efficacy.

Mark Hampton of the University of Kent, writing for The Guardian, argued in 2010 that for many low-income communities in the developing world, the economic benefits of hosting backpackers outweigh their negative impacts. Since backpackers tend to consume local products, stay in small guest houses, and use locally owned ground transport, more of their expenditure is retained in-country than in conventional mass tourism.

=== Criticism ===
Backpacker tourism of the hippie trail has been criticized for possibly encouraging urban liberal minorities while insulting Islamic traditionalist theology, possibly contributing to the Islamic reawakening in the late 1970s.

Backpacker tourism has been criticized for the transformation of some sleepy towns, such as the creation of the Full Moon Party on Ko Pha-ngan in Thailand, which includes "scores of topless teenagers urinating into the ocean".

== Variants ==
Flashpacking and Poshpacking refer to backpacking with more money and resources. The words combine backpacking with flash, a slang term for being fancy, or posh, an informal adjective for upper class.

Begpacking combines begging and backpacking in reference to individuals who beg (ask directly or indirectly for money), solicit money during street performances, or vend (sell postcards or other small items) as a way to extend their overseas travel. The trend has drawn criticism for taking money away from people in actual need, with one known begpacker barred from entering Singapore. Begpacking is common in Southeast Asia and is a trend in South America and South Korea.
