= Dnata Travel Services =

Companies based in Dubai

dnata Travel
- Headquarters: Dubai, United Arab Emirates
- Website: www.dnata.com/en/travel

dnata Travel is an Emirati travel services company based in Dubai.

== History ==
On June 27, 2008 dnata Travel Services bought a 20% stake in United Kingdom-based Hogg Robinson Group making it the largest shareholder of that company.

== Locations ==
dnata Travel has its headquarters located in dnata Airline Center in the Sheikh Zayed Road, Dubai, UAE. As the retail arm of dnata offering travel services and products, dnata Travel Services has 44 retail outlets scattered within Dubai.

In January 2009, dnata Travel Services and HRG launched a satellite in Kabul, Afghanistan., expanding the company's reach further outward in the Middle East region.

== Awards and achievements ==
- World’s Leading Travel Management Company: World Travel Awards 2009.
- UAE's Leading Destination Management Company: Gulf Ventures - World Travel Awards 2009
