= Bruce Tate =

American writer

Bruce A. Tate is an American author on computer programming topics. He has written about the Java and Elixir programming languages, the Ruby language and its associated Ruby on Rails framework, and other computer software.

Tate is the CTO of icanmakeitbetter.com and the editor of Elixir books for Addison-Wesley's Pragmatic Bookshelf imprint.

== Works ==
- Adopting Elixir
- Better, Faster, Lighter Java
- Beyond Java: A Glimpse at the Future of Programming Languages
- Bitter EJB, co-authored a critical analysis of Enterprise Java Beans
- Bitter Java, a critical analysis of Java
- Deploying Rails Applications
- Designing Elixir Systems with OTP
- From Java to Ruby: Things Every Manager Should Know
- Programming Phoenix
- Rails: Up and Running
- Seven Languages in Seven Weeks
- Seven More Languages in Seven Weeks
