= Glenna Matthews =

American historian

- Occupation: Historian
- Employer(s): Oklahoma State University, Stanford University, University of California, Berkeley, University of California, Los Angeles
- Known for: Women's history, California history
- Awards: Fulbright scholar

Academic background
- Education: San José State University (BA), Stanford University (Ph.D.)

Academic work
- Notable works: Just a Housewife: The Rise and Fall of Domesticity in America

Glenna Matthews is an American historian.

== Biography ==
Glenna Matthews graduated in 1969 with a bachelor in Arts degree from San José State University. She later completed her Ph.D. from Stanford University in 1977. She went on to teach at Oklahoma State University, Stanford, Berkeley, and University of California, Los Angeles. She retired from university but continues to lecture on history. She has been a consultant on the film Indians, Outlaws and Angie Debo in 1989. She has written several books about American women's history. She has received fellowships the National Endowment for the Humanities as well as being a Fulbright scholar. Using interviews created for her book on Silicon valley Matthews created the Glenna Matthews Oral History Collection, 1984-2014 which contains fifty-one oral histories.

== Bibliography ==
- “Just a Housewife”: The Rise and Fall of Domesticity in America ISBN 9780195059250
- The Rise of Public Woman: Woman’s Power and Woman’s Place, 1630–1970. ISBN 9780199951314
- Silicon Valley, Women, and the California Dream ISBN 9780804741545
- The Golden State in the Civil War ISBN 9780521194006
