= International Student Identity Card =

Internationally accepted proof of student status

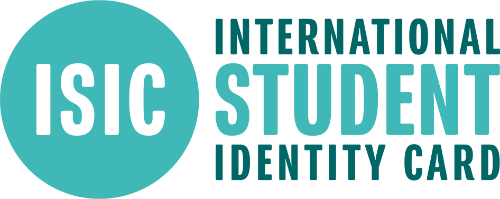
- Formation: 1953
- Type: Nonprofit organization
- Legal status: Active
- Headquarters: Copenhagen, Denmark
- Region served: 130+ countries worldwide
- Official language: English (internal communication)
- ISIC Association Board Chair: Milos Milenkovic
- Main organ: ISIC Association Board
- Website: isic.org

The International Student Identity Card (ISIC) serves as internationally recognized proof of student status and offers access to various benefits and discounts globally, including travel, accommodation, and cultural institutions. The ISIC Association also issues the International Youth Travel Card (IYTC) for non-students, and the International Teacher Identity Card (ITIC) for teachers and professors. Membership fees for these cards vary by country.

== ISIC Association ==
The ISIC Association is a non-profit membership organisation legally registered in Denmark.

The ISIC card is administered and managed at a global level by the ISIC Service Office d.o.o. The ISIC Service Office d.o.o is a company seated in Belgrade, Serbia. The ISIC Service Office d.o.o is wholly owned by the ISIC Association.

== ISIC card distribution ==
ISIC Exclusive Representatives, who have the exclusive rights to issue ISIC cards in their respective countries, make up a global distribution network for ISIC cards. The ISIC card is available in over 130 countries. In each country, the ISIC Exclusive Representative is exclusively responsible for ISIC card distribution, promotion and development, including the development and managing a portfolio of local and national benefits and discounts, and services available to the ISIC holders.

== ISIC card today ==
Eligibility for the International Student Identity Card (ISIC) is limited to students in higher, tertiary, or full-time secondary education, with a minimum age requirement of 12 years. There is no upper age limit for obtaining an ISIC card. The validity of an ISIC card spans 16 months, aligning with the academic year of the country where it is purchased.

=== Brand refresh ===
The idea to conduct an ISIC Brand refresh originated in 2017, and was subsequently launched in May 2019.

== Endorsement & Alliances of the ISIC ==
=== UNESCO Endorsement ===
The United Nations Educational, Scientific and Cultural Organization (UNESCO) has been involved in the ISIC development almost since the beginning. UNESCO joined the International Student Travel Conference in 1995 and supported the ISIC card. In 1968 UNESCO issued an official endorsement in full support of the ISIC card. UNESCO recognised the ISIC card as the only internationally accepted proof of full-time student status and a unique document encouraging cultural exchange and international understanding. A renewed Memorandum of Understanding was signed in 1993. The UNESCO logo has appeared on the ISIC card since 1993. UNESCO recognises the ISIC card as a unique document encouraging cultural exchange and international understanding.

=== British Council and Global Study Awards ===
This initiative was launched by the British Council IELTS, Studyportals and the ISIC Association in 2015. The goal of these annual awards is to encourage and support more students undertaking study abroad. This award is available in all countries worldwide. In total there have been 17 winners in 5 rounds

=== Other Global Endorsement ===
- AIESEC
- Community of Andean Nations
- International Association of Universities
- International Pharmaceutical Federation
- European Students' Union
- European Law Students' Association (ELSA)
- European Youth Card Association (EYCA)
- World Youth Student Education Travel Confederation (WYSETC)
- Hosteling International Partnership (HIP)
- World Savings Banks Institute (WSBI)

=== Strategic global partners ===
- Mastercard
- British Council
- Education First
- FlixBus
- Hard Rock Café
- The Economist
- Homestay
- Hostelsclub
- Hostelworld
- Hotels.com
- Lonely Planet
- SANDEMANs
- Withlocals
- Career Width

== The ISIC Event ==
The ISIC Event

The ISIC Event
