= Youth travel =

Travel by youth

Youth travel is travel by youth. Unlike typical vacations, youth travel is motivated by several factors, including the desire to experience other cultures, build unique life experience, and benefit from formal and informal learning opportunities from other countries, including education or work abroad.

In 2017, the top destinations for youth travel were the United States, Spain, France, Italy, the United Kingdom, Germany, the Netherlands, Australia, Thailand, and Austria.

The youth travel market accounted for over 20% of all international arrivals in 2014 (equals to 227 million arrivals and US$250 billion). It is estimated that youth and student travel will generate more international arrivals than business travel by the end of this year.

Youth travellers stay longer (average 53 days), they spend more (US$1,000 to US$6,000 per trip) and travel more frequently (1.44 trip pa) than the average tourist while they use their money with local retailers.

Youth travel has been a stable and ongoingly growing industry. Boasting continued growth also during and despite the global economic downturn – outperforming global tourism (e.g. in 2012, 28.8% 5YTD increase in Higher Education).

Youth travel influences the size and patterns of global tourism development. Young travellers form their future purchasing and travelling patterns often based on their youth travel experiences (estimated lifetime travel budget at US$80,000).

A conservative estimate predicts that the youth, student and educational travel market will reach 300 million arrivals by 2020 and represent US$320 billion in market value.

Youth travel is becoming increasingly more important within global tourism. In the 1990s, it represented 15% of the tourism market, with it increasing to 20% in the last decade, and expected to reach 25% in the near future.

Rapidly rising middle class (from current US$2 billion to US$5 billion in 2030) and increased access to more disposable income, means more purchasing power – the number of youth travellers is on the rise – in 2012, nearly 30% of young people described themselves as ”tourists” compared to about 15% in 2002.

Diversification in destinations and source markets has seen growth at the expense of developed countries across all youth travel sectors, incl. student and educational travel market.

Brazil, India, China or other emerging countries have been the markets of interest for many governments, destinations, investment capital or international brands wanting to develop and expand. They are recovering and rising faster than developed countries - gaining an increasingly more global market share.

Internet is used more for reference, social content (reviews, rankings, sharing, recommendations) and travel planning (destination research) than for actual online shopping and booking. This slower growth of online booking in youth travel as opposed to global tourism underlines the importance of tour operators and travel agencies to the youth market.

Tour operators and travel agencies represent an important distribution, booking and promotional channel in youth travel, accounting for up to 80% of all bookings, with increasing trend of their usage by end customers. There are more than 16,000 student tour operators and travel agencies estimated in this market.

== See also ==
- Adventure Travel
- Au pair
- Backpacker tourism
- Exchange program
- Higher education
- Language travel
- School trips
- Sports tourism
- Insurance
- Flights
- Student card
- Summer camp
- Work abroad
- Volunteering
- Student housing
