= List of Beta Gamma Sigma members =

Beta Gamma Sigma is an international business honor society. Founded in 1913 at the University of Wisconsin, University of Illinois, and the University of California, it has over 980,000 members at more than 600 collegiate chapters. Following are some of the notable members of Beta Gamma Sigma.

== Academics ==
- Dimitri Azar (2011), ophthalmologist and dean of the College of Medicine at the University of Illinois at Chicago
- Ricardo Azziz (2000) president of Georgia Regents University
- Karen Boroff, former dean of Seton Hall University’s Stillman School of Business
- John R. Brazil, president of Trinity University and Southeastern Massachusetts University
- Garfield V. Cox, dean of the University of Chicago School of Business
- Dennis Dease (2013) president of the University of St. Thomas
- David Dodd, professor and associate dean at the Columbia Business School
- Richard F. Ericson, organizational theorist and professor emeritus of management at George Washington University
- William Dudley Geer, dean of the School of Business at Samford University
- Matthew Goldstein, chancellor of the City University of New York and president of Baruch College and Adelphi University
- Camilo R. Gomez (2006), neurologist and founding director of the stroke centers at University of Alabama at Birmingham and Saint Louis University
- John Graham (1988), financial economist and professor at the Duke University Fuqua School of Business
- Edward C. Halperin, chancellor and CEO of New York Medical College
- James C. Hickman, professor emeritus of business and statistics and former dean of the University of Wisconsin–Madison School of Business
- Bengt Holmstrom, winner of the 2016 Nobel Prize in Economics and professor of economics at the Massachusetts Institute of Technology
- William N. Kinnard, emeritus professor of finance and real estate at the University of Connecticut
- Manfred Kirchgeorg, chair of marketing at HHL Leipzig Graduate School of Management
- Eric Li (2004) adjunct professor at the School of Accountancy of the Chinese University of Hong Kong and the School of Business of Hong Kong Baptist University
- Beaufort Longest, professor emeritus of health policy and management at the University of Pittsburgh
- Victor Mbarika, professor at East Carolina University
- Schuyler F. Otteson, dean of the Kelley School of Business at Indiana University
- Niranjan Pati, professor of management and entrepreneurship at the Rohrer College of Business, Rowan University
- Nido Qubein, president of High Point University
- Jeanine Rhea, professor emeritus in the Department of Management in the William S. Spears School of Business at Oklahoma State University
- Lowell C. Smith, president of Nichols College
- Heinz Weihrich, professor of global management and administration at the University of San Francisco
- B. Joseph White, president emeritus of the University of Illinois
- Daniel Asua Wubah (2007), president of Millersville University of Pennsylvania
- Joe B. Wyatt, chancellor of Vanderbilt University
- Mark Zupan, professor of economics and a dean at University of Rochester's Simon Business School

== Business ==
- Dennis C. Bottorff (1968), CEO of the First American Corporation and chairman of the Tennessee Valley Authority
- Warren Buffett, the chairman and CEO of Berkshire Hathaway
- Ann-Marie Campbell, executive vice-president of The Home Depot
- Adam Cahan, senior vice president of Mobile and Emerging Products for Yahoo!
- Vin Cipolla, entrepreneur
- Maryjo Cohen, CEO of National Presto Industries
- Daniel A. D'Aniello, cofounder and chairman of the Carlyle Group
- Tony Falkenstein, entrepreneur
- Fred Fraenkel, investment professional and was a vice chair of Cowen Inc.
- Marillyn Hewson, president and CEO of Lockheed Martin
- Henry Jackson, investor and entrepreneur
- Anshu Jain, president of the financial services firm Cantor Fitzgerald
- Alex Klokus, co-founder of Gravity Blanket
- Sallie Krawcheck, former head of Bank of America's Global Wealth and Investment Management division and CEO and co-founder of Ellevest
- Ellen Kullman, former board chair and CEO of DuPont
- Jim Louderback, CEO of VidCon and Revision3
- Robert Maynard Jr., co-founder of LifeLock and Internet America
- Robert T. McCowan, president of Ashland Petroleum and executive vice chairman of Ashland, Inc.
- Todd Miller, CEO of Celestial Tiger Entertainment
- Philip Chen Nan-lok, CEO and deputy chairman of Cathay Pacific
- Robert Niblock, chairman, president and CEO of Lowe's
- Kenneth T. Norris Jr., president, CEO, and chairman of Norris Industries
- Gary Parr, senior managing director of Apollo Global Management
- Rebecca W. Rimel, president and CEO of The Pew Charitable Trusts
- David Rockefeller, economist and investment banker who served as chairman and chief executive of Chase Manhattan Corporation
- Daniel Scotto (2008), analyst with BNP Paribas
- Michael Jay Solomon, founder, chairman, and president of several publicly and privately held companies
- Paul Wachter, businessman and investment adviser
- John Zeglis, president of AT&T and chairman and CEO of AT&T Wireless

== Computer science ==
- Lam M. Nguyen, computer scientist and applied mathematician; Research Scientist at IBM Research.

== Entertainment ==
- Wendy Aylsworth, television and motion picture technology executive
- John Hanki, inventor of Pokémon Go
- Warren Lee, pianist and featured artist of the Hong Kong Philharmonic Orchestra
- Janet Paschal, gospel music vocalist
- Damian Terriquez, actor
- Phil Tonken, actor
- Laura B. Whitmore, singer/songwriter and founder of the Women’s International Music Network
- Ed Wilson, president of Tribune Broadcasting and executive with Fox Television Network, NBC Enterprises, and CBS Enterprises

== Literature and journalism ==
- C. Dean Andersson, novelist
- José Luis Cordeiro, author, economist, futurist, and transhumanist
- Roscoe Drummond, political journalist, editor, and syndicated columnist, known for his association with The Christian Science Monitor
- Khushnood Nabizada, founder and owner of Khaama Press

== Law ==
- Vincent Ragosta, associate justice of the Rhode Island Superior Court

== Military ==
- Howard M. Fish, United States Air Force general
- Roger C. Poole, United States Army general
- Adam M. Robinson Jr., United States Navy vice admiral

== Politics and government ==
- Gordon R. England, United States Deputy Secretary of Defense and United States Secretary of the Navy
- Alan Greenspan, former chair of the Federal Reserve
- Deepender Singh Hooda, Member of Parliament (India)
- Foy D. Kohler, United States ambassador to the Soviet Union during the Cuban Missile Crisis
- James P. Moore Jr., Assistant Secretary of Commerce for Trade Development, U.S. Department of Commerce
- John E. Nixon, director of the Michigan Department of Technology, Management and Budget
- Alex Pettit, chief information officer for the State of Oregon and chief technology officer for the Colorado Governor's Office of Information Technology
- Phil Preis, mayor of Newellton, Louisiana, and the president of the Louisiana Municipal Association
- Roland Riese, member of the Lower Saxon Landtag
- Marie Royce, Assistant Secretary of State for Educational and Cultural Affairs
- Elmer B. Staats (1973), Comptroller General of the United States

== Science and medicine ==
- Story Musgrave, physician and a retired NASA astronaut
- Lindsay Rosenwald, doctor, biotechnology, life sciences industry investor
- Kenneth T. Wessner, health executive

== Sports ==
- Charley Bowser, head football coach at Grove City College, Bowdoin College, and he University of Pittsburgh
- Les Gutches, World Champion in freestyle wrestling and director of development for USA Wrestling
- Dick Larkins, athletic director at Ohio State University
- Eugene T. Lee, president of MBK Sports Management
- Gerek Meinhardt, 2016 Olympic medal-winning fencer
- Rick Moser, professional football player with the Pittsburgh Steelers, Miami Dolphins, Kansas City Chiefs, and Tampa Bay Buccaneers
- Obadele Thompson (1996), Olympic medal-winning sprinter
