= Rocky Dwyer =

Canadian business academic

Rocky J. Dwyer
- Board member of: Ontario Honours Advisory Council; Canadian Poultry Research Council; Catalyste+ Advisor; Indo Canada Education Council

Academic background
- Education: PhD, Capella University; Master of Science, Rochester Institute of Technology; BS, Bemidji State University

Academic work
- Institutions: University of Fredericton; Walden University

Rocky Dwyer is a Canadian scholar of business and finance. He is currently a professor at Walden University and the University of Fredericton.

== Early life and education ==
After graduating from high school, Dwyer was a remedial physical education instructor for Canadian military members who did not meet physical requirements. He received a Bachelor of Science degree from Bemidji State University and a Master of Science degree in Career and Human Resource Management from the Rochester Institute of Technology. He graduated from Capella University with a PhD in Organization and Management.

== Career ==
=== Public sector ===
Dwyer has held a number of public and private sector roles. He initially took a temporary 30-day job with Transport Canada before working with the Canadian government on a more permanent basis. While working with Transport Canada, he handled liaison support for families affected by the Arrow Air Flight 1285R crash in 1985.

He took a position with the Department of National Defence in 1987, serving as a civilian personnel officer and then a base personnel officer. He later served as director of human resources for Aboriginal Affairs and Northern Development Canada. He played a key role in the development of the original Yukon Aboriginal Employment Plan. He also was program principal at the Atlantic Canada Opportunities Agency and director of audit and evaluation at the Canada Firearms Centre. He later served as principal program evaluation and audit with chief review services at the Department of National Defence.

Dwyer is a member of the Ontario Honours Advisory Council and the board of directors of the Canadian Poultry Research Council. He is also on the boards of Catalyste+ and the Indo Canada Education Council.

=== Academic career ===
Dwyer was an adjunct professor at Athabasca University's Master of Business Administration program from 2001 until 2015. He has been a member of the College Management and Human Potential faculty at Walden University since 2010, and has been a professor at the University of Fredericton's Sandermoen School of Business since 2021. He was featured on the cover of CMA Magazine in 2010. His academic research has been published in five languages.

== Awards and recognition ==
He is a Fellow of the Royal Society of Arts, the Chartered Professional Accountants of Ontario, the Institute of Chartered Accountants of Ontario, and the Society of Management Accountants of Canada. In 2022, he received the Queen Elizabeth II Platinum Jubilee Medal, and in 2024 he received the King Charles III Coronation Medal.

He has received multiple Emerald Literati – Outstanding Reviewer Awards for his work with The International Journal of Health Governance and Management Research Review. He received an Excellence in Coaching Award from Athabasca University. He was awarded a Chancellor’s Commendation and a PVOT National Award from The Most Venerable Order of the Hospital of St. John of Jerusalem, Canada Priory. He is an honorary member of Delta Mu Delta. He has also received the Alan G. Ross Award for Writing Excellence, Capital Educators Award, Deputy Ministers Outstanding Achievement Award, Rita Turner Award and the Publons Multidisciplinary Peer Reviewer Award.

== Selected publications ==
- Patnaik, B.C.M.; Satpathy, Ipseeta; Dwyer, Rocky; Tyagi, Amit Kumar; Patnaik, Anish (2024-10-15), "Conceptual and Empirical Evidence for the Implementation of Blockchain Technology as a Solution for Healthcare Service Providers in India", Artificial Intelligence-Enabled Blockchain Technology and Digital Twin for Smart Hospitals, Wiley, pp. 179–200, doi:10.1002/9781394287420.ch9, ISBN 978-1-394-28739-0
- Pitke, Manish; Joshi, Vijay; Kumar Baral, Sukanta; Dwyer, Rocky J. (2023-06-05), "6 Retailing and e-commerce riding on technology: augmented reality and virtual reality", Augmented and Virtual Reality in Industry 5.0, De Gruyter, pp. 127–146, doi:10.1515/9783110790146-006, ISBN 978-3-11-079014-6

== Personal life ==
Dwyer resides in Orléans, Ontario.
