= Scott Rothbort =

- Rothbort in Seton Hall's Trading Room
- Born: 1961 (age 64–65); Brooklyn, New York
- Education: Stern, Wharton
- Occupations: investor, businessperson, and professor
- Known for: Investing
- Website: www.scottrothbort.blogspot.com

Scott Rothbort (born 1961 in Brooklyn, New York) is an American investor, businessperson, and professor.

== Investor ==
Often called "The Finance Professor", Rothbort is currently the president and manager of LakeView Asset Management, and has over 20 years of experience in the financial services industry. He is the founder and president of LakeView Asset Management, a registered investment advisor specializing in customized individually managed separate accounts, including proprietary long/short strategies to its high-net-worth clientele. While managing the equity swap business for Merrill Lynch, Rothbort developed marketed and transacted swap and financing based investment products primarily targeted to hedge funds and high-net-worth individuals. He was a key participant in Merrill's successful global effort in 1998–1999 to reduce exposure to hedge fund industry leverage and credit risks in response to the global credit and long-term capital management crises. Prior to working at Merrill Lynch, within the financial services industry, he worked for County Nat West Securities and Morgan Stanley, where he had international assignments in Tokyo, Hong Kong, and London.

== Seton Hall Professor ==
Rothbort was a professor of finance at Seton Hall University’s Stillman School of Business, where he was also the chief market strategist for the Stillman School of Business, co-supervisor of the Center for Securities Trading and Analysis, and former adviser to the student financial newspaper, The Stillman Exchange. He was associated with the university from 2002 to 2019.

== Contributor ==
Rothbort has been a contributor to MarketWatch's Trading Deck, TheStreet.com’s Real Money and Seeking Alpha websites and appears as a professional guest on Bloomberg Radio, Bloomberg Television, Fox Business Network, CNBC Television, TheStreet.com TV and the Forbes.com video network. In addition, he is widely quoted in interviews in the printed press and on the internet.

== Personal ==
Rothbort received an M.B.A., majoring in finance and international business from the Stern School of Business, New York University, in 1992, and a B.S. in economics, majoring in accounting, from the Wharton School of Business, University of Pennsylvania, in 1982. Rothbort is married and has five children. He is active in many charitable activities including Morry's Camp.
