= Public value =

Value of an act that contributes to society

Public value describes the value that an organization or activity contributes to society. The term was originally coined by Harvard professor Mark H. Moore who saw it as the equivalent of shareholder value in public management. Public value is supposed to provide managers with a notion of how entrepreneurial activity can contribute to the common good. Nowadays, public value is no longer limited to the public sector, but is used by all types of organization, including non-governmental organizations and private sector firms. Therefore, the public value researcher Timo Meynhardt from the University of St. Gallen and HHL Leipzig Graduate School of Management uses the term to generally raise the question about organizations' contribution to the common good. He believes that current management concepts, such as shareholder value, stakeholder value, customer value, sustainability or corporate social responsibility, should legitimize themselves in regard to their impact on the common good. In his (social-)psychological-based concept, public value emerges for individuals from the experiences made in social structures and relationships. Hence, it can be seen as a prerequisite and a resource for successful living.

== Definitions ==
Public value is value for the public. It equates managerial success in the public sector with initiating and reshaping public sector enterprises in ways that increase their value to the public in both the short and the long run. Moore, 1995 According to a recent systematic review of empirical public value research, public value has four key dimensions: outcome achievement (i.e. the extent to which a public body is improving publicly valued outcomes across a wide variety of areas), trust and legitimacy (i.e. the extent to which an organisation and its activities are trusted and perceived to be legitimate by the public and by key stakeholders), service delivery quality (i.e the extent to which services are experienced as being delivered in high‐quality manner that is considerate of users' needs), and efficiency (i.e. the extent to which an organisation is achieving maximal benefits with minimal resources).

Public values are those providing normative consensus about (1) the rights, benefits, and prerogatives to which citizens should (and should not) be entitled; (2) the obligations of citizens to society, the state and one another; and (3) the principles on which governments and policies should be based. Public Value is the combined view of the public about what they regard as valuable. Talbot, 2006. Value for the public is therefore situated in relationships between the individual and society, founded in individuals, constituted by subjective evaluations against basic needs, activated by and realized in emotional-motivational states, and produced and reproduced in experience-intense practices. Meynhardt, 2009

== In the public sector ==
The research program on public value was kicked off by Professor Mark H. Moore of Harvard's Kennedy School of Government, who published a book on the subject, Creating Public Value. Strategic Management in Government, in 1995. In this sense, public value can be instituted as an organising principle in a public sector organisation, providing a focus in the context of which individual employees are free to pursue and propose new ideas about how to improve the working of the organisation, in terms of efficiency or services. Public organisations seeking to use public value as a principle need to create a corporate culture in which the pursuit of public values by employees is rewarded just as pursuing shareholder value is rewarded in private corporations.

The concept has been taken up initially by academics, think tanks and NGOs, and later by a number of public sector organisations in the United Kingdom and other countries.

In 2004 it was used by the BBC as the cornerstone of its manifesto for the renewal of its charter.

In 2006 Accenture launched the Institute for Public Service Value (IPSV), to explore how public value is created in government organizations. Greg Parston, co-founder and former Chief Executive of the Office for Public Management, and a collaborator with Professor Moore, was appointed Director. Among many other studies, IPSV conducted the Global Cities Forum in 2007-2009, which facilitated citizens' deliberations on their experiences and expectations of public value in 17 cities around the world.

In 2006, the Center for Technology in Government (CTG) in partnership with SAP AG, conducted research on the topic of public value in the context of governments' investments in information technology (IT). The results of this research found that governments' ability to realize the full value of IT investments is not completely measurable in terms of financial results. More specifically, the five U.S. and international governments studied, looked for the full value of government IT investments in both the internal value to government operations and the broader political and social returns to the public at large.

From this point of view, there are two sources of public value:

1. value that results from improving the government itself as an asset to society and
2. value that results from the delivery of specific benefits directly to persons or groups.

In November 2006, UK-based The Work Foundation published a report on their project, titled Deliberative democracy and the role of public managers, followed in October 2008 by Public Value: The Next Steps in Public Service Reform

The German Federal Employment Agency uses the public value concept to better understand its contribution to society that goes beyond simple task fulfillment and make it a yardstick for management decisions. An empirical study has shown that a particular value of this organization is seen in its contribution to social peace in Germany.

== In the private sector ==
Public value is also taken up by private sector companies that want to maintain a license to operate and understand what implications new strategies and projects might have in terms of public value creation/ destruction. Such analyses can be done using a Public Value Scorecard as proposed by Timo Meynhardt and Peter Gomez. Public value acknowledges that established business paradigms such as customer value or stakeholder value risk overemphasizing certain aspects of business' value contribution to society at the expense of other important dimensions. It pledges for a redefinition of the entire notion of value creation as it takes utilitarian and hedonistic as well as political and moral aspects of value creation into account.

A number of firms use public value to obtain management information helping to take strategic decisions. Examples include:

- Fresenius Medical Care, a German producer of medical supplies and operator of dialysis clinics, complements its balanced scorecard with the Public Value Scorecard. Through the inclusion of an external perspective the firm wants to gain a better understanding of the public value of healthcare service that are supplied by private firms. In a first project, the firm has systematically measured the public value of its dialysis centers in Great Britain. The management wants to use the insights gained in this study for positioning towards the firms' stakeholders.
- The football club FC Bayern Munich uses a public value approach to systematically assess the challenges pertaining to its societal role that come along with its growth from a regionally embedded football club to a global entertainment brand. For a football club that enjoys permanent public attention and is seen as a role model by many people, such questions are especially relevant. Different public values such as "Mia san mia" (Bavarian for "us is us") and "global brand image" are partly in tension with each other. The structured compilation of the club's societal value can be used as management information for strategic decision-making.

== The Strategic Triangle ==
When further developing his thinking on public value, Moore focused his book Recognizing Public Value (2013) on how to assist public managers to focus on creating public value within the environment they work within, rather than as a theoretical framework. Moore created the strategic triangle as an analytical framework to help turn abstract possibilities into the concrete circumstances managers are facing. The strategic triangle is used by many public managers across the world, to understand and measure the public value they create and what kind of capability and capacity is required to create it.

The framework asks three critical questions about the outcome being sought:

1. Does it create public value?
2. Is there legitimacy and support for the conception of public value?
3. Is there operational capacity to get it done?

These three questions create the points of the strategic triangle. The challenge for public managers is to ensure that all three of these points are in alignment and mutually reinforcing.

=== Public Value ===
Within the strategic triangle public value is also referred to as the ‘task environment’. This is because when a public manager assesses what social conditions can be improved by the government, they must look at individuals needs and the valued social conditions they live within. When government assets are used to change that task environment, public value is created.

=== Legitimacy and Support ===
A key determining factor on whether a public manager is able to achieve public value is the amount of legitimacy and support they can generate within their authorising environment. This authorising environment is made up of all the people who can call the organisation to account, to evaluate its performance and value, and has control over the resources it needs to deliver. The authorising environment often includes individual citizens (i.e. voters and taxpayers), advocates (e.g. unions), the press, government agencies and non-governmental watchdog agencies.

=== Operational Capacity ===
Operational capacity refers to whether the public manager has enough people and time to use government assets along a value chain to create the desired outcomes. The value chain can be described as the ability to create the desired outcome through the flow of inputs to outputs. The key characteristics of the value chain lie in how inputs flow through to outputs. These include the activities, processes, procedures, and programs of an organisation. What nearly all public managers will face is low operational capacity to be able to deliver, so it is often only possible to achieve the outcome through partnership with other co-producers.

=== The Strategic Triangle as an Analytical Framework ===
The strategic triangle can also be used as an analytical framework to assess empirical materials in research. In a study by Höglund et al. (2021) of the Swedish public sector it was used to analyse the strategic management and management control practices at Region Stockholm and in particular, the Culture Unit. It is challenging to find alignment among the three points of the strategic triangle when it comes to strategic management and public value creation. Therefore, the study attempted to answer the question “How do management control practices enable and/or constrain strategic alignment”.

The study was conducted through 34 interviews with 31 people between June 2017 and November 2019. A range of documents were also collected as a part of the data collection. The researchers result findings were presented under three propositions.

The first was that “strategic alignment is vulnerable to management control practices that have a strong focus on performance measurements”. As the approach to creating public value was focused on using visionary objectives, performance measures and report systems, the results were that the focus on performance measurements created a misalignment among the three points in the strategic triangle.

The second was that “strategic alignment is vulnerable to standardized management control practices”. The study found that through standardising management control practices, there was a misalignment between the authorising environment and operational capacity, as it increased the administrative burden.

The final was that “strategic alignment is vulnerable to politically driven management control practices”. It was shown through the study that the interaction with politicians meant there was a greater focus on short-term goals and measurable outputs and that there were issues with political micromanagement. This resulted in a lack of operational capacity and misalignment with the point of public value creation in the strategic triangle.

The strength of the strategic triangle as an analytical framework is that it recognises the specifics and contextual issues of the public sector.

== Measurement and Evaluation ==
Measuring public value has become increasingly important in efficient public administration. Although there has been a great deal of research dedicated to establishing public value, there has been relatively little focus on how to measure it. Evaluating and measuring results assists the understanding and application of public value principles.

=== Why Is Public Value Measured? ===
Public managers can utilise this information for ten various tasks to: (1) address accountability demands from elected officials and the public; (2) submit budget requests; (3) conduct internal budgeting; (4) initiate detailed analyses of performance issues and potential solutions; (5) inspire; (6) negotiate contracts; (7) assess; (8) assist in strategic planning; (9) enhance communication with the public to foster trust; and (10) improve. The primary purpose of performance measurement is to improve the efficiency and effectiveness of public service, thereby supplying information to public officials.

Public managers can utilize performance measurement for: (1) evaluating; (2) controlling; (3) budgeting; (4) motivating; (5) promoting; (6) celebrating; (7) learning; and (8) improving. Leaders of public agencies should first determine the managerial purposes for which performance measurement will be used, and then select a set of performance measures that can effectively support these purposes both directly and indirectly.

=== What Should Be Measured? ===
Public value measurement focuses on outcomes and impacts rather than just inputs and outputs. This includes: (1) achievement of desired societal outcomes; (2) citizen satisfaction; (3) trust in institutions; and (4) intangible elements contributing to public welfare.

The value chain model proposes evaluating public value at various points: inputs, programs, procedures, processes, activities, outputs, and outcomes. Some researchers suggest expanding assessment to consider the influence of policies and programs on various activities. This implies that every activity related to creating public value must be evaluated.

=== How Is Public Value Measured? ===
The two distinct methods suggested by Moore for evaluating public value: (1) The programme evaluation/cost-benefit approach and (2) the business management approach. The first approach using traditional program evaluation techniques focuses on economics and welfare economics to quantify the advantages and drawbacks of public programs or policies.

Willingness-to-Pay (WTP), Willingness-to-Accept (WTA), and Travel Cost Methods are numerical models that aim to quantify the monetary worth that individuals assign to public goods and services. Nonetheless, these strategies are known for being undependable due to their susceptibility to intangible factors like equity and public confidence. According to Moore, the second business management approach is considered more practical compared to the initial approach. It utilises conventional performance measurement systems (PMS) that continue to be valid if they are interpreted to create a measurement that is more in tune with the public value concept.

=== Challenges of Measuring Public Value ===
Nevertheless, there are various challenges when it comes to measuring public value. One significant problem is the "delivery paradox" (Spano, 2014, p. 4), where improvements in quantitative measurement metrics may not correspond with how citizens perceive service quality. This emphasises the drawbacks of depending only on statistical objectives. Another difficulty lies in acquiring intangible elements of public value, like equity, confidence, and citizen involvement, which are important for public sector performance despite being complicated to measure.

=== Criticisms and Challenges of Public Value ===
An influential framework within public management theory, the concept has also been criticized on a number of grounds for the implications it holds for democracy, lack of conceptual clarity and its utility in practice.

Ambiguity in Definition

It presents opportunities to criticize the theory of public value for inexactitude. But it is hard to define what public value might actually mean: objectives could easily include anything from satisfaction of community needs to making people happy. To the opponents, this vagueness would create illusion of what public management is about that make it infeasible to make or judge value. Public value is a notoriously nebulous concept (although Moore, 1995 provides an encompassing definition as the result of socially beneficent government actions).

This means that it is unclear which values are being prioritized. This potential is particularly problematic because public managers and officials might define value differently than citizens, which may help drive a divergence between the priorities of government and the expectations of the people. Rhodes and Wanna argue that this leads to a paternalistic style in which decision-makers believe they know what is best for the people without adequate input (2007, p.

Another significant problem is measuring public value. While private sector value is often measured through financial numbers, public value includes those intangible elements — like trust, equity and social wellbeing — that are difficult to quantify. For example, quantifiably measuring societal benefit is tough when it comes to metrics like citizen satisfaction or trust in government. Kelly et al. Existing evaluation tools are unable to measure long-term or morally significant outcomes such as social justice or environmental sustainability.

Accountability is further complicated by the fact that when the measures are not reliable, public officials responsible for the program or intervention need tojustify their decisionsand demonstrate whether or not they have led to benefits (most likely in cases where there is only a “somewhat good” measure ), and be scrutinized even further. Moreover, the demand for immediate results can also result in relying too heavily on easily measurable yet insufficient metrics, which may come at the expense of the larger public value creation.

Democratic Accountability

Another criticism revolves around the potential dispute with democratic accountability. Public value theory's focus on managerial discretion could elevate the positions of public officials over those of participation in direct democracy. Rhodes and Wanna (2009) make the point that this is a top-down tendency which has implications for corporatist forms of governance as it places managerial expertise above elected representatives and public opinion thus risking de-differentiation in weakening the voice of citizens within policymaking. Public managers might utilize discretion to create public value, without necessarily adhering to welfare-maximising preferences (Bouckaert & Halligan 2008).

This establishes a particular kind of post, position and authority for the purpose of maintaining the managerial/democratic tension. If value is judged by public officials, for example, there is a danger that the choices they make will not reflect the preferences of the people. Critics warn this may leave decision-making in the hands of unelected technocrats and diminish democratic debate around policy.

Practical Implementation

Unlocking public value in government institutions are difficult to operationalize Public value theory combines efficiency, legitimacy and service delivery. The hardest part of aligning these goals in practice is that political priorities can be at odds with one another, resources are scarce and implementation bottlenecks exist everywhere. Public managers frequently wrestle with balancing the acute present with the important but indistinct future, especially when resources are tight.

Further, many of the hurdles that co-production of public value — a core element of the theory — must clear are practical. Engaging citizens and stakeholders in decision-making processes are difficult, as power imbalances, trust deficits, and varied interests between the different actors make reaching solutions challenging. Alford and O’Flynn (2009) note that while coproduction holds out promise of better inclusion, it is often problematic in practice, especially when the government institutions are unwilling to change or unable to execute collaboration effectively.

Conclusion

Although capable of enhancing public service delivery, public value theory is not without its potential shortcomings; these include conceptual ambiguity, measurement challenges, a critique with respect to democratic accountability and practical operationalization. While responding to these critiques will take time for the intellectual foundations of the theory to be improved, more high-quality measurement instruments need to be available, and retains bring democratic participation into places surrounding creation public value Otherwise the theory itself risks overpromising on how much it can contribute to a better functioning public sector.

== Future Directions ==
There are two main directions of where public value research is heading. First, scholars are within the public domain, aiming to enhance the concept through improved definitions, deeper propositional theories, and efficient practical objectives. This involves separating public value into measurable parts, analysing its different aspects thoroughly, and investigating its interpretation and implementation in diverse settings.

Secondly, it entails placing public value within the wider scope of public administration and beyond. This includes continued discussions on its strength as a concept, justifications for its role as a comprehensive idea, and attempts to broaden or modify the theory. Some researchers combine public value with other concepts or investigate its use in various sectors.

== Demarcation from related concepts ==
- Public services – a term usually used to mean services provided by government to its citizens
- Public good – a good whose availability is not reduced (non-rival) due to consumption by others, and which no one can be effectively excluded (non-excludable) from using.
