= Andreas Suchanek =

German economist

- Born: August 12, 1961 (age 64); Stadthagen, Germany
- Education: Kiel University; University of Göttingen; Witten/Herdecke University (D.Sc., 1993); Catholic University of Eichstätt-Ingolstadt (Ph.D., 1999)
- Occupations: economy and business ethicist, Dr. Werner Jackstädt-chair for economy and business ethics

Andreas Suchanek (born August 12, 1961, in Stadthagen, Germany) is a German economy and business ethicist and one of the best-known students of Karl Homann, an expert in business ethics.

He is an economist as well as an expert in business and economy ethics. As academic disciple of Karl Homann he contributed substantially to Homanns teaching regarding the approach of institutional economics toward business ethics, which not only plays an important part at Universities and international business schools but also in the economy, politics and the society.

== Life ==
Andreas Suchanek studied political economy at Kiel University and the University of Göttingen before he graduated as doctor of political science summa cum laude from the private Witten/Herdecke University in 1993. In 1999, he was habilitated at the Catholic University of Eichstätt-Ingolstadt due to his work on normative environmental economics. Subsequently, in 1999, he was appointed as Karl Homanns successor and took over the substitution of the chair for economy and business ethics at the university's science faculty. Homann left to serve as chair for philosophy and economy at LMU Munich. In 2004, Suchanek joined the HHL Leipzig Graduate School of Management (former Handelshochschule Leipzig). Since that time, he holds the Dr. Werner Jackstädt-chair for economy and business ethics.

In addition to this, since 2005, Suchanek is as member of the Wittenberg-Center for Global Ethics (Wittenberg-Zentrums für Globale Ethik) board of directors which specializes on the topics "Building Global Cooperation" and corporate social responsibility as globalization, world economy and global competition are supposed to be shaped for the benefit of all people. According to the center, this requires general principles which make peace, justice and prosperity possible in the consolidating world society. Since 2013 Suchanek is the center's chairman and vice chairman of the executive board of the foundation. The foundation was founded by former US ambassador Andrew Young and Hans-Dietrich Genscher, former German minister of foreign affairs. The idea for founding the center was inspired by Hans-Dietrich Genscher's guiding principle “winners vs. losers – that's not how the new world order should be. Everybody should have their share of the winning side. In affirming the interests of others lies a chance for oneself”. As academic leader Andreas Suchanek is responsible to develop the theoretical groundwork of the Wittenberg-Center with the aim for the guiding principle to increasingly take root in the society. A number of well-known businesses and organizations as well as important personalities from the spheres of politics, economy, church, culture and science support the Wittenberg-Center's work.

As an expert in questions of corporate social responsibility Suchanek advises global businesses from various economic branches.

== Theory ==
Suchanek's studies focus on economy and business ethics, sustainability, trust and credibility management as well as interaction ethics. By using decision and game theory methods, which view the question of competition and cooperation not as contradiction but as chance to win cooperation, Suchanek developed the economically reformed Golden Rule: invest in the conditions of social collaboration for mutual advantage.

Being a member of the core team of HHL - Leipzig Graduate School of Management, he developed the Leipzig Leadership Model, which was published in 2016, along with Manfred Kirchgeorg, Timo Meynhardt, Andreas Pinkwart and Henning Zülch.

== Memberships ==
- Chairman of the Wittenberg-Center for Global Ethic Foundation
- Member of the task group for economy ethics and economy culture of the German Society for Philosophy (Deutschen Gesellschaft für Philosophie)
- Member of the German Network for Economy Ethics (Deutschen Netzwerk Wirtschaftsethik (DNWE))
- Member of the Social Policy Association (Verein für Socialpolitik)
- Member of the board of trustees of the CSSA (Chemie-Sozialpartner Akademie)
- Member of advisory board of the Berlin Demographic Forum (Berliner Demographie Forum)

== Publications ==
- Ökonomischer Ansatz und theoretische Integration. Mohr Siebeck Verlag, Tübingen 1994, ISBN 3-16-146205-X.
- with Karl Homann: Ökonomik. Eine Einführung. 2. Auflage. Mohr Siebeck Verlag, Tübingen 2005, ISBN 3-16-146516-4.
- Normative Umweltökonomik. Zur Herleitung von Prinzipien rationaler Umweltpolitik. Mohr Siebeck Verlag, Tübingen 2000, ISBN 3-16-147284-5.
- Ökonomische Ethik. 2. Auflage. Mohr Siebeck Verlag, Tübingen 2007, ISBN 978-3-8252-2195-9.
- Unternehmensethik. In Vertrauen investieren. Mohr Siebeck Verlag, Tübingen 2015, ISBN 978-3-16-153165-1.

== Other publications ==
- Ethik in der Wirtschaft. In: Arbeit und Arbeitsrecht: AuA, 69 (2014) 5, 257.
- Diskussionspapiere Wittenberg-Zentrum für Globale Ethik
