= Devonshire Initiative =

The Devonshire Initiative (DI) is a Canadian forum for leading international development NGOs and mining companies to come together in response to the emerging social agenda surrounding mining and community development issues. The DI was founded on the belief that the Canadian mining and NGO presence in emerging markets can be a force for positive change. The group came into being on March 5, 2007 at an initial workshop conducted at the University of Toronto on cross-sector partnerships, which featured a case study of the Kimberley Process on Conflict Diamonds.

== Activities ==
The DI has held over a dozen formal workshops and incubated one on-the-ground pilot in Honduras.

The ultimate objective of the Devonshire Initiative (DI) is improved social and community development outcomes wherever Canadian mining companies operate overseas. One avenue to that goal is through deeper collaboration with on-the-ground, development NGOs, leveraging the many decades of experience these organizations have in developing countries. However, the sectors have traditionally operated independently, both at head office and in-country, and there are very few points of contact currently in existence between them. The result is that companies are unable to harness the expertise of NGOs in development; and NGOs miss the opportunity to steer private sector development in a more socially sensitive and equitable way. In Canada, there is currently no iterative, long-term venue to build relationships, trust and partnerships between these two groups. The Devonshire Initiative (DI) is intended to begin to fill that gap.

The DI sees industry/NGO collaboration as a means to an end, with four specific areas of value added for the DI:

1. Enhancing in-country capacity to allow communities, regions and countries to more visibly realize the benefits of Canadian mining investments;
2. Providing concrete examples of operationalizing the industry’s CSR initiatives and policies, in order to enhance positive impact of the industry;
3. Enhancing Canadian engagement with, and understanding of, the issues of international development. This domestic engagement includes policymakers as well as the general public; and,
4. Improved ability to influence corporate practices and leverage strategic partnerships for policy influence and advocacy.

== Work plan ==
The Devonshire Initiative's work is proceeding along two mutually reinforcing tracks: first, systematically identifying and working to minimize the structural obstacles to international development NGO/mining industry collaboration. These include, for instance, risk, resource imbalance and a lack of understanding of each other’s "business." The second track proceeds to the substantive work of testing the underlying hypothesis of the Devonshire Initiative: that collaborative problem solving will yield significantly better results on the ground in developing countries.

Longer term the DI's objective will be to use a collective, credible voice to influence Canadian and global policy and practice on international development. There are opportunities in the policy arena to harness the DI’s influence on Canadian and global funding decisions, development priorities, and CSR initiatives.

The work plan from 2010 forward focuses on five activity areas:

1. Networking and Capacity building - Events are aimed at enhancing the relationships, trust building and sharing best practices that are necessary for effective collaboration;
2. Communications – Improving internal and external communications among the membership and to relevant audiences;
3. Knowledge Sharing and Dissemination. The DI is positioning itself as a platform to disseminate information about existing case studies, initiatives, research projects, etc.;
4. Joint projects, innovation and knowledge creation. Over next 12 months, the DI will provide feedback and input on a pending World Vision proposal to CIDA aimed at improved cross-sector collaboration between NGOs and the industry to reduce potential for conflict, enhance community and local authority capacity for sustainable, long-term development; and,
5. Policy engagement and public engagement, with a variety of external stakeholders, including government, industry players, other NGOs, Canadian publics.

== Structure ==
The DI is headed by a part-time director, funded from annual financial commitments made by the industry participants. The director reports to a steering committee made up of 6 members: 3 from the NGO members and 3 from industry members.

The DI was initially organized by Marketa Evans, who served as the founding director until the fall of 2009. Subsequent directors were Alanna Rondi (October 2009-April 2010; June 2011-Oct 2012; January 2014 – present) and Edward Thomas (interim coordinator; April 2010-March 2011; October 2012–December 2013).

== Member organizations ==
The Devonshire Initiative counts a number of NGOs, mining companies, and associations as members:

- Plan Canada
- World Vision Canada
- Save the Children Canada
- Engineers Without Borders Canada
- CARE Canada
- AMREF Canada
- TechnoServe
- Search for Common Ground
- World University Service of Canada
- Pact
- Barrick Gold
- Iamgold
- Inmet Mining Corporation
- Canadian Executive Service Organization
- Goldcorp
- Prospectors and Developers Association of Canada (PDAC)
- Mining Association of Canada
- Rio Tinto Alcan
- SOPAR
