= General Fish =

General Fish may refer to:

- Erland F. Fish (1883–1942), Massachusetts National Guard commanding general
- Howard M. Fish (1923–2020), U.S. Air Force lieutenant general
- Irving Fish (1881–1948), U.S. Army major general
