= Orin Smith =

Orin Smith may refer to:

- Orin C. Smith (1942–2018), president and chief executive officer of Starbucks Corporation
- Orin R. Smith, chairman and chief executive officer of the Engelhard Corporation
