= Morris C. Troper =

American lawyer

Morris Carlton Troper (November 18, 1892 – November 17, 1962) was a Jewish-American accountant from New York City credited for saving hundreds of Jewish refugees during World War II.

== Life ==
Troper was born on November 18, 1892, in Brooklyn, New York, the son of Abraham Troper and Rose Schaeffer.

Troper attended the College of the City of New York, graduating from there with an A.B. in 1914. He then went to New York University, graduating from there with a B.C.S. 1917, an M.C.L. in 1918, and a J.D. in 1925. He taught in New York City public schools from 1914 to 1918, and in 1920 he was an accountancy instructor at the College of the City of New York. In 1919, he became a member of the certified public accountants firm Loeb and Troper. He was admitted to the bar in 1925. In 1936, he was elected director of the New York State Society of Certified Public Accountants. He also served as its president until he went abroad in 1938. In 1933, the Board of Regents of the University of the State of New York appointed him to the Committee of Grievances for C.P.A. He became the committee's chairman in 1936.

Troper was active in Jewish refugee affairs for nearly forty years. In 1920, he travelled to Poland and Hungary on behalf of the Joint Distribution Committee (JDC). He visited the Soviet Union in 1929 and 1936 to study efforts by Soviet Jews to establish autonomous colonies. He first visited Germany on behalf of the JDC in 1933. He was national comptroller of the Allied Jewish Campaign in 1930 and of the United Jewish Appeal from 1934 to 1935, and in 1936 he was executive vice-chairman of the Greater New York Campaign of the JDC. In 1938, he was appointed chairman of the European Executive Council of the JDC and went to Europe to reorganize their European activities. He visited nearly every major European capital while serving in that position, including Berlin during Kristallnacht and Rome the day before Italy entered World War II.

Shortly before World War II, Troper and Paul Baerwald of the JDC negotiated with the Netherlands, France, Great Britain, and Belgium to accept the 907 passengers who were aboard the MS St. Louis who had been refused permission to disembark at Cuba. For his service with the St. Louis, he was named an Officer of the French Legion of Honour, the last civilian to receive the decoration before World War II. In the 1976 film Voyage of the Damned about the St. Louis, he was portrayed by Ben Gazzara.

He was in Paris, the JDC's European headquarters, until the day before the Nazis entered the city. From there, he made his way through southern France and opened a new JDC headquarters in Lisbon. During his three and a half years as the JDC's European chairman, he supervised the administration of over twenty million dollars expended by the JDC, conferred with Jewish leaders from virtually every community, consolidated and strengthened local communal organizations, and maintained contact with foreign government officials and intergovernmental agencies. He occasionally returned to America to consult with JDC officials and make coast-to-coast tours to campaign for the United Jewish Appeals and tell people his first-hand accounts of what was going on in Europe. He resigned as chairman of the JDC European executive council in April 1942.

In 1942, Troper returned to the United States and entered the United States Army as a colonel in the Office of Fiscal Director and Chief of Finance. In 1948, he became a brigadier general in the Finance Reserve Corps. He received the Legion of Merit for his military service and was cited for contributing to the successful development of the fiscal policy of the Army and War Departments. He also had the State Conspicuous Service Cross.

Troper was a national council member of the United HIAS Service, a director of the American ORT Federation, and a member of the American Institute of Accountants, the National Association of Cost Accountants, and the American Institute of the Legion of Honor. He was treasurer of the Central Synagogue. He was also a member of the Accountants Committee of Federation for Support of Jewish Philanthropic Societies, and Delta Mu Delta.

In 1919, he married Ethel Dorothy Gartner. They had two children, Betty Elsie and John Gartner.

Troper died in the Beth Abraham Home in the Bronx on November 17, 1962, a day before his seventieth birthday. His funeral took place in the Central Synagogue. He was buried in Mount Lebanon Cemetery.
