= Delta Mu Delta =

International business administration honor society

- ΔΜΔ
- Founded: January 16, 1914; 112 years ago New York University
- Type: Honor
- Affiliation: ACHS
- Status: Active
- Emphasis: Business Administration
- Scope: International
- Motto: Dia Mathessos, Dynamis "Through Knowledge, Power"
- Colors: Purple, Gold, and White
- Publication: The Vision
- Chapters: 204 active
- Members: 150,000+ active 246,000+ lifetime
- Headquarters: 3730 Grand Boulevard; Brookfield, Illinois 60513; United States
- Website: www.deltamudelta.org

Delta Mu Delta (ΔΜΔ) is an international honor society that recognizes academic excellence in baccalaureate, master's, and doctorate business administration programs. Its chapters are only located at institutions that are accredited by the Association of Collegiate Business Schools and Programs. It is a member of the Association of College Honor Societies.

== History ==
Delta Mu Delta was founded at New York University on January 16, 1914, by a dean Joseph French Johnson and professors George Burton Hotchkiss, Charles W. Gertstengerg, Edward J. Kilderf, and John R. Weldmon from the university's School of Commerce, Accounts and Finance. The purpose of the Delta Mu Delta honor society is to promote higher education in business administration by recognizing and rewarding academic accomplishments.

To better serve the goals of the society, Delta Mu Delta established a national council and applied for a national charter in 1951. Its national council consists of its national officers and the faculty moderator for each chapter. The officers include the president, vice president, and secretary.

Delta Mu Delta was incorporated in Pennsylvania on August 12, 1962. By 1962, the society has nine chapters and 1,640 initiates. Delta Mu Delta became a member of the Association of College Honor Societies in 1963. In January 1992, the society signed an exclusive agreement with the Association of Collegiate Business Schools and Programs stating that all future chapters of Delta Mu Delta must be established at ACBSP-accredited colleges and universities. Many former chapters withdrew and became Beta Gamma Sigma chapters when their host institutions have achieved AACSB accreditation.

Delta Mu Delta chartered its first international chapter in 2008. In 2009, the society had 203 active chapters and 150,000 members. In 2024, it has more than 246,000 members across more than 290 chapters. Its national headquarters is at 3730 Grand Boulevard in Brookfield, Illinois.

== Symbols ==
The name Delta Mu Delta was selected as a monogram for the society's motto Dia Mathessos, Dynamis or "Through Knowledge, Power".

The society's badge is a gold key in the form of the triangular Greek letter Delta. On one side of the key is a ship with full-blown sails with the Greek letters ΔΜΔ below it; the ship symbolizes the business activity.

The society's colors are purple, gold, and white. Its publication is The Vision.

== Chapters ==
As of 2024, Delta Mu Delta has 204 active chapters. It has chartered more than 290 chapters.

== Notable members ==
- John R. Brazil, president of Trinity University and Southeastern Massachusetts University
- Rocky Dwyer, Canadian business professor
- Seby B. Jones, mayor of Raleigh, North Carolina
- Thomas F. Olin, chairman of Archway Cookies
- Jeanine Rhea, professor emeritus in the Department of Management at Oklahoma State University
- Malcolm Smith, New York State Senate and active Lieutenant Governor of New York
- Tammy Smith, retired major general of the United States Army Reserve.
- Aureta Thomollari, creative director, art collector, and luxury consultant
- Morris C. Troper, accountant credited for saving hundreds of Jewish refugees during World War II

== See also ==
- Honor cords
- Honor society
- Professional fraternities and sororities
