= The Stillman Exchange =

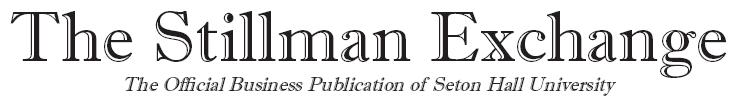
- Type: Biweekly student newspaper
- Format: Online
- Owner(s): Stillman School of Business, Seton Hall University
- Founder(s): Michael Cavallaro, Christopher LoSapio, Frank Aguiano
- Staff writers: 30+
- Founded: 2006
- Headquarters: Stillman School of Business, Seton Hall University
- Website: https://blogs.shu.edu/stillmanexchange/

The Stillman Exchange is a student newspaper of Seton Hall University in South Orange, New Jersey, United States. The paper, founded in 2006 by Michael Cavallaro, Christopher LoSapio, Frank Aguiano, and others, focuses on business issues and is distributed bi-weekly, with issues being distributed on Tuesdays during the academic term.

The publication began as an eight-page, black-and-white print edition distributed biweekly on Tuesdays during the academic term, produced out of the school's Center for Securities Trading and Analysis. An online edition launched in 2008. As of August 2024, The Stillman Exchange publishes exclusively online, releasing articles in biweekly cycles during the fall and spring semesters.

The mission of The Stillman Exchange is to educate Seton Hall students and its extended community on the impacts and interactions of current financial, domestic and international news events guided by the highest standards of integrity and professionalism. (Adopted Fall 2009)

== History ==
The Stillman Exchange was founded with students from the W. Paul Stillman School of Business felt a need that students at Seton Hall were not getting enough business news exposure. The paper printed its first edition on March 29, 2006 and has been printing bi-weekly ever since.

In September 2008, under the direction of Gerardo Pecoraro and Magdalena Dewane, the newspaper added 3 new sections, International Business, Domestic News and Editorials.

In October 2009, after a year's worth of preparation, Managing Editor, Gerardo Pecoraro and exchange students from the University of Business and Economics (U.I.B.E.)in Beijing, China, published the nation's first college bilingual business newspaper. The Special Edition is distributed in the U.S. at Seton Hall University and in China at the U.I.B.E..

In 2025, The Stillman Exchange added a Financial Literacy section, aimed at helping students build practical knowledge of personal finance topics such as budgeting, credit, and investing.

In 2026, a Real Estate section was added in collaboration with the Seton Hall Real Estate organization to further students’ growing interest in real estate and give them a window into the industry.

== Sections ==
The paper is divided into several sections

- U.S. News / International News
- Stillman News
- Finance
- Marketing
- Sports
- Technology
- Opinion
- Financial Literacy
- Real Estate

== Bilingual Chinese/English Special Edition ==
On Wednesday, October 21, 2009, The Stillman Exchange released its first abridged four-page special edition written in both English and Chinese. The articles are written by exchange students enrolled in the "1+2" UIBE-SHU MBA program.

== Staff ==
The staff are all undergraduate students enrolled at Seton Hall University. The staff represents a full spectrum of business majors from the Stillman School of Business, as well as students from the School of Diplomacy, and the College of Arts & Sciences.

== Contact ==
Website https://blogs.shu.edu/stillmanexchange/

Instagram https://www.instagram.com/thestillmanexchange/
