= Manfred Kirchgeorg =

German economist

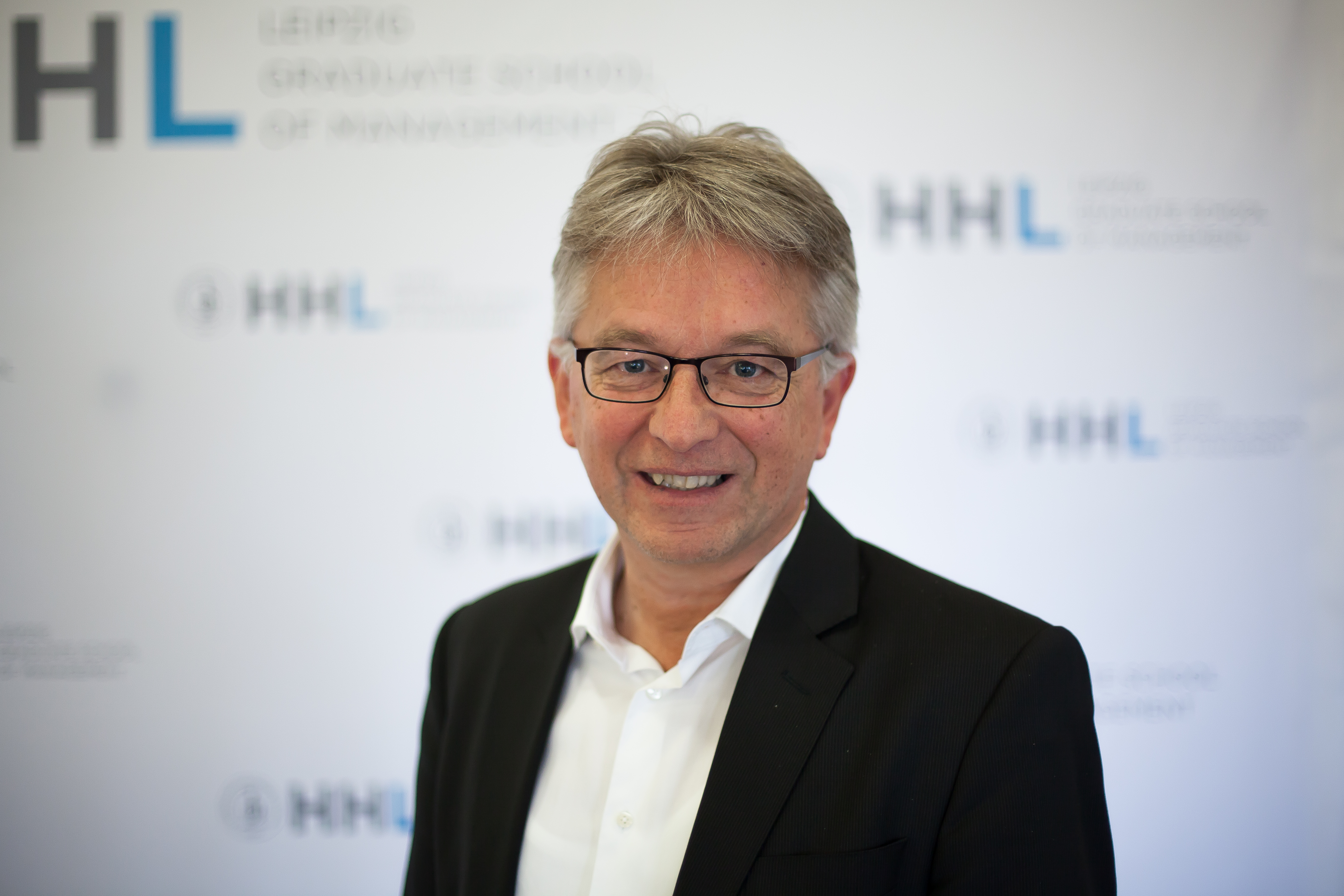
Manfred Kirchgeorg

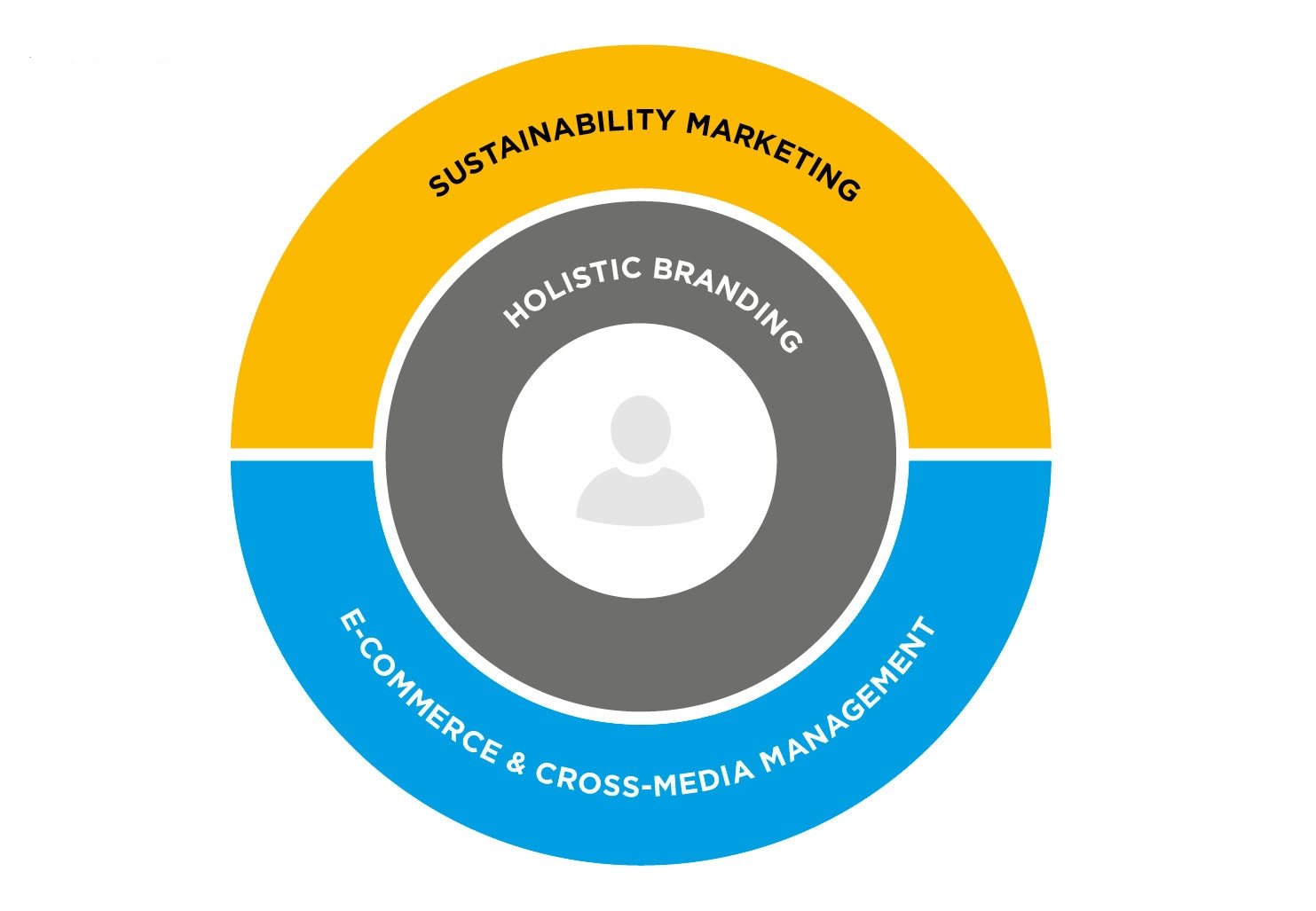
Research fields of the SVI-Endowed Chair of Marketing at HHL

Manfred Kirchgeorg (born 1958) is a German economist, specialized in the field of marketing management, who holds the SVI-Endowed Chair of Marketing, especially E-Commerce and Cross-Media Management at HHL Leipzig Graduate School of Management.

== Academic career ==
Kirchgeorg finished his PhD and habilitation in business studies at the University of Münster.

Since 1998, Kirchgeorg has held the Chair of Marketing Management at HHL Leipzig. In 2013, his chair received an endowment by the Deutsche Post AG, and it now has the title "Deutsche Post Chair of Marketing, especially E-Commerce and Cross-Media Management".

His research projects are organized in three competence centers which cover the areas of Holistic Branding, Sustainability Marketing, Cross-Media Management and E-Commerce. He is a member of numerous associations, including the German Academic Association for Business Research, the American Marketing Association, the Academy of Management, the Beta Gamma Sigma Chapter of AACSB, and the Schmalenbach-Gesellschaft für Betriebswirtschaftslehre e.V. Moreover, Kirchgeorg is a founding member of the Automotive Cluster of East Germany (ACOD). He is in the board of the Academic Society for Marketing and Business Leadership as well as the Academic Marketing Association and is a member of the global network Microeconomics of Competitiveness (MoC) at Harvard Business School. In December 2017 was appointed new head of the MoC Curriculum Council. In addition, he sits on the supervisory board of the Unilever Germany Holding GmbH and the GfK Verein.

In the Masters in Management Ranking 2014 conducted by the Financial Times, the marketing major of HHL's Master in Management Program occupied one of the top spots (4th place) among the 70 analyzed masters in management programs.

Together with Timo Meynhardt, Andreas Pinkwart, Andreas Suchanek, and Henning Zülch, Kirchgeorg developed the Leipzig Leadership Model, which was published in 2016.

== Publications ==
- Manfred Kirchgeorg: Ökologieorientiertes Unternehmensverhalten – Typologien und Erklärungsansätze auf empirischer Grundlage. Wiesbaden 1990, ISBN 3409133666
- Heribert Meffert, Manfred Kirchgeorg: Marktorientiertes Umweltmanagement – Grundlagen und Fallstudien. 3rd edition, Stuttgart 1998, ISBN 3791005863
- Manfred Kirchgeorg: Marktstrategisches Kreislaufmanagement: Ziele, Strategien und Strukturkonzepte. Wiesbaden 1999, at the same time: habilitations treatise, Universität Münster (Westfalen), 1998, ISBN 3409189890
- Manfred Kirchgeorg, Werner M. Dornscheidt und Wilhelm Giese: Handbuch Messemanagement. Wiesbaden 2003, ISBN 3409124179
- Bernd Schäppi, Mogens M. Andreasen, Manfred Kirchgeorg, Franz-Josef Radermacher: Handbuch Produktentwicklung. Wiesbaden 2005, ISBN 3446228381
- Manfred Kirchgeorg, Werner M. Dornscheidt, Wilhelm Giese, Norbert Stoeck: Trade Show Management. Wiesbaden 2005, ISBN 9783409143332
- Manfred Bruhn, Manfred Kirchgeorg and Johannes Meier: Marktorientierte Führung im wirtschaftlichen und gesellschaftlichen Wandel. Wiesbaden 2007, ISBN 9783834903709
- Manfred Kirchgeorg, Christiane Springer, Christian Brühe: Live Communication Management: Ein strategischer Leitfaden zur Konzeption, Umsetzung und Erfolgskontrolle. Wiesbaden 2009, ISBN 3834910252
- Christoph Burmann, Heribert Meffert and Manfred Kirchgeorg: Marketing Arbeitsbuch: Aufgaben – Fallstudien – Lösungen. 11th edition, Wiesbaden 2013, ISBN 978-3-8349-3863-3
- Christoph Burmann, Heribert Meffert, Manfred Kirchgeorg and Maik Eisenbeiß: Marketing: Grundlagen marktorientierter Unternehmensführung. 13th edition, Wiesbaden 2018, ISBN 3658211954
- Heribert Meffert, Peter Kenning, and Manfred Kirchgeorg (Ed.): Sustainable Marketing Management – Grundlagen und Cases. Wiesbaden 2014, ISBN 978-3-658-02436-9
- Manfred Kirchgeorg, Timo Meynhardt, Andreas Pinkwart, Andreas Suchanek, Henning Zülch, Das Leipziger Führungsmodell: The Leipzig Leadership Model, Leipzig 2017, ISBN 9783981850925
- Manfred Bruhn, Manfred Kirchgeorg, Marketing Weiterdenken: Zukunftspfade für eine marktorientierte Unternehmensführung, Wiesbaden 2017, ISBN 9783658185381
- Manfred Kirchgeorg, Werner M. Dornscheidt, Norbert Stoeck: Handbuch Messemanagement - Planung, Durchführung und Kontrolle von Messen, Kongressen und Events, 2. Aufl., Wiesbaden 2018, ISBN 978-3-8349-3368-3
