= Timo Meynhardt =

German psychologist and business economist

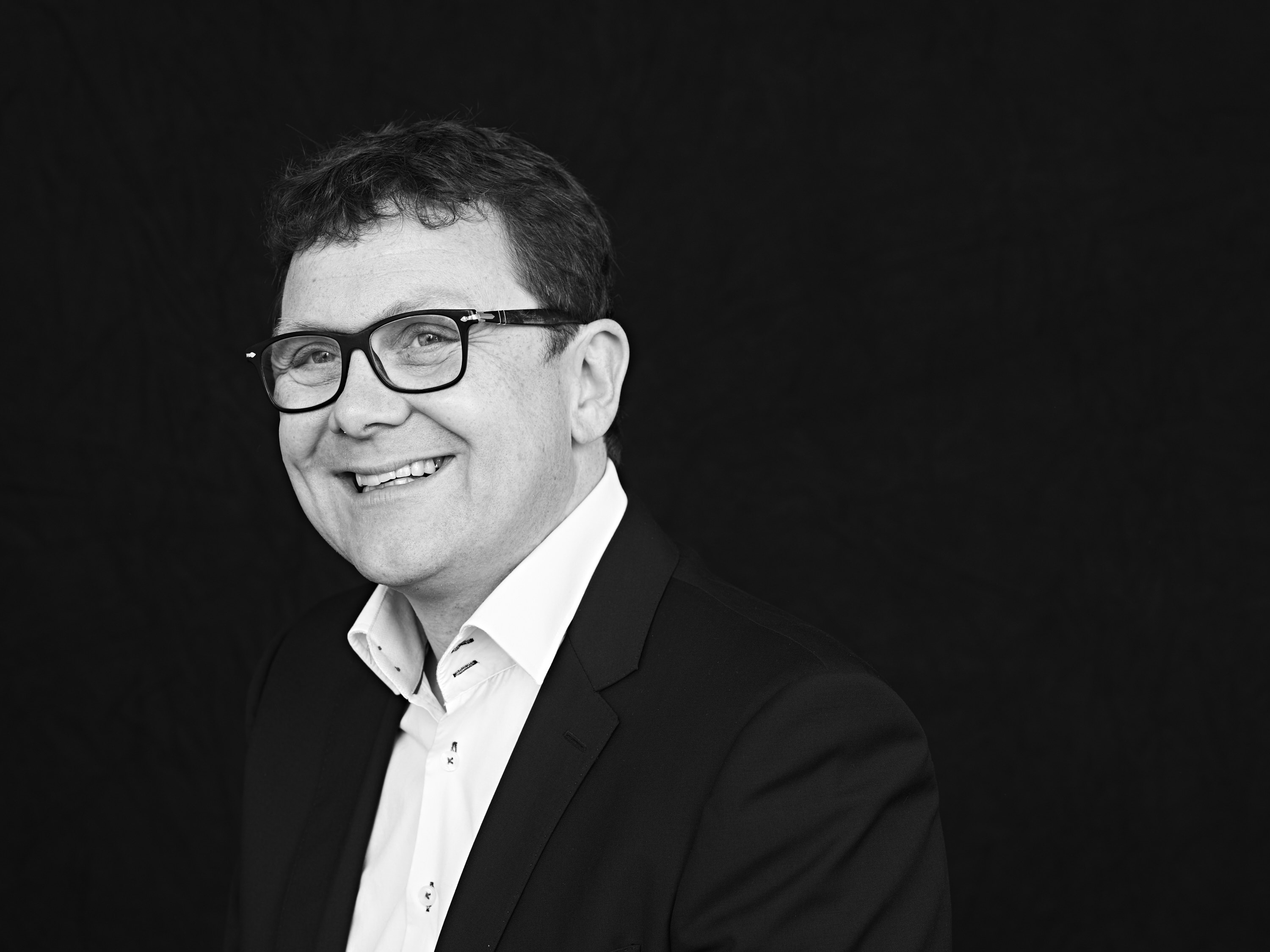
Timo Meynhardt

Timo Meynhardt (born 14 July 1972 in Rudolstadt) is a German psychologist and business economist. Since October 2015, he has been holding the Dr. Arend Oetker Chair of Business Psychology and Leadership at HHL Leipzig Graduate School of Management. Furthermore, he is the managing director of the Center for Leadership and Values in Society at the University of St. Gallen. From 2013 to 2015, he held the Chair of Management at the Leuphana University in Lüneburg.

== Biography ==
Meynhardt studied psychology at the Friedrich Schiller University Jena, at the Oxford Brookes University (under Michael Argyle), and in Beijing, graduating from the Jena University as a M.A. in psychology (Diplompsychologe). He held a scholarship from the Study Foundation of the German People (Studienstiftung des deutschen Volkes). In 2003 he obtained his Doctorate at the University of St. Gallen. In 2013 he received a habilitation from the same university, qualifying as a lecturer (Venia Legendi) in business economics with a special focus on organizational and personnel management. From 1999 until 2007 he worked as a practice expert at McKinsey & Company, Inc. in Berlin.

Meynhardt is married and has two daughters and a son.

== Research interests ==
In his research, Meynhardt combines psychological and business management topics:

- Public value (or Gemeinwohl): Meynhardt developed the St. Gallen Public Value approach in keeping with the intellectual tradition of Peter Drucker and the St. Gallen Management Model and based on the work by Hans Ulrich and Walter Krieg. The societal wealth creation of an organization is captured conceptually and examined empirically by means of philosophical value, psychological, and sociological theories. Meynhardt thus attempts to answer management’s question regarding the public value contribution of businesses, public authorities, and non-governmental organizations. Under his guidance, the Public Value Atlas of Switzerland (GemeinwohlAtlas) was developed, which transparently represents the contribution to the common good of the largest Swiss companies and organizations from the population’s point of view. After 2014, 2015 and 2017, the fourth Public Value Atlas Switzerland was published in September 2019. As for Germany, such a Public Value Atlas was published in 2015 and May 2019. On 1 October 2020 the Public Value Atlas was published for the first time on a local level for Leipzig.
- Competency management: His interest focuses on the analysis and assessment of individual competencies and their link to organizations’ core competencies.
- Leipzig Leadership Model: Being a member of the core team of HHL - Leipzig Graduate School of Management, he developed the Leipzig Leadership Model, which was published in 2016, along with Manfred Kirchgeorg, Andreas Pinkwart, Andreas Suchanek and Henning Zülch. As for the Leipzig Leadership Model, the contribution to the common good (public value) is characterized as a purpose, which is oriented towards a social benefit, serving as a motivating and legitimising function. Thus, public value becomes a resource of good leadership. According to the Leipzig formula, a purpose always requires a reference to the common good.

== Diagnostic tools ==
To date, Meynhardt has developed three social science diagnostic methods:

- “Value Knowledge Guide” (WertwissensGuide): Based on Peter Orlik’s “self-concept grid”, which follows in the tradition of George A. Kelly’s repertory grid, Meynhardt has developed a grid variant to analyze value knowledge in organizations.
- “My Competency Profile”: With this internet-based diagnostic method, Meynhardt developed an innovative method for the survey and automated analysis of basic competencies. The conceptual reference point is the work of John Erpenbeck and Volker Heyse.
- „Public Value Scorecard” (in collaboration with Peter Gomez): This tool transforms Meynhardt’s public value theory into a scorecard. The five available variations can be adapted to manifold corporate development issues.

== Awards ==
- Most Innovative Learning Approach Award, HHL Leipzig Graduate School of Management (2022)
- Public Value Fest Award (2022)
- Best Lecturer Award, HHL Leipzig Graduate School of Management (2017)
- Peter Werhahn Memorial Award, University of St. Gallen (2003)
- Examination prize of the Faculty of Social and Behavioral Sciences at the Friedrich-Schiller-University Jena (1999)

== Offices ==
- Co-founder and chairman of the non-profit organisation Forum Gemeinwohl
- Co-initiator of the Round Table for Common Good Leipzig
- Member of the scientific advisory board of Central German Broadcasting MDR
- Scientific adviser to the Bund Katholischer Unternehmer
- Jury board of the Public Value Award for Start-Ups
