= ICT University =

Private university in Cameroon

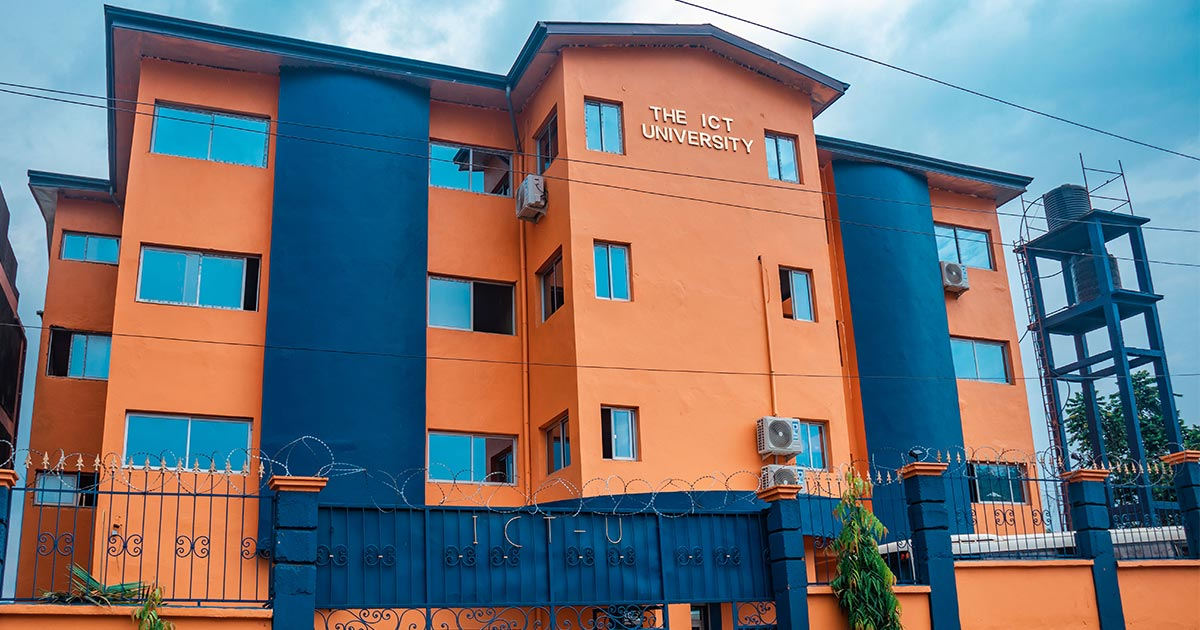
- Motto: Imparting ICTs in all academic disciplines
- Type: Private University
- Established: 2010; 16 years ago
- Founder: Victor Mbarika
- Chancellor: Jean-Emmanuel Pondi
- President: Victor Mbarika
- Location: Yaounde, Centre, 526, Cameroon; 3.9527°N 11.5166°E
- Language: French, English
- Website: ictuniversity.edu.cm
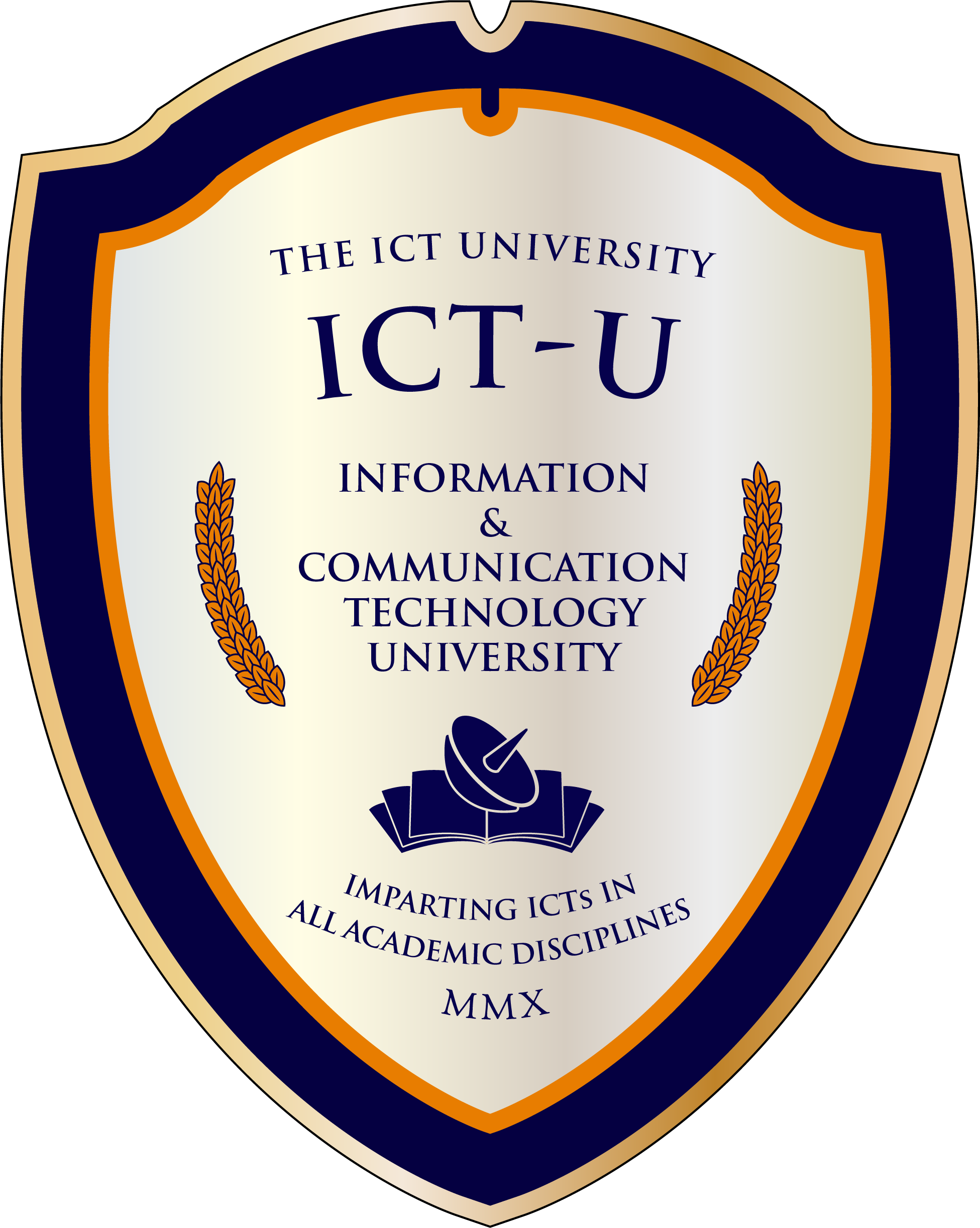

ICT University is an accredited private university located in Yaoundé, Cameroon. It aims to provide ICT and Managerial Human Capacity Development in developing countries.

== Background ==
ICT University started in 2010 and it currently serves more than 15,000 students via on-site and online programs around the World.
The University develops productive and relevant Diploma, Bachelors, Masters and Doctoral level scholars to utilize their research and training in solving the substantial problems in their countries.

== Programs and departments ==
- Bachelors of science in Natural science
- Bachelors of science in accounting
- Bachelors of science in ICT
- Masters of Arts in Regional Development Planning
- Masters of science in Applied statistics
- Masters of science in Information and communication technology
- Masters of science in Information systems and networking
- Masters of science in public health
- Masters of science in Telecommunication
- Masters in Business management and sustainable development
- Masters in International Business Administration
- PhD in public health
- PhD in Business Administration
- PhD in Business Administration for Sustainable Development
- PhD in Software Engineering
- PhD in Data Communication and Networking
- PhD in Telecommunication
- PhD in Information and Communication Technology

== ICT University Foundation ==
The ICT University Foundation is registered and chartered in the USA. It is the funding organ of all ICT University campuses. It also funds donations of ICT equipment, E-Learning laboratories and E-Libraries for many universities in developing nations in Africa. The headquarter of African campuses is in Cameroon. The University's Cameroon campus is accredited by Cameroon Ministry of Higher Education in 2012.

== Research Center ==
The Professors Terry and Linda Byrd Research Centre is hosted by ICT University and it is a research institution that examines, analyses, surveys, assesses, grades, and understands so-called exponential technologies and their utilisation in advancing the business, health, education, and general welfare of humanity, especially in the Sub Saharan Africa region.

ICT University Information and Communications Department created the ICT Center for Cybersecurity Studies in 2020 and offering courses in Cybersecurity and Data Privacy. These courses are tailored around the Confidentiality, Integrity, and Available and enable graduates to potentially earn Certification from ISACA or ISC2.
