= National Presto Industries =

Manufacturer of kitchen appliances

National Presto Industries, Inc.
- Type: Public
- Traded as: NYSE: NPK; S&P 600 Component
- Industry: Consumer products
- Founded: 1905; 121 years ago
- Headquarters: Eau Claire, Wisconsin, United States
- Area served: Worldwide
- Key people: Maryjo Cohen (President and CEO)
- Products: Small Kitchen appliances, Ammunition, and Absorbent Products
- Revenue: $405.3M
- Website: www.gopresto.com/

National Presto Industries is a company founded in 1905 in Eau Claire, Wisconsin. Originally called "Northwestern Steel and Iron Works" the company changed its name to the "National Pressure Cooker Company" in 1929 and then National Presto Industries, Inc. 1953. The company originally produced pressure canners for commercial, and later home, use. Beginning in 1939, the company introduced small home-use cooking appliances. The company was admitted to the New York Stock Exchange on March 3, 1969.

== Background ==
The company is divided into three business segments (divisions), Housewares/Small Appliance; Defense; and Safety. The Housewares/Small Appliance segment "designs and sells small household appliances", including pressure cookers, under the Presto brand. The Defense segment produces ordnance and ammunition products. The Safety Segment consists of two startups. The first is Rusoh, Inc., which designs and markets the Rusoh® Eliminator® fire extinguisher, the first self-service fire extinguisher. The second is OneEvent Technologies, Inc. It offers systems that provide early warning of conditions that could ultimately lead to significant losses.

Having previously divested itself of almost all operations and having closed its defense operations in 1992, the company was a small household appliance seller. In 2001, with the purchase of AMTEC, the company returned to the defense business. In 2007, Presto won, in appeal, against the U.S. Securities and Exchange Commission over investment status. The company does not have to register as a mutual fund.
