= Orin R. Smith =

Orin R. Smith was chairman and chief executive officer of the Engelhard Corporation from 1995 to 2000. He joined Engelhard as vice president in 1977, became president in 1984. Prior to joining Engelhard, Smith served as president of M&T Chemicals. Smith served on the advisory board for the New Jersey Institute of Technology and is a trustee of Centenary College of New Jersey. He is also a board member for Ingersoll-Rand and Vulcan Materials Company.

Smith is also a recipient of the Ellis Island Medal of Honor. A resident of the Gladstone section of Peapack-Gladstone, New Jersey, Smith graduated with honors from Brown University and holds an M.B.A. from Seton Hall University's Stillman School of Business.
