= Jeanine Rhea =

American professor of business management

Jeanine Newton Rhea
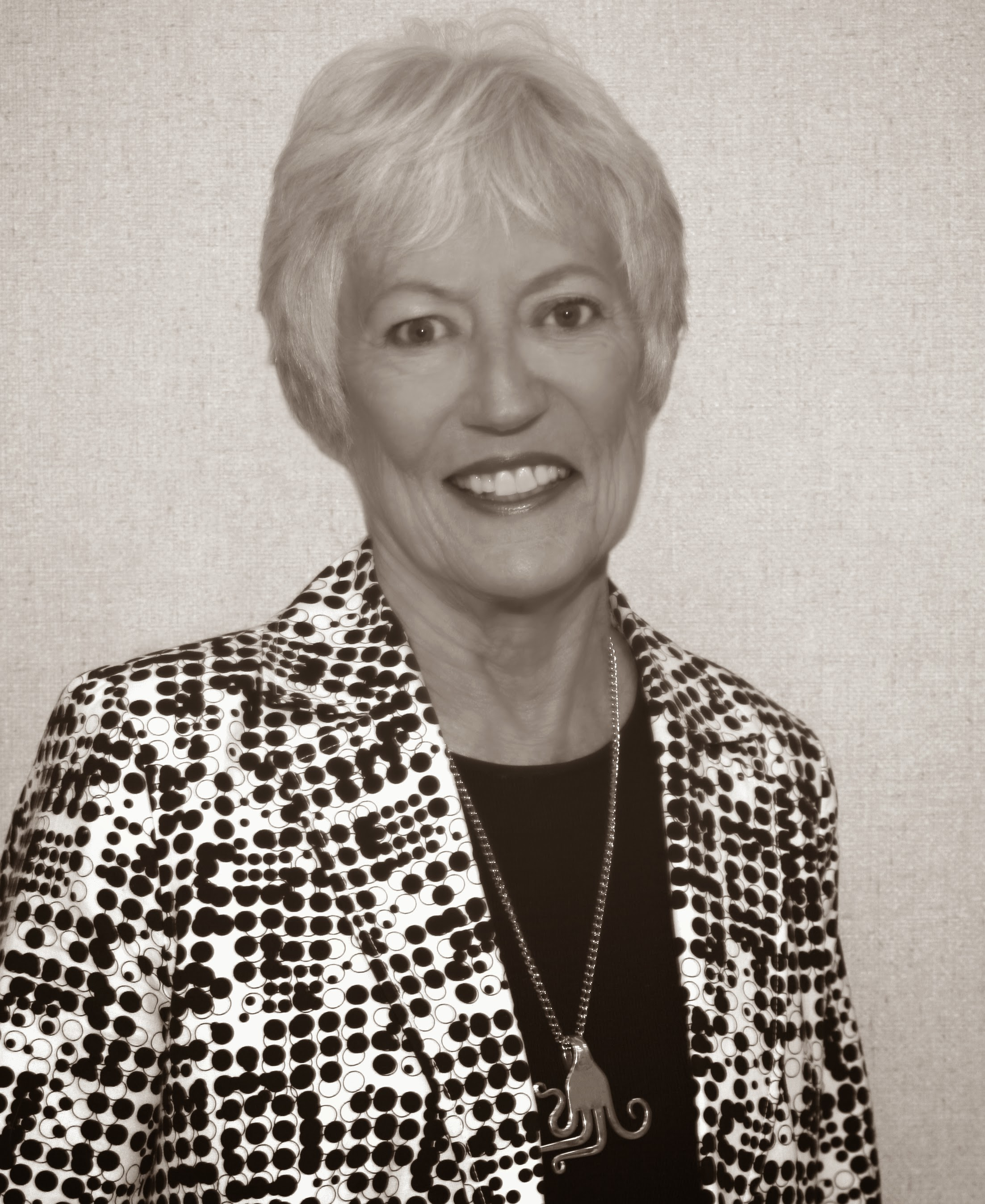
- Born: Plattsmouth, Nebraska
- Education: University of Nebraska, Memphis State University, Oklahoma State University
- Occupation: Professor Emeritus in the Department of Management in the William S. Spears School of Business at Oklahoma State University
- Known for: creation of “managing diversity in the workplace" course
- Spouse: Jim Rhea

Jeanine Rhea is Professor Emeritus in the Department of Management in the William S. Spears School of Business at Oklahoma State University. Rhea taught at Oklahoma State from 1976 until 2004. With the money from an OSU grant, Rhea conducted research in the area of women in management and created a course out of her findings called "administrative strategies for women in business," which later became known as "managing diversity in the workplace." This course gained Rhea nationwide recognition and thousands of students have since participated in the course. In 2005, Rhea was inducted into the Oklahoma Women's Hall of Fame. Currently, Rhea works as a performance consultant for Greenwood Performance Systems.

== Early life ==
Jeanine Newton was born in Plattsmouth, Nebraska, a small town located 13 miles south of Omaha, Nebraska. For the first two years of her higher education, Jeanine attended Nebraska Wesleyan University, where she met her husband, James William Rhea. The two were married at the end of their sophomore year and transferred to the University of Nebraska. She earned her bachelor's degree in education from the University of Nebraska in 1960. After their graduation, the young couple moved to Nebraska City, Nebraska where she opened a dance studio. In February 1962, Jeanine and Jim introduced their first daughter, Jena. And, in April 1964, came the birth of their second daughter, Jill. Later that year, Jim decided he wanted to get a master's degree, so the couple moved to Lawrence, Kansas where Rhea began teaching high school in Kansas City, Kansas. Rhea and her husband then moved to Memphis, Tennessee where Rhea began to work on her master's degree. In 1969, she earned a master's degree from Memphis State University. In November 1969, Jerald William Rhea was born, their first and only son. After Jim finished his PhD from Ohio University, the young family moved to Stillwater, Oklahoma in 1970. Rhea began working on her doctorate degree upon moving there. In 1975, she received her doctorate from Oklahoma State University.

== Career ==
Rhea was hired at Oklahoma State University after receiving her doctorate, where she began teaching business communications and methods. Around 1975, Rhea began teaching a class titled "women in business." Rhea later applied for an OSU Presidential Challenge Grant to do work in the area of women in business. Once she was awarded the grant, Rhea began a period of research that inspired the class "administrative strategies for women in business," later known as "managing diversity in the workplace." This course gained Rhea nationwide recognition and thousands of students have since participated in the course. Rhea continued teaching at Oklahoma State University until her retirement in 2004, gaining her professor emeritus status with the university. Rhea is currently a Performance Consultant for her husband Jim's company, Greenwood Performance Systems, Inc.

== Academic involvement ==
Rhea has been involved in many organizations, including:

- National Communication Association
- American Society for Training and Development
- Southwest Administrative Services Association
- Delta Mu Delta
- Beta Gamma Sigma
- Delta Phi Epsilon

== Awards and recognition ==
- Inductee of the Oklahoma Higher Education Hall of Fame (2007)
- Inductee of the Oklahoma Women's Hall of Fame (2005)
- Jeanine Rhea/Oklahoma International Women's Forum (OIWF) Endowed Professorship (2007)
