= Karen Boroff =

American academic

Karen E. Boroff
- Education: Cornell University (BS); Lehigh University (BMA); Columbia University (PhD)
- Employer: Seton Hall University
- Title: Dean, Stillman School of Business
- Term: 2001 - present
- Board member of: New York Society of Security Analysts and Beta Gamma Sigma International Business Honor Society

Notes
- Link to Photo

Karen E. Boroff is an educator, researcher, and administrator in American higher education. She is the former dean of Seton Hall University’s Stillman School of Business. She is noted for her focus on integrity, innovation and excellence in leading the School to increased prominence within the State of New Jersey and nationally.

== Education and early career ==
Boroff earned a PhD in Business from Columbia University, an MBA from Lehigh University and a BS in Industrial and Labor Relations from Cornell University. Boroff was employed by AT&T for 11 years, where she served in various managerial capacities and acted as a negotiator and company spokesperson for 26,000 employees.

== Seton Hall ==
In 1989, she joined Seton Hall as a member of the faculty in the department of management. She taught both undergraduate and graduate courses in management, organizational behavior, negotiations, compensation and industrial relations. Boroff was promoted to associate professor in 1995 and five years later was named a full professor. She served as acting dean of the Stillman School for more than a year before being appointed dean. Her teaching expertise encompassed management, negotiations, human resources and industrial relations, and she has done extensive research on the areas of grievance and complaint processes, and labor law.

== Stillman School of Business ==
While dean at Stillman, Boroff instituted new programs and increased the school's prominence nationally. She initiated the development of a code of conduct for the Stillman School, as well as a lecture series focused on integrity in business practice. During her tenure, the School opened its Trading Room, complete with the data feeds from Bloomberg L.P. After winning the NYSSA Annual Research Investment Challenge in 2006, Boroff and the Stillman Business School team of student investors rang the opening bell on Wall Street. In 2005, the School opened its Seton Hall Sports Polling Center, which now conducts national polls on sport issues of the day. Responding to the needs of the New Jersey business community, Boroff’s most recent innovation is the creation of a program to educate entrepreneurs. In 2010, Stillman Business School ranked 56th nationally among undergraduate business schools. This past September, the Stillman School was cited again by U.S. News & World Report as among the top 100 programs among all the U.S. business programs nationally. In January 2008, the School earned the Council on Higher Education Accreditation’s award on Institutional Outcomes Assessment.

Under Boroff’s leadership, the Stillman School earned reaccreditation by the Association to Advance Collegiate Schools of Business (AACSB) International, which puts the school among the most rigorous business programs in the United States. Stillman School programs meet a standard of excellence held by just over 25 percent of business programs nationwide.

Boroff was the inaugural director of the Stillman School’s prestigious Leadership Studies Program, an honors program to enhance students’ leadership competencies. In this program, high achieving students develop their leadership abilities through interacting with corporate mentors.

Boroff stepped down as Dean of the Stillman School in May, 2010 and returned to the classroom as a professor of Management until December 2016. On January 1, 2017, Boroff took over as Interim Provost and Executive Vice President of Seton Hall University.

== Honors, affiliations and awards ==
- Academy of Management
- New York Society of Security Analysts Board of Directors,
- Beta Gamma Sigma International Business Honor Society Board Member 2004-2008.

== Publications ==
- Karen E. Boroff and David Lewin, LOYALTY; VOICE, AND INTENT TO EXIT A UNION FIRM: A CONCEPTUAL AND EMPIRICAL ANALYSIS, Industrial and Labor Relations Review, October, 1997, Cornell University.
- Karen E. Boroff, A Note on an Unpublished Manuscript by CWA Leader A. Tommy Jones, Labor History, 1469-9702, Volume 37, Issue 4, 1996, Pages 516 – 519
- Karen E Boroff, Exploring Preferences for Procedural and Distributive Justice, Institutional Repositories and Research Assessment, 1999A, page 266.
- Karen E Boroff, ULP Charges Filed in Existing Bargaining, Institutional Repositories and Research Assessment, 1995A, page 305.
- Karen E Boroff, Unfair Labor Practices Filed in Organizing Elections: An Empirical Analysis, Institutional Repositories and Research Assessment, 1998A, page 381.
- Keefe Jeffrey, Boroff Karen, 1994, "Telecommunications labor – management relations: one decade after the AT&T divestiture", in Contemporary Collective Bargaining in the Private Sector Ed. P B Voos (Industrial Relations Research Association, Madison, WI) pp 303 – 371
