= John R. Brazil =

American academic administrator

John Russell Brazil (March 5, 1946 – June 2, 2022) was an American university administrator and professor of English and American studies. He was the president of Trinity University, Southeastern Massachusetts University, and Bradley University.

== Early life ==
John Russel Brazil was born on March 5, 1946 and grew up in northern California. His parents were Helen and Burton Brazil. He received an A.B. in History in 1968 from Stanford University. He then attended Yale University, earning a Master of Philosophy in 1972 and a Ph.D. in American studies in 1975. He is a member of Beta Gamma Sigma, Phi Beta Kappa, and Phi Kappa Phi honor societies.

== Career ==
In 1968, Brazil was a teaching fellow at Yale, where he taught American studies, English, and history. He joined the faculty of San Jose State University in 1973, eventually becoming the Vice President of Academic Affairs. He became an English professor and president of Southeastern Massachusetts University in 1984, that title changing to chancellor when the university became part of the University of Massachusetts system as the University of Massachusetts Dartmouth.

In 1989, Brazil was one of the university presidents selected to participate in the U.S. Department of Education and American Association of State Colleges and Universities undertaking in the Soviet Union. He became president of Bradley University in Peoria, Illinois in 1992. While at Bradley, he oversaw a capital campaign that raised more than $125 million.

In 1999, he became the 17th president of Trinity University in San Antonio, Texas. He retired in January 2010.

Brazil served on the board of the Associated Colleges of the South, the Association of Presbyterian Colleges and Universities, the Independent Colleges and Universities of Texas, the National Association of Independent Colleges and Universities, the Southern Collegiate Athletic Conference, and the Texas Independent College Fund. He was president of the Higher Education Council of San Antonio. He published articles in American Literary Realism, the American Quarterly, Mississippi Quarterly, and Twentieth-Century Literary Criticism.

== Honors ==
In 1980, Brazil was a Fulbright Senior Scholar of English and American studies at the University of Sydney. In 1997, he received an honorary doctorate from Samara State Aerospace University. Trinity University’s Board of Trustees presented Brazil with the Distinguished Service Award, the University's most prestigious honor.

He was an honorary member of Delta Mu Delta and Golden Key International Honour Society.

== Personal life ==
Brazil married Janice Hosking in 1971. They had a son, Adrian, and a daughter, Morgan.

He was a Director of Caterpillar Inc. from October 1998 until February 2010. He also served on the boards of the Greater San Antonio Chamber of Commerce, San Antonio Medical Foundation, the Southwest Research Institute, the Texas Research Park Foundation, the United Way of San Antonio and Bexar County, and the World Affairs Council of San Antonio.

Brazil died after a long illness on June 2, 2022, at the age of 76.
