= Victor Mbarika =

American college professor

Professor Victor Mbarika
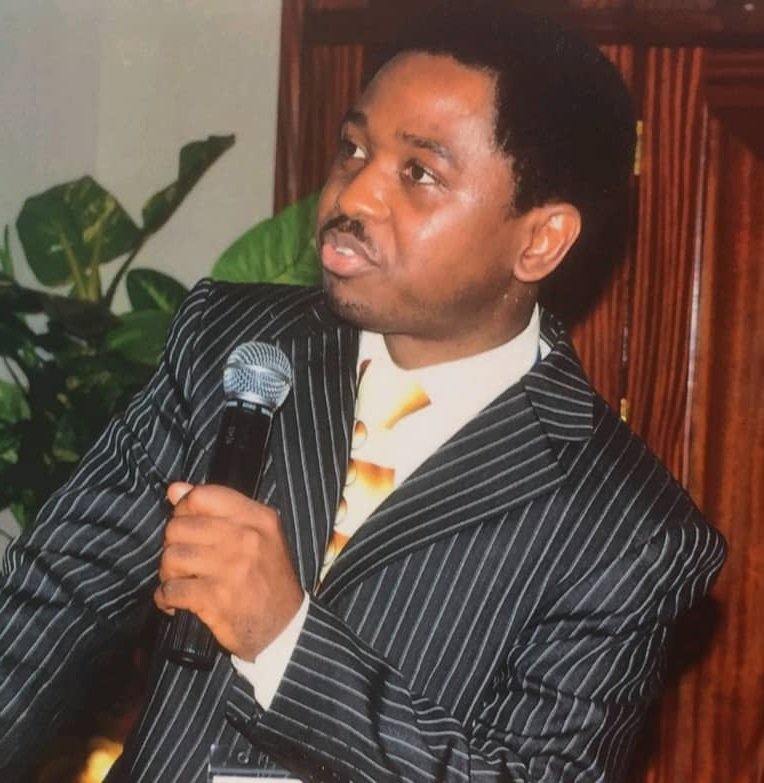

President, Board of Trustees, ICT University

Personal details
- Education: Auburn University (PhD); University of Illinois
- Occupation: Full and Endowed Professor of Information and Communication Technology (ICT)
- Awards: KPMG Foundation Doctoral Scholar; Fulbright recipient (2009), (2011), (2012), (2015), (2016); National Science Foundation career grant; Lifetime Achievement Awards
- Website: mbarika.com

Victor Mbarika is a Cameroonian Information and Communication Technology expert and academic based in the United States of American. He is currently a professor of MIS and Stallings International Distinguished Scholar at East Carolina University in Greenville, North Carolina, United States. He is the President of Board of Trustees of the ICT University.

== Education ==
Mbarika earned his Master's degree in Management Information Systems (MIS) from The University of Illinois at Chicago in 1997, and a Ph.D. in MIS from Auburn University in 2000.

== Career and research ==
Mbarika's research is focused on ICT implementation in Africa and has developed a theoretical framework for understanding ICTs in less developed countries and understanding the contextual differences that dictate information systems research in less advantaged environments. He is founding editor-in-chief of The African Journal of Information Systems and senior board member for several academic journals.

He is the founder of the International Center for Information Technology and Development (ICITD), East Carolina University, Greenville, which focuses on IT training and development in e-health, e-education and e-democracy in Sub Saharan Africa. Mbarika is a five-time Fulbright-MCMC research grants recipient.

He is facilitator of The ICT for Africa conference series (ICT4 Africa), the ICT University Foundation and Cameroon Youths for Jesus (CYJ).

In 2020, Premium Times reported that a spokesperson for Abdullahi Umar Ganduje, governor of Kano State of Nigeria, claimed that Ganduje had received a letter from Mbarika indicating Ganduje's appointment as a visiting professor at East Carolina University. The university later released a statement confirming Mbarika as its faculty member but denied offering the appointment stating that Mbarika acted on his own because he is not an authorized official to make such an appointment.

== Honors and awards ==
- African Achievers Award (2023) in London, United Kingdom for his "Outstanding contribution to computer science and telecommunications" and his "Contribution to ICT Research and Education"
- President’s Lifetime Achievement Award by former U.S. President Joe Biden for his contributions to education and poverty alleviation.
- The TEH-BENG (Pillar of Society) title by the Meta Fons Union in Yaoundé, Cameroon for his contributions to ICT development in the region.

== Selected books ==
- Ayo, C. K. and Mbarika, V. (Eds.). (2017). Sustainable ICT Adoption and Integration for Socio-Economic Development. IGI Global, Hershey, Pennsylvania, USA.
- Mbarika, V. and Adebayo, A. P. (2015). Information and Communication Technology for Secondary Schools. AGWECAMS Publishers.
- Kituyi G., Moya, M. and Mbarika, V. (2013). Computerized Accounting and Finance: Applications in Business. Makerere University Business School.
- Hinson, R., Boateng, R. and Mbarika, V. (Eds.). (2009). Electronic Commerce and Customer Management in Ghana. Accra, Ghana: Pro Write Publishing.
- Kizza, J.M., Muhirwe, J., Aisbett, J., Getao, K., Mbarika, V., Patel, D. and Rodrigues, A. J. (Eds.). (2007). Strengthening the Role of ICT in Development. Fountain Publishers: Kampala, Uganda.
- Sankar, C.S., Mbarika, V., & Raju, P.K. (2006). Use of Information Technologies in Businesses and Society: Learning Through Real-World Case Studies. Anderson, SC: Tavenner Publishers.
- Raju, P.K., Sankar, C. & Mbarika, V. (2005). POWERTEL Case Study: Coverage of a Larger Area versus Better Frequency Re-Use in Wireless Communications. Anderson, SC: Tavenner Publishers.
- Mbarika, V. (2001). Africa’s Least Developed Countries’ Teledensity Problems and Strategies. Yaounde, Cameroon: ME & Agwecam Publishers.
