= Kenneth T. Wessner =

American health executive (1922–1994)

Kenneth T. Wessner (1922–1994) was an American health executive.

== Early life and education ==
Born in 1922 in Sinking Spring, Pennsylvania, Wessner earned a Bachelor of Science degree from Wheaton College in 1947. He received honorary doctorates from Wheaton College and The King's College in New York City and was a member of the Beta Gamma Sigma Honor Society at DePaul University.

== Career ==
Wessner joined ServiceMaster, a consumer services company based in Downers Grove, in 1954. He rose through various senior positions, becoming president and chief operating officer in 1973, and subsequently president and chief executive officer in 1975, a role he held until 1983. He served as chairman of the board from 1981 to 1990 and as vice chairman for an additional year before retiring. During his tenure at ServiceMaster, the company expanded its services to include management services to hospitals and healthcare businesses, beginning with a contract in 1962 with Lutheran General Hospital.

Wessner also chaired the board of trustees of Wheaton College from 1983 to 1988 and served on various civic and professional boards. His contributions were recognized with an award from the Religious Heritage of America in 1991, induction into the American Business Hall of Fame in 1992, and the National Health Care Hall of Fame in 1993.
