= Maryjo Cohen =

American business executive

- Born: 1952 (age 73–74); Eau Claire, Wisconsin, USA
- Education: University of Michigan
- Occupations: President, CEO of National Presto Industries
- Years active: 1976–present

Maryjo J. Cohen is an American business executive known as the chief executive officer of National Presto Industries. Cohen has been quoted as saying, "Just about all our competitors have merged or gone out of business. We're the last of the independents."

== Biography ==
Cohen has been chief executive officer of National Presto Industries since May 1994 and has been its president since May 1989. Ms. Cohen serves as a treasurer of Presto Manufacturing Company Inc. She served as interim chief financial officer of National Presto Industries Inc., from June 2008 to September 2008, treasurer since September 1983 and served as its vice president since May 1986. Ms. Cohen has been the chairman of National Presto Industries Inc. since January 2002, when she took over from her retiring father. She has been with the National Presto Industries Inc. since 1976, her entire professional career. Prior to becoming an Officer, she served as an Associate Resident Counsel and Assistant to the Treasurer of National Presto. Ms. Cohen has been a director of National Presto Industries Inc. since 1988. Her total annual compensation as of 2014 was $609,752. It was $700,786 in 2017.

Under Cohen's leadership, the company acquired AMTEC Corporation in February 2001. AMTEC manufactures 40mm ammunition and precision mechanical and electro-mechanical products for the U.S. Department of Defense (DOD). In July 2003 they acquired Spectra Technologies, which produces munitions and ordinance related products for the DOD and its chief contractors. In 2006, she oversaw the acquisition of Amron LLC, a cartridge case producer used in medium caliber ammunition (primarily for the Department of Defense). In 2016, she oversaw the acquisition of Rusoh Inc, which produces a self-service fire extinguisher.

Cohen is the granddaughter of the late Lewis (L.E.) Phillips (1899–1978), who with his brother Jay (1898–1992), acquired a controlling interest in Presto in 1942. Their father, Ed Phillips, started Ed Phillips and Sons in 1912, which is a liquor distiller (Phillips Distilling Company) and distribution company. Cohen is the officer of the L.E. Phillips Family Foundation. She is listed as one of the notable members of Beta Gamma Sigma and was a 2013 recipient of the "Futuremakers Partner Award." Her father, Melvin S. Cohen (1918–2008), was for many decades the leader at Presto, after taking over from his father-in-law L.E. Phillips. They took the company public in 1969. Her mother, Eileen Cohen Phillips (1926–2017), an only child, was the first in her family to graduate college, and Maryjo and her older sister Amy followed her to the University of Michigan. Maryjo is also a graduate of the University of Michigan Law School. Through Jay Phillips, she is a cousin by marriage to both Pauline Phillips (a.k.a. Abigail Van Buren/Dear Abby) and her grandson by adoption, MN US Rep Dean Phillips.
