= Dimitri Azar =

American ophthalmologist

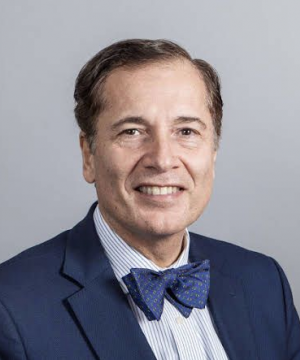
- Education: American University of Beirut, Lebanon; Wilmer Eye Institute, Johns Hopkins Hospital School of Medicine; Massachusetts Eye and Ear Infirmary, Harvard Medical School; University of Chicago Booth School of Business
- Scientific career
- Fields: Ophthalmology
- Workplaces: University of Illinois at Chicago; American Ophthalmological Society; Chicago Ophthalmological Society; Chicago Medical Society; Association of Research in Vision and Ophthalmology; Verily; Verb Surgical Inc; Tear Film and Ocular Surface Society; Novartis

Dimitri Azar is an American ophthalmologist, professor, inventor and current CEO of Lacristat, a San Jose based ophthalmology bio-tech company. Dr. Azar previously founded Twenty Twenty Therapeutics, a joint venture established by Santen and Verily. The Twenty Twenty products were ultimately transferred to Santen and Verily in September 2024. Azar served as a board member of Novartis and a member of the scientific advisory board of Verily, Alphabet's Life sciences research organization. He served as dean of the College of Medicine at the University of Illinois at Chicago (UIC) from 2011 to 2018, and is currently Distinguished Professor and Executive Dean Emeritus.

== Education ==
Azar received his medical degree from the American University of Beirut, Lebanon. Azar practiced at the Wilmer Eye Institute at the Johns Hopkins Hospital School of Medicine, and completed his fellowship and residency training at the Massachusetts Eye and Ear Infirmary at Harvard Medical School, where he was a tenured professor of ophthalmology (2003–2006) and senior scientist at the Schepens Eye Research Institute.

Azar also holds an honorary master's degree from Harvard, as well as an Executive Master of Business Administration from the University of Chicago Booth School of Business.

== Academic positions ==
After serving as tenured professor at Harvard Medical School, Azar joined UIC as a professor of ophthalmology, bioengineering and pharmacology, where he also served as head of the Department of Ophthalmology and Visual Sciences and B.A. Field Endowed Chair of Ophthalmologic Research. He has published more than 500 scientific articles, chapters and patents with over 20,000 citations. He is a member of the American Ophthalmological Society, former president of the Chicago Ophthalmological Society, president-elect of the Chicago Medical Society, and former Trustee of the Association of Research in Vision and Ophthalmology (ARVO).

== Commercial roles ==
Azar is the CEO of Lacristat, a San Jose headquartered ophthalmology biotech company and serves as Senior Advisor at Verily. Until recently, he was the founder and chief executive officer of Twenty Twenty Therapeutics, a joint venture between Verily Life Sciences and Santen.

He was a non-executive member of Novartis' Board of Directors from 2012 until 2019. He was also a member of the Audit and Compliance Committee and the Research & Development Committee.

Azar was a senior director of ophthalmological innovation at Verily, where ophthalmological projects include the development of smart contact lenses, including lenses designed to assist those with presbyopia and an intraocular lens. He was on the board of Verb Surgical Inc. and sits on the board of the Tear Film and Ocular Surface Society in the US. He also sits on the board of Jellisee and the Cure Blindness Project (aka, Himalayan Cataract Project).

== Published books ==
- Azar DT, Steinert R., Stark WJ, editors. Excimer Laser Therapy: Phototherapeutic Keratectomy Baltimore, MD: Williams & Wilkins; 1997 ISBN 978-0683303469
- Azar DT. Refractive Surgery. Stamford, CT: Appleton & Lange-Simon and Schuster; 1997 ISBN 978-0323035996
- Difficult and Complicated Cases in Refractive Surgery, Jorge L. Alió and Dimitri T. Azar, Springer, 2015 ISBN 978-3642552373
- Pharmacologic Therapy of Ocular Disease (Handbook of Experimental Pharmacology), Scott M. Whitcup and Dimitri T. Azar, Springer 2017 ISBN 978-3319582887
- Albert DM, Jakobiec FA; (Azar DT, and Gragoudas ES associate editors to FAJ). Principles and Practice of Ophthalmology Second Edition. Philadelphia, PA: Saunders; 1999. ISBN 978-0721675008
- Jakobiec FA, Azar DT, editors. Pediatric Ophthalmology; International Ophthalmology Clinics; Winter 1992. ISBN 978-0316456524
- Azar DT, editor. (Stark WJ, Azar NF, Pineda R, Yoo SH, associate editors). Intraocular Lenses in Cataract and Refractive Surgery. Philadelphia PA; Saunders; May 2001. ISBN 9780721686998
- Melki SA, Azar DT, editors. 101 Pearls in Refractive, Cataract, and Corneal Surgery. Thorofare, NJ: Slack; June 2001. ISBN 978-1-55642-684-1
- Azar DT, Koch DD, editors. LASIK: Fundamentals, Surgical Techniques, and Complications. New York, NY: Marcel Dekker; November 2002. ISBN 978-0824745776
- Tsubota K, Boxer-Wachler B, Azar DT, Koch DD, editors. Hyperopia and Presbyopia. New York, NY: Marcel Dekker; 2003. ISBN 978-0824741075
- Foster CS, Azar DT, Dohlman CH, editors. Smolin and Thoft's The Cornea: Scientific Foundations and Clinical Practice, 4th Edition. Baltimore, MD: Lippincott Williams & Wilkins; 2005. ISBN 978-0781742061
- Azar DT, Camellin M, Yee R, editors. LASEK, PRK, and Excimer Laser Stromal Surface Ablation. New York, NY: Marcel Dekker; 2005. ISBN 978-0824754341
- Melki SA, Azar DT, editors. 101 Pearls in Refractive, Cataract, and Corneal Surgery, 2nd Edition. Thorofare, NJ: Slack; 2006. ISBN 978-1556426841
- Azar DT, editor. (Gatinel D, Hoang-Xuan T, associate editors). Refractive Surgery, 2nd Edition. St. Louis, MO: Elsevier-Mosby, 2007. ISBN 978-0323035996
- Albert DM, Miller JW, editors, Azar DT, Blodi BA, associate editors. Albert and Jakobiec's Principles and Practice in Ophthalmology, 3rd Edition. Philadelphia, PA: Elsevier, 2008. ISBN 978-1437721119
- Alio JL, Azar DT editors. Management of Complications in Refractive Surgery. Springer-Verlag Berlin Heidelberg, 2008. ISBN 978-3540375838
- Azar DT, editor; BCSC 3. Clinical Optics, American Academy of Ophthalmology. San Francisco, CA; 2012. ISBN 978-1615255573
- Alio JL, Azar DT, Abbouda A, Asward E, editors. Difficult and Complicated Cases in Refractive Surgery. Springer-Verlag Berlin Heidelberg, 2015 ISBN 978-3642552373
- Azar DT, Rosen E. Yanoff and Duke's Cataract and Refractive Surgery e-book e-book searchable. ISBN 978-0323374941
- Whitcup S, Azar DT, editors. Pharmacologic Therapy of Ocular Disease. Springer Heidelberg, 2017 ISBN 978-3-319-58290-0
- Alio JL, Azar DT editors. Management of Complications in Refractive Surgery. Second Edition. Springer-verlap Berlin Heidelberg, 2018 ISBN 978-3-319-60561-6
- Azar DT, editor. Refractive Surgery, 3rd Edition. St. Louis, MO: Elsevier-Mosby, 2019. ISBN 978-0323547697
- Azar DT, Alio JL, Hallak J, Cortina SM, editors. Surgical management of Astigmatism, Jaypee Publishing, 2020 ISBN 978-9389188851
- Albert DM, Miller JW, Azar DT, Young LH, editors, Blodi BA, associate editors. Albert and Jakobiec's Principles and Practice in Ophthalmology, 4th Edition. Philadelphia, PA: by Springer Verlag. 2022 ISBN 9783030426347

== Awards and recognition ==
Azar is an internationally recognized ophthalmic surgeon and prolific researcher. He has been named one of The Best Doctors in America and one of the Castle Connolly Top Doctors in America annually since 1994. He holds multiple committee positions with the American Academy of Ophthalmology, is a member of the American Ophthalmological Association and sits on the board of trustees of the Chicago Ophthalmological Society and the Association of Research in Vision and Ophthalmology. He has received multiple leadership awards, including the 2009 Lans Distinguished Award from the International Society of Refractive Surgery, and the University of Illinois at Chicago Scholar Award. Azar was awarded the Life Achievement award by the American Academy of Ophthalmology for his sustained services to the organization. The International Society of Refractive Surgery, in 2013, awarded him with the Jose Barraquer Award and has also received the University of Illinois at Chicago Scholar Award, and the Distinguished Professor award in 2013. In 2016, Weill Cornell Medical College awarded Azar with the John McLean Medal.

From 2008 to 2010, Chicago Magazine, in cooperation with Castle Connelly Medical Ltd., listed Azar as one of the top doctors in ophthalmology. In 2016, he received the Castroviejo Award in recognition of exceptional contributions in support of the Society's mission from the American Academy of Ophthalmology, as well as the Ramon Castroviejo Award from the Cornea Society. On June 27, 2019, he received an honorary doctoral degree from the University of Balamand, in recognition of his significant lifetime achievements as a world-renowned scholar, creative inventor, academician, and eye surgeon.

=== Other notable awards ===
Other notable awards and honors are as follows:
Year	Award	Awarded by
1991	Teacher of the Year Award	Massachusetts Eye and Ear Infirmary
1993	Teacher of the Year Award	The Wilmer Institute, Johns Hopkins University
1996	Resident Teaching Recognition Award	The Wilmer Institute Johns Hopkins University
1994-1996	Top Doctor	Baltimore Magazine, Baltimore, MD
1996	Voted among Top 10 U.S. Refractive Surgeons	Ophthalmology Times
1998	American Academy of Ophthalmology Honor Award	American Academy of Ophthalmology
1999, 2001	Top Doctor, Ophthalmology/ Refractive Surgery	Boston Magazine (Castle Connolly regional database)
2003	Top Doctor, Ophthalmology	Boston Magazine (Castle Connolly regional database)
2004	Senior Achievement Award	American Academy of Ophthalmology
2005	Top 50 Opinion Leaders	Cataract & Refractive Surgery Today
2005	Top 10 Ophthalmologists in Greater Boston area	Boston Herald Supplement
2007	Alcon Research Institute Award	Alcon Research Institute
2005-2010	Best Doctor in America®	www.bestdoctors.com
2006-2016	America's Top Doctor	Castle Connolly national database
2008	Maurice F. Rabb, MD/Jose F. Pulido, MD Medical Student Award	University of Illinois at Chicago
2009	University Scholar Award	University of Illinois at Chicago, Chicago, IL
2010	Silver Fellow, Outstanding service to the eye and vision community	Association of Research in Vision and Ophthalmology
2011	Beta Gamma Sigma Honor Society	University of Chicago Booth School of Business
2013	Jose Barraquer Award	International Society of Refractive Surgery, American Academy of Ophthalmology
2014	Gold Fellow, Outstanding service to the eye and vision community	Association of Research in Vision and Ophthalmology
2016	Ramon Castroviejo Award	Cornea Society
2016	John McLean Medal	Weill Cornell Medical College
2016	Distinguished Service Award	Association of Research in Vision and Ophthalmology
2018	Distinguished Research Achievement Awardee 2018	HMS Department of Ophthalmology Annual Meeting and Alumni Reunion
2019	SAFIR Lecturer, “Intelligence artificielle en ophthalmology.”	SFO, May 11, 2019
2019	Guest of Honor	New England Ophthalmological Society, September 6, 2019
2023	Dastgheib Pioneer Award in Ocular Innovation	Duke University, October 12, 2023
