= Beaufort Longest =

American academic

Beaufort Longest (born circa 1944) is an American academic. He is professor emeritus of health policy and management at the University of Pittsburgh. He was the M. Allen Pond professor and founding director of the Health Policy Institute of the University of Pittsburgh.

== Education ==
He completed his BS from Davidson College in 1965. He completed his PhD from Georgia State University in 1972.

== Career ==
Professor Emeritus Longest received an undergraduate education at Davidson College and received the Master of Health Administration (MHA) and PhD degrees from Georgia State University. He is a life fellow of the American College of Healthcare Executives and held memberships in the Academy of Management, AcademyHealth, American Public Health Association, and the Association for Public Policy Analysis and Management. Professor Emeritus Longest has the unusual distinction of having been elected to membership in the Beta Gamma Sigma Honor Society in Business as well as in the Delta Omega Honor Society in Public Health.

Professor Longest's research on issues of health policy and management has generated substantial grant support and has led to the publication of numerous peer-reviewed articles. In addition, he has authored or co-authored 11 books, and 30 chapters in other books. Two of his books, Managing Health Services Organizations and Systems and Health Policymaking in the United States, are among the most widely used textbooks in graduate health policy and management programs.

He consulted with health care organizations and systems, universities, associations and government agencies on health policy and management issues.

== Selected publications ==
His published books include:

- Health Policymaking in the United States Chicago, Illinois : Health Administration Press; 2016 : Sixth edition, Present in 1723 libraries according to WorldCat
- Health Program Management: From Development Through Evaluation. Jossey-Bass, 2015. 2nd ed.
- Managing Health Services Organizations and Systems, (cowritten with Kurt Darr.) Health Professions Press, 2014., 6th ed.
- Managing Health Programs and Projects. Hoboken: Jossey-Bass, 2011.
- Seeking Strategic Advantage Through Health Policy Analysis Health Administration Press, 1997.
- Health Professionals In Management Appleton & Lange, 1996.* Management Practices For The Health Professional Appleton & Lange, 1990. (4th ed)
- Principles of Hospital Business Office Management. Chicago: Hospital Financial Management Association, 1975.
