= University of Fredericton =

Online University based in Fredricton, New Brunswick

Coordinates: 45.9630°N 66.6431°W

- Motto: Accessible. Affordable. Accredited.
- Type: Private for-profit
- Established: 2005
- Affiliation: non-denominational
- President: Don Roy
- Location: Fredericton, New Brunswick, Canada
- Campus: Online
- Colours: white and red
- Website: www.ufred.ca

The University of Fredericton is a private for-profit online university established in 2005 in Fredericton, New Brunswick. The university's first verified degrees were offered in 2007. It offers MBA, EMBA and Master’s Certificates through its Sandermoen School of Business. The university also offers diploma and certificate programs through its School of Occupational Health, and Safety and Psychological Health and Safety in the Workplace programs.

The university offers its programs through distance learning using live, online classrooms. The University of Fredericton's business programs are validated by the Province of New Brunswick in Canada under section 3 of the provincial Degree Granting Act. The University of Fredericton received accreditation for these programs on April 10, 2007.

On June 13, 2023 it was announced that the University of Fredericton had been acquired by the IU Group, the Owners of the IU International University of Applied Sciences.

== Programs ==
University of Fredericton offers:

- Master of Business Administration (MBA) with specialty tracks in Global Leadership, Innovation Leadership, Social Enterprise Leadership, Real Estate Leadership, Health and Safety Leadership, Human Resource Leadership, Business Analytics Leadership, and Professional Selling and Leadership
- Executive Master of Business Administration (EMBA) with specialty tracks in Global Leadership, Innovation Leadership, Social Enterprise Leadership, Real Estate Leadership, Health and Safety Leadership, Human Resource Leadership, Business Analytics Leadership, and Professional Selling and Leadership
- Pre-MBA

Certificate Programs:

- Master’s Certificates
- Certificate in Health, Safety and Environmental Processes (CHSEP)
- Certificate in Integrated Disability Management
- Certificate in Ergonomics
- Certificate in Psychological Health and Safety in the Workplace (Basic, Manager, Advanced levels)
- Enhancing Workplace Resiliency
- Certificate in Integrated Health and Safety Management

Diploma Programs:

- Diploma in Safety, Health, and Environmental Management (SHEM)
- Diploma in Integrated Disability Management (IDM)

== See also ==
- Higher education in New Brunswick
- List of universities and colleges in New Brunswick
