= Niranjan Pati =

Indian-American academic

Niranjan Pati (born January 30, 1959) is a professor of Management and Entrepreneurship at the Rohrer College of Business, Rowan University, NJ. He was Dean of two AACSB accredited business schools for 11 years, and chair of another business school for four years.

== Early life and education ==
Pati was born and raised in Bhubaneswar, Orissa. He completed his undergraduate education in Production Engineering at Ranchi University with the highest distinction. Afterwards, he obtained his Master's Degree in Industrial Engineering and Operations Research from Indian Institute of Technology, Kharagpur in 1983. After a brief spell of employment in India’s public sector, Pati received his Master's Degree from Northwestern University in 1988 under the guidance of Dr. Wallace J. Hopp. He obtained his doctorate from the same university in 1990. [2] He wrote his dissertation on the “Investment Decision Making in Advanced Manufacturing Systems”. under the guidance of Drs. Donald N. Frey, Dipak C. Jain, Gustave Rath.

== Career ==
Before he entered academia, Pati worked in business and industry in India. He then served as the Chair of the Department of Management in the College of Business Administration at the University of Wisconsin–La Crosse. Pati served as Dean of the School of Business, Indiana University-Kokomo. from 2001 to 2008. He served as the Dean of Rohrer College of Business, Rowan University from 2008 to 2012.

Pati has developed methods of analyzing urban development and economic growth. He is the author of many articles published in refereed manufacturing, business and education-related publications, and is frequently quoted in the media as an expert on business topic.

== Affiliations ==
Pati has been active in the Association to Advance Collegiate Schools of Business (AACSB) International, was a member of its Peace Through Commerce task force and was the founding chair of the New Business School Deans affinity group. He also is the chair of the American Association of State Colleges and Universities affinity group. He is a member of the Beta Gamma Sigma honor society, Institute for Operations Research and Management Sciences, and several civic groups, and has served on the Board of the Chamber of Commerce of South New Jersey (CCSNJ) for 2009-2012.

== Family ==
Pati currently lives in New Jersey with his wife, and three children. He is an avid follower of Cricket, Basketball, Tennis, and Football.
