= Howard M. Fish =

United States Air Force general (1923–2020)

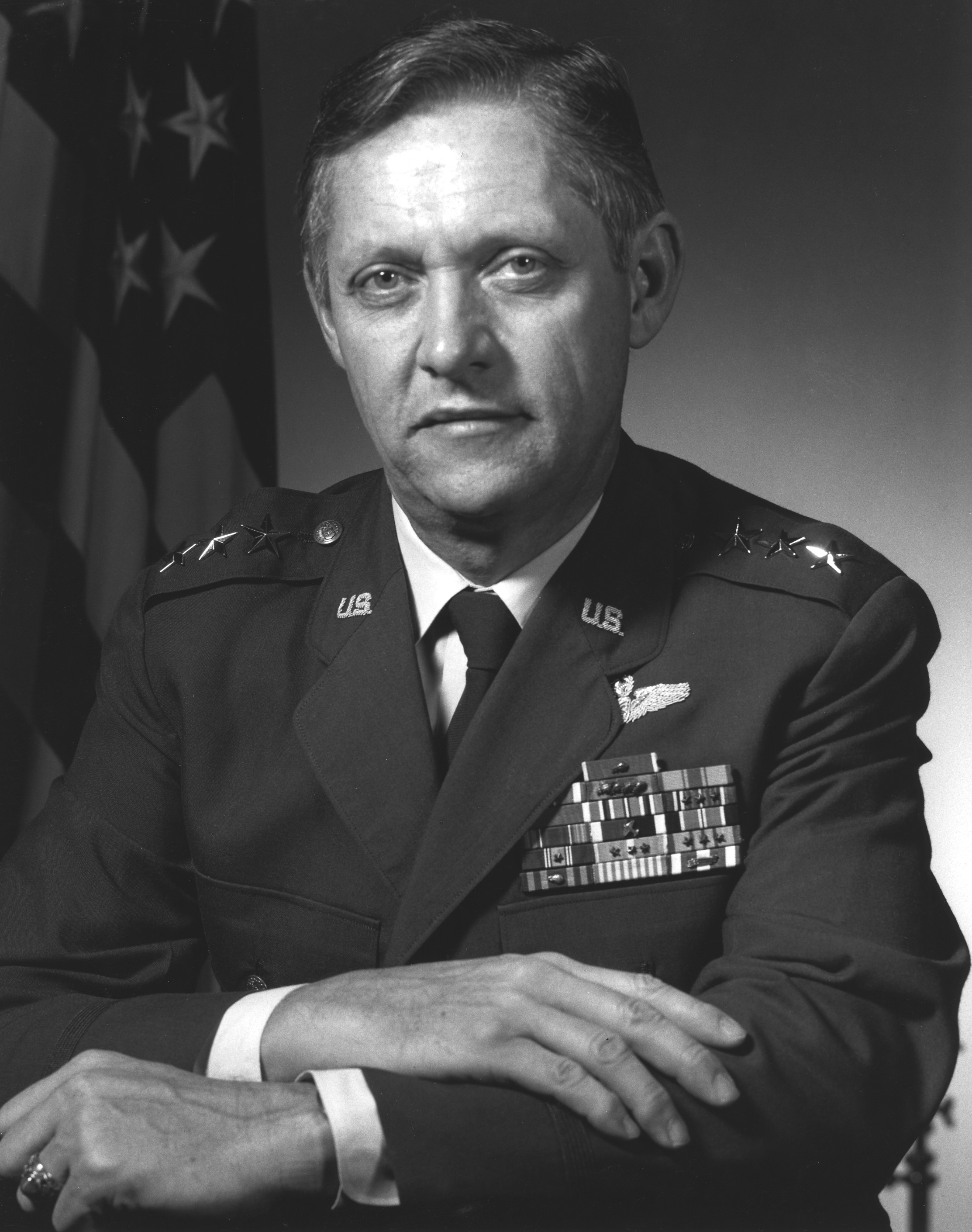
- Born: August 1, 1923; Melrose, Minnesota, US
- Died: April 30, 2020 (aged 96); Tyler, Texas, US
- Military career
- Allegiance: United States of America
- Branch: United States Air Force
- Service years: 1942–1979
- Rank: Lieutenant General
- Commands: Assistant Vice Chief of Staff of the U.S. Air Force
- Awards: Defense Distinguished Service Medal with oak leaf cluster, Legion of Merit with oak leaf cluster, Distinguished Flying Cross with oak leaf cluster, Air Medal with four oak leaf clusters, Air Force Commendation Medal, Purple Heart, American Campaign Medal, European-African-Middle Eastern Campaign Medal, World War II Victory Medal, Army of Occupation Medal with Berlin Airlift device, Medal for Humane Action, National Defense Service Medal with service star, Korean Service Medal, Vietnam Service Medal with four service stars, Air Force Longevity Service Award Ribbon with five oak leaf clusters, United Nations Service Medal, Republic of Vietnam Campaign Medal,

Howard Math Fish (August 1, 1923 – April 30, 2020) was an American Air Force lieutenant general who was the assistant vice chief of staff of the U.S. Air Force and the assistant for readiness and North Atlantic Treaty Organization matters. In addition, he serves as the senior Air Force member, Military Staff Committee, United Nations.

== Biography ==
Fish was born in Melrose, Minnesota, in 1923, and graduated from St. Cloud Cathedral High School, St. Cloud, Minnesota, in June 1941. He entered the Army Air Forces in 1942 and served as an aerial gunner at Tyndall Field, Florida. He began advanced navigator training at Monroe, Louisiana, in November 1943, and received his navigator rating and commission as a second lieutenant in the Army Air Corps in July 1944.

During World War II, from October 1944, Fish served as a navigator in the European theater of operations on a B-17 aircraft crew with the 419th Bombardment Squadron, 301st Bombardment Group in Italy. He was shot down over Vienna, Austria, in February 1945, and spent the remainder of the war as a prisoner of war in Germany.

Fish attended a student navigator refresher course at Ellington Field, Texas, and at Fairfield-Suisun Field, Calif., from November 1945 to February 1946. He then was assigned as assistant statistical control officer, Chanute Field, Ill. In April 1946 he was transferred to Orlando, Florida, for statistical control indoctrination training.

Fish returned to Germany in July 1946 and served as a statistical control officer at Tempelhof and Wiesbaden Air Bases. He also flew in the Berlin Airlift.

He returned to the United States in July 1949 and trained as a navigator-bombardier at Mather Air Force Base, Calif. In April 1950 he was assigned to the 84th Bombardment Squadron at Langley Air Force Base, Va.

In July 1950, during the Korean War, he was transferred to the 162d Tactical Reconnaissance Squadron, which was immediately sent to Korea, where he flew 63 combat missions. Fish later served as a navigator with the aircrew of the commanding general, Eighth Army, in Korea. In March 1951 he was assigned as chief, Program Analysis Section, 374th Troop Carrier Wing, Far Eastern Air Forces.

He returned to Langley Air Force Base in June 1951, to train replacement combat crews for B-26 aircraft units in Korea. Initially, he served as a squadron navigator in the 4400th Combat Crew Training Group and later as a squadron executive officer and group director of operations and training.

In January 1954 Fish entered the Air Command and Staff College, Maxwell Air Force Base, Alabama. Upon graduation, he returned to Langley Air Force Base as executive officer for the 405th Fighter-Bomber Wing. In June 1956 he entered the University of Chicago and graduated in August 1957 with a master's degree in business administration. He became a member of the business scholarship fraternity, Beta Gamma Sigma.

Fish was transferred to Europe in October 1957, serving first as comptroller for the 60th Troop Carrier Wing at Dreux Air Base, France, and then as comptroller, 7310th Air Base Wing, Rhein-Main Air Base, Germany.

In July 1960 he entered the Armed Forces Staff College at Norfolk, Va. After graduation in December 1960, he was assigned as director of data automation, and later become assistant deputy chief of staff, comptroller, Headquarters Eastern Transport Air Force, McGuire Air Force Base, N.J.

In August 1963 he entered the Air War College, Maxwell Air Force Base, Alabama, and while there received a master's degree in international affairs from The George Washington University. In July 1964 he was assigned as a plans and programs officer in the Directorate of Plans, Headquarters U.S. Air Force, Washington, D.C. He was named assistant for analysis to the deputy director of plans for force development in December 1967. In March 1969 he became director of tactical analysis, Seventh Air Force, Ton Son Nhut Air Base, Republic of Vietnam.

Fish returned to Headquarters, United States Air Force in July 1970 as the deputy director of doctrine, concepts and objectives, Deputy Chief of Staff, Plans and Operations. He was appointed deputy director of the budget, Office of the Comptroller, in February 1971 and became director of the budget in October 1973.

In August 1974 Fish became director, Defense Security Assistance Agency, and deputy assistant secretary of defense (international security affairs) for security assistance.

Fish assumed the duties of assistant vice chief of staff of the U.S. Air Force on March 1, 1978. On May 1, 1978, he was assigned additional duties as assistant for readiness and North Atlantic Treaty matters, and as senior Air Force member, Military Staff Committee, United Nations.

His military decorations and awards include the Defense Distinguished Service Medal with oak leaf cluster, Legion of Merit with oak leaf cluster, Distinguished Flying Cross with oak leaf cluster, Air Medal with four oak leaf clusters, Air Force Commendation Medal and Purple Heart. He holds a master navigator rating.

He was promoted to the grade of lieutenant general October 4, 1974, with date of rank October 3, 1974. He retired June 1, 1979 and died on April 30, 2020.
