= Canadian Executive Service Organization =

Canadian charity

The Canadian Executive Service Organization (CESO) is a registered national and international development charity that has operated since 1967. The organization uses Canadian volunteers to work with private and public sectors to accomplish goals within these service areas: strategic planning, business development, accounting and finance, organizational development, community development, governance and production and operations.

CESO's primary funding currently derives from the financial contributions of the Canadian International Development Agency (CIDA), Aboriginal Affairs and Northern Development Canada (AANDC), funders from corporations, foundations and individual donors.

CESO currently has a partnership with the Assembly of First Nations (AFN), agreeing to enhance capacity in First Nations communities.

Wendy Harris is the current CEO of CESO while Peter Chiddy is the current Chair of the Board of Directors.

CESO was founded by several noteworthy Canadians including Maurice Strong, Mitchell Sharp, Paul Martin Sr., Claude Hebert and Cy Peachey

On December 1st, 2022 CESO changed its name to Catalyste+
