= W. Paul Stillman School of Business =

Coordinates: 40.742604°N 74.246217°W

Stillman School of Business
- Type: Private
- Established: 1950
- Parent institution: Seton Hall University
- Dean: Joyce Strawser
- Undergraduates: 891
- Postgraduates: 165
- Location: South Orange, New Jersey
- Website: www.shu/business

The W. Paul Stillman School of Business is a post-secondary degree-granting institution concentrating in business within Seton Hall University in South Orange, New Jersey. It educates both undergraduate and graduate students. The W. Paul Stillman School of Business is accredited by the AACSB and is the only school in northern New Jersey to be accredited for both accounting and business.

== History ==
The Stillman School was founded in 1950 and welcomed its first class in the Fall of 1950, when it also granted its first baccalaureate. The school's namesake is W. Paul Stillman (1897–1989), deceased banker and insurance executive. Mr. Stillman received six honorary degrees and led several banking and insurance companies. He was former chairman and chief executive of First National State Bank, one of New Jersey's largest; a director of its successor, First Fidelity Bank, and honorary chairman and life director of First Fidelity Bancorporation. In 1938, he was named to the board of directors of the Mutual Benefit Life Insurance Company and in 1946 became its chairman and chief executive. The bank, insurance company, and himself provided a combined $1 million gift to Seton Hall University in 1973 to found the W. Paul Stillman School of Business Administration.

== Degree programs ==
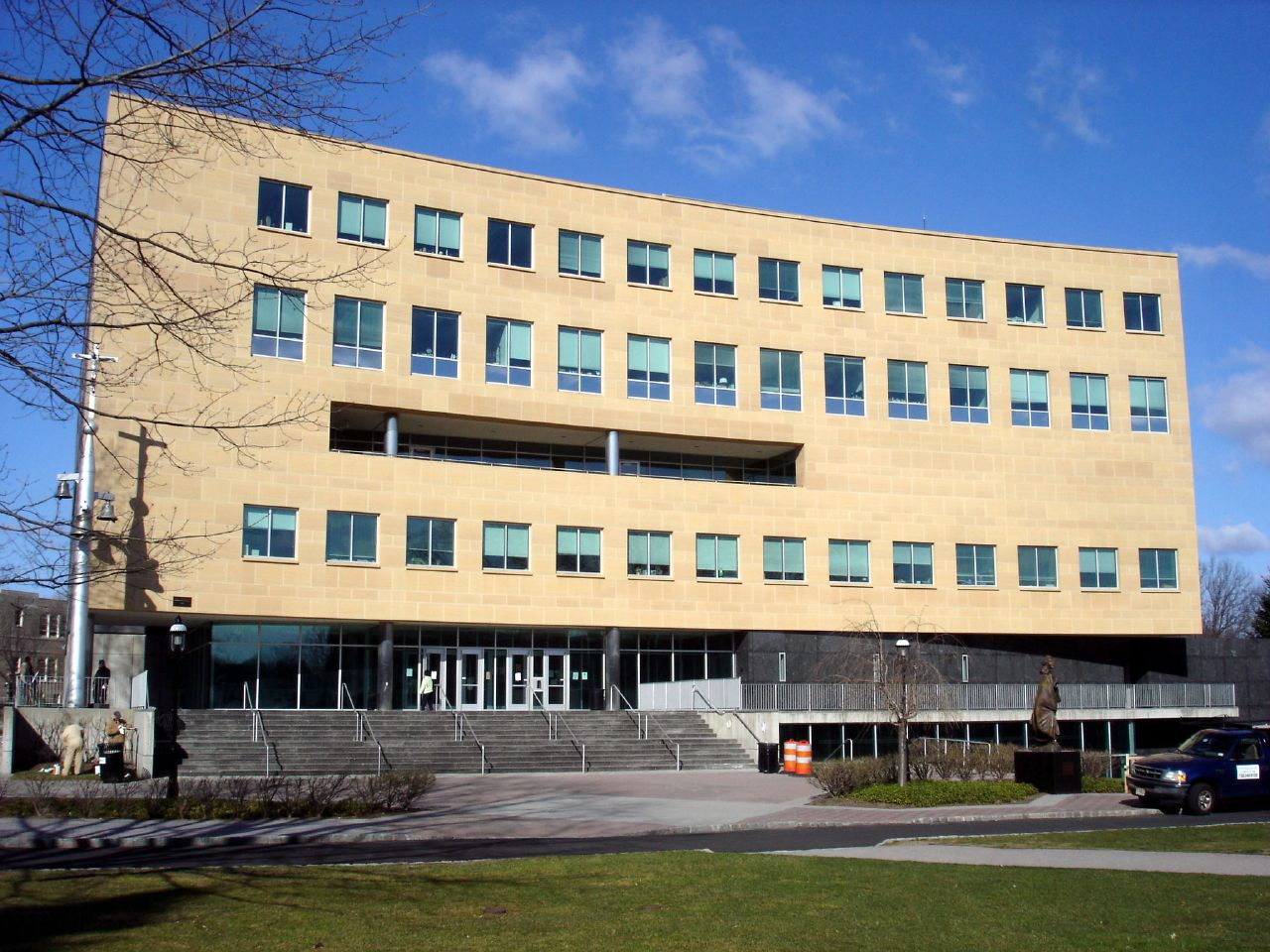
Jubilee Hall on the South Orange, NJ campus of Seton Hall University, is the home of the Stillman School of Business.

The Stillman School offers both undergraduate and graduate degrees, a Bachelor of Science and Master of Science, and Master of Business Administration. In addition to these degrees offerings, the school also offers several dual degree programs in collaboration with other institutions of the university. These include:

- MBA/MA in Diplomacy and International Relations in conjunction with the School of Diplomacy
- MBA/JD in conjunction with the School of Law

The undergraduate program working towards a Baccalaureate degree in Business is an intensive program which includes 45 credits of business core curriculum and a 15-24 credit concentration. Students take a wide range of courses in technology, history, economics, and ethics. Concentrations include:

- Accounting
- Economics
- Finance
- Management Information Systems
- Management
- Marketing
- Sports Management

== Leadership Honors Program ==
The Leadership Honors Program at Stillman is offered to a small select group of undergraduates admissions. Approximately twenty incoming Stillman Students are accepted each year on a competitive basis. Requisite skills include outstanding academic service, extra curricular activities and prior demonstration of leadership roles in high school and community clubs, organizations, and sports. Leadership students have distinct course requirements in addition to the normal business curriculum. Each class of leadership students attends many first and second year courses as a group. There is a community service requirement in addition to the overall University service requirement. Leadership students are afforded unique international travel opportunities and participation in executive mentoring programs.

== Stillman Exchange ==
The Stillman Exchange is produced by W. Paul Stillman School of Business students. The publication boasts a staff of nearly fifty writers and is the first undergraduate business publication in the United States.

== Rankings ==
In a published report by BusinessWeek of the Best Business Schools in America, the W. Paul Stillman School of Business is ranked within the top 100 business school.

== Deans ==
- Ed Mazze, July 1975 to June 1979
- John J. Hampton, 1983-1987
- John H. Shannon, 1994 to 1997
- Karen Boroff, 2007 - May 2010
- Joyce Strawser, May 2010 to present

== Notable alumni ==
- Orin R. Smith (M.B.A., 1964), former chairman and CEO of Engelhard Corporation
