= HHL Leipzig Graduate School of Management =

Private business school based in Saxony, Germany

Coordinates: 51°20′23″N 12°20′59″E

- Type: Private
- Established: 1898 re-established 1992
- Chancellor: Dr. Hiltrud Ludwig
- Dean: Prof. Dr. Tobias Dauth
- Location: Jahnallee 59, 04109 Leipzig, Germany, Leipzig, Saxony, Germany
- Website: www.hhl.de

HHL Leipzig Graduate School of Management, formerly known as Handelshochschule Leipzig, is a private business school based in Saxony, Germany. Established in 1898, it is one of the world's oldest business schools. The school is accredited internationally by AACSB and locally by ACQUIN. HHL Leipzig graduate school of management is authorized to award doctoral and postdoctoral degrees.

== History ==
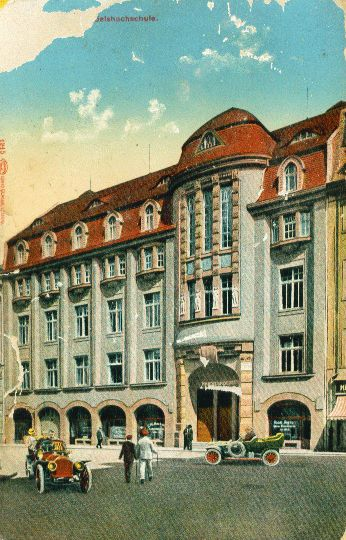
Historical building of the Handelshochschule Leipzig, built in 1910 at Ritterstrasse. Today it is part of the Leipzig University as Geschwister-Scholl-Haus.

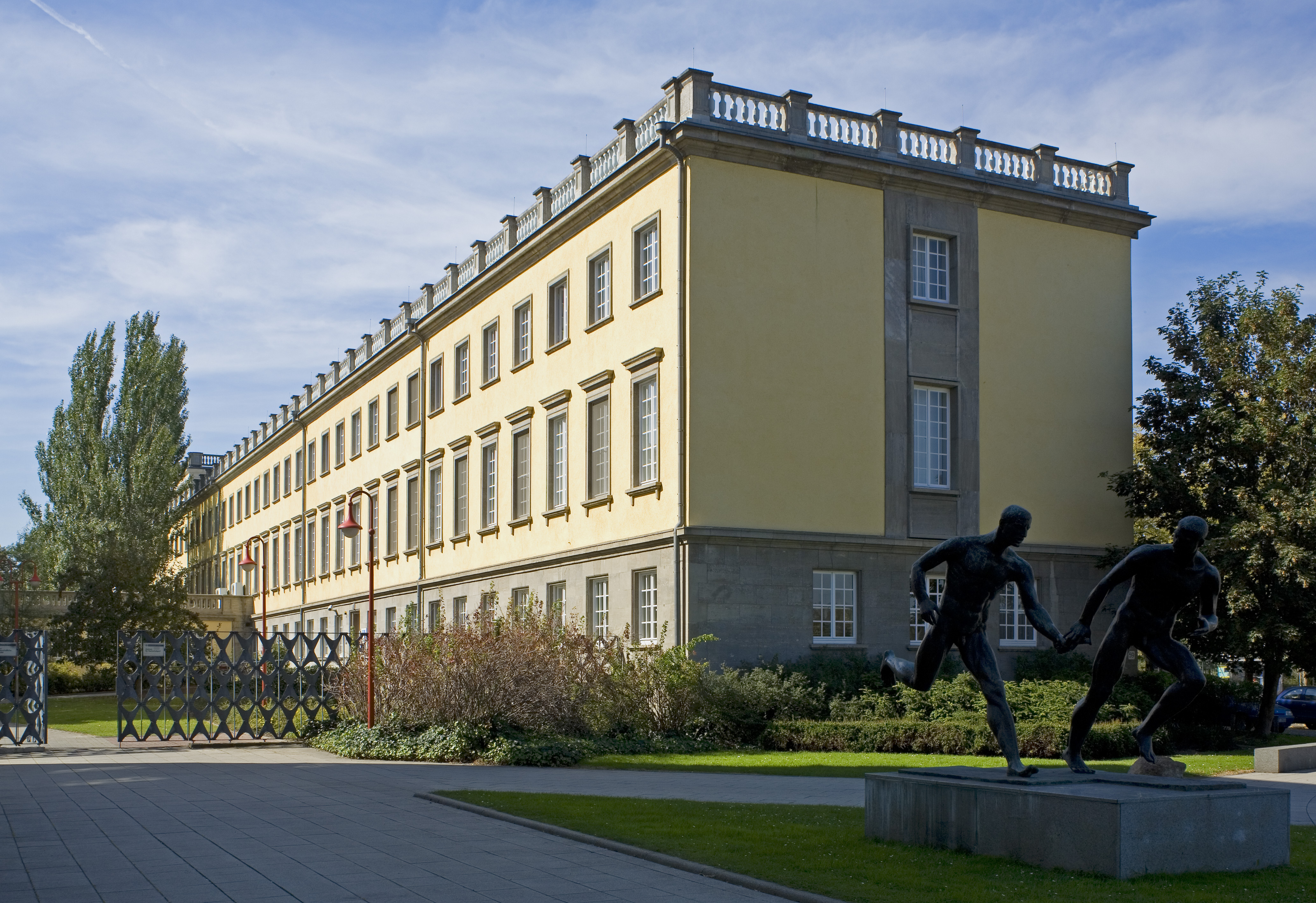
Today: HHL Leipzig Graduate School of Management, University House at Jahnallee 59.

The school was founded in 1898 upon an initiative by the Leipzig Chamber of Commerce. In 1946, it was integrated into Leipzig University and regained partial independence in 1969. After the Fall of the Iron Curtain and the reunification of Germany, the school was re-founded under private management in 1992, again, through an initiative of the Leipzig Chamber of Commerce.

== Ranking ==
Rankings of Individual HHL Programs

Master in Management

- Ranked 5th in Germany, 42nd worldwide in the Financial Times Global Masters in Management Ranking 2026
- "Salary after graduation" category: Ranked 3rd in Europe
- "Alumni network" category: Ranked 4th in Europe
- "Career service" category: Ranked 5th in Europe

Master of Business Administration

The MBA program at HHL Leipzig Graduate School of Management achieves 62.6 out of 100 points in this category, placing it above the global average of 57.7 points.

== Study Programs ==
=== Master in Business Administration ===
- Full-time MBA
- Full-time MBA | Finance
- Full-time MBA | AI
- Part-time MBA

=== Master of Science (M.Sc.) ===
- Full-time Master in Management
- Full-time Master in Management | Finance
- Full-time Master in Management | Strategy and Business Consulting
- Part-time Master in Management
- Part-time Master in Management | Finance
- Master in Entrepreneurship
- Master in Finance

=== Doctoral Program ===
The doctoral program is for candidates who hold a secondary university degree. Within three years, the candidate participates in lectures, courses, a research colloquium and conferences. After successfully completing all requirements and acceptance of the doctoral thesis, the candidate is awarded the degree Dr. rer.oec.

== The Leipzig Leadership Model ==
The Leipzig Leadership Model (LLM) is an interdisciplinary and multidimensional framework for good leadership developed at HHL Leipzig Graduate School of Management in 2016. The LLM uses its four dimensions (purpose, entrepreneurial spirit, effectiveness and responsibility) to link important questions of meaning and values with the strategic and operational tasks of entrepreneurial activity. The four dimensions can be applied using key questions and guide reflection:

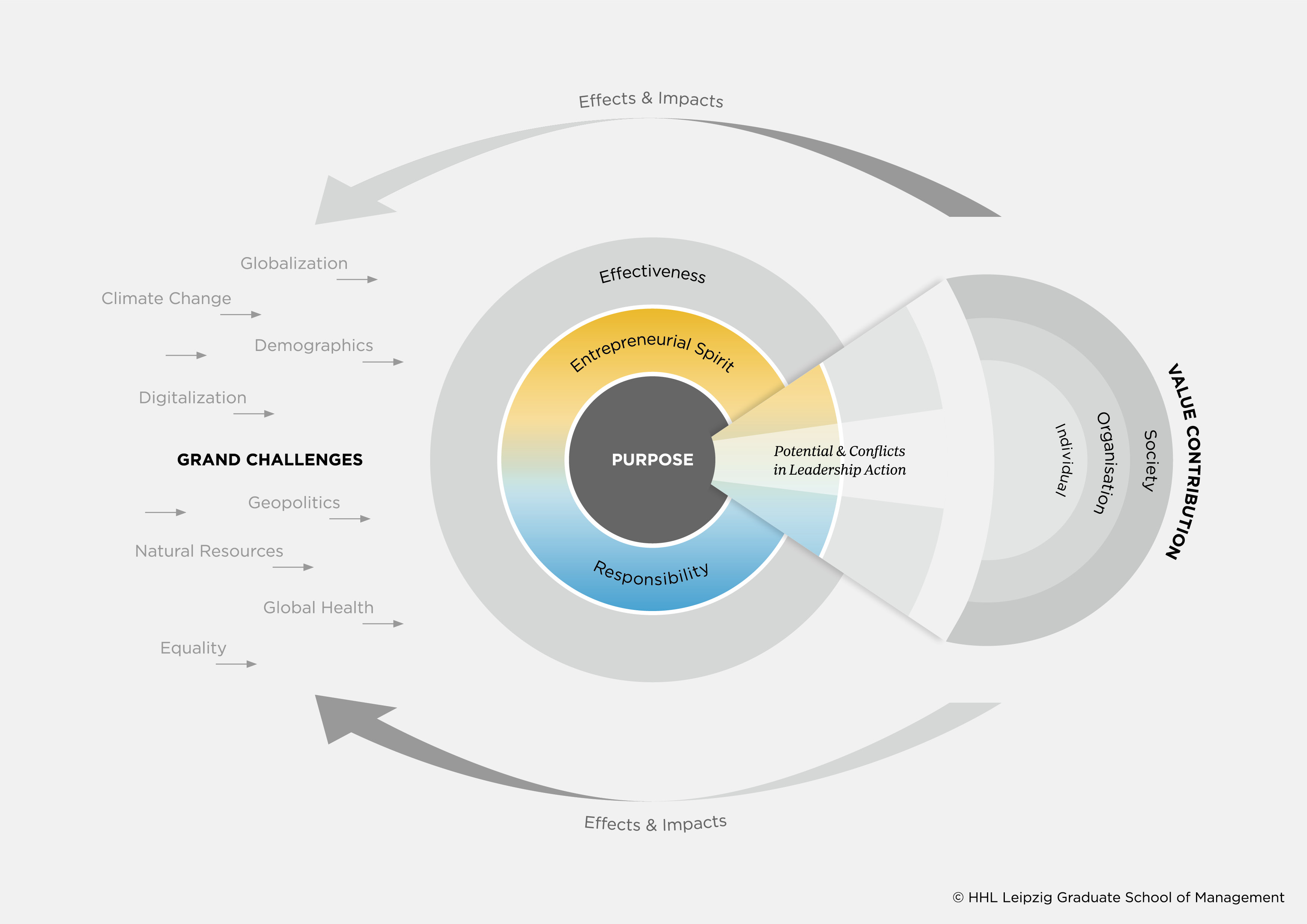
Extended Leipzig Leadership Model

- Are we pursuing an overarching goal? (Purpose)

- Do we think and act entrepreneurially? (entrepreneurial spirit)

- Are our actions legitimate? (Responsibility)

- Are we effective? (Effectiveness)

Without prescribing specific instructions for action, the LLM offers orientation in order to remain capable of acting as an organization or manager in a fundamentally uncontrollable world and to develop an attitude according to which the manager sees her/himself as part of a larger whole and defines her/himself through a value contribution and not through status, knowledge or power.

In 2022 an extended version was published in which systemic interactions between entrepreneurial activity and grand challenges are given greater prominence.

In 2023, a psychometric procedure ("Leipzig Leadership Profile") was presented, with the help of which individual leadership orientations are measured in the four model dimensions. This is used in teaching and in the "New Leipzig Talents" competency coaching program.

== Partner Universities ==
The school maintains a network of more than 120 partner universities worldwide.

- Imperial College Business School, Imperial College London
- Booth School of Business, University of Chicago
- Tuck School of Business, Dartmouth College
- Goizueta Business School, Emory University
- Baruch College, City University of New York
- Freeman School of Business, Tulane University
- EADA Business School
- Nanyang Business School, Nanyang Technological University
- Indian Institute of Management Udaipur
- Norwegian School of Management
- Guanghua School of Management, Beijing University
- Lingnan (University) College, Sun Yat-sen University
- Indian Institute of Management
- Asian Institute of Technology, Thailand
- Shanghai Jiao Tong University, China
- National Chengchi University, Taiwan
- NUCB Business School, Japan

== Honorary doctors, senators and professors ==
- Heribert Meffert
- Michael Spence
- Wendelin Wiedeking
- Michael E. Porter
- Philip Kotler
- Kurt Biedenkopf
- Bernhard Walter
- Burkhard Schwenker
- Hans Werner Sinn
- Gerhard Casper
- Jürgen F. Strube
- Stefan H. Thomke
- Arend Oetker
- Horst Albach
- Ludwig Trippen (†)
- Joseph A. Maciarello
- Angela Merkel

== Professors and alumni ==
- Karl von der Aa
- Abraham Adler
- Hermann Großmann
- Timo Meynhardt
- Balduin Penndorf
- Eugen Schmalenbach
- Rudolf Seyffert
- Franz Koch
- Arnis Vilks

== Literature ==
100 Jahre Handelshochschule Leipzig 1898–1998. Festschrift anlässlich des 100-jährigen Gründungsjubiläums der Handelshochschule Leipzig am 25. April 1998; Published by: Handelshochschule Leipzig.
