= Higher education in Ontario =

Colleges and universities in Ontario, Canada

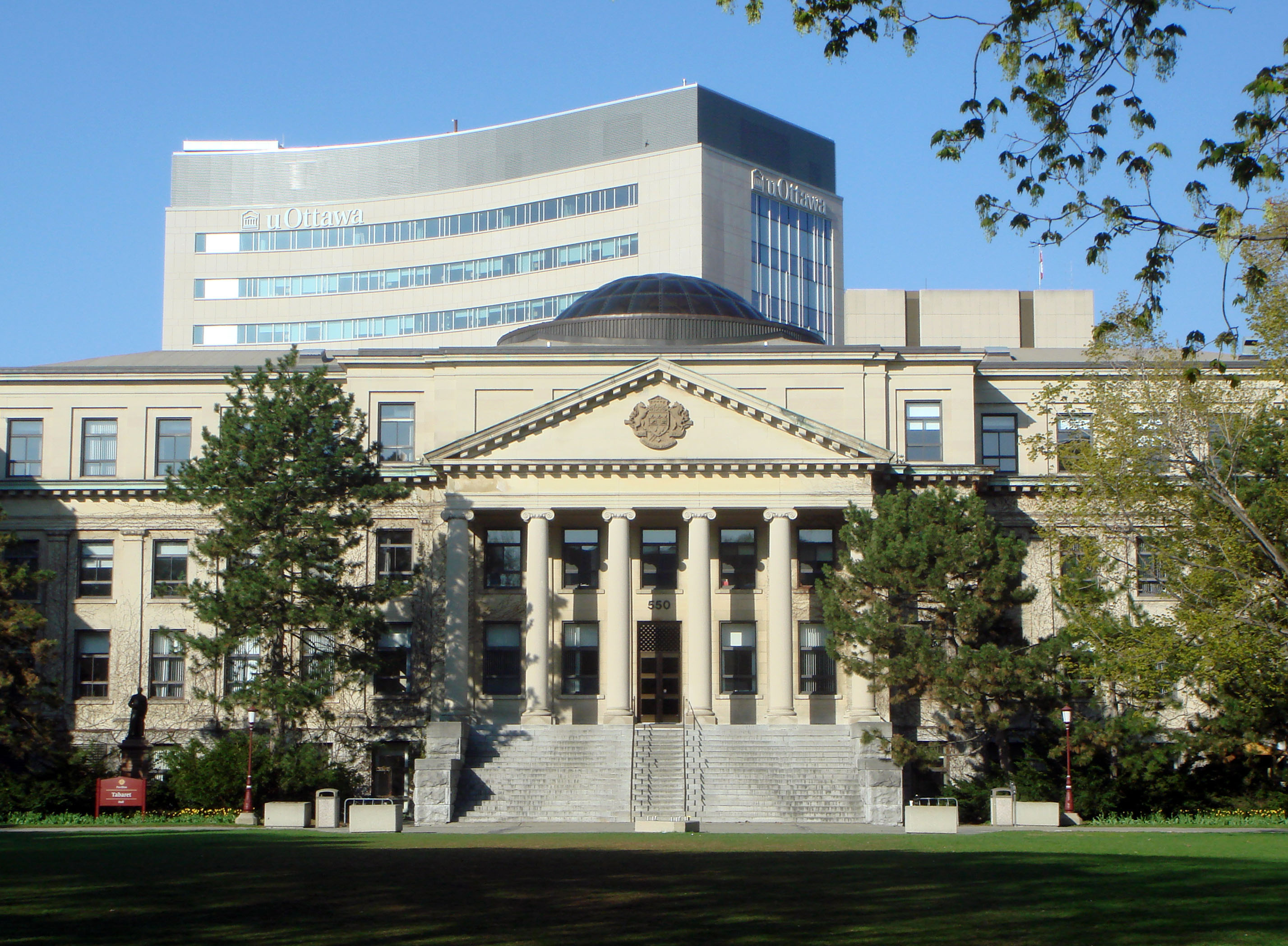
University of Ottawa, Tabaret Hall

Higher education in Ontario includes postsecondary education and skills training regulated by the Ministry of Colleges and Universities and provided by universities, colleges of applied arts and technology, and private career colleges. The current minister is Jill Dunlop who was appointed in June 2021. The ministry administers laws covering 22 public universities, 24 public colleges (21 Colleges of Applied Arts and Technology (CAATs) and three Institutes of Technology and Advanced Learning (ITALs)), 17 privately funded religious universities, and over 500 private career colleges. 18 of the top 50 research universities in Canada are in Ontario.

The Constitution of Canada provides each province with the responsibility for higher education; there is no corresponding federal ministry of higher education. Within Canadian federalism the division of responsibilities and taxing powers between the Ontario and Canadian governments creates the need for cooperation to fund and deliver higher education to students. Each higher education system aims to improve participation, access, and mobility for students. There are two central organizations that assist with the process of applying to Ontario universities and colleges: the Ontario Universities' Application Centre and Ontario College Application Service. While application services are centralized, admission and selection processes vary and are the purview of each institution independently. Admission to many Ontario postsecondary institutions can be highly competitive. Post-secondary students in Ontario are typically represented by student unions affiliated with one of several provincial or national student associations.

== History ==
=== Pre-confederation, 1791–1866 ===
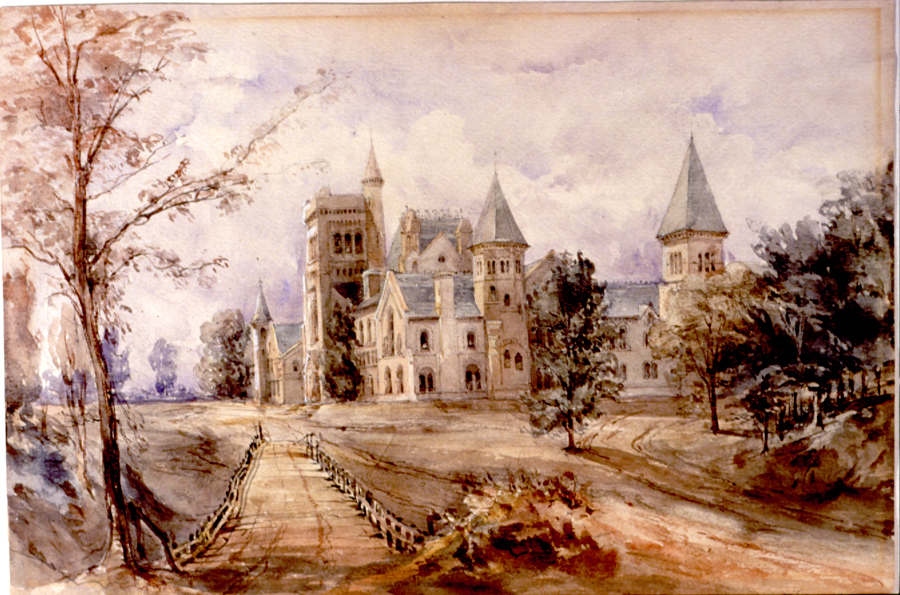
Sir Edmund Walker's 1859 painting of University College

The Constitutional Act of 1791 by the British House of Commons divided the old province of Quebec into two British colonies. The western colony became Upper Canada with John Graves Simcoe as its first head of state by fulfilling the role of Lieutenant Governor. Governor Simcoe was the first advocate for establishing educational institutions in the new colony to increase citizens' connection to Britain and prevent the incursion of influence from post-revolutionary schools in the United States. In 1797, the Duke of Portland agreed, on behalf of the British King, to the request from the Legislative Council and House of Assembly of Upper Canada for a portion of Crown Land to support the foundation of grammar schools and a college or university. Higher education preceded Canadian Confederation with the establishment of private and sectarian universities in Ontario during the early 19th century. Initially, Ontario's first three universities were formed with religious affiliations.

Established in 1827, King's College was associated with the Church of England through its first president John Strachan, which was later secularized by the government of Upper Canada to become the University of Toronto. The Presbyterian Church established Queen's College in 1841. In addition, the Roman Catholic Missionary Oblates of Mary Immaculate established the College of Bytown in 1848. In 1866, the College of Bytown completed its conversion to the University of Ottawa through incorporation by Royal charter from the government in London, England. In 1912, Queen's College ended its affiliation with the Presbyterian Church and became Queen's University.

=== Post-confederation, 1867–1899 ===
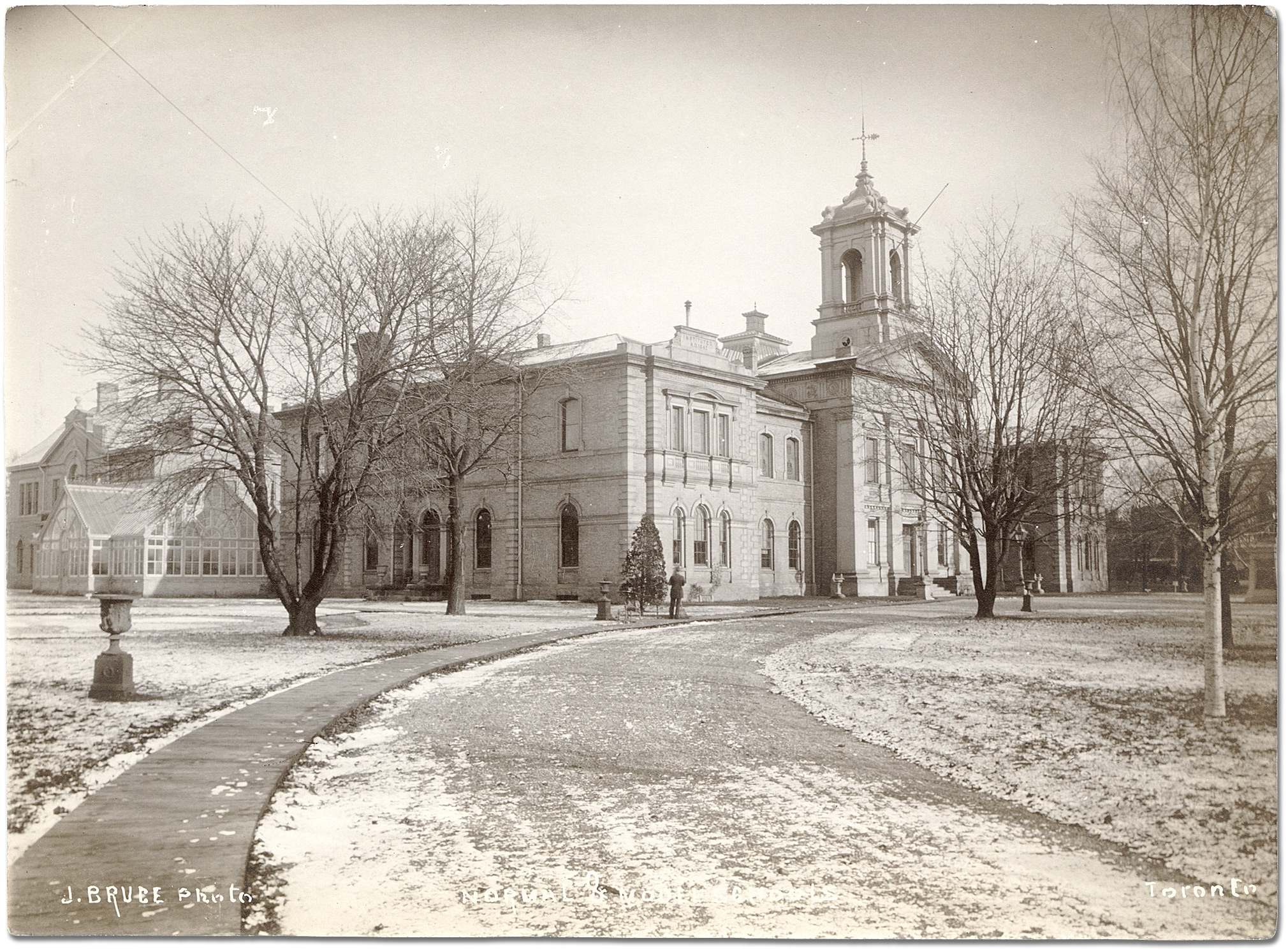
Toronto Normal School c. 1890

In 1867, section 91 of the Canadian constitution established that the government of Canada has responsibility for trade and commerce whereas section 93 conferred to each province responsibility for education. Higher education in Canada reflects this division of powers in Canadian federalism through the overlapping of interests and responsibilities between the provinces and the federal presence in higher education in Canada. In 1868, the province of Ontario withdrew financial support for religious universities. In 1874, the Canadian government established the first federal institution of higher education in Kingston, Ontario, the Royal Military College of Canada.

In 1876, the Ontario Society of Artists founded the forerunner to the Ontario College of Art & Design at the Toronto Normal School. In 1878, Bishop Isaac Hellmuth founded the "Western University of London" with religious affiliation to the Anglican Diocese of Huron and later the institution became the non-denominational University of Western Ontario. In 1887, William McMaster founded McMaster University by merging Toronto Baptist College and Woodstock College. By 1899, there were seven higher education institutions established in Ontario.

=== Early 20th century, 1900–1945 ===
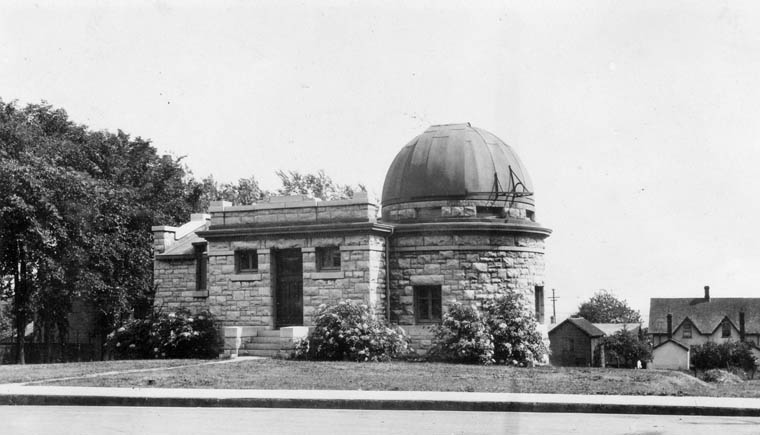
The observatory at Queen's University c. 1923

In 1900, the Dominican Order established the Dominican College of Philosophy and Theology that later became the Dominican University College. In 1906, controversy over the role of the Ontario government and the leadership of the University of Toronto led to the Flavelle commission that articulated a separation of powers, resulting in the widespread adoption of the bicameral model for university governance in Canada. In 1911, the Evangelical Lutheran Church in Canada founded the Waterloo Lutheran Seminary that was associated with the development of the University of Waterloo and Wilfrid Laurier University.

Higher education was a low-priority under the provincial government of Mitchell Hepburn due to the effects of the Depression but universities supported the national war effort through funding from the government of Canada. In 1942, the Ottawa Association for the Advancement of Learning established the non-denominational Carleton College that later became Carleton University. By 1945, there were three publicly supported secular universities, six denominational private colleges, and several vocational institutes.

Percentage of population aged 20 to 24 enrolled in school	1921	1931	1941	1951	1961
Ontario	3.9	4.5	4.7	7.1	12.6

=== Late 20th century, 1946–1999 ===
In 1946, the government of Ontario established the Lakehead Technical Institute in Port Arthur (now Thunder Bay) that later became Lakehead University. In 1948, Howard Hillen Kerr persuaded the government of Ontario to turn the Training and Re-Establishment Institute for veterans into the Ryerson Institute of Technology. Over the following forty-five years, the institute expanded its vocational focus to become Ryerson University (now Toronto Metropolitan University).

In 1951, the provincial government hired a part-time consultant on higher education policy matters to support the Minister of Education given that no office in the government or agency had ever had full responsibility for the sector. In 1956, Premier Leslie Frost replaced the consultant with a committee of senior government officials who served two years before being replaced by civil servants from the government departments of economics, education and treasury who made up the University Committee. In 1957, Gerry Hagey, Ira Needles, and Rev. Cornelius Siegfried founded the Waterloo College Associate Faculties that later became the University of Waterloo. In 1959, the government of Ontario established York University and Murray Ross served as the founding president. By 1960, there were five publicly supported secular universities. In 1960, the government of Ontario established Laurentian University as a bilingual federation representing Roman Catholic, United, and Anglican religious affiliations. In 1961, the government expanded and changed the University Committee into an Advisory Committee on University Affairs consisting of civil servants and non-government members.

In 1962, the government of Ontario formed the University of Windsor as part of turning Assumption University into a federated institution. By 1963, Ontario's post-secondary system consisted of 14 universities (with 35,000 full-time undergraduate students), seven institutes of technology (with just over 4,000 students), 11 teachers colleges, almost 60 hospital schools of nursing, and the Ontario College of Art. In 1964, the government introduced a Department of University Affairs within the Ministry of Education under Minister Bill Davis. In the same year, the provincial government founded Brock University named after Sir Isaac Brock, the University of Guelph through integrating three institutions, and Trent University. In the mid-1960s, the government of Ontario passed legislation to establish a new category of post-secondary institutions called Colleges of Applied Arts and Technology (CAATS) with an emphasis on vocational, technological, and general education.

In 1966, the provincial government began to establish an applied arts college system with the Centennial College of Applied Arts and Technology as the first college. In 1967, the government of Ontario established twenty-three more CAATs. The universities retained a monopoly over the right to grant degrees and the government defined clear non-degree granting mandates for the CAATs thereby creating a binary system of higher education within Ontario. Also in 1967, the government of Ontario responded to citizens' interest to form Algoma College which became a university in 2008. In addition, the government formed Nipissing College in affiliation with Laurentian University. In 1992, the provincial government converted Nipissing College into Nipissing University. The 1995 Ontario general election provided a large majority for the new Mike Harris government. After 1995, the provincial government undertook actions that led to increased privatization within higher education, blurred boundaries in the binary structure, institutional differentiation, and the overall system's expansion. In 1996, the Ontario Ministry of Education and Training released the first review of higher education as a system.

=== Early twenty-first century, 2000–present ===
By 2000, there were a total of twenty public universities established in Ontario. In 2002, the government of Ontario created the University of Ontario Institute of Technology to increase supply and address a change in the Ontario Academic Credit system that created a double cohort of students entering post-secondary education. In 2005, the Honourable Bob Rae released a comprehensive review of postsecondary education entitled Ontario: A leader in learning, more commonly known as the Rae Report or Rae Review. Within four months of its release, the provincial government of Premier Dalton McGuinty implemented an investment plan for postsecondary education called "Reaching Higher" outlining its strategy until 2010. As part of this plan, the provincial government accepted a recommendation of the Rae Report to establish the Higher Education Quality Council of Ontario as an independent advisory agency. On June 18, 2008, the provincial government converted Algoma University College into Algoma University.

In 2000, the Ministry of Advanced Education and Skills Development authorized Ontario's Colleges of Applied Arts and Technology (CAATs) to offer a limited number of applied baccalaureate degrees under the Postsecondary Education Choice and Excellence Act, 2000.

=== Ontario Provincial Government and Postsecondary education, 1943–present ===
Timeframe	Duration	Political Party	Party Leader(s)	Major Reports on Higher education
1943–1985	42 years	Progressive Conservative	George Drew, Leslie Frost, John Robarts, William Davis	The Learning Society. Report of the Commission on Post-Secondary Education in Ontario, 1972
1943–1985	42 years	Progressive Conservative	George Drew, Leslie Frost, John Robarts, William Davis	Growth in Ontario Colleges of Applied Arts and Technology. Report of the Minister's Taskforce on College Growth, 1981
1943–1985	42 years	Progressive Conservative	George Drew, Leslie Frost, John Robarts, William Davis	Report of the Committee on the Future Role of Universities in Ontario. Ministry of Colleges and Universities, 1981
1943–1985	42 years	Progressive Conservative	George Drew, Leslie Frost, John Robarts, William Davis	Ontario Universities: Options and Futures. Commission on the Future Development of the Universities of Ontario, 1984
1985–1990	5 years	Liberal	David Peterson	Report of the Advisor to the Minister of Colleges and Universities on the Governance of the Colleges of Applied Arts and Technology. Walter Pitman, 1986
1990–1995	5 years	NDP	Bob Rae	Vision 2000: Quality and Opportunity. Ontario Council of Regents for Colleges of Applied Arts and Technology, 1990
1990–1995	5 years	NDP	Bob Rae	University Accountability: A Strengthened Framework. Task Force on University Accountability, 1993
1990–1995	5 years	NDP	Bob Rae	For the Love of Learning. Royal Commission on Learning, 1994
1995–2003	8 years	Progressive Conservative	Mike Harris	Excellence Accessibility Responsibility. Report of the Advisory Panel on Future Directions for Postsecondary Education, 1996
2003– 2018	15 years	Liberal	Dalton McGuinty, Kathleen Wynne	Ontario: A Leader in Learning (The Rae Report). Bob Rae, 2005 Ontario's differentiation policy framework for postsecondary education. Ontario Ministry of Training, Colleges and Universities, 2013.
2018- Present	6 years to date	Progressive Conservative	Doug Ford	

== Governance ==
Ontario

The higher education system in Ontario includes the interaction among government, external advisory bodies, educational institutions, and associations. The Canadian constitution allocates responsibility for higher education to the provinces. In Ontario, executive responsibility lies with the Minister of Colleges and Universities, who is a member of the Executive Council of Ontario (or cabinet) headed by the Premier and accountable to the Legislative Assembly of Ontario. The Minister through the Deputy Minister manages the operations of the Ministry that has responsibility for administration of laws relating to postsecondary education and skills training in Ontario. The Ministry of Colleges and Universities also works with several external advisory bodies to assist the governance of the higher education system in Ontario.

Governance within Ontario universities generally follows a bicameral approach with separation of authority between a board and senate.

== Structure ==
Ontario has a binary public post-secondary education structure consisting of parallel college and university systems. The public college system comprises 21 colleges of applied arts and technology and three institutes of technology and advanced learning. The public university system comprises twenty-two universities. Some universities have federated and/or affiliated colleges which are considered part of the public university system. In addition, there are seventeen private religious universities and over 500 private career colleges that are not classified as universities. Ontario's private career colleges provide specific skills training for employment and must be registered with the Ministry of Advanced Education and Skills Development. Post-secondary college diploma programs in applied health and human services incorporate mandatory supervised practicum and clinical hours aligned with provincial regulatory standards.

== Associations and organizations ==
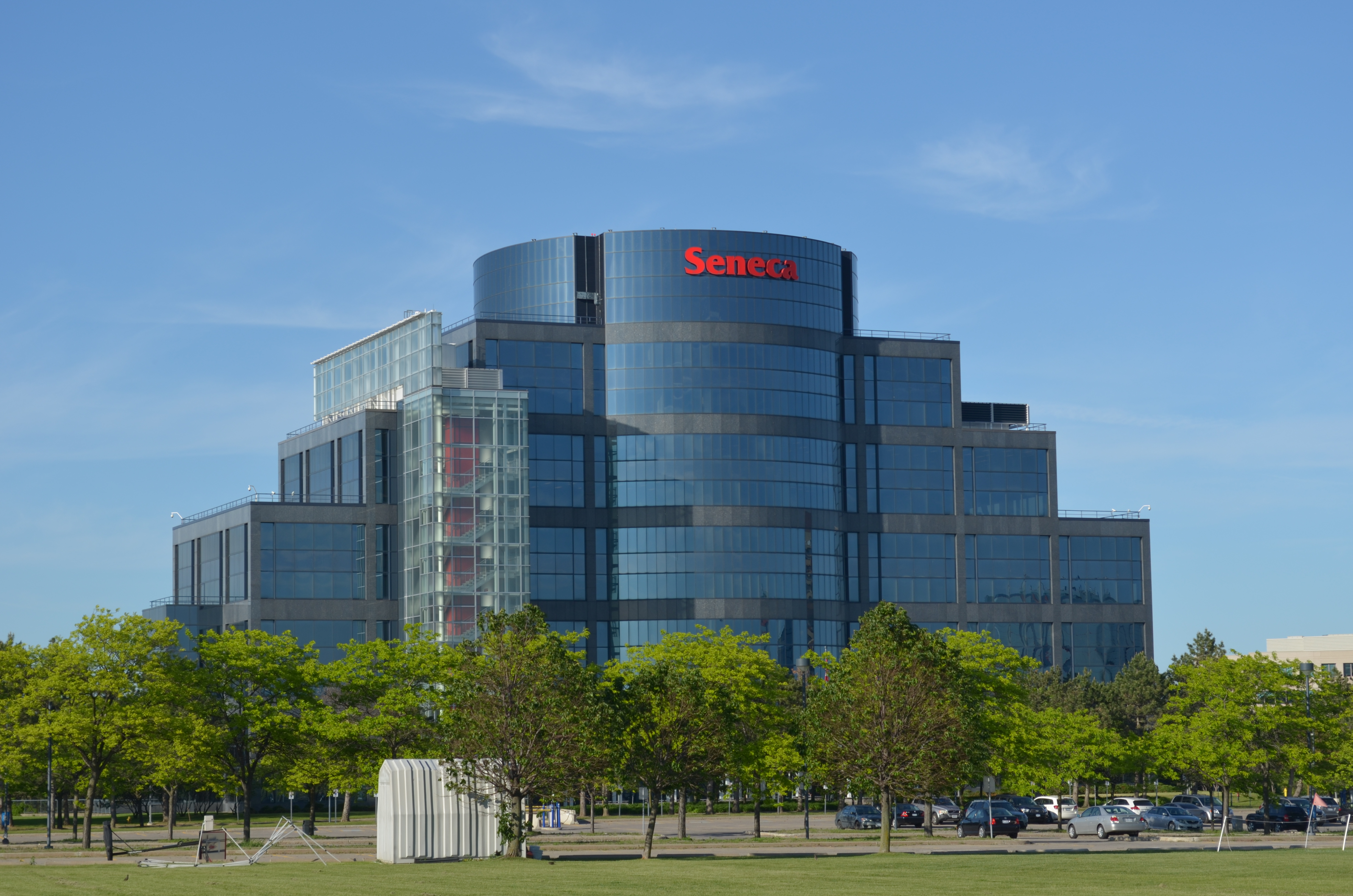
Markham campus of Seneca College

There are eight associations in Ontario that provide representation for faculty, staff, institutions, and students by interacting within the structure of higher education in Ontario.

=== Institutional associations ===
- Established in 1962, the Council of Ontario Universities (COU) represents twenty degree-granting institutions through a committee consisting of one executive and one academic from each member institution. The COU supports a wide range of activities regarding issues to enhance the role of universities (e.g., Council & Committees) and collaboration between institutions to increase effectiveness (e.g., sharing information through Common University Data Ontario).
- Colleges Ontario is the advocacy and outreach association of Ontario's 24 Colleges of Applied Arts and Technology (including three Institutes of Technology and Advanced Learning).

=== Faculty associations ===
- Established in 1964, the Ontario Confederation of University Faculty Associations (OCUFA) represents 15,000 teachers, researchers, and librarians through its interaction with the Ontario government, opposition parties, related agencies, and associations. OCUFA allows its twenty-three member faculty associations to coordinate media relations and research for collective bargaining. In addition, OCUFA publishes the quarterly journal Academic Matters, the monthly electronic newsletter Ontario University Report, and provides research briefs and reports on its website. For advocacy, OCUFA has a separate website entitled Quality Matters.
- Established in 1974, the Confederation of Ontario University Staff Associations & Unions (COUSA) represents non-union and union non-academic staff by providing a forum to share information, workshops, a common lobbying voice, and a method for collective action. In addition, COUSA participates in a Coalition for Post-Secondary Education that includes the Ontario Public Service Employees Union and related higher education associations.

=== Student associations ===
- Established in 1975, the College Student Alliance (CSA) represents 109,000 students across twenty student associations at colleges in Ontario. The CSA focuses on developing its members and advocacy on issues for students at college and college-university institutions.
- Established in 1981, the Canadian Federation of Students Ontario represents 300,000 students across thirty-five student unions in Ontario. The federation focuses on advocacy through effective research, lobbying, and student mobilization.
- Established in 1992, the Ontario Undergraduate Student Alliance represents 155,000 students at eight Ontario higher education institutions. The alliance focuses on higher education issues related to accessibility, affordability, accountability and quality.
- Established in 1995, the Canadian Alliance of Student Associations (CASA) represents 275,000 students across Canada and one student association in Ontario.
- Established in 2015, the Undergraduates of Canadian Research Intensive Universities (UCRU) represents 250,000 students across Canada and five student associations in Ontario. Membership in the UCRU is open to student associations that represent undergraduate students at a university in the U15 Group of Canadian Research Universities.

=== Centralized organizations ===
- Founded in 2005 the Higher Education Quality Council of Ontario (HEQCO) is an independent agency funded by the Ministry of Advanced Education and Skills Development and provides recommendations to enhance access, quality and accountability of Ontario's colleges and universities.
- Founded in 1971 the Ontario Universities' Application Centre (OUAC) is an organization acting as a bureau managing applications to universities in Ontario.
- Ontario College Application Service (OCAS) is a corporation created by the Colleges of Applied Arts and Technology in Ontario. It provides a centralized application system for prospective students.
- Ontario Council on Articulation and Transfer (ONCAT) traces its roots to the College University Consortium Council (CUCC) which was established in 1996. ONCAT was founded in 2011. It is a coordinating body to develop and maintain a new transfer portal and transfer guide. The purpose is to assist students to transfer between institutions and research and report on credit transfer activity and results.

== Funding ==
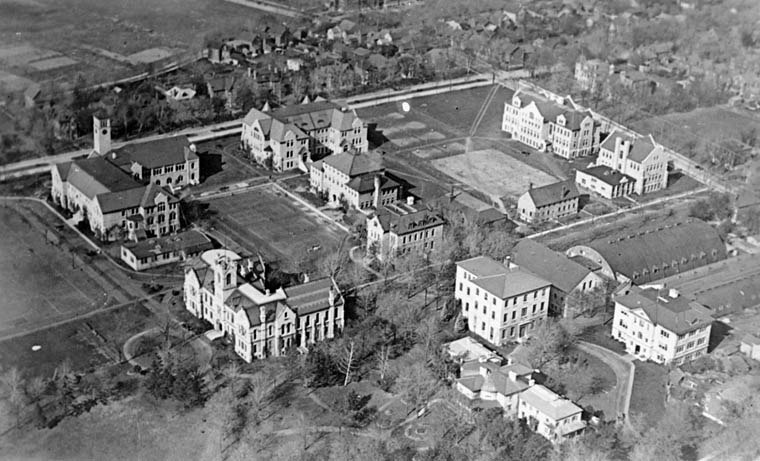
Aerial photo of Queen's University in 1919

The public funding of higher education in Ontario primarily relies on cooperation between the government of Canada and the government of Ontario. Public funding of higher education involves direct public funding of institutions for instruction, investment, and research combined with funding of students. To fund public higher education institutions, the government of Ontario can use funds from the Canada Health Transfer, Equalization and Territorial Formula Financing programs for financing instruction and investment. Funding of research is supported by the Canada Foundation for Innovation, Canada Research Chairs program, the Indirect Costs of Research program, and through Networks of Centres of Excellence. Both governments of Canada and Ontario provide funding and support for post-secondary students.

- Parents receive funding from the government of Canada to save money for the post-secondary education of their children. The Registered Education Savings Plan (RESP) is a financial instrument that acts as a tax shelter. The Canada Education Savings Grant provides funds to eligible parents to deposit into a RESP account. The Canada Learning Bond targets assistance to parents less likely to have funds available to contribute to a RESP account.
- Students may receive funding through Canadian student loans from the Canada-Ontario Integrated Student Loan program, grants or targeted bursaries available through the Ontario Student Assistance Program, or funds available from the Canada Millennium Scholarship Foundation. In addition, students with earnings who have previously contributed to a Canadian retirement tax shelter (i.e., the Registered Retirement Savings Plan) may make tax-free withdrawals under the Canadian tax system using the Lifelong Learning Plan as long as the funds are repaid within a ten-year period. Graduate students may also be eligible for funding through the Ontario Graduate Scholarship program or by applying for funding through the Social Sciences and Humanities Research Council.
- Students with family incomes below $160,000 are eligible for a 30% off university tuition rebate of $1,780 from the province.

Tuition fees in Ontario are higher than any other province in Canada. On average, undergraduate students pay 29% more and graduate students pay 41% more compared to the Canadian average. In the last 20 years, Ontario college tuition fees outpaced inflation by 435% and undergraduate tuition fees by 601%. Universities in Ontario educate more students with less provincial funding per student than any other province.

== Academic quality ==
A 2018 study of students in their first and last years at university found that, in the use of written or numerical information to solve problems, 25% of students showed inadequate ability, 45% showed adequate ability, while 30% showed superior ability. A comparison of critical thinking skills showed little improvement over the course of an average student's academic career.

== Access and participation ==
Ontario boasts the highest postsecondary participation and attainment rates among Canadian provinces, ranking high in international comparisons as well. A 2010 report from Statistics Canada, Education Indicators in Canada: An International Perspective, indicates that 63% of Ontario's population aged 25–34 have educational attainment to at least the tertiary level as compared to the national average of 56% and the average across OECD countries of 37%. A study commissioned by Colleges Ontario found that, between 2001–02 to 2006–07, 60% of Ontario students enrolled directly in postsecondary programs (34% in university, 20% in college, and 6% in apprenticeships) after five years of secondary school.

Despite these comparatively strong participation and attainment rates, under-represented groups in Ontario face access issues that are common around the world. The Higher Education Quality Council of Ontario (HEQCO) illustrates that issues such as geography and disability have negative impacts on participation that may largely relate back to family income and the cost of postsecondary education, but the two most significant factors affecting postsecondary participation in Ontario are parents' level of education and Aboriginal status, factors that relate more to the perception of higher education rather than the actual costs.

Ontario's Liberal government and the Ministry of Advanced Education and Skills Development embarked on the Reaching Higher plan for postsecondary education in the province beginning in 2005. The plan calls for a $6.2 billion investment in postsecondary education to address such issues as capacity, access, financial assistance and more, including a target postsecondary attainment rate of 70%.

Reaching Higher follows the 2005 report by the Honourable Bob Rae, Ontario: A Leader in Learning (a.k.a. the Rae Report), which also sparked the creation of the HEQCO. While current government efforts are intended to address issues of access, the HEQCO warns that a lack of reliable system-wide data will make it difficult to monitor the effects of these efforts and the state of access and participation in the future. One current source of data, Stats Canada's Youth in Transitions Survey (YITS), will soon end while another Stats Canada source, the Survey of Labour and Income Dynamics (SLID), provides less comprehensive data with respect to higher education transitions specifically.

In 2014, Ontario postsecondary enrolment fell for the first time in 15 years, with 2.9% fewer students enrolled at universities and 3.5% fewer at community colleges.

== Mobility and transfer ==
Ontario has a binary postsecondary education system consisting essentially of universities on one hand and colleges on the other (see Structure for details). This binary structure has been long-standing and intentional with little mobility between the two sides; a characteristic that has been maintained through formidable resistance from universities to develop a more articulated system. Only in recent years have pathways begun to emerge between these two otherwise distinct types of institutions.

In 1996, the provincial government initiated the College and University Consortium Council (CUCC) in order to foster closer collaboration between colleges and universities in Ontario. Three years later, in 1999, the Council of Ontario Universities (COU) and the Association of Colleges of Applied Arts and Technology of Ontario (ACAATO) jointly endorsed a set of principles governing mobility and transfer that has become known as the Port Hope Accord.

In the decade following, a collection of laddering and degree-completion agreements had begun to accumulate on the Ontario College University Transfer Guide (OCUTG). The agreements tend to be very specific between one university and one college. This style of transfer agreement differs from articulated systems such as those in British Columbia (see: British Columbia Council on Admissions and Transfer) and Alberta (see: Alberta Council on Admissions and Transfer).

The Honourable Bob Rae's 2005 report, Ontario: A Leader in Learning, makes the most recent call for improvements to student mobility and institutional cooperation. Following government endorsement of the Rae Report, in 2011 the CUCC evolved into the Ontario Council on Articulation and Transfer (ONCAT), which has assumed jurisdiction over the OCUTG; now known as the Ontario Postsecondary Transfer Guide (OPTG). ONCAT works to create establish and maintain pathways from college to college, college to university, and university to university transfers. They also work to maintain a province-wide transfer credit database.

In a recent study of student perspectives of postsecondary mobility in Ontario published in the Canadian Society for the Study of Higher Education Professional File, PhD. candidate Christine Arnold writes, "Transfer pathways have progressed significantly in the province over the last five years (College-University Consortium Council, 2007); resources and sources for transfer currently do not match this level of care."

== Differentiation ==
Ontario's current public university and college system was essentially established in the late 1960s; however, both systems have since changed, and the objective of colleges increasingly includes degree-granting powers. This brings into question the design of a college system discrete from universities and has led to Ontario's Ministry of Finance's formal recommendation to increase differentiation through establishing mandate agreements.

Since 2012, Ontario is driving its Differentiation Agenda encompassing several initiatives undertaken by the Government of Ontario to transform the postsecondary education system with the following overarching transformation goals: 1) support student success and access to a high quality Ontario postsecondary education; 2) increase the global competitiveness of Ontario's postsecondary education; 3) build on and help focus the well-established strengths of Ontario colleges and universities -while avoiding unnecessary duplication; and 4) maintain an efficient and financially sustainable postsecondary education system.

On November 29, 2013, Minister of Training, Colleges, and Universities released the final version of Differentiation Policy Framework for Postsecondary Education. The framework contains six components including jobs, innovation & economy, teaching and learning, student population, research and graduate education, program, and institutional collaboration; and two directions, namely strategic enrolment and financial sustainability with an associated set of metrics. Very limited information regarding how the components and metrics are to be used is available as the framework intends to provide a "vocabulary" for institutions to construct Strategic Mandate Agreements (SMAs). Strategic Mandate Agreements are the primary vehicles for implementing Ontario's differentiation goals. Institutions were required to submit SMA proposals in 2012 followed review by a committee appointed by the Higher Education Quality Council of Ontario. In August 2014, Ontario signed SMAs with its all 45 publicly funded colleges and universities. In 2015, Ontario's launching University Funding Formula Consultation with university sector to review and modernize the funding model. Consultations will include students, university leadership and faculty, as well as important partners such as employers, colleges, the elementary and secondary sector, and professional associations.

== Indigenous Students ==
2% of Ontario's population are First Nations, Inuit, and Métis people. Overall, Ontario's Indigenous communities are significantly younger and have a population growth rate four times higher than the non-Indigenous population in Ontario. 30.7% of people in Ontario have a university credential compared with only 11.8% of Indigenous people in Ontario. Today, 1.7% of university students and 3.6% of college students in Ontario overall are Indigenous; in northern Ontario, 9.2% of university students and 13% of college students are Indigenous.

Ontario contains nine Indigenous institutions: Anishinabek Education Institute, First Nations Technical Institute, Kenjgewin Teg Educational Institute, Iohahi:io Akwesasne Adult Education Centre, Oshki Pimache-O-Win Education and Training Institute, Ogwehoweh Skills and Trades Training Centre, Seven Generations Education Institute, Shingwauk Kinoomaage Gamig, and Six Nations Polytechnic. Indigenous institutions in Ontario operate without public funds and grant diplomas or degrees through partnerships with colleges and universities.

=== Educational Attainment in Ontario ===
	No certificate, diploma, or degree	High school certificate or equivalent	Apprenticeship or trades certificate or diploma	College, CEGEP, or other non-university certificate or diploma	University certificate, diploma, or degree
Total Ontario Population	13.6%	25%	8.8%	22%	30.7%
Ontario Indigenous Population	28.1%	24.2%	12.5%	23.4%	11.8%

== International students ==
The number of international students studying in Ontario universities has grown each year by an average of 7% since the start of the 21st century, until it grew by more than 8% in 2011–12 and 9% in 2012–13. Between 2000 and 2010, the number of international students at Ontario universities almost tripled. In 2013–14, 10% of all university enrolments in Ontario were international students contributing just under $3 billion annually to Ontario's economy. The top five source countries of international students at Ontario universities are China, India, Saudi Arabia, the United States, and Nigeria. International student enrolment at Ontario colleges is also growing, with a five-fold increase between 2000 and 2010.

Although tuition fees for domestic students are regulated by Ontario's provincial government, international student fees have not been regulated since 1996. As recently as the 1970s, there were no differential fees for international students in Ontario; however, as successive governments have divested from postsecondary education, institutions have used differential fees as a way to generate revenue. Today, international students thus pay, on average, 4.5 times more in tuition fees than domestic students. However, heavy reliance on revenue from foreign students can result in prioritizing the success of foreign students above the education and training of local students. In particular, universities must offer degrees that are of interest to foreign students. Also, the acceptance of students who are not sufficiently fluent in English or French requires an erosion of academic standards.

In 1994, the Ontario government excluded international students from the Ontario Health Insurance Program (OHIP). International students studying at universities must enrol in a private health insurance program called the University Health Insurance Plan (UHIP), while many international college students are also required to purchase mandatory private health insurance plans.

Ontario's Ministry of Citizenship, Immigration, and International Trade recruits international post-secondary students as permanent residents through three Provincial Nominee Programs: the International Student With Job Offer Stream, the International Masters Graduate Stream, and the International PhD Graduate Stream.

== Future ==
According to the Higher Education Quality Council of Ontario's predictions, the future of postsecondary education in Ontario will include increased diversity among students (due to continued immigration, growth in the number of adult learners, and efforts to increase participation by currently underrepresented groups); continued enrolment growth; greater student mobility between institutions; and technology-enabled changes to program delivery. Additional changes include gradual economic constraint, increasing integration with business and industry, and an extensive use of technology.

Ontario's Ministry of Finance identified five significant pressures currently faced by the postsecondary sector in Ontario: educating a growing share of the population; helping equalize economic and social outcomes across the population; providing an important component of lifelong learning; functioning as an engine of innovation; and delivering quality education with a constrained provincial fiscal situation.

The rapid increase (60% from in the last decade) in student enrolment in Ontario universities has not been met in similar increase of university professors (28% increase in the same time span) resulting in a student-to-faculty ratio of 26:1, which is much higher than the national average. Enrolment is projected to increase by an average of 1.7% through to 2017–18, meaning one of every six adult Ontarians will be enrolled in Ontario public post-secondary institutions. Internationalization of higher education is also on the rise, as the number of domestic students studying abroad and international students studying in Canada is increasing rapidly.

The Ministry of Advanced Education and Skills Development's Reaching Higher plan for postsecondary education in the province, initiated in 2005, includes a $6.2 billion commitment to postsecondary education to address such issues as capacity, access, financial assistance and more. The plan calls for, among other deliverables, a target postsecondary attainment rate of 70%. Following the October 2011 provincial election which resulted in a Liberal minority, the government re-affirmed its commitment to the reaching higher plan by announcing that 3 new undergraduate campuses will be established to serve increasing demand.

Academic Reform: Policy Options for Improving the Quality and Cost-Effectiveness of Undergraduate Education in Ontario, written by Ian D. Clark, David Trick and Richard J. Van Loon, provides recommendations on the way forward for Ontario higher education.

== See also ==
- Education in Ontario
- Higher education in Canada
- List of universities in Canada
- List of colleges in Canada
- List of colleges in Ontario
- List of business schools in Canada
- List of law schools in Canada
- List of Canadian universities by endowment
- Ministry of Education (Ontario)
- List of Ontario students' associations
- University colleges in Ontario
