= Automotive Business School of Canada =

School of Georgian College in Barrie, Ontario

The Automotive Business School of Canada is a school of Georgian College based in Barrie, Ontario. It also organizes the Georgian College Auto Show, the largest outdoor auto show in North America. The school offers an Automotive Certification Course on behalf of the Ontario Motor Vehicle Industry Council, which is required to be a vehicle salesperson in Ontario. The school offers a 2-year diploma in automotive business and a 4-year Honours Bachelor of Business Administration (Automotive Management). Both are co-op programs.
