= Rebis Academy of Technology =

Canadian Institute of engineering and management

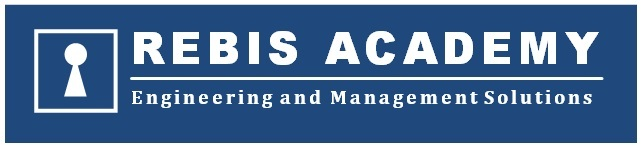
- Motto: Success comes for those who are prepared
- Type: Private
- Established: 2012
- President: Alireza Niakani
- Location: Toronto, Ontario, Canada

Rebis Academy of Technology is a privately owned institution in Toronto, Canada, which provides professional training programs and courses in engineering and management.

== History ==
In 2004, Rebis Academy of Technology has been founded in response to the need for skilled Oil & Gas engineers and technicians in Middle Eastm which were mostly in Abu Dhabi, Dubai, Kuwait and Iran. In 2012, Rebis Academy of Technology opened its new office as a head office in Toronto, Canada.

== Profile ==
The Academy offers a wide variety of training programs and courses form introductory to advanced in the key areas of engineering and management for university or college graduates, entry-level or experienced engineers and managers.

=== Departments ===
- Petroleum Engineering
- Chemical Engineering
- Piping Engineering
- Instrumentation & Control Engineering
- Mechanical Engineering
- Electrical Engineering
- Civil & Structural Engineering
- Inspection & Maintenance Engineering
- Safety Engineering
- Project Management

=== Programs & Courses ===
The Academy has more than 300 programs leading to certificates and diplomas in the fallowing categories:

- Petroleum Training: Provides candidates with an understanding of Exploration, Well Logging and Log Interpretation, Drilling and Completion, Production and Operations
- Chemical Training: Provides candidates with an understanding of Process Design, PFD and P&ID, Process Equipment Design and Process Simulation and Optimization
- Piping Training: Provides candidates with an understanding of Piping Design, Process Plant Layout Design and Pipe Stress Analysis
- Instrumentation & Control Training: Provides candidates with an understanding of Field Instruments and Control Valves
- Mechanical Training: Provides candidates with an understanding of Storage and Pressure Vessel Design and Analysis
- Electrical Training: Provides candidates with an understanding of Electrical Power System Design and Protection
- Civil & Structural Training: Provides candidates with an understanding of Civil and Steel Structure Design and Analysis
- Inspection & Maintenance Training: Provides candidates with an understanding of Plant Facilities Operation, Inspection and Maintenance
- Safety Training: Provides candidates with an understanding of Process Plant Safe Design and Hazop Study
- Project Management Training Provides candidates with an understanding of EPC Project Management, Project Control and Planning

=== Academic Board and Instructors ===
The academy has 10 Academic advisers which are key instructors as well. They are responsible for maintaining the superior standards of course materials and ensuring the high-quality delivery of them.

=== Locations ===
The academy has 10 regional branches in Canada, United States, Europe, Africa, Asia and Middle East.

== See also ==
- Higher education in Ontario
- List of colleges in Ontario
