= Bridge program =

Canadian college credit transfer agreement

A bridge program is a partnership in Canada between two post-secondary institutions that allows students to transfer college credits from one institution to another. A bridge program student typically holds a two-year college degree and wants to obtain a four-year or graduate degree.

This differs from Bridging Programs offered by Ontario colleges for non-Canadian students.

Most bridge programs can be categorized into three types of agreements:

- Bilateral: An agreement outlined between two institutions and two specific programs of similar content. Students are permitted to use some of their initial credits toward the completion of another program at the partner institution. Example: Seneca/York Joint Degrees
- Multilateral: An agreement between one institution and several institutions that offer related programs of interest. The completion of one program will directly lead to a specific degree program. Example: The completion of any Ontario Public College Recreation and Leisure Services Diploma and entrance to Brock University's Bachelor of Recreation and Leisure Studies
- Concurrent: A collaborative agreement between two institutions, whereby students will work toward two sets of qualifications (such as a diploma and a degree) at the same time, and on the same campus. Example: University of Guelph-Humber.

The term bridge program also refers to a pipeline program for incoming students to an institution of higher education in the US.

== History of bridge programs in Ontario ==
The College University Consortium Council (CUCC) was created in 1996 by the Ontario Ministry of Colleges and Universities as an advisory body to help devise direct transfer routes between post-secondary institutions for all Ontario students. Membership is voluntary for all post-secondary institutions. While the CUCC aims to help institutions create bridge programs, it still maintains that colleges and universities have full autonomy on the specifics of the agreements created.

One of the first projects of the CUCC was the development of a mutual agreement between Ontario colleges and universities. In 1999, Ontario colleges and universities signed the Ontario College-University Degree Completion Accord (Port Hope Accord). It states that a three-year college diploma program should provide a student with a minimum of eleven transfer credits (equivalent to at least 2 years of study) toward a four-year bachelor's degree, and a two-year diploma program should allow the student to earn six to eight university transfer credits toward a degree (equivalent to 1 or 1.5 years). These minimum requirements were chosen based on the average amount of transfer credits awarded in the past by Registrars' Offices across Ontario universities.

By 2005, the Bob Rae Report declared that "nowhere near enough progress has been made" because student demand for transfer agreements still overpowered the actual number of diploma-to-degree programs available. The report suggested that research must be done to link related programming between institutions as collaborative degree programs, and create more academic pathways for students to achieve their career goals. It also suggested the creation of standardized courses that could be transferred into any Ontario diploma or degree program. The Higher Education Quality Council of Ontario was established in the same year as an advisory body to the provincial government, which commissions research on student post-secondary experience and recommendations to improve higher education in Ontario.

To better serve students interested in researching bridge program pathways, the CUCC made information more accessible by developing the Ontario College-University Transfer Guide. As of October 2010, there were 514 agreements listed.

The Ministry of Colleges and Universities established a new coordinating body in 2011 to replace the CUCC. The Ontario Council for Articulation and Transfer (ONCAT)'s ultimate goal is to create a transfer model framework that grants all college diploma graduates the possibility to begin a degree program without repeating courses of similar content.

== History of Bridge Programs in the USA ==
The term bridge program also refers to a lifestyle acclimation program for incoming students to an institution of higher education in the US. Such a program prepares rising college freshman for the academic and social environments that await them once their first semester of college has begun. A college bridge program usually takes place for about 3–4 weeks in the summer before the fall semester of university's calendar. During this time, summer college bridge program participants are invited to live on the campus and study on the campus. Students who chose to enroll in a summer college bridge program also receive organic opportunities to meet their peers before the academic year begins, as well meet other administrators and university faculty who can facilitate a smooth transition from high school to college. Many colleges and universities also offer college bridge programs specifically for BIPOC (black, indigenous person of color), first-generation college students, and any other historically marginalized or underrepresented groups in higher education in order to close the gap in postsecondary education in those demographics.

=== Inception ===
Originally, the idea of a summer bridge program was conceived to increase college attendance retention in "ethnic/racial minority, low-income, first-generation, or other student populations deemed at risk of dropping out of college." Students from those demographics were invited to their college campuses sometime in the summer before the academic years officially began; then, they would take a set of standardized, non-credit bearing courses that covered general subject areas (humanities, sciences, possibly even the arts) and were designed to resemble actual, college-level, credit-bearing courses. Students involved in these programs were also given access to peer mentoring from volunteered upperclassmen. Parents also were involved in this program framework, as they were given learning materials on the organization of a college or university and how different departments, divisions, and offices supported students and their development on campus. The cost of the bridge programs vary from school to school, but generally, there may be a tuition or campuses services fee associated with a college summer bridge program. Some institutions charge students and families who wish to participate in these types of programs a reduced cost from that of their fall semester's bill, and others may waive the cost completely based on a student's financial background or simply because of the nature of the program.

=== Application ===
Two examples of paid for and non-paid for college summer bridge programs can be found at Indiana University of Pennsylvania (IUP). IUP is a public university in the Pennsylvania State System of Higher Education (PASSHE). It is located in western Pennsylvania. IUP offers two brief summer bridge type programs.

==== Creating College Success ====
The first is called Creating College Success (CSP). This program is open to any incoming student to this institution, however, it does note that its resources are limited, and so it is offered on a first-come first serve sign up basis. IUP also advertises the same structure of a college summer bridge program as dictated by previously mentioned guidelines. The only outlying factor is that this program is only one week long. However, the costs and fees associated with participation are not at all equivalent to a regular semester's bill; in fact, when compared, the cost of the Creating College Success Program is menial compared to a typical 15-credit student course load. Furthermore, the courses that IUP gives students who participate in this program count towards their free-elective degree requirement.

==== Crimson Scholars Circle ====
The second college bridge style program that IUP offers is called the Crimson Scholars Circle (CSC). This upcoming academic year, 2022-2023, will be the second year of the program's installment. This program is specifically catered towards students of color, and even offers pathways to network with members of the institution's Black Alumni Committee. There is no cost associated with participation in CSC; in fact, students engagement is actually incentivized in this model, as Scholars receive a $1000 scholarship. Similar to CSP, students also receive a credit-bearing course which will give them skills that they can use to succeed in college.

== Limitations to bridge program creation ==
=== Dualistic post-secondary system ===
The Ontario college system was created in 1965 as a solution to the growing number of secondary school graduates who could not be sustained by the current post-secondary system. It was developed as a separate route from university, with different secondary school prerequisites, that leads students to a distinct set of career choices. Since the inception of the college system, post-secondary education in Ontario has preserved its separate yet parallel tracks, despite changing demands in the workforce.

With the shift of the job market toward hiring employees with a bachelor or graduate degrees for occupations that previously accepted college diplomas, it is becoming less likely for students to enroll in a diploma program if they cannot be guaranteed entry into a bachelor's program upon completion of their courses. Creating mutually beneficial bridge programs between colleges and universities may prove to be difficult, as both systems were created and have developed as completely separate entities with distinct policies and curriculum to meet the needs of their student bodies.

=== Misconceptions ===
Danielle Renaud began a preliminary study in 2000 to discover the major barriers to collaborative programs between post-secondary institutions through a series of interviews with senior administrators at colleges and universities throughout Ontario. A total of twenty-five colleges and eighteen universities were surveyed.

The most commonly perceived obstacle to the creation of bridge programs mentioned by both college and university administrators was the existence of elitist attitudes by some university faculty. The college respondents regarded university faculty as "arrogant and unapproachable" and did not feel confident that their efforts would be positively received. University respondents echoed this statement; they admitted that faculty often viewed college programs as "lesser education" and that this stereotypical mindset would be difficult to overcome. University faculty may be hesitant to approach the subject of collaborative agreements with college diploma programs because they do not view it as a relationship that will benefit the reputation of their own institution. They continue to view colleges in their traditional role as a preparation for the workplace, and feel as though they must protect the integrity of university education by remaining a separate entity. Conversely, many college faculty fear a union with universities as they are concerned that they will be swallowed by the larger institution and lose their voice in the decision making process; they value their programming and presume that the universities will be unwilling to make compromises when it comes to creating program parameters.

=== Ambiguity of transfer credit process ===
The ambiguity of the transfer process between colleges and universities does not promote the attainment of higher knowledge in a field of study, as many students feel discouraged to continue in their studies when their prior experience is not always fully recognized at the university level. Most bridge programs were created by individual efforts of faculty members in specific departments instead of the institution as a whole. These idiosyncrasies make the transfer process sometimes difficult, as students must navigate inconsistent admissions policies that do not always work in their favor. In addition, most universities will not tell students how many transfer credits they will receive until they have actually applied to the program. Without a uniform system to assess transfer credits, students cannot predict how many transfer credits they will receive at each university, or how their diploma program will prepare them for university studies.

=== Province-wide curriculum disparity ===
One of the largest impediments to creating comprehensive bridge programs is the fact that there is no standardized curriculum between similar diploma and degree programs in the province. Without a specified standard of practice outlined for certain fields of study, it is almost impossible to guarantee the same amount of transfer credits at every Ontario institution, as it is likely that a student may not have completed a specific course that a student at another institution was required to take. University officials in Renaud's study stated that they did not feel comfortable accepting current college curriculum as an equivalent to the first two years of a bachelor's degree program: they were concerned with the attained education level of the faculty at college campuses, as not all colleges require instructors to possess a doctorate or conduct a minimum amount of research. Colleges and universities may not be open to standardizing the curricula in their programs, as they would need to give up their autonomy and possibly lose distinctive features in their curricula that help to recruit students to their specific program.

=== Participation History ===
Although a formalized agreement would result in more transfer applicants, many university officials are reluctant to sign bridge program agreements with colleges as it would mean a significant loss of tuition income. Without the formalized agreement, transfer students receive on average one year or less worth of credits toward a bachelor's degree. This structure ensures that the student will likely be enrolled in a university program for at least three years. With the successful creation of province-wide post-secondary agreements, students would attend university for two years and significantly reduce tuition costs. Loss of funding, despite rising enrollment numbers, could be disastrous as programs could become oversubscribed without adequate financial coverage. There is also a valid concern that only universities that need more student applications would be more willing to cooperate with college programs. Larger institutions that already receive an overwhelming number of high school applicants to fill their programs would be less likely to agree to the lengthy process of creating specialized programs.

== See also ==
- Articulation (education)
- College transfer
- Credit transfer

== Sources ==
- Arnold, Christine. (2009). Seamless Higher Education? Sewing a Model for Transfer in Ontario. (Master's thesis). Brock University, St. Catharines, Ontario.
- Association of Canadian Community Colleges. (2011). Transferability and Post-secondary Pathways: The Role of Canadian Colleges and Institutes.
- Boggs, A. & Trick, D (2009). Making College-University Collaboration Work: Ontario in a National and International Context. Toronto: Higher Education Quality Council of Ontario.
- Decock, H., McCloy, U., Liu, S & Hu, B. (2011). The Transfer Experience of Ontario Colleges who Further their Education – An analysis of Ontario's College Graduate Satisfaction Survey.Toronto: Higher Education Quality Council of Ontario.
- Ministry of Training, Colleges and Universities. (2010). Report of the College-University Consortium Council. Toronto, ON: Maureen E. Callahan.
- Ontario Confederation of University Faculty Associations. (2008). College/University Programs Leading to Undergraduate Degrees: A Discussion Paper.
- Renaud, Danielle. (2000). An Examination of the Barriers to Articulation Agreements Between Colleges and Universities in Ontario. (Doctoral dissertation). Retrieved from the National Library of Canada. (0-612-49863-8).
