= Science and Conscience =

- Genre: Current affairs
- Directed by: Jack Sampson
- Presented by: Patrick Watson
- Country of origin: Canada
- Original language: English
- No. of seasons: 1
- No. of episodes: 8

Production
- Executive producer: Lister Sinclair
- Producer: James Murray
- Running time: 30 minutes

Original release
- Network: CBC Television
- Release: 23 May – 11 July 1968

Science and Conscience is a Canadian current affairs television program that aired on CBC Television in 1968.

== Premise ==
Each episode consisted of a panel discussion on a particular topic of technology, science and ethics as hosted by Patrick Watson.

== Scheduling ==
This half-hour program was broadcast on Thursdays at 10:30 p.m. (Eastern time) from 23 May to 11 July 1968.

1. 23 May 1968: "Turn A Blind Eye", concerning the relationships of the scientific community with governments, businesses and citizens, with panellists Jacob Bronowski, James Eayrs, and Malcolm Muggeridge
2. 30 May 1968: "Building Better Babies", with panellists William Edwin Beckel, Malcolm Muggeridge and Margaret Thompson
3. 6 June 1968: "Color Me Different", concerning distinctions of ethnicity, nationality and race
4. 13 June 1968: "Kill And Overkill", about the atomic arms race, with panellists Norman Alcock, Ralph Lapp, John Polyani
5. 20 June 1968: "Man on the Moon", with panellists Walter Goldschmidt, Donald Ivey and Ralph Lapp
6. 27 June 1968: "Learn, Baby, Learn", concerning whether academic degrees should have time limits, with panellists A. J. Ayer, David Bates and Donald Ivey
7. 4 July 1968: "Should They Or Shouldn't They?", concerning euthanasia, with panellists A. J. Ayer, Elie Cass and Peter Rechnitzer
8. 11 July 1968: "Bend, Staple, And Mutilate", concerning government use of technology for surveillance of citizens, with panellists Jacob Bronowski, James Eayrs, and Malcolm Muggeridge
