= OCAS Application Services =

Canadian non-profit corporation

Coordinates: 43.49044°N 80.20960°W

- Logo of OCAS Application Services
- Founded: 1991
- Founders: Colleges of Applied Arts and Technology of Ontario
- Type: Non-profit corporation
- Headquarters: Guelph, Ontario, Canada
- Region served: Ontario, Canada
- Services: Postsecondary application processing and data services
- Website: www.ocas.ca
- Formerly called: Ontario College Application Service

OCAS Application Services, formerly known as the Ontario College Application Service (OCAS), is a non-profit corporation established in 1991 by the Colleges of Applied Arts and Technology and the Institutes of Technology and Advanced Learning in Ontario, Canada.

OCAS provides centralized application services for Ontario's 24 Colleges of Applied Arts and Technology (CAAT). Three non-CAAT institutions also use its application services. Applications are submitted through the ontariocolleges.ca platform, which operates in English and French.

OCAS is headquartered in Guelph, Ontario.

== History ==
=== Establishment ===
OCAS was created in 1991 as a centralized application processing service for Ontario's publicly funded colleges. Prior to its establishment, applicants were required to submit separate applications to individual colleges. The organization was formed by the province's Colleges of Applied Arts and Technology to provide a single, coordinated application system for college admissions in Ontario.

From its inception, OCAS represented all 24 Colleges of Applied Arts and Technology. Its mandate focused on domestic applicant processing and the standardization of admissions-related data for participating institutions.

=== Development of ontariocolleges.ca ===
As application volumes increased and online services expanded, OCAS transitioned from paper-based application processing to digital systems. The ontariocolleges.ca website was developed as the primary public-facing platform for applicants, allowing users to search programs and submit applications electronically.

In 2013, OCAS launched a redesigned version of the ontariocolleges.ca website, introducing updated navigation and application features intended to support online application submission and program discovery.

=== Expansion of services ===
In 2017, OCAS introduced the International Application Service (IAS), a separate application platform designed for use by international admissions departments at Ontario public colleges. The IAS was developed in collaboration with participating institutions and was adopted by a growing number of colleges following its launch.

By the mid-2020s, the IAS was used by more than half of Ontario’s public colleges, as well as one Ontario university.

OCAS also expanded its role in admissions-related data management by maintaining a centralized data warehouse containing applicant data used by colleges, secondary schools, and government organizations for reporting and planning purposes.

=== Recent developments ===
In November 2025, OCAS launched a redesigned Ontario Colleges website and brand. The update reflected changes to the presentation and organization of program information and application tools available through ontariocolleges.ca.

== Participating institutions ==
OCAS Application Services provides centralized application processing for Ontario’s publicly funded colleges, as well as a small number of additional participating institutions.

=== Colleges of Applied Arts and Technology (CAATs) ===
The following 24 publicly funded Colleges of Applied Arts and Technology in Ontario use OCAS as their centralized application service:

- Algonquin College
- Cambrian College
- Canadore College
- Centennial College
- Collège Boréal
- Collège La Cité
- Conestoga College
- Confederation College
- Durham College
- Fanshawe College
- Fleming College
- George Brown College
- Georgian College
- Humber College
- Lambton College
- Loyalist College
- Mohawk College
- Niagara College
- Northern College
- Sault College
- Seneca College
- Sheridan College
- St. Clair College
- St. Lawrence College

=== Other participating institutions ===
In addition to the CAATs, several non-CAAT institutions use OCAS application services for select programs.

- University of Guelph-Humber
- Royal Military College of Canada (select college-delivered programs)

== Funding ==
OCAS Application Services is funded primarily through fees collected from participating colleges for the processing of applications, as well as through revenue from value-added services such as data reporting and analytics. The organization operates on a non-profit basis, with surplus revenues reinvested into the development and maintenance of its application platforms and related services.

Provincial government support is not directly provided to OCAS; however, the organization works in coordination with the Ministry of Colleges and Universities in Ontario to ensure alignment with provincial postsecondary policy and standards.

Additional funding may come from partnerships with educational institutions and organizations for specialized programs, such as the International Application Service (IAS), which generates fees from international student applications. OCAS uses these funds to enhance its technological infrastructure, maintain bilingual services, and support data management initiatives for participating colleges.

== ontariocolleges.ca ==
ontariocolleges.ca
- Logo of ontariocolleges.ca
- Founded: 1991
- Type: Online application system
- Region served: Ontario, Canada
- Services: College program search and application submission
- Owner: OCAS Application Services
- Website: www.ontariocolleges.ca

ontariocolleges.ca is an online application system operated by OCAS Application Services for Ontario's public colleges. The website enables applicants to search college programs and submit applications to participating institutions through a centralized process.

The platform is used by domestic and international applicants and supports applications in English and French. It serves as the primary application system for Ontario's Colleges of Applied Arts and Technology and select non-CAAT institutions.

== See also ==
- List of colleges in Ontario
- Ontario Universities' Application Centre
- University and college admission
