= David Trick =

David Trick may refer to:

- David Trick (university administrator) (born 1955), Canadian civil servant and university administrator.
- David Trick (rugby union) (born 1960), English rugby union player for Bath and England.
