= Ian D. Clark (civil servant) =

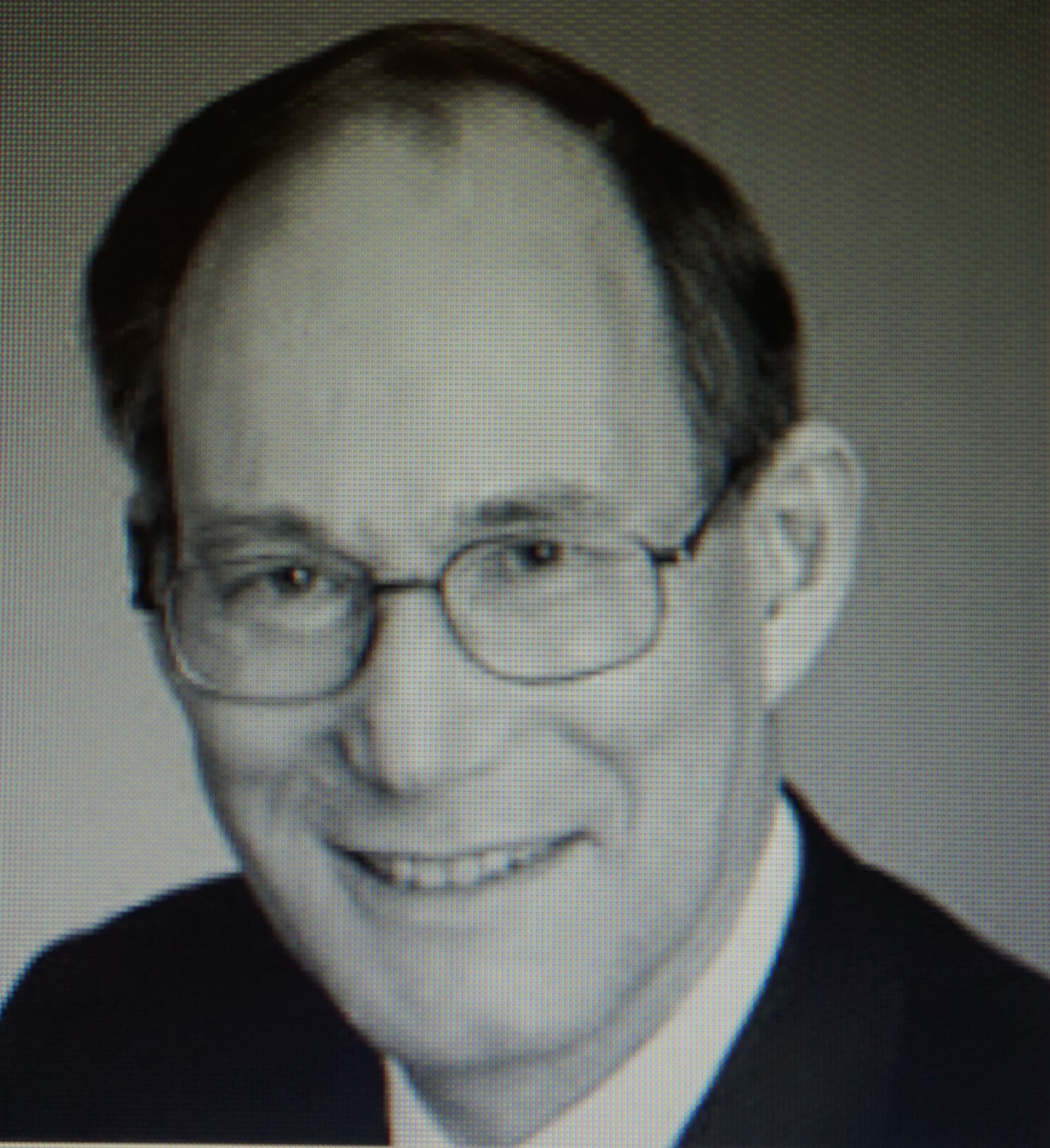
Ian D. Clark

Ian D. Clark, CM (born April 15, 1946) is an adjunct professor at the University of Victoria, a senior fellow in the Munk School of Global Affairs and Public Policy at the University of Toronto, a Canadian former civil servant, and former president of the Council of Ontario Universities.

Clark completed a Bachelor of Science from the University of British Columbia in 1966, a DPhil from the University of Oxford in 1969, and a Master of Public Policy at the John F. Kennedy School of Government at Harvard University in 1972.

His career in the Canadian Public Service has included positions at the Privy Council Office, Department of Consumer and Corporate Affairs, and concluded as Secretary of the Treasury Board of Canada in 1994. Clark is past chair of Statistics Canada’s National Advisory Committee on Post-secondary Education Statistics and the Departmental Audit Committee for Indigenous Affairs and Northern Development Canada. He is a member of the editorial board of the Canadian Public Administration Journal. Clark also served as an Executive Director at the International Monetary Fund and as President of the Council of Ontario Universities from 1998 to 2007. From 2007-2019, he was a professor at the University of Toronto School of Public Policy and Governance (now the Munk School of Global Affairs and Public Policy) where he is currently a senior fellow. In 2018, Clark became an adjunct professor in the School of Public Administration at University of Victoria.

In May 2009, he was made a Member of the Order of Canada for his contributions to "further Canadian public policy, governance and education".

Clark is co-author of Academic Reform: Policy Options for Improving the Quality and Cost-Effectiveness of Undergraduate Education in Ontario (with David Trick and Richard Van Loon, 2011) and Academic Transformation: The Forces Reshaping Higher Education in Ontario (with David Trick, Greg Moran and Michael Skolnik, 2009), both published by McGill-Queen’s University Press. Along with Leslie A. Pal, Ian Clark is the co-creator of the Atlas of Public Management, an online encyclopedia of public policy concepts, curricula, and resources that began in 2008 as a multi-year research project funded by the Government of Canada.
