= Dominion-Provincial Student Loan Program =

The Dominion-Provincial Student Loan Program was the first federally funded student loan program accessible to university students in Canada.

Originally, only five provinces joined the initiative, but by 1944 all nine provinces were participating. Newfoundland joined the scheme in 1950, soon after joining confederation in 1949.

It is also known as the Dominion-Provincial Student Aid Program.

== History ==
The Dominion-Provincial Student Loan Program started in 1939 and developed out of the 1937 Dominion-Provincial Youth Program which was designed to provide vocational training to youth who had been denied access to training during the depression years. In 1964, the Canada Student Loans Program (CSLP) replaced the Dominion-Provincial Student Loan Program. The province of Quebec left the arrangement in 1954 because of concerns surrounding jurisdiction and autonomy.

== Purpose ==
It was based on a matching grants system. If students required financial assistance and were of high academic standing, the Government of Canada in partnership with a provincial government would provide a matching grant to the student. The effectiveness of the program was questionable because it helped on average less than 3000 students per year, while university enrollment increased from just approximately 35,000 in 1939 to over 100,000 in 1960 (Fisher et al., 2005). Additionally, it is estimated the federal government only spent $5 million total on the program (Canadian Encyclopedia, 2007).

== Impact ==
The main impact of the program was that it firmly established the role of the federal government in the funding of higher education. The controversy surrounding this is that in both the Canadian Constitution and its predecessor, the British North America Acts, education is the jurisdiction of the provinces. A matching grants system left the provincial governments vulnerable to interference from the federal government.

The implementation of the program affected student funding in three ways:

1. It stimulated provincial growth in funding student loan programs.
2. The financial need of the student became the primary reason for funding, rather than academic prowess.
3. It cemented the importance of the federal government in funding and coordinating student aid. (Canadian Encyclopedia, 2007)
