= Ontario Universities' Application Centre =

Canadian higher education applications organization

Coordinates: 43.5210°N 80.22960°W

- Centre de demande d’admission aux universités de l’Ontario
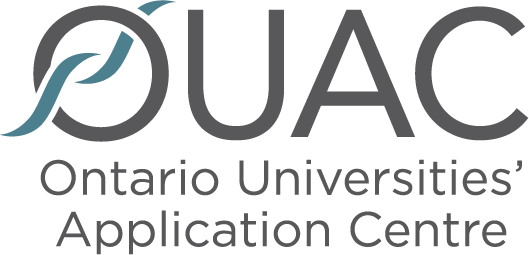
- Formation: 1971
- Type: Non-profit university application service
- Headquarters: Guelph, Ontario
- Parent organization: Council of Ontario Universities
- Website: www.ouac.on.ca

The Ontario Universities' Application Centre (OUAC; French: Centre de demande d’admission aux universités de l’Ontario) is a non-profit organization based in Guelph that processes online applications for admission to universities in Ontario, Canada. It was founded in 1971 by the Council of Ontario Universities and the Ontario Universities' Council on Admissions, to reduce the duplication and costs involved in processing applications. It is a division of the Council of Ontario Universities.

The OUAC processes applications to undergraduate programs, medical school, law school, teacher education, and rehabilitation sciences programs at nearly all of Ontario's universities – only the RMC does not process applications through the OUAC.

== History ==
The OUAC was founded in 1971 by the Committee of Presidents of the Universities of Ontario, now called the Council of Ontario Universities, and the Ontario Universities' Council on Admissions (OUCA).

Before the OUAC was formed, each university processed its own applications. Students could accept offers of admission to more than one university, which left universities with vacant spots in the fall (since students were not required to notify the universities they had decided not to attend). Processing all applications in one place meant less duplication and costs. Since the 1970s, the OUAC has expanded its services to include publications, transcript distribution, surveys, data collection and statistical reports used by governments and universities.

In 1972, the OUAC processed more than 135,000 undergraduate applications. Today, more than 200,000 applicants submit approximately 600,000 applications to the OUAC every year. By 2012, the OUAC had processed more than 14 million applications, submitted by more than 4.5 million applicants.

Starting in 1975, the OUAC began processing applications to professional programs, including medicine (1975), teacher education (1979), law (1997) and rehabilitation sciences (2000). Each program has its own application service. These services were developed by admissions officers at the respective universities to reduce duplication and save time and money for the applicants and the universities.

In 2003, during the double cohort year when the last group of Grade 13 students graduated at the same time as Grade 12 students, the OUAC received 86,000 online applications in two months.

Applications were paper-based until the late 1990s. By 2011, 99 percent of all applications were completed online.

== Funding ==
The OUAC is a non-profit agency funded through student application fees and the contract services it provides for the universities. After all costs are recovered, the OUAC gives any remaining revenue to the universities to help with their admissions processing costs.

== Primary role ==
The OUAC processes English and French applications for undergraduate and professional programs (medicine, law, teacher education, and rehabilitation sciences), and graduate programs at some universities in Ontario.

=== Secondary roles ===
- Maintaining the Ontario Universities' Info website (in English and French), a searchable database of information on all Ontario university programs, including admission requirements, scholarships, etc.
- Overseeing the Ontario Universities’ Fair (OUF), a three-day event held each fall in Toronto. Ontario universities are exhibitors at this event, where students and parents can learn about university life.
- Coordinating the Ontario Universities' Regional Fairs, a series of events held each fall in cities and towns across Ontario. Representatives from the universities make presentations and speak to students, parents and educators.
- Providing online tools that allow Ontario high school guidance counsellors and school officials to access student information in the OUAC database and exchange it with universities. Users can create student accounts, submit grades, update academic files, view completed applications, etc.
- Maintaining the Ontario Universities’ Electronic Transcript System (OUETS), where students can request, through the OUAC website, to have copies of their academic transcripts (from Ontario universities and colleges) sent to any Ontario university.

== Application types ==
The OUAC processes all undergraduate and professional applications on behalf of Ontario’s universities (except the Royal Military College of Canada). Applicants submit their application to the OUAC, indicating all choices they wish to apply for. The OUAC does not make any admission decisions.

=== Undergraduate ===
The OUAC forwards undergraduate applications to all requested universities and/or programs.

=== Professional ===
The OUAC processes applications for professional programs at Ontario universities (medicine, law, teacher education, and rehabilitation sciences). While the OUAC processes the applications, it does not make any admission decisions.

The Ontario Law School Application Service (OLSAS) processes applications for admission to Ontario’s law schools. This includes applications for Osgoode Hall Law School at York University, Bora Laskin Faculty of Law at Lakehead University, Lincoln Alexander School of Law at Toronto Metropolitan University, University of Ottawa, the Queen's University Faculty of Law, University of Toronto, Western University, and University of Windsor.

The Ontario Medical School Application Service (OMSAS) processes applications for admission to Ontario’s medical schools. For the Northern Ontario School of Medicine, Michael G. DeGroote School of Medicine at McMaster University, Toronto Metropolitan University, University of Ottawa, Queen's University, University of Toronto and Schulich School of Medicine & Dentistry at Western University.

The Ontario Rehabilitation Sciences Programs Application Service (ORPAS) processes applications to occupational therapy, physiotherapy and physical therapy, audiology and speech-language pathology programs offered at the graduate level at some Ontario universities. This includes applicants for Laurentian University, McMaster University, University of Ottawa, Queen's University, University of Toronto, and Western University.

The Teacher Education Application Service (TEAS) processes applications for admission to Ontario’s faculties of education. This includes applicants for Brock University, Lakehead University, Laurentian University, Nipissing University, UOF, Ontario Tech University, University of Ottawa, Queen's University, Trent University, Western University, Wilfrid Laurier University, University of Windsor, and York University.

University	Undergraduate	OLSAS	OMSAS	ORPAS	TEAS
Algoma University					
Brock University					
Carleton University					
University of Guelph					
Université de Hearst					
Lakehead University					
Laurentian University					
McMaster University					
Nipissing University					
NOSM University					
OCAD University					
Université de l'Ontario français					
Ontario Tech University					
University of Ottawa					
Queen's University					
Royal Military College of Canada (Note: RMCC offers undergraduate programs; but the applications are not processed by the OUAC.)					
University of Toronto					
Toronto Metropolitan University					
Trent University					
University of Waterloo					
Western University					
Wilfrid Laurier University					
University of Windsor					
York University					

== See also ==
- List of Ontario Universities
- Ontario College Application Service
