= Robin Hugh Farquhar =

Canadian university administrator

3rd President of The University of Winnipeg
- In office 1981–1989
- Preceded by: Henry Duckworth
- Succeeded by: Marsha Hanen; Ross McCormack (Interim)

President of Carleton University
- In office 1989–1996
- Preceded by: William Edwin Beckel
- Succeeded by: Richard J. Van Loon

Personal details
- Born: December 1, 1938 (age 87) Victoria, British Columbia
- Education: University of British Columbia; University of Chicago

Robin Hugh Farquhar (born December 1, 1938) is a Canadian academic and former university administrator. He was president of the University of Winnipeg from 1981 to 1989 (where he is now president emeritus) and president of Carleton University from 1989 to 1996 (where he is now professor emeritus of public policy and administration).

Born in Victoria, British Columbia, Farquhar received a B.A. (Honours) and an M.A. in English from the University of British Columbia and a Ph.D. in Educational Administration from the University of Chicago.

Prior to his presidencies at Carleton University and the University of Winnipeg, Farquhar served as dean of education at the University of Saskatchewan, Assistant Director of the Ontario Institute for Studies in Education, and Deputy Director of the University Council for Educational Administration in the U.S.

He chaired the Canadian Bureau for International Education and served as President of the Commonwealth Council for Educational Administration and of the Canadian Society for the Study of Education, and he has been a Director of the Canadian Education Association, the Canadian Comprehensive Auditing Foundation, the Inter-American Society for Educational Administration, the Winnipeg Symphony Orchestra, the Corporate - Higher Education Forum in Canada, and the National Academy for School Executives in the U.S. He also served as Campaign Chair for the United Way of Winnipeg and he has been elected Vice-Chair on the Board of Directors for Academics Without Borders.

The author of several published books and articles in academic and professional journals, Farquhar has been active as an international consultant in higher education policy and management — in particular through Universities Canada, the European University Association, and the Salzburg Global Seminar — and he has served as a member of the governing body for the University of Madeira in Portugal and of the international strategic support group for the National University of Kyiv-Mohyla Academy in Ukraine, as well as spending five months in-country as a Strategic Advisor for establishing the University of Rwanda in Africa. Since the mid-1990s Farquhar has served as a special advisor to the heads of higher education institutions in more than 20 countries throughout Europe and the former Soviet Union.
