= Higher Education Quality Council of Ontario =

University in Toronto, Canada

- Established: 2005
- President: Malcolm Butler
- Location: 88 Queen's Quay West, Suite 2500, Toronto, Ontario M5J 0B6, Toronto, Ontario, Canada
- Website: www.heqco.ca

The Higher Education Quality Council of Ontario (HEQCO) is a provincial agency funded by the Ontario Ministry of Colleges and Universities (MCU). The goal of the agency is to provide recommendations for improving quality, accessibility, inter-institutional transfer, system planning, and effectiveness in higher education in Ontario. The council was founded in 2005 through the Higher Education Quality Council of Ontario Act.

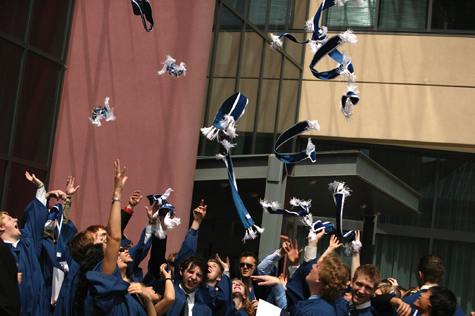
Sheridan College 2

== Background ==
In 2005, Bob Rae released a comprehensive review of postsecondary education entitled Ontario: A leader in learning, more commonly known as the Rae Report or Rae Review. The report included a recommendation to change the structure of higher education in Ontario by adding an independent and objective Council on Higher Education to monitor the dynamic changes of postsecondary institutions in order to provide advice to government on the overall system. The provincial government acted on this recommendation and created an independent advisory agency to provide assessment and advice to improve higher education in Ontario. In 2005, the provincial government established the Council through the Higher Education Quality Council of Ontario Act and appointed Frank Iacobucci as its chair. The formation of the council was part of the provincial government's Reaching Higher six-year plan for higher education. In January 2007, the council announced the appointment of James Downey as its first president.

== Presidents ==
The following people have served as president and CEO of HEQCO:

- Malcolm Butler: August 2025
- Janice M. Deakin: August 2020 – July 2025
- David Trick (Interim): September 2019 – July 2020
- Harvey P. Weingarten: July 2010 – September 2019
- Ken Norrie (acting): April 2010 – July 2010
- James Downey: January 2007 – March 2010

== Board ==
HEQCO is governed by a board of directors who are responsible for setting the overall strategic direction of the council as well as ensuring that its activities remain aligned with its mandate. Board members are appointed by the Lieutenant Governor in Council pursuant to the Higher Education Council of Ontario Act, 2005.

=== Board chairs ===
- Armand La Barge (acting; 2025)
- Shelley McGill (acting; 2023–2025)
- Karin Schnarr (2022–2023)
- Pat Lang (acting; 2021)
- Sue Herbert (acting; 2021)
- A. Scott Carson (acting; 2020–2021)
- Denis Mayer (2019–2020)
- Nobina Robinson (2019)
- Alastair Summerlee (2015–2018)
- Cindy Dundon Hazell (interim; 2014–2015)
- Elizabeth Dowdeswell (2012–2014)
- Frank Iacobucci, C.C., Q.C. (2006–2012)

== Research ==
The Higher Education Quality Council of Ontario employs a multifaceted research approach with a view to developing meaningful policy recommendations and publishing reports and other publications that inform the postsecondary education community in Ontario, Canada and around the world. To date, more than 275 research papers and reports have been produced, with new reports continually being published. The council's research publications are available on their website.

HEQCO's current research priorities include:

- Improving access to higher education for non-traditional and underrepresented students.
- Ensuring that students graduate with the knowledge and skills they need to succeed in the workplace and in life through the assessment of skills and competencies.
- Enhancing academic quality and choice by assessing the sustainability of postsecondary institutions and the sector. This includes examining approaches for differentiation among higher-education institutions and exploring options for outcomes-based funding.

== Hosted events ==
The council has hosted workshops, conferences, webinars and other events to further its research agenda and contribute to the higher-education sector. HEQCO has hosted ten conferences between 2011 and 2025.
