= Richard J. Van Loon =

Richard Van Loon (born 1940) is a former Canadian civil servant and ex-president of Carleton University in Ottawa, Ontario.

Van Loon was the first president of Carleton who was also a Carleton alumnus. He got his Bachelor of Science in chemistry there in 1961, as well as an MA in 1965. He completed a PhD in political studies at Queen's University in 1968, and for several years he taught that subject at Queen's, Carleton and the University of Ottawa.

His career in the federal civil service has included stints in the Department of Energy and the Treasury Board. He has been an associate deputy minister of the federal departments of Health and Indian Affairs. source

When he was appointed president of Carleton in August 1996, Van Loon inherited a school $12.9-million in debt whose enrolment and retention rates were beginning to decline. The "open-door" admissions policy of one of his predecessors, William Edwin Beckel, had earned Carleton a reputation as "Last Chance U," but his immediate predecessor, Robin Hugh Farquhar, had managed by the end of his term to get Board and Senate approval for an increase in admission standards. Consequently, during Van Loon's first two years in office, although Carleton's accumulated deficit ballooned to almost $30 million, its entrance averages rose and he organized a massive faculty restructuring to focus on two core academic strengths: public affairs and high-technology programs. Van Loon's cutbacks also phased out several humanities and foreign-language departments, which aroused large but short-lived protests by the faculty, and by the end of his presidency the University's debt was just under $20 million.

At the recommendation of Carleton's athletic department, Van Loon made the controversial decision to shut down the university's football program in March 1999.

In 2001, Van Loon was appointed for a second term by Carleton's board of governors. During this term, he helped administer a $280-million construction boom to prepare for the arrival of Ontario's double cohort of high-school graduates. By the time his second term ended in July 2005, Carleton's $30-million debt had been almost cut in half. source

Van Loon's successor was David W. Atkinson, formerly president of Brock University.

Van Loon is co-author of Academic Reform: Policy Options for Improving the Quality and Cost-Effectiveness of Undergraduate Education in Ontario (with Ian D. Clark and David Trick, 2011).
