= Don Drummond (economist) =

Canadian economist

Don Drummond, OOnt is a noted Canadian economist, having served extensively in the federal Department of Finance Canada, as Chief Economist at Toronto-Dominion Bank and as a scholar at Queen's University. He is known for his wide contributions to public policy in Canada and extensive citation on economic issues.

== Early life and education ==
Drummond was born and raised in Victoria, British Columbia, where he graduated from the University of Victoria. He subsequently received his M.A. in economics from Queen's University in 1977, and was awarded a Doctor of Laws honoris causa by Queen's University in June 2010. On Tuesday, June 9, 2015, the University of Victoria conferred an Honorary Doctor of Laws (LLD).

== Federal Department of Finance ==
Drummond joined the federal Department of Finance where he served for 23 years, holding a series of progressively more senior positions in the areas of economic analysis and forecasting, fiscal policy and tax policy. He served as Assistant Deputy Minister of Fiscal Policy and Economic Analysis, Assistant Deputy Minister of Tax Policy & Legislation and Associate Deputy Minister. In this latter position, Drummond was responsible for economic analysis, fiscal policy, tax policy, social policy and federal-provincial relations. As well, Drummond coordinated the planning of the annual federal budgets. Paul Martin, Finance Minister and later Prime Minister, called Drummond "one of the most principled and imaginative public servants with whom I have ever worked".

== Chief Economist at TD Bank ==
Drummond was Senior Vice President and Chief Economist for the TD Bank from 2000 to 2010. He led TD Economics' work in analyzing and forecasting economic performance in Canada and abroad. From 2001 until his retirement, he headed government relations for the bank.

He was regarded as having transformed the bank's economics department into a "think-tank on topics of national importance". Many of Drummond's reports at TD were credited with significantly influencing government's policy decisions, including the reported impact of his 2008 report "Time for a vision of Ontario's economy" (co-authored with Derek Burleton) in shaping the 2009 Ontario Budget and convincing the provincial government to harmonize its sales tax with the federal Goods and Services Tax.

During this tenure at TD, he participated in a variety of public policy initiatives, including serving as an advisory panel member of Bob Rae's review of Ontario post-secondary education (the "Rae Report"), serving on the Task Force for Modernizing Income Security for Working-Age Adults of the Toronto City Summit Alliance (now, the Greater Toronto CivicAction Alliance), chairing the Labour Market Ministers’ Advisory Panel on Labour Market Information, and co-chairing a Toronto Financial Services Alliance Working Group to establish a global risk management institute in Canada.

Drummond also served as a member of the National Statistics Council and was openly critical of the federal government's 2010 decision to eliminate the long-form census for the Canada 2011 Census without consulting the advisory body. In July 2010, he testified to the Canadian House of Commons Standing Committee on Industry, Science and Technology on the planned replacement of the mandatory long-form with a voluntary National Household Survey, stating: "I think the data could actually be worse than not having anything. It could be misleading. You may be making misleading inferences because you don't actually know how to properly weight the groups that might be underrepresented."

== Fellowship at Queen's University ==
He was appointed the Donald Matthews Faculty Fellowship on Global Public Policy at Queen's University in June 2010, and co-chair of the C. D. Howe Institute’s Fiscal and Tax Competitiveness Council in March 2011.

He is spearheading a research initiative to investigate the causes of and policies to mitigate Canada's ailing productivity performance.

== Drummond Commission ==
In its 2011 Budget, the Ontario provincial government appointed Drummond to head the Commission on the Reform of Ontario’s Public Services (the "Drummond Commission") to "examine long-term, fundamental changes to the way government works" and explore "which areas of service delivery are core to the Ontario government’s mandate, which areas could be delivered more efficiently by another entity and how to get better value for taxpayers’ money in delivering public services."

The report of "Drummond Commission" was received on February 15, 2012. Under status quo assumptions, the report forecasted that Ontario's budget deficit would more than double to $30.2 billion in 2017–18 and net public debt would reach $411.4 billion, equivalent to just under 51 per cent of the province's GDP. Moreover, the commission warned that: "We can no longer assume a resumption of Ontario’s traditional strong economic growth and the continued prosperity on which the province has built its public services. Nor can we count on steady, dependable revenue growth to finance government programs. Unless policy-makers act swiftly and boldly to prevent such an outcome, Ontario faces a series of deficits that would undermine the province’s economic and social future."

The report broadly urged the Ontario government to "not simply cut costs" and "avoid across-the-board cuts" but rather "give priority to programs and activities that invest in the future rather than serve the status quo" and develop "evidence-based" policy, including ongoing data-based evaluation.

The 543-page report included 362 specific recommendations for restoring Ontario's fiscal balance by 2017, including: various measures to contain health care cost growth at 2.5% annually; limiting spending growth to 1% and 1.5% respectively for primary and postsecondary education (compared with current 3 to 5%), including ending full-day kindergarten and increasing class sizes; elimination or reduction of sector-specific business subsidies, including the feed-in-tariff program subsidizing solar and wind generation; reducing public sector pension benefits rather than increasing contributions; major reforms to provincial agencies and Crown corporations to enhance revenue streams; and investigation into increased user fees for water, electricity and parking.

In 2015, he was made a member of the Order of Ontario.
