= Robbert Hartog =

Canadian economist (1919–2008)

Robbert Hartog CM
- Born: January 28, 1919; Nijmegen
- Died: January 27, 2008 (aged 88)

Academic background
- Education: University of Toronto

Academic work
- Discipline: Economist, business leader and philanthropist
- Awards: Bronze Wolf

Robbert Hartog CM (January 28, 1919 – January 27, 2008), was an economist, business leader and philanthropist in Midland, Ontario, Canada.

== Background ==
Born and raised in Nijmegen as the son of Arthur Hartog and Jenny Catz, Hartog immigrated to Canada in 1940/1941. He enrolled at the University of Toronto and graduated with a master's degree in Economics in 1942.(?) He immediately returned to Europe to join the Allied war effort serving in the Netherlands Forces as an economist, and helped bring the financial situation back in balance. Hartog asked to be demobilized in Canada after his tour of duty, and returned to settle in Canada in 1946, when he founded Kindred Industries Limited, which became a multi-national corporation eventually employing 1,400 people. In the 1970s, Hartog merged Wallaceburg Brass with Kindred Industries, becoming the founding Chair and CEO of Waltec Incorporated in Midland. In 1984, the year he sold the company, Waltec was listed by Canadian Business as one of the 25 most profitable companies in Canada.

In the book "The First 25 Years of Fairfax" it is explained that Robbert Hartog was instrumental in the founding of the group of insurance companies that would go on to become Fairfax Financial.

Hartog was an active supporter of the Boy Scouts, served as the Chairman of the Educational Methods Group of the World Scout Committee, and was awarded the 147th Bronze Wolf in 1981, the only distinction of the World Organization of the Scout Movement, awarded by the World Scout Committee for exceptional services to world Scouting.

Hartog was a donor to philanthropic causes. The Georgian College Robbert Hartog Midland Campus is named after him. He served as Prssident of the Midland, Ontario YMCA Men's Club in 1969, and was a benefactor of the YMCA. He also supported Canadian Executive Service Organization, The Wye Marsh, World Wildlife Federation, Canadian Crossroads International, and University of Waterloo.
