= Georgian College =

College of Applied Arts and Technology in Ontario, Canada

Coordinates: 44°24′44.29″N 79°39′40.08″W

- Motto: Accelerate your success
- Type: Public
- Established: 1967
- Academic affiliations: CCAA, ACCC, CBIE
- President: Kevin Weaver
- Students: 13,500 full-time, including 5,500 international (2025: 7,028 FTEs)
- Location: 1 Georgian Drive, Barrie, Ontario, Canada
- Campus: Urban
- Colours: Blue & green
- Nickname: Grizzlies
- Mascot: Grizzly Growler
- Website: georgiancollege.ca

Georgian College is a College of Applied Arts and Technology in Ontario, Canada. It has more than 13,500 full-time students, including over 5,500 international students from 92 countries.

== History ==
The college was established during the formation of Ontario's college system in 1967. Colleges of Applied Arts and Technology were established on May 21, 1965, when the Ontario system of public colleges was created.

== Programs ==
Georgian College offers academic upgrading, apprenticeship training, certificate, diploma, advanced diploma, graduate certificate, degree programs and part-time studies.

- Academic areas:
  - Automotive Business School of Canada
  - School of Animal Health
  - School of Art, Design and Creative Industries
  - School of Business Management
  - School of Community Safety
  - School of Computer Technology
  - School of Engineering, Technology and Applied Sciences
  - School of Health Sciences
  - School of Hospitality and Culinary Arts
  - School of Human Services
  - School of Liberal Studies
  - School of Nursing
  - School of Oral Health
  - School of Recreation, Sports and Fitness
  - School of Rehabilitation Sciences
  - School of Skilled Trades and Apprenticeship
  - School of Wellness and Esthetics

Classes are small (25 people on average).

Georgian offers the following degrees:

- Honours Bachelor of Business Administration (Automotive Management) (Co-op)
- Honours Bachelor of Counselling Psychology
- Honours Bachelor of Interior Design (Co-op)
- Honours Bachelor of Police Studies (Co-op)
- Honours Bachelor of Science – Nursing
- Honours Bachelor of Science – Nursing RPN to BScN Advanced Standing Pathway (Bridge)

=== Entrepreneurship ===
The Henry Bernick Entrepreneurship Centre, at the college's Barrie Campus, assists entrepreneurs in four main areas: training, connections, funding, and mentorship.

Georgian also trains students in social entrepreneurship. In 2018, it became the first college in Canada to be designated a "changemaker college" by Ashoka U.

=== Co-op education ===
6,000+ employers partner with Georgian to offer student work experiences (such as PowerStream, Algoma Central Corporation, Royal Victoria Regional Health Centre, Magna International, and more). Georgian was the first Ontario college with programs accredited by Co-operative Education and Work-Integrated Learning Canada; this represents the highest standard of achievement for co-op programs in Canada. Co-op work terms can lead to full-time positions after graduation. Students may opt to be their own boss and start a business as part of Georgian's eCo-op (entrepreneurship co-op) program.

Georgian has maintained a high graduate employment rate for more than a decade. According to 2022–23 Key Performance Indicators (KPI), 90.3% of Georgian graduates found work within six months – well above the provincial average.

== Scholarships and bursaries ==
Georgian offers more than $4.5 million in bursaries and scholarships to students each year. Students can apply online.

The Government of Canada sponsors an Aboriginal Bursaries Search Tool that lists over 950 scholarships, bursaries, bursaries and other incentives offered by governments, universities and industry to support Aboriginal postsecondary participation. Georgian College scholarships for Aboriginal, First Nations and Métis students include the Casino Rama Aboriginal Tourism Award, Casino Rama Tourism Graduate Award, Monague Native Crafts Ltd. Award, Crossworks Manufacturing Native Education Award, Randy Anderson Memorial Award, New VR Award, Janet Stinson Memorial Award, and Native Education – Community and Social Development Graduate Award.

== Campuses ==
=== Barrie ===
Georgian College's main campus is located on a 140-acre (57 ha) site on the northeast edge of Barrie.

The Barrie Campus is home to the Sadlon Centre for Health, Wellness and Sciences. Opened in 2011, this $65-million, 165,000-square-foot (15,300 m^{2}) facility has allowed Georgian to double its enrolment in health and wellness programs to 3,000 students and allow students to pursue health sciences-related certificates, diplomas and degrees, including advanced degree programs. It is home to a variety of health care teaching clinics open to the public, as well as laboratories and classrooms.

The new Peter B. Moore Advanced Technology Centre is a $30-million, 56,000-square-foot facility at the Barrie Campus. It is home to the first engineering degrees in Central Ontario, Lakehead-Georgian degree-diploma programs, and labs with emerging robotics, mechatronics, and manufacturing technology. It has the only anechoic chamber in the region. Students and faculty use the space to partner with industry and community partners on research projects.

Georgian also offers graphic design and photography programs in downtown Barrie, at the Arch and Helen Brown Design and Digital Arts Centre. A bus runs regularly between Georgian's downtown Barrie and north Barrie locations.

The Barrie Campus offers an on-campus residence. The eight-floor residence houses approximately 525 students, which includes 16 live-in residence life staff (15 Resident Attendants and a Manager of Residence Life). There are also two dual bedroom rooms for students with disabilities. During the summer, this residence becomes a summer accommodation facility and hotel, although a few students remain in the building for the summer semester.

=== Owen Sound ===
The Owen Sound Campus has over 1,000 full-time students and offers a wide variety of programs, from skilled trades, to early childhood education, to practical nursing.

The campus has an on-site residence that houses 61 students in townhouse-style buildings. Most residence suites accommodate four students with each student having a private bedroom.

Among the most notable features of the campus are its marine training facilities. The Algoma Central Corporation Marine Emergency Duties (MED) Centre, which opened in October 2016 is a $7.5 million, 13,600-square-foot facility and a key part of the college's Marine Studies programs.

The renovated $8.5-million Centre for Marine Training and Research 20,000-square-foot (1,900 m^{2}) is the most technologically advanced marine training centre in the country. The CMTR is used to certify professionals already in the marine industry and to train students in the Marine Engineering Technician and Marine Technology – Navigation programs. The college also offers a graduate certificate in Marine Engineering Management.

=== Midland ===
The Robbert Hartog Midland Campus provides education and training opportunities to North Simcoe County. Campus features include 39,000 square feet of dedicated shop space, Indigenous Resource Centre, a cafeteria, and Recreational Boating Centre of Excellence. It has several hundred full-time students and focuses on skilled trades education including electrical, mechanical, marine engine, welding and plumbing programs.

=== Orangeville ===
The Orangeville Campus was established in 1988. Campus features include a computer lab, student lounge, videoconferencing capabilities and nursing lab.

== Automotive Business School of Canada ==
Georgian College is also home to the Automotive Business School of Canada, the only one of its kind in the country. The school offers a two-year diploma and a four-year Honours Bachelor of Business Administration degree, specializing in the automotive industry. Students host North America's largest outdoor student-run auto show every year in June. The Automotive Dealership Management graduate certificate builds on professionals' existing experience and helps them upgrade their skills.

== Notable alumni ==
- Jon Montgomery, Olympic gold medalist (skeleton racing) and television host

== See also ==
- Georgian College Auto Show
- Canadian government scientific research organizations
- Canadian industrial research and development organizations
- Canadian Interuniversity Sport
- Canadian university scientific research organizations
- Higher education in Ontario
- List of colleges in Ontario
- List of universities in Ontario
