= Student financial aid in Canada =

Assistance for paying for education in Canada

Student loans in Canada are government-supported financial aid programs designed to help post-secondary students cover the costs of their education. The federal government funds the Canada Student Loan Program (CSLP), which works in collaboration with provinces and territories. Some provinces operate their own student loan programs, while others integrate with the CSLP for streamlined assistance. In addition to government-backed loans, Canadian banks offer commercial loans tailored for students in professional programs.

== Government loans ==
Canadian citizens, permanent residents of Canada living in any province for over a year, and protected persons are normally eligible for loans provided by the federal government, through the CSLP, in addition to loans provided by their province of residence.

Loans issued to full-time students are interest free while a student is in full-time studies. Students receiving a Canada Student Loan (CSL) for the first time on or after August 1, 1995, are eligible for up to 340 weeks (~6.5 years) of interest-free status on their loan balance. Students in doctoral programs are eligible for an additional 60 weeks, up to 400 weeks (~7.5 years). Students with permanent disabilities and students who received their first CSL prior to August 1, 1995, are eligible for up to 520 weeks of assistance (10 years), though certain provincial loans may have different limits.

Whether in receipt of student loans or not, students in full-time study are not required to repay their student loans. Depending on the issuing jurisdiction, interest begins to accumulate immediately upon leaving studies.

Assistance is available for students in part-time studies, with rules slightly different based on the program. Beginning January 1, 2012, the Government of Canada eliminated interest on part-time student loans while borrowers are in-study.

Student loan borrowers begin repaying their student loans six months after they graduate or leave school, although interest may begin after the Period of Study End Date. Grants may supplement loans to aid students who face particular barriers to accessing post-secondary education, such as students with permanent disabilities or students from low-income families.

Canada Student Loans of up to $210 per week of full-time study or 60% of the student's assessed need (the lesser of these) can be issued per loan year (August 1–July 31). Loans issued through provincial programs will normally provide students with enough funding to cover the balance of their assessed need. Part-time loans cannot exceed $10,000 in principal at any given time.

== History ==
Prior to 1964, the national student loan program was known as the Dominion-Provincial Student Loan Program. This program was a matching grant partnership system between the federal and provincial governments. It was started in 1939 and ended with the start to the CSLP in 1964.

Some text from the Department of Human Resources and Social Development Canada:

The CSLP was created in 1964. Since its inception, the Program has supplemented the financial resources available to eligible students from other sources to assist in their pursuit of post-secondary education. Between 1964 and 1995, loans were provided by financial institutions to post-secondary students who were approved to receive financial assistance. The financial institutions also administered the loan repayment process. In return, the Government of Canada guaranteed each Canada Student Loan that was issued, by reimbursing the financial institution the full amount of loans that went into default.

In 1995, several important changes were made to Canada Student Loans. First, the Canada Student Financial Assistance Act was proclaimed, replacing the existing Canada Student Loans Act (which does not remain in force to this day) reflecting the changing needs of the parties involved in the loan process, including the conferred responsibility of the collection of defaulted loans to the banks themselves. The Government of Canada developed a formalized "risk-shared" agreement with several financial institutions, whereby the institution would assume responsibility for the possible risk of defaulted loans in return for a fixed payment from the Government which correlated with the amount of loans that were expected to be, or were, in default in each calendar year. During this period, the weekly federal loan amount was increased to a maximum of $165.

On July 31, 2000, the risk-shared arrangement between the Government of Canada and participating financial institutions came to an end. The Government of Canada now directly finances all new loans issued on or after August 1, 2000. The administration of Canada Student Loans has become the responsibility of the National Student Loans Service Centre (NSLSC). There were two divisions of the NSLSC, one to manage loans for students attending public institutions and the other to administer loans for students attending private institutions, but these two centers were merged into one. Defaulted Canada Student Loans disbursed under this new regime are now collected by the Canada Revenue Agency which, by Order in Council dated August 1, 2005, became responsible for the collection of all debts due under programs administered by Human Resources and Social Development Canada.

Due to the close nature of the CSLP and the provincial student loan programs, the changes in 1995 and 2000 were largely mirrored by the provincial programs. As a result of these changes, students who attended school before and after these transition years may find that they have up to 6 different loans to manage (pre-1995 federal & provincial; 1995-2000 federal & provincial; and post-2000 federal & provincial). The extent to which this is possible depends largely on a student's province of residence.

== Financial aid programs in Canada by province and territory ==
- Alberta: Alberta Student Aid
- British Columbia: StudentAid BC
- Manitoba: Manitoba student aid
- Ontario: Ontario Student Assistance Program
- New Brunswick: Canada Student Loan and New Brunswick Student Loan
- Newfoundland and Labrador: Newfoundland and Labrador Student Aid
- Northwest Territories: NWT Student Financial Assistance
- Nova Scotia: Nova Scotia Student Assistance
- Nunavut: Financial Assistance for Nunavut Students (FANS)
- Prince Edward Island: PEI Student Loan
- Quebec: Aide financière aux études
- Saskatchewan: Saskatchewan Student Loans
- Yukon: Yukon Student Financial Assistance

== Students in professional programs ==
Most charter banks in Canada have specific programs for students in professional programs (e.g., medicine) that can provide more funds than usual in the form of a line of credit, sometimes with lower interest rates as well. Students may also be eligible for government loans that are interest free while in school on top of this line of credit, as private loans do not count against government loans/grants.

The March 2011 federal budget announced a Canada Student Loan forgiveness programme for medical and nursing students to complement other health human resources strategies to expand the provision of primary health services. The programme is meant to encourage and support new family physicians, nurse practitioners and nurses to practise in underserved rural or remote communities of the country, including communities that provide health services to First Nations and Inuit populations.

== National Student Loan Service Centre ==
The National Student Loans Service Centre (NSLSC) is an agency created by the Canada Student Loans Program (CSLP) where Canadian Federal loan holders manage their student loan. The NSLSC manages CSLP (Federal) loans as well as provincially-integrated loans for the following provinces: British Columbia, Manitoba, Ontario, New Brunswick, and Newfoundland and Labrador, and Saskatchewan.

The NSLSC website (nslsc.ca) can be used to maintain student loan holders files, confirm enrolment, check disbursement status, apply for the Repayment Assistance Plan, as well as make payments on their loans.

== Loan administration and repayment ==
The Canada Student Loan Program (sometimes referred to as the National Student Loan) is administered by National Student Loan Service Centre a part of Human Resources and Social (Skills) Development Canada (HRSDC). Students have the choice of opting for a fixed interest rate of prime interest rate, or a floating interest rate. Newfoundland and Labrador and Prince Edward Island were the only provinces where there was no interest on the provincial loan, but as of March 28, 2014, the government of Nova Scotia also eliminated interest for all graduates who entered repayment after Nov. 1, 2007. The government of British Columbia eliminated interest on its student loans on February 19, 2019. The Canadian federal government eliminated interest on its student loans as of April 1, 2023.

In September 2010 the amount of student loans owed to the Government of Canada surpassed $15 billion.

== Repayment assistance ==
CSLP offers a number of programs to assist students who find themselves facing financial difficulty during repayment. These are provided to government-sponsored student loanholders. Among these programs are:

Repayment Assistance
Repayment Assistance is designed to help students meet repayment obligations if they are temporarily unable to make payments on their government student loans because of unemployment or low income. Repayment Assistance is granted for periods of six months. Some rules, such as Canadian residency, may apply. Once approved for Repayment Assistance, borrowers will be assessed for an affordable payment amount which may be zero or more. The Federal and/or provincial government will then assist in paying interest and/or principal so long as the borrower continues to be approved for the program. Borrowers can apply online on the NSLSC website.

Revision of Terms
Revision of Terms is a feature that provides students with the flexibility to manage loan repayment in a way that is responsive to individual situations. It can be used to decrease monthly payments by increasing the repayment period (from the standard 11.5 years up to 15 years) should a student find the standard terms difficult to maintain. It can also be used to increase loan payments by reducing the repayment period, allowing more rapid repayment of a loan.

Severe Permanent Disability Benefit
Along with Repayment Assistance for borrowers with permanent disabilities, the Severe Permanent Disability Benefit is an additional program for borrowers with disabilities. It allows for the elimination of debt for students who are experiencing exceptional financial hardship due to a severe permanent disability.
