= Ontario Student Assistance Program =

Financial aid program in Ontario

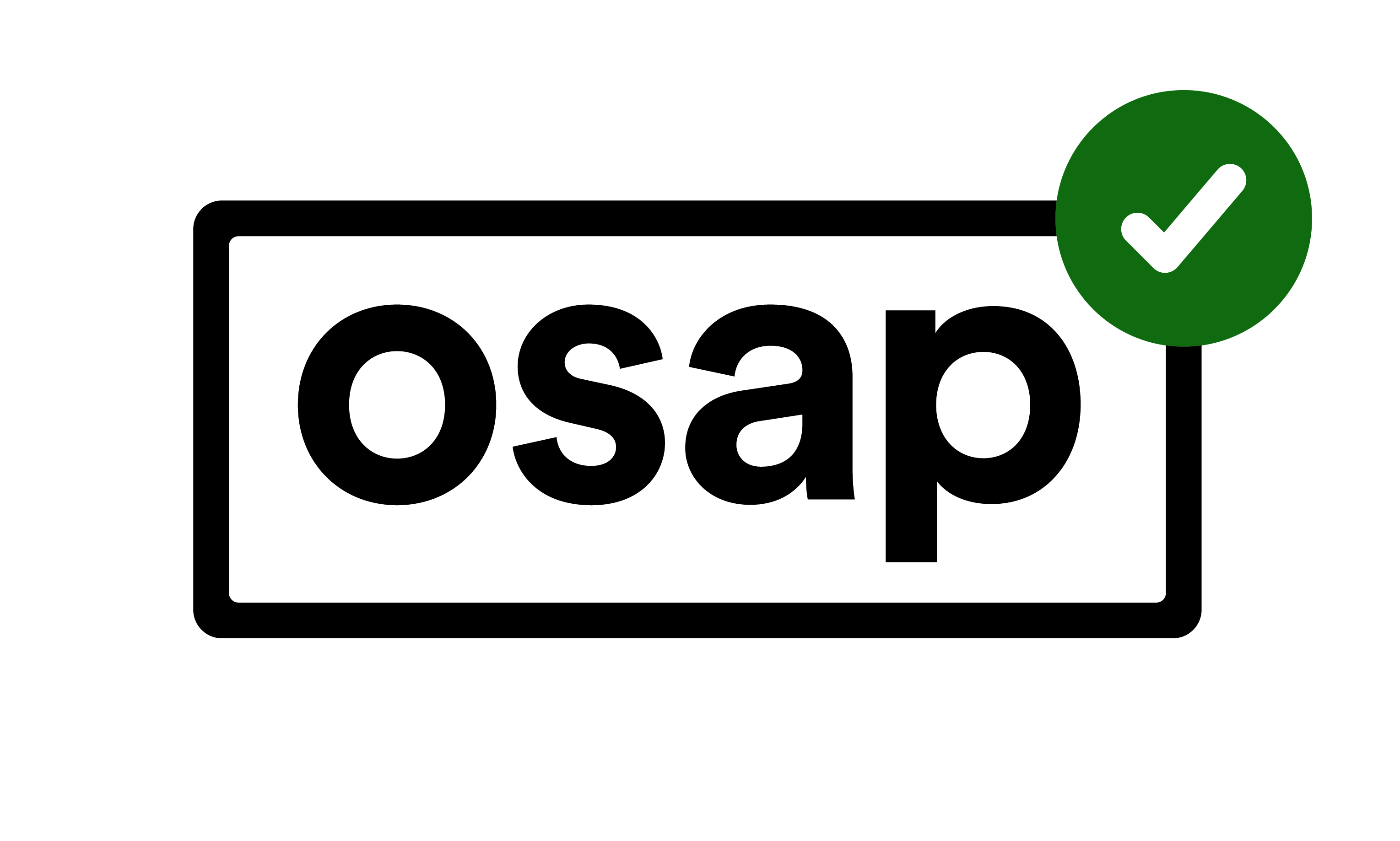
OSAP's logo

The Ontario Student Assistance Program (OSAP; French: Régime d'aide financière aux étudiantes et étudiants de l'Ontario, RAFEO) is a provincial financial aid program that offers grants and loans for Ontario students to pay for their post-secondary education. OSAP determines the amount of money that a student is eligible to receive by considering factors such as tuition, course load, and the financial resources of the student. More than 380,000 students – more than half of all full-time Ontario students – received student financial aid in 2014-15.

In 2016, the Ontario government announced changes to OSAP that aimed to make post-secondary education more affordable for lower income families. Starting in the 2017–18 school year, these changes increased the proportion of financial aid in the form of grants, and completely covered the cost of average tuition for families earning less than $50,000 per year.

In 2019, the Ontario government announced cuts to OSAP in conjunction with a 10 percent reduction in post-secondary tuition fees. These changes would, starting in the 2019–20 school year, reduce the family income threshold for grants from $175,000 to $140,000, require that the loan-to-grant ratio for funding given to students be at least 50 percent loan, and remove the six-month interest-free grace period for the Ontario portion of loans following graduation.

== Background ==
In 1966, the Province of Ontario Student Award Program (POSAP) was launched by Bill Davis, Ontario's Minister of University Affairs, in conjunction with the new Canada Student Loans Program to provide non-repayable provincial grants.

The initial reaction was largely negative as the new application and administration was more cumbersome and restrictive than the prior system. University of Toronto and Ryerson students protested and demanded the government increase grant amounts, simplify the application and allow student aid offices to adjust individual awards.

The protests were largely successful and, in 1967, the province removed questions about parental debt, insurance and mortgages, the need assessment was amended to exempt some income, and students were considered independent after three years of studies.

Over time, the "P" was dropped and was re-branded as the Ontario Student Assistance Program (OSAP).

Now delivered through the authority of the Ministry of Training, Colleges and Universities Act, 1990, the Minister has the authority to "make grants, awards and loans to students of universities, colleges of applied arts and technology or other post-secondary institutions".

Since the Dominion-Provincial Student Assistance Program (DPSAP) in the 1930s, Ontario has administered an integrated federal-provincial student aid program. The federal government pays Ontario $16 million to compensate for this administration. In 1998, the federal government also integrated loan repayment with Ontario and other jurisdictions to allow for a single loan repayment and relief administration.

== Legislative history ==
=== 2003–2005 ===
The Ontario Liberal Party was elected with a platform commitment to a two-year tuition freeze, expanded loan eligibility and tuition waivers for "the neediest 10 percent of students."

At the time, Ontario student aid did not have any up-front grants, though it had a long-standing loan remission policy through the Ontario Student Opportunity Grant (OSOG) which capped total loans (federal and provincial) at $7,000 per year (maximum aid was $9,350).

The government subsequently implemented a two-year tuition freeze beginning in September 2004.

The government also launched a review of the post-secondary education system to be led by former Premier Bob Rae, which subsequently called for free tuition for low-income students and a new tuition framework that provides for "predictable, transparent and affordable" increases.

In response, the government's Reaching Higher plan began in 2005 providing for a $6.2 billion investment in postsecondary education, including a target postsecondary attainment rate of 70% and doubling funding for OSAP. This included the introduction of up-front grants for low-income students and higher loan limits. In September 2005, Millennium-Ontario Access Grants of up to $6,000 were introduced for first-year dependent students, and $3,000 Ontario Access Grants for second-year students.

=== 2006–2010 ===
In 2006, the tuition freeze was lifted, and a four-year framework was implemented, which was subsequently extended three more years out to 2013:

- entering Arts/Science students could increase by up to 4.5%.
- entering graduate/professional students could increase by up to 8%.
- all continuing students by up to 4%.
- combined an overall cap of 5%.

Ontario tuition rates were regulated by the Ministry of Training, Colleges and Universities through the Tuition Fee Framework Guidelines, which provides that any tuition increases beyond the guidelines result in dollar-for-dollar reduction of provincial funding to public universities and colleges. The Framework applies to all students that receive provincial funding, excluding international students and certain full-cost-recovery professional programs.

Ontario Liberals were re-elected in 2007 with platform commitments for two new up-front grants: the Distance Grant (to support those with need travelling long distances to attend PSE) and the Textbook and Technology Grant ($150 flat grant not tied to OSAP need).

=== 2011 ===
The Budget before the 2011 election introduced a six-month interest-free grace period, doubled the student earnings income exemption, and increased student loan limits while increasing the OSOG threshold from $7,000 to $7,300.

In the October 2011 election, the Liberals were re-elected with a minority government on the signature platform commitment to "support all middle-class Ontario families with a 30% across-the-board post-secondary undergraduate tuition grant. That means – every year – the families of five out of six students will save $1,600 per student in university and $730 per student in college." It also included a commitment to keep OSOG debt cap at $7,300 and added an additional six-month grace period for graduates who work in the not-for-profit sector.

=== 2012–2015 ===
The 30% Off Ontario Tuition grant was launched in January 2012, only for dependent students in first-entry programs, offset in part by the elimination of the Textbook and Technology Grant and some smaller merit-based programs.

A revised four-year tuition framework was announced in 2013 that dropped the overall tuition increase cap from 5% to 3% and the professional/graduate cap from 8% to 5%. The additional six-month grace period was also extended to entrepreneurs starting a new business in 2013.

The Liberals were re-elected to a majority government in 2014 under Kathleen Wynne with its only post-secondary platform commitment being to continue the 30% Off Ontario Tuition grant.

In their 2015 Budget, the government made a number of need assessment changes in concert with the federal changes: a fixed student contribution, eliminating the vehicle asset test and indexed maximum student aid levels to inflation while increasing the OSOG debt cap to $7,400.

=== 2016–2018 ===
In the 2016 Budget, the Ontario government announced an overhaul of student financial assistance in Ontario. This included eliminating tuition and post-secondary education tax credits and multiple OSAP grants (Ontario Access Grant, Ontario Student Opportunity Grant, Ontario Distance Grant, 30% Off Ontario Tuition grant, Child Care Bursary) and pooling the associated funding into a single new Ontario Student Grant. The new grant was designed to cover average tuition costs for all those under $50,000 of family income (or $30,000 for independent students) regardless of assessed need, with a sliding scale above that up to $160,000 receiving 30% of tuition costs. The result was that the proportion of Ontario aid provided in the form of non-repayable grants increased from 60% grant/40% loan in 2016–17 to 98% grant/2% loan in 2017–18.

=== 2019 ===
A new PC government was elected in June 2018, which announced significant changes to OSAP in January 2019. It included a 10% tuition fee reduction for all programs in 2019–20, followed by a freeze in 2020–21. It also cut the OSAP budget from approximately $2 billion to $1.4 billion, making significant changes to the program including:

- changing eligibility requirements for the Ontario Student Grant to only be provided up to assessed need and reducing income cut-offs to about $140,000 of family income.
- requiring that at least 10% of assessed need be provided as loan for those with family income under $50,000.
- requiring that at least 50% of assessed need be provided as loan for those in second-entry or out-of-province programs.
- increasing the fixed student contribution to $3,600 from $3,000.
- increasing expected parental contributions.
- making the annual $500 computer allowance one-time.
- changing the definition of independent student from four to six years out of high school; and
- having interest accrue on provincial loans during the six-month grace period after graduation.

=== 2026 ===
In early 2026, the Ford government announced changes to OSAP alongside billions in new funding for Ontario's financially struggling colleges and universities. The government announced the end of the tuition freeze for public colleges and universities, allowing them to raise fees by up to two percent per year over three years, and announced changes to the composition of OSAP funding, with the proportion of funding coming from grants reduced from a maximum of 85% down to a maximum of 25% and the proportion of funding coming from loans increased from a minimum of 15% to a minimum of 75%. The changes saw protests from students across the province.

== Financial resources ==
- Student fixed contribution – an amount that students are expected to contribute toward their education costs from their savings or earnings. The fixed contribution is $3,600 for a two-term study period for the Ontario assessment but is reduced on a sliding income scale down to the low-income threshold for a minimum of $1,500 for the federal assessment. Contribution is waived for students with children, on social assistance, Crown wards, those with a permanent disability or self-identify as Indigenous.
- Scholarships/Bursaries/Awards – amount above $1,800 per year
- Study period income – exempt in federal assessment; amount over $11,200 per year in Ontario assessment
- Parental contribution (for single dependent students) – calculated based on annual discretionary income, which is net parental income (after taxes/deductions) minus a moderate living allowance – different formulas federally and provincially.

== Eligibility ==
To be eligible for OSAP, students must be a Canadian citizen, permanent resident or a protected person under the Immigration and Refugee Protection Act; and

They also must be an Ontario resident, meaning:

- Ontario is the most recent province in which the student resided for 12 consecutive months, not including time as a full-time post-secondary student;
- if the student is married/common-law, Ontario is the most recent province in which the student's spouse resided for 12 consecutive months, not including time as a full-time post-secondary student; or
- if the student is a single dependent student, Ontario is the most recent province in which the student's parent(s) resided for at least 12 consecutive months.

=== Student categories ===
Each student is assigned a student category based on their personal circumstances:

- Single dependent – considered dependent on parental support unless they meet at least one of the categories below
- Single independent – considered to have established financial independence from their parents if they meet at least one of following:
  - out of high school for six or more years;
  - working 30+ hours per week for at least two years in a row while not being a full-time student;
  - both parents are deceased, Crown ward or receiving allowance support through a Children's Aid Society; or
  - widowed, divorced or separated with no children.
- Married or common-law (lived continuously for minimum of three years or as parents)
- Sole-support parent (single with custody and responsibility of one or more children)

=== Student self-identification ===
Students can also optionally self-identify as the following:

- Permanent disability (fixed student contribution is waived; assessed for Canada Student Grant for Students with a Permanent Disability; and eligible for full-time OSAP while taking 40–59% of course load)
- Crown ward (fixed student contribution is waived; assessed for Living and Learning Grant)
- Indigenous (fixed student contribution is waived)
- Francophone (to take into consideration studying in French for the Ontario Student Grant-Distance)

=== New Canadians ===
For new Canadian citizens, permanent residents and protected persons who have resided in Canada for less than 12 months, a residency review is available to determine the province from which they would be eligible to receive student aid.

=== Mature students ===
Students who finished high school four or more years ago can qualify for more grants to go back to school.

== Registration and application ==
In order to apply for funding consideration from OSAP, students first register as a new user online at Ontario.ca/osap. Students will create an OSAP profile and get an OSAP Access Number (OAN). The OAN will be used to log in to the OSAP portal to review current applications and submit future OSAP applications.

=== Deadlines ===
- Full-time OSAP application deadline: 60 days prior to end of study period.
- Full-time OSAP supplementary documentation deadline: 40 days prior to end of study period.
- Full-time Interest Free Status Form submissions: Submission begins 15 days prior to start of full-time study period and the submission deadline is 25 days before end of full-time study period.
- Part-time OSAP application deadline: Deadline to apply and submit all required documentation is six weeks prior to end of term.
  - Part-time applications must be submitted term-by-term.

== Ontario Student Access Guarantee ==
If OSAP does not cover all of the expenses that directly relate to a student's program (books, tuition, mandatory fees), and they still require additional financial assistance, public colleges and universities in Ontario are required to provide financial help.

This money could include:

- bursaries
- scholarships
- work study programs
- summer employment programs

== Financial Aid Offices ==
Students can visit the Financial Aid Office (FAO) at the college or university they plan to attend for more information about OSAP, the Ontario Student Access Guarantee and other financial aid questions. Students can find a list of FAOs at Ontario's public colleges and universities online.

=== Exceptional circumstances ===
The OSAP assessment may not reflect exceptional circumstances some students may have. As a result, a number of reviews have been developed to allow students to provide additional information regarding their specific circumstances. To learn more about the review process or to initiate a review, students can contact their school's financial aid office.

OSAP review forms: Students will often have to complete OSAP review forms to explain these exceptional circumstances. Some forms will need additional verification from a parent/guardian or physician.

== Repayment ==
For the first 6 months after graduation, finishing studies, or no longer being a full-time college or university student:

- no loan payments are needed
- interest is charged on the Ontario portion of the student loan
- interest will not accrue on the Canada portion of the student loan

This is a 6-month grace period.

Recipients of OSAP can expect to start repaying their loan at the end of the 7th month after they leave school.

=== Grace period extensions ===
If a student has recently completed their studies, they can apply to have their grace period extended for an additional six months through one of these two programs:

One-Year OSAP Grace Period for Entrepreneurs: for the owner or joint owner of an eligible new business located in Ontario.

One-Year OSAP Grace Period for Not-for Profit Employees: for borrowers working at an eligible not-for-profit organization in Ontario.

=== Loan repayment process ===
Within 6 months of leaving school, OSAP recipients will get a package in the mail from the National Student Loans Service Centre (NSLSC) that tells them:

- how much they owe
- their expected monthly payment
- the total number of payments they will need to make
- the date of their first payment
- the interest rate

Monthly loan payments are made to the National Student Loans Service Centre.

== See also ==
- List of colleges in Ontario
- List of universities in Ontario
- Student loans in Canada
