= St. Lawrence College, Ontario =

College in eastern Ontario, Canada

St. Lawrence College
- Type: Public
- Established: 1967
- Affiliations: CCAA, ACCC, AUCC, CBIE
- Chair: Julie Caffin
- President: Glenn Vollebregt
- Dean: Jennifer Haley
- Administrative staff: 829
- Students: 2025: 4,036 FTEs
- Location: Kingston, Ontario, Canada; 44.223°N 76.527°W
- Campus: Kingston, Cornwall, Brockville, Canadian Campus (Vancouver), Alpha Campus (Toronto)
- Colours: Red and Black
- Nickname: Surge
- Website: stlawrencecollege.ca

St. Lawrence College (SLC) is a College of Applied Arts and Technology with three campuses in Eastern Ontario, namely Brockville (1970), Cornwall (1968) and Kingston (founded September 1969). It is affiliated with private Alpha College of Business & Technology in Toronto and Canadian College in Vancouver. As of May, 2024, St. Lawrence College is no longer accepting new admissions to programs offered at their partner colleges. The population of St. Lawrence College and its affiliates includes a large contingent of international students. The college processed 5,421 international study permits in 2023. In April 2026, St. Lawrence College and Fleming College announced they would merge operations.

== History ==
Prior to the 1960s, only institutes of technology and vocational centres co-existed with universities in the province of Ontario at the post-secondary level, and many of those schools were established primarily to help veterans reintegrate into society in the post-war years. In response to an increasing need for technical education, Minister of Education (later Premier) William Davis, regarded now as the “father of the Ontario College System”, established Ontario's colleges of applied arts and technology to train individuals for employment in their respective communities. St. Lawrence College was founded during this period in 1967 as part of the province's initiative to create many such institutions. These schools were designed to provide career-oriented diploma and certificate courses, as well as continuing education programs in the communities in which they are located.

Brockville was originally proposed as the site for the main campus of St. Lawrence College, but Kingston was ultimately selected, since its larger population base would allow it to support a full campus. For the site, a 59-acre (24 ha) piece of farmland was purchased from the Ontario Psychiatric Hospital (now operated by Providence Continuing Care Centre) located at King St. W. and Portsmouth Ave. Brockville would retain a smaller campus, while the Cornwall and Kingston campuses were designed to serve six counties in Eastern Ontario (namely Frontenac, Leeds, Grenville, Dundas, Stormont and Glengarry).

Some of the earliest programs offered included Business Administration, Home Economics, Early Childhood Education, Engineering Technology, and Electronics Technician. Today, about 89 programs are offered.

In 2022, hundreds of students at the campus of St Lawrence's partner institution Alpha College of Business and Technology protested over-enrolment and cancelled courses. In 2024, Minister of Immigration, Refugees, and Citizenship Canada (IRCC) Marc Miller announced cuts in the numbers of student visas that would be granted, and new efforts to prevent fraud. While the Canadian Federation of students was happy with the decision, the college president criticized the move, stating publicly it was "disappointing" and "would "affect our reputation".

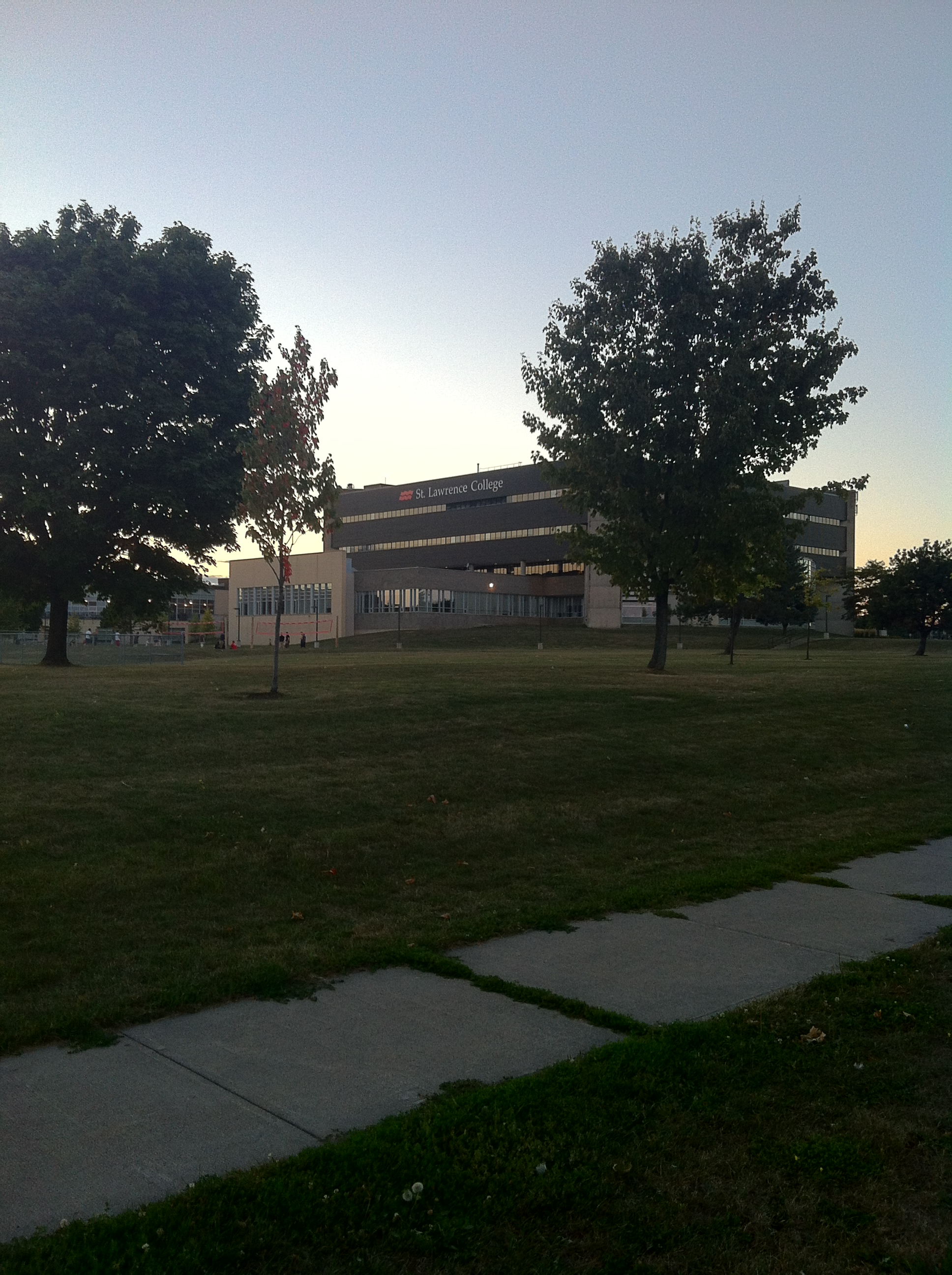
St. Lawrence College, Kingston Campus

== Academics ==
St. Lawrence College has received accreditation to offer Baccalaureate Degree programs in the following areas:

- Bachelor of Science in Nursing (BScN)
- Honours Bachelor of Behavioural Psychology

== Schools and faculty ==
- Allied Health
- Applied Science and Computing
- Arts, Media, and Design
- Business
- Community Services
- Interdisciplinary Studies and Pathways
- Nursing
- Skilled Trades and Apprenticeships

== Scholarships and bursaries ==
The Government of Canada sponsors an Aboriginal Bursaries Search Tool that lists over 680 scholarships, bursaries, and other incentives offered by governments, universities, and industry to support Aboriginal post-secondary participation. St. Lawrence College scholarships for Aboriginal, First Nations and Métis students include: Brown's First Nations Opportunities Bursary; Aboriginal Postsecondary Education and Training Bursary.

== See also ==
- Higher education in Canada
- List of colleges in Ontario
