= Georgian College Auto Show =

The Georgian College Auto Show is the largest outdoor auto show in North America and is organized by students of the Automotive School of Canada, a school of Georgian College and is held at the Barrie campus.

The event is all-ages, with activities for children and families. The auto show started in 1985 at the Barrie-based college.
