= David Trick (university administrator) =

David Trick (born 1955) is a former Ontario civil servant and university administrator.

Trick's career in the Ontario Public Service included Assistant Deputy Minister-level positions in postsecondary education and finance. He also worked in the fields of intergovernmental affairs, economic development, labour market policy and demographic analysis. After leaving government, he served as the first chief executive officer and vice provost of the University of Guelph-Humber, a partnership between the University of Guelph and Humber College to establish a new university campus in Toronto.

Trick holds an Honours Bachelor of Arts from York University, a Master of Arts from Brandeis University, a Master of Public Administration from the John F. Kennedy School of Government at Harvard University, and a Doctor of Philosophy in Political Science from the University of Toronto.

Trick is president of David Trick and Associates, a consulting firm specializing in higher education strategy and management. He has been a part-time instructor in Toronto Metropolitan University's Politics and Public Administration program. In 2019-20 he served as Interim President and CEO of the Higher Education Quality Council of Ontario.

Trick is co-author of Academic Reform: Policy Options for Improving the Quality and Cost-Effectiveness of Undergraduate Education in Ontario (with Ian D. Clark and Richard Van Loon, 2011) and Academic Transformation: The Forces Reshaping Higher Education in Ontario (with Ian D. Clark, Greg Moran and Michael Skolnik, 2009), both published by McGill-Queen's University Press. He has been awarded the J.E. Hodgetts Award of the Institute of Public Administration of Canada.

Trick is a co-founder, with Julie Jai, of the Yukon Prize for Visual Arts.

Trick was born in Medicine Hat, Alberta, and attended schools in Cuyahoga Falls, Ohio, and Winnipeg, Manitoba. He is an Eagle Scout.
