= Council of Ontario Universities =

Canadian provincial educational membership organization

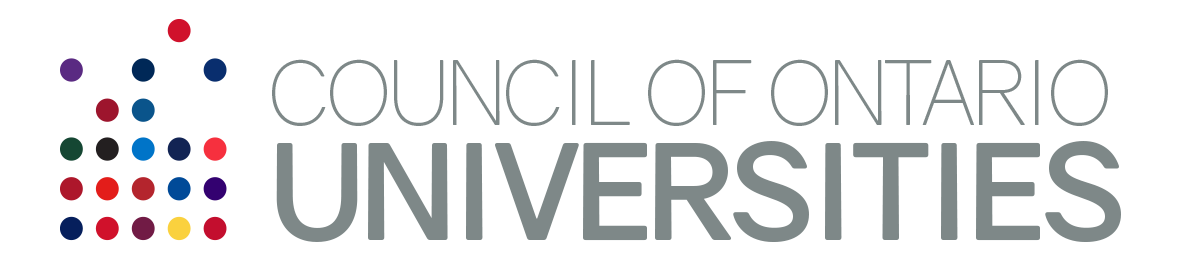
- Established: 1962; 64 years ago
- Affiliations: Universities Canada; IAU
- President: Steve Orsini
- Location: 180 Dundas Street West Suite 1800, Toronto, Ontario, Canada
- Website: cou.ca

The Council of Ontario Universities (COU) provides a forum for Ontario's universities to collaborate and advocate in support of their shared mission to the benefit and prosperity of students, communities and the province of Ontario. A membership organization consisting of Ontario's 20 publicly assisted universities and one associate member, the Royal Military College of Canada, COU works with members to find consensus on a wide range of university issues and advances them with government and other stakeholders.

The Ontario Universities' Application Centre (OUAC), a division of COU, is the processing centre for all of the province's universities. It collects and distributes applications for undergraduate, professional and selected graduate programs. The centre's website provides data on applications each year.

== Member Institutions ==
- Algoma University
- Brock University
- Carleton University
- University of Guelph
- Lakehead University
- Laurentian University
- McMaster University
- Nipissing University
- OCAD University
- Ontario Tech University
- University of Ottawa
- Queen's University
- Toronto Metropolitan University
- Trent University
- University of Toronto
- University of Waterloo
- Western University
- Wilfrid Laurier University
- University of Windsor
- York University

=== Associate Member Institution ===
- Royal Military College of Canada

=== Provisional Member Institutions ===
- Northern Ontario School of Medicine University
- Université de Hearst
- Université de l'Ontario français
