= Rae Report =

Canadian educational report

The Rae Report was the result of a provincial review of post-secondary education led by former Ontario Premier Bob Rae. After the Liberal government of Dalton McGuinty brought in a fully funded tuition fee freeze at public colleges and universities in April 2004, it announced a sweeping review of public post-secondary education was to take place.

== Review process ==
In the summer of 2004, the government announced that Rae was to head the review. As a backup to the former premier, a seven member advisory panel was announced: Leslie Church, Ian Davidson, Bill Davis, Don Drummond (economist), Inez Elliston, Richard Johnston and Huguette LaBelle. Bill Davis was a Progressive Conservative and former Education Minister and Premier of Ontario. Don Drummond is currently a Senior Vice President and Chief Economist of the Toronto-Dominion Bank. Richard Johnston was formerly a leadership rival to Rae at the 1982 Ontario NDP convention. The panel also included a young Liberal and a former adviser to the federal government.

Rae toured the province in fall of 2004, hosting many town-halls and roundtables.

== Conclusions ==
The final report called for deregulation of tuition fees and the introduction of a scheme to finance university and college education - income-contingent loan repayments. The report also called for an increase in public funding of colleges and universities - about half of what had been cut in the past decade, as well as upfront grants for students who come from households with an income of less than $22,000 per annum.

== Criticism ==
Rae's appointment was opposed by many students, who had seen his government permit a 57% increase in tuition fees and the elimination of need-based grants. (The Rae administration cut back on social services as a whole in the early nineties to reduce the deficit caused by the recession.) The composition of the advisory panel also came under fire as none of its members had a record of support for reduced or frozen tuition fees.

Rae was also criticized for having drawn conclusions prior to the consultation phase of the review. In May 2004, Rae speculated about the possibility of an outright deregulation of tuition fees - to the outrage of student advocacy groups.

Upon its release the report was criticized by Howard Hampton, Rae's former cabinet minister and successor as Ontario NDP leader. This is not surprising, as both had a tenuous relationship during the 1990-95 NDP government; the left-wing Hampton had disapproved of many of Rae's centrist policies. The report was also criticized by the Canadian Federation of Students who had always lobbied for a tuition freeze/lowering.

Rae defended his report, arguing that low income non-university individuals would not benefit from a tuition freeze/lowering. He stated that a reduced tuition would make little impact on a student's decision between university and entering the workforce. Rae also said that non-university individuals would be forced to bear the tax burden needed to sustain a freeze/lowering. Supporters also asserted that a university education would primarily benefit the individual rather than being a public good.
