= William Edwin Beckel =

Canadian academic administrator (1926–2018)

President of Carleton University
- In office 1979–1989
- Preceded by: James Downey (pro tempore)
- Succeeded by: Robin Hugh Farquhar

President of the University of Lethbridge
- In office 1972–1979
- Preceded by: Sam Smith
- Succeeded by: John H. Woods

Personal details
- Born: April 11, 1926 Kingston, Ontario, Canada
- Died: October 15, 2018 (aged 92) West Vancouver, British Columbia, Canada
- Education: Queen's University, Iowa State University, Cornell University

William Edwin Beckel (April 11, 1926 – October 15, 2018) was a Canadian academic and former president of Carleton University in Ottawa and the University of Lethbridge in Alberta. He was an early proponent of the use of television as a university teaching medium. He was born in Kingston, Ontario.

== Career ==
=== 1960s and 1970s ===
Beckel, a zoologist, was an early proponent of the use of television as a teaching medium. In 1964 he became the first dean of Scarborough College at the University of Toronto, where he and Principal Carlton Williams led an experiment in teaching half the courses using TV-only lectures.

Beckel was president of the University of Lethbridge from 1971 to 1979. During Beckel's tenure, the university implemented Management Arts, Native American studies and expanded cooperative education. Under Dean Russell Leskiw, the education program became one of the best in Canada. A highlight during Beckel's presidency was the provincial government's approval of the Centre for the Arts, a building that allowed for the creation of U of L's art collection.

Like many Ontario universities at the time, Carleton was in financial trouble when Beckel took the helm in 1979. That year it was running a $1.5-million deficit.

=== 1980s–1990s ===
Beckel oversaw several controversial faculty buyouts, and in 1980, the school had to dip into academic scholarship funds to help cover its debts. Beckel's efforts during the 1980s eventually pulled Carleton out of the red and into a building period that resulted in a new student residence, a new library, a Life Sciences Research Building, an Art Gallery, a Social Sciences Research Building, a Day Care Centre and the beginning of a new engineering complex.

Unlike Carleton's rival universities, most of whom were raising admissions standards to compete for better students, Beckel decided to keep Carleton open to high-school graduates with averages as low as 60 per cent on the premise that "every student should have the right to fail."

The benefit of this philosophy was that first year enrollment increased bringing with it increased tuition revenue that more than offset the impact of a lower retention rate. This egalitarian philosophy combined with tough financial controls resulted in a strong financial position for the university and made it "rare chance" university. For many students, Carleton offered a rare chance at a university education. (Beckel's critics were the first to coin Carleton's pejorative nickname "Last Chance U.")

On July 1, 1989, the same year he received an honorary degree of Legum Doctoris from Carleton, Beckel was succeeded as president by Robin Hugh Farquhar.

Academic offices
| Preceded by Sam Smith | President of University of Lethbridge; 1972–1979 | Succeeded by John H. Woods |
