= List of colleges in Ontario =

Colleges in Ontario may refer to several types of educational institutions. College in Canada most commonly refers to a career-oriented post-secondary institution that provides vocational training or education in applied arts, applied technology and applied science. Post-secondary colleges in Ontario typically offer certificate and diploma programs.

There are 24 publicly funded colleges in Ontario. Most are designated as a College of Applied Arts and Technology (CAAT), although five are designated as a Institute of Technology and Advanced Learning (ITAL). (Note: Five colleges were designated as an Institute of Technology and Advanced Learning, although only three use the title in their formal name. George Brown College and Seneca Polytechnic are two colleges that were designated as ITALs but do not use the designation in their formal name.) In addition to certificates, apprenticeship, and diplomas, several public colleges have also received ministerial consent from the province's Ministry of Colleges and Universities to award degrees. While any public college in Ontario may receive ministerial consent to offer degrees, degree programs at CAATs may only constitute 5 per cent of the institution's programming, while ITALs are capped at up to 15 per cent.

In addition to publicly funded colleges, the province has also authorized the establishment of over 500 privately operated career colleges that provide certificate and diploma programs.

The Canadian Armed Forces also operate several institutions in Ontario that also bear the name "college". However, one of these institutions is considered a university with full degree-granting authority, while the others are considered staff colleges that provide professional development courses for officers of the Canadian Armed Forces.

== Public colleges ==
The modern college system in Ontario which focuses on vocational training was established through Bill Davis' Bill-153 on May 21, 1965. This legislation aimed to establish a distinct post-secondary educational system separate from universities. All 24 publicly funded colleges in Ontario were established through the Ontario Colleges of Applied Arts and Technology Act, 1965, which outlined that these institutions were to provide "career-oriented, post-secondary education and training to assist individuals in finding and keeping employment, to meet the needs of employers and the changing work environment and to support the economic and social development of their local and diverse communities." These CAATs represented a consolidation of the province's earlier vocational and career-oriented postsecondary institutions formed in the 1940s to 1965, including institutes of technology, institutes of trades, and vocational centres.

Public colleges in Ontario historically only provided certificate, apprenticeship, and diploma programs, and did not offer degree programs, as the province had one of the most stringent regulations in North America in restricting degree-granting authority solely to universities. In 2000, the Ministry of Training, Colleges and Universities authorized colleges to offer a limited number of applied baccalaureate degrees under the Postsecondary Education Choice and Excellence Act, 2000. However, in contrast to public universities, which possess full degree-granting authority through legislation, public colleges in Ontario can only offer specific degrees after receiving ministerial consent from the provincial government.

In 2003, the province introduced a new designation, Institute of Technology and Advanced Learning, to denote publicly funded colleges where up to 15 per cent of its programs awarded degrees, while colleges that retained the College of Applied Arts and Technology title were limited at 5 per cent. In 2012–2013 approximately 74 degree programs were offered by 12 Ontario colleges.

The Ontario Public Service Employees Union represents faculty and support staff working in Ontario's publicly funded colleges, though certain classes of faculty and support staff are not covered. These are divided into three bargaining units: academic, full-time support, and part-time support.

=== List of public colleges ===
There are 24 publicly funded colleges in Ontario. Most operate as a "College of Applied Arts and Technology", although five are designated as an "Institute of Technology and Advanced Learning".

English is the language of instruction for the majority of programs at publicly funded colleges in Ontario, although some programs are taught in French. There are 22 publicly funded colleges operating as English-language institutions and two as French-language institutions.

The following is a list of publicly funded colleges in Ontario:

Name	Main campus	Established	Language	Type
Algonquin College	Ottawa	1967	English	College of Applied Arts and Technology
Collège Boréal	Sudbury	1995	French	College of Applied Arts and Technology
Cambrian College	Sudbury	1967	English	College of Applied Arts and Technology
Canadore College	North Bay	1972	English	College of Applied Arts and Technology
Centennial College	Toronto	1966	English	College of Applied Arts and Technology
Conestoga College	Kitchener	1967	English	Institute of Technology and Advanced Learning
Confederation College	Thunder Bay	1967	English	College of Applied Arts and Technology
Durham College	Oshawa	1967	English	College of Applied Arts and Technology
Fanshawe College	London	1967	English	College of Applied Arts and Technology
Fleming College	Peterborough	1967	English	College of Applied Arts and Technology
George Brown Polytechnic	Toronto	1967	English	Institute of Technology and Advanced Learning
Georgian College	Barrie	1967	English	College of Applied Arts and Technology
Humber Polytechnic	Toronto	1967	English	Institute of Technology and Advanced Learning
Collège La Cité	Ottawa	1990	French	College of Applied Arts and Technology
Lambton College	Sarnia	1969	English	College of Applied Arts and Technology
Loyalist College	Belleville	1967	English	College of Applied Arts and Technology
Mohawk College	Hamilton	1966	English	College of Applied Arts and Technology
Niagara College	Welland	1967	English	College of Applied Arts and Technology
Northern College	Timmins	1967	English	College of Applied Arts and Technology
St. Clair College	Windsor	1966	English	College of Applied Arts and Technology
St. Lawrence College	Kingston	1967	English	College of Applied Arts and Technology
Sault College	Sault Ste. Marie	1973 (Note: The institution originated as an Ontario Vocational Centre (predecessor to the province's Colleges of Applied Arts & Technology) opened in Sault Ste. Marie in 1965. In 1967, the Sault Ste. Marie Ontario Vocational Centre was reorganized into a satellite campus for Cambrian College. The institution became independent of Cambrian College in 1973, becoming Sault College.)	English	College of Applied Arts and Technology
Seneca Polytechnic	Toronto	1967	English	Institute of Technology and Advanced Learning
Sheridan College	Oakville	1967	English	Institute of Technology and Advanced Learning

== Private colleges ==
Ontario has over 500 career colleges (formerly known as private career colleges) that confer certificate and diplomas. These colleges are regulated by the Ontario Career Colleges Act, 2005. These are privately operated institutions which must be registered and approved by the provincial Superintendent of Career Colleges.

== Military institutions ==
The names of several military institutions based in Ontario include the word college, and are all operated by the Canadian Armed Forces.

The Royal Military College of Canada is a military university based in Kingston, and offers undergraduate and graduate education for officers-in-training. Although the institution includes the word college in its name, the Royal Military College of Canada is recognized as a university with full degree-granting authority.

The Canadian Armed Forces also operates several staff colleges in Ontario, including the Canadian Forces College in Toronto and the Canadian Army Command and Staff College in Kingston. These institutions provides professional development programs for military officers in the Canadian Armed Forces.

== See also ==
- Higher education in Canada
- Higher education in Ontario
- List of business schools in Canada
- List of colleges in Canada
- List of law schools in Canada
- List of Ontario students' associations
- List of universities in Canada
- Ontario Student Assistance Program
- Ontario College Application Service
- University colleges in Ontario
