= List of universities and colleges in New Brunswick =

This is a list of universities and colleges in New Brunswick, Canada:

== Public chartered universities ==
Higher education in Canada by province or territory
- Mount Allison University (Sackville)
- St. Thomas University (Fredericton)
- Université de Moncton (multiple campuses)
- University of New Brunswick (Fredericton and St. John)

== Private chartered universities ==
- Crandall University (Moncton)
- Kingswood University (Sussex)
- St. Stephen's University (St. Stephen)

== Private universities recognized under the Degree Granting Act ==
- University of Fredericton (Fredericton)
- Yorkville University (Fredericton)

== Colleges ==
- Atlantic Business College (Fredericton)
- Canadian School of Natural Nutrition (Moncton)
- City Institute of Higher Learning
- Collège communautaire du Nouveau-Brunswick (multiple campuses)
- Eastern College (multiple campuses)
- Maritime College of Forest Technology (Fredericton and Bathurst)
- McKenzie College (Moncton)
- Moncton Flight College (Dieppe)
- New Brunswick College of Craft and Design (Fredericton)
- New Brunswick Community College (multiple campuses)
- New Brunswick Indigenous Career College (Richibucto Road)
- OLS Academy (Moncton)
- Oulton College (Moncton)

== See also ==
- Higher education in Canada
- Higher education in New Brunswick
- List of business schools in Canada
- List of Canadian universities by endowment
- List of colleges in Canada
- List of law schools in Canada
- List of universities in Canada
