= Higher education in New Brunswick =

Education system in New Brunswick, Canada

New Brunswick

Higher education in New Brunswick (also referred to as post-secondary education) refers to education provided by higher education institutions in the Canadian province of New Brunswick. Higher education has a rich history in New Brunswick. The first English-language university in Canada was the University of New Brunswick. Mount Allison University was the first in the British Empire to award a baccalaureate to a woman, Grace Annie Lockhart, B.Sc. in 1875. Education is the responsibility of the provinces in Canada and there is no federal ministry governing it.

New Brunswick's Department of Post-Secondary Education, Training and Labour, is led on the Post-Secondary side by the Honourable Trevor Holder. The Department provides a major portion of post-secondary revenue, but universities and colleges alike remain relatively independent in their governance structures. New Brunswick has four public chartered universities, and three private chartered universities which have their own acts. There are a further three private for-profit universities recognized under the Degree Granting Act. There are two autonomous English and French community college corporations established under the New Brunswick Community Colleges Act and two other specialized colleges.

== History ==
Readers may find useful the history on the Provincial Archives of New Brunswick website. Chapters on "Education: the early years", "Teachers training", "Post-secondary education", and a Bibliography all give useful background information.

=== American Revolution to Canadian Confederation ===
==== University of New Brunswick ====
Loyalists who settled in Nova Scotia who had been involved with American higher education, most notably Charles Inglis of King's College, New York; Benjamin Moore; and Jonathan Odell, drew up a plan for the future education of their sons in Nova Scotia. One result was the creation of King's College in 1789 in Windsor, Nova Scotia. The University of New Brunswick was established in 1785 as a non-denominational institute, the Academy of Liberal Arts and Sciences. It transformed into the Anglican-affiliated College of New Brunswick in 1800, and then King's College in 1828, which is when it granted its first degrees. Finally, it became the non-denominational University of New Brunswick in 1859.

==== Mount Allison University ====
In June 1839, Charles Allison proposed to the Wesleyan Methodists that a school of elementary and higher learning be built. His offer to purchase a site in Sackville, to erect a suitable building for an academy, and to contribute operating funds of £100 a year for 10 years was accepted and the Wesleyan Academy for boys, which was later elevated to the status of a university, was opened in 1843. In 1854, a girls' institution (later known as the "Ladies College") was opened as a branch institution to complement the boys' academy. By 1858, both had attained degree-granting status and were referred to as Mount Allison College. Mount Allison Wesleyan College was established in 1862 with degree-granting powers on behalf of the other Academies and the first two students, Howard Sprague and Josiah Wood, graduated in May 1863. Mount Allison was the first university in the British Empire to confer a bachelor's degree to a woman in 1875, (Grace Annie Lockhart, B.Sc.) and the first university in Canada to grant a Bachelor of Arts degree to a woman in 1882, (Harriet Starr Stewart, B.A.). For nearly a century, Mount Allison functioned as three distinct, mutually enriching parts: the College proper, which became the University of Mount Allison College in 1886., the Boys' Academy and the Ladies College, the later two closing in 1953 and 1946 respectively.

==== Collège Saint-Joseph ====
The Collège Saint-Joseph was founded on 10 October 1864 in Memramcook by Father Camille Lefebvre of the order of Sainte-Croix. Its first home was the former Saint-Thomas Seminary, which had closed 2 years earlier. The Collège was the first Francophone degree-granting post-secondary institution in Atlantic Canada. The Collège received its university charter from the province on 23 March 1868 and full university status in 1888. It was renamed in 1898 the University of St Joseph's College. In 1906 it was admitted by Oxford University to the statute of Colonial University, and in 1928 became St Joseph's University. Education was offered bilingually as it admitted not only Acadians but also Irish Catholics. The Collège Saint-Joseph, along with two others, was later subsumed into the Université de Moncton, as described below.

==== Confederation ====
At the Charlottetown Conference in 1864, representatives from the British North America colonies - Nova Scotia, New Brunswick, Prince Edward Island and the Province of Canada - gathered to discuss Confederation. In 1867, the British North America Act, 1867 was passed by the British government and then given the Queen's assent. It established Confederation and outlined division of responsibility between the provincial and federal governments in several areas, setting education as the responsibility of the provinces.

=== Into the twentieth century ===
==== St. Thomas University ====
An institution called St. Thomas College was established in 1910 by catholic Bishop of Chatham, Thomas F. Barry, in Chatham, New Brunswick, to provide education for secondary and junior college level male students. Until 1934, St. Thomas College remained a High School and Junior College, but in that year, it became a degree-granting institution upon receipt of its University Charter from the provincial legislature of New Brunswick. St. Thomas College changed to St. Thomas University in 1960 and in 1961, the high school courses were removed from the curriculum. In 1962, St. Thomas entered into a federation with the University of New Brunswick and by 1964, relocated its campus to Fredericton. To avoid duplicate services, the two universities share each other's libraries and St. Thomas students have access to UNB's scientific, cultural, and athletic facilities.

==== University of Moncton/Université de Moncton ====
Université de Moncton, a francophone university with campuses in Moncton, Edmundston and Shippagan, was formed in 1963 as an initial amalgamation of three colleges: the Collège Saint-Joseph, the Collège du Sacré-Coeur de Bathurst, and the Collège Saint-Louis d'Edmundston after the recommendations of a Royal Commission On Higher Education, which was headed by John Deutsch, Adrien Cormier and Robert Maxwell, then the superintendent of schools in Carlton County. The commission reported favorably to the creation of a French-language institution on 21 June 1962.

Excluding Quebec, the Université de Moncton is the largest francophone university in Canada.

==== The Community Colleges (NBCC and CCNB) ====
In 1973, the New Brunswick Community College (NBCC) was established with a mandate to provide post-secondary non-university education throughout the Province. The opportunity to train students on emerging occupations near their homes was also recognized. In 1980, its corporate structure would be replaced by a governmental one with the creation of the Department of Continuing Education, later renamed the Department of Community Colleges, with nine locations throughout New Brunswick and serving both the anglophone and francophone communities. The 1993 Commission on Excellence in Education recommended NBCC be established as a crown-owned corporation, and in 1996, it was restructured as a Special Operating Agency (SOA) so as to operate in a more business-like manner and gain more financial and administrative independence. The 2010 New Brunswick Community Colleges Act served to create two autonomously governed colleges, one Anglophone with six campuses and one Francophone with five campuses.

==== New Brunswick College of Craft and Design (NBCCD) ====
The New Brunswick College of Craft and Design (NBCCD) was founded in 1938 by the government to train rural hand-weavers. In the 1950s after World War II it reopened a summer program; in the 1960s it was called The Crafts School; and in 2007 it was transformed into a comprehensive college offering diplomas and the Bachelor of Applied Arts degree.

==== Maritime College of Forest Technology ====
The Maritime College of Forest Technology, renamed from The Maritime Forest Ranger School in 2003, began in 1946, as a co-operative effort of the provincial governments of New Brunswick and Nova Scotia, and the wood-using industries of the two provinces. The francophone program in Bathurst was started in 1982. Present facilities at the Fredericton Campus were completed in 1986. The objective of the College is to produce competent forest technologists for service with private, industrial or public (government) forestry or natural resource organizations. The program is officially recognized by the Society of American Foresters, and the Association of Registered Professional Foresters of New Brunswick.

==== Developments in Governance ====
In 1974, the New Brunswick Council on Higher Education was established as a buffer between the government and post-secondary institutions. It makes recommendations regarding funding. In 1991, the Department of Advanced Education and Training, which had been created in 1985, was merged with the department of Labour to become the Department of Advanced Education and Labour. This would again split in 1998 into the Department of Labour and the Department of Education, the latter absorbing the responsibilities of the Department of Advanced Education.

=== Twenty-first century developments ===
==== Private Chartered Universities ====
There are three private chartered universities in New Brunswick, all with religious affiliation. These are Crandall University, affiliated with the Atlantic Baptist Church, in Moncton, the evangelical Christian Kingswood University in Sussex and the Christian trans-denominational St. Stephen's University in St. Stephen.

==== Private For-Profit Universities ====
New Brunswick adopted the Degree Granting Act in 2001, which allowed private for-profit institutions to confer university degrees. The Act provides for evaluation of the quality of programs that lead to a degree offered by all public and private institutions in New Brunswick. There are currently two institutions that have been designated to offer specific degrees through that legislation. They include Yorkville University, which was established in 2003 and offers a combination of on-line and on-site degrees; and the University of Fredericton, which now provides certificate and graduate degree programs in business leadership.

==== Further Developments in Governance ====
Maritime Provinces Higher Education Commission Act was passed in 2005. Ratified by the Council of Maritime Premiers, the act defined the mandate of the Commission as both improving and providing the best possible service to students as lifelong learners in the provinces of New Brunswick, Nova Scotia and Prince Edward Island.

The Department of Post-Secondary Education, Training and Labour (PETL), which had undergone numerous name changes and departmental mergers over the past years, launched the Commission on Post-Secondary Education in 2007 to make recommendations that would help to make the post-secondary education and training system more accessible, collaborative, competitive, and relevant.

== Structure ==
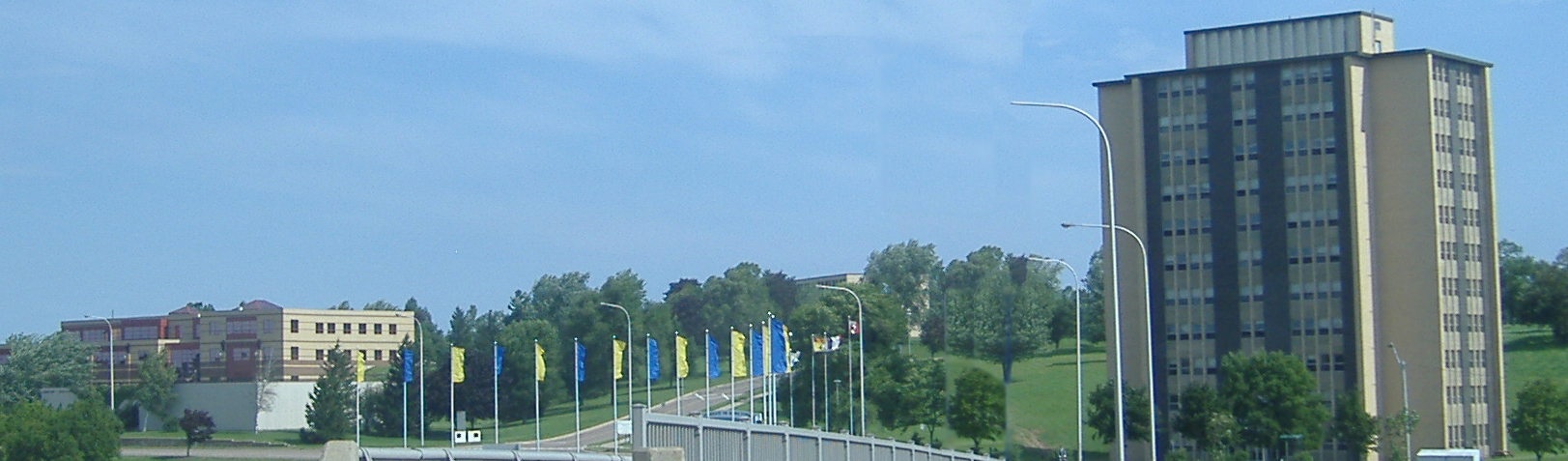
Université de Moncton

=== Governance ===
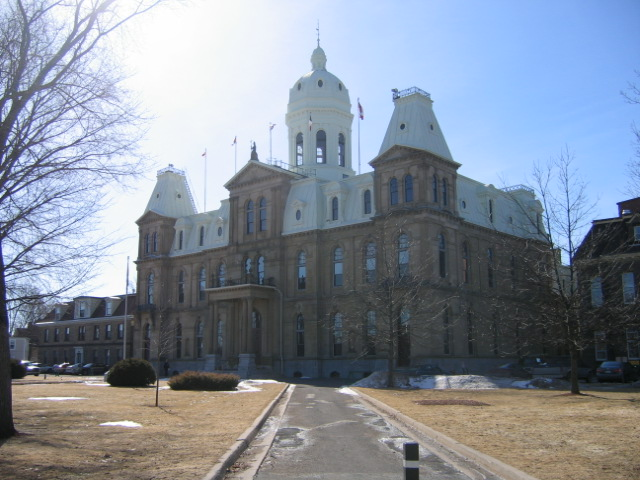
NB Legislative Building, seat of New Brunswick Government since 1882

The higher education system in New Brunswick includes the governing Ministry of Postsecondary Education Training and Labour, related agencies, boards, and commissions, as well as public charted universities, private charted universities, universities recognized under the degree-granting act, public colleges, and other institutions such as private career colleges. The Post-Secondary Education Division of the Department of Post-Secondary Education, Training and Labour oversees the post-secondary branches including, the Post-Secondary Transformation Unit, the College Support Service Branch, the New Brunswick College of Craft and Design, the University Relations Branch, the Private Occupational Training Branch, and the Student Financial Services Branch.

Universities are independently administered institutions with full autonomy over admissions and all other academic matters. New Brunswick provides funding to four public universities. Private universities do not receive government funding. In addition, the governing bodies of the eleven New Brunswick Community Colleges include provincial government representatives.

=== Acts ===
==== Degree Granting Act ====
In 2001, New Brunswick adopted the Degree Granting Act, allowing private for-profit institutions to confer university degrees.

==== Private Occupational Training Act ====
Besides various government-support from pre-employment, apprenticeship and other vocational programmes, there are also about 65 private training organizations operating in New Brunswick which are required to register under the Private Occupational Training Act. Private sector programs that are considered enhance employment in some form must register programs/courses and instructors in accordance with the Act and its Regulation. Examples of training at post-secondary levels include Dental Assisting, Massage therapy, Truck Driving, Cosmetology, Travel & Tourism, Business Education and Computer related programs.

==== New Brunswick Community Colleges Act ====
The New Brunswick Community Colleges Act established two community colleges, one anglophone, the New Brunswick Community College (NBCC), and one francophone, Collège communautaire du Nouveau-Brunswick (CCNB), each with its own Board of Governors. Each college also manages its funds separately, but both report to the Minister of Post-Secondary Education, Training and Labour.

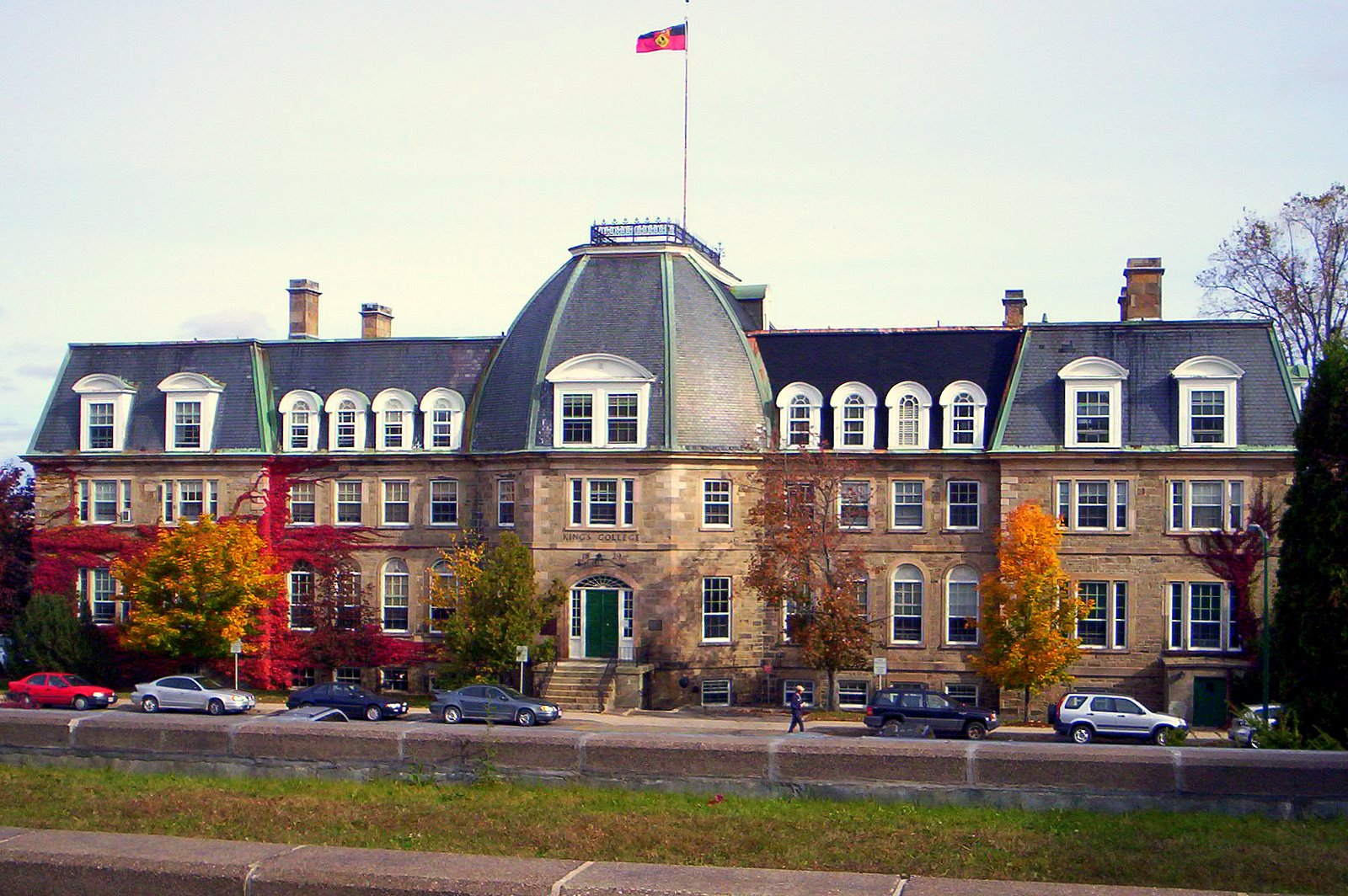
Sir Howard Douglas Hall on the UNB Fredericton campus. Currently the oldest university building still in use in Canada.

=== Associations ===
==== Association of Atlantic Universities (AAU) ====
Established in 1964, the Association of Atlantic Universities is a voluntary association of the 17 universities in the Atlantic region and in the West Indies which offer programmes leading to a degree or have degree-granting status. One of the fundamental roles of the association is to create greater awareness and understanding of the important contribution of universities to the social and economic development of the Atlantic Provinces. The Association's business is conducted by the AAU Council, which consists of the executive heads of all the member institutions. The AAU currently meets two times a year and is served by a permanent secretariat. The activities of the Association are funded principally through annual membership fees based on the operating income of the member institutions.

==== Association of Canadian Community Colleges of Canada (ACCC) ====
The Association of Canadian Community Colleges (ACCC) was established in 1972. The association interacts with Canadian and international governments, businesses and industries providing representation on behalf of the colleges and institutes of Canadian college members.

==== Association of Universities and Colleges of Canada (AUCC) ====
The Association of Universities and Colleges of Canada has represented, since 1911, the non-profit universities and colleges that offer degrees in Canada. The presidents of the universities and colleges of Canada represent their institutions in this association, sharing information and promoting the interests of Canadian higher education.

==== Association des collèges et universités de la francophonie canadienne (ACUFC) ====
Established on 31 March 2015, the ACUFC (en: Association of Colleges and Universities of the Canadian Francophonie) represents French and bilingual post-secondary colleges and universities outside Quebec. The new association replaces the Association of Universities of the Canadian Francophonie. 20 post-secondary institutions across Canada are members, including Université de Moncton and Collège communautaire du Nouveau-Brunswick. The Université of Moncton medical school, Centre de Formation Médicale du Nouveau-Brunswick, which is a joint project with the Université de Sherbrooke, is a separate member of the ACUFC.

==== Council of Atlantic Ministers of Education and Training (CAMET) ====
The Atlantic ministers responsible for education and training signed an agreement in April 2004 under which the provinces of New Brunswick, Newfoundland and Labrador, Nova Scotia, and Prince Edward Island agreed to collaborate on joint undertakings to respond to the needs identified in public and post-secondary education. CAMET is dedicated to further enhancing the level of cooperation in public and post-secondary education by working on common issues to improve learning for all Atlantic Canadians, optimize efficiencies and bring added value to provincial initiatives and priorities.

==== Maritime Provinces Higher Education Commission (MPHEC) ====
The MPHEC was created in 1974 to assist Prince Edward Island, New Brunswick and Nova Scotia and their institutions in attaining a more efficient and effective utilization and allocation of higher education resources. It provides quality assurance, data and information sharing, cooperative action, and regional programmes as well as specific services to one or more provinces or institutions as agreed to by the Ministers of Education.

== Funding ==
=== Post secondary education funding formula ===
Funding for Higher Education in New Brunswick is based upon two methods: Unrestricted Operating Assistance and Restricted Operating Assistance. Unrestricted Operating Assistance represents approximately 95 percent of total operating assistance to New Brunswick's four public universities, with Restricted Operating Assistance representing the balance. The Department of Education is responsible for determining the final allocation of funding. Unrestricted grants are allocated as a Flat Grant (75 percent is based on historical funding) and Enrolment Grant 25 percent - based on weighted FTE and three year rolling average. Restricted purpose grants are a small part of overall funding and generally are institution specific or allocated based on share of Operating Grant. Capital funding is project based.

=== Tuition ===
Tuition at New Brunswick post secondary institutions are set by the individual institutions, in consultation with government. The public university full-time domestic tuition fees for 2011-2012 are $6,920 at Mount Allison University, $4,770 at St. Thomas University, $5,117 at Université de Moncton, and $5,682 at the University of New Brunswick. The tuition fees increased by a range of 3–4.4% from the 2010–2011 academic year. The domestic tuition at New Brunswick Community College and Collège Communautair du Nouveau-Brunswick for 2011-12 is $3,000 per year plus fees.

== Access ==
=== Participation rates ===
As of 2007, participation in post-secondary education in the Maritimes was higher than the national average, with approximately a 28% participation rate in New Brunswick (NB), while Canada as a whole hovered around 20-26%; this could be partly attributed to the high enrolment of out-of-province students who chose to attend postsecondary studies in New Brunswick. The university participation rate in New Brunswick continued to increase between 2005/06 and 2006/07; but this change could mainly be attributed to the Francophone population of New Brunswick. While participation rates were higher than the national average, the population of 18- to 24-year-olds in NB and the rest of the Maritime provinces were predicted to decline greater than the rest of Canada; undergraduate participation peaked in New Brunswick in 2003/04 and in Prince Edward Island and Nova Scotia during the 2004/05 academic session. Between 1990 and 2000, the number of 18- to 24-year-olds dropped 13% in the Maritimes while the rest of Canada dropped less than 1%. Some of the factors leading to a decline in postsecondary participation in NB included: a strong economy that encouraged students to enter the labor force early; and an out-migration of students from the Maritime Provinces (NB, NS, PEI).

As of October 1, 2011, enrolment has increased in all but one of the four public universities compared to the same time in 2010. Mount Allison University, St. Thomas University, and the University of New Brunswick experienced an increase of enrolment by 1.9%, 1.7% and 1.8 respectively. The Université de Moncton experienced an enrolment decline of 1.6%.

=== Mobility patterns ===
Over the past number of years (1997–2007), approximately one in seven New Brunswickers have left their home province to go to university in another province. A 2002 report, by the Maritimes Province Higher Education Commission has shown that "after graduation, while male residents do tend to leave at greater rates than female residents from New Brunswick, the gap is not statistically significant one year after graduation." It has been shown that the majority of those leaving the province are leaving to find a job.

=== Mechanisms to facilitate transfer and articulation ===
In the past, New Brunswick had an on-line transfer system that focused on transfers between New Brunswick's two public postsecondary systems (community colleges and public universities). The New Brunswick Community College (NBCC) has had a "policy in place since 1994 to allow, where academically appropriate, credit transferability of courses, programs, or units of instruction that have been taken at approved public and private postsecondary institutions." "The two public postsecondary systems have also developed articulation agreements for applied degree programs. There are a number of agreements for block transfer of credits within different programs of these institutions." In order to support students through this process, each institution has appointed a representative to assist in their transfer of credits. In the articulated applied degree programs, coursework is completed in at least one college or university, there are one or more exit points at two or more institutions, and there are components consisting of academic program and occupational content with labour market linkages.

In 2011, the New Brunswick Council on Articulations and Transfer (NBCAT) implemented the Credit Transfer Portal, through which New Brunswickers and institutions can assess transfer credit and prior learning. The Credit Transfer Portal helps identify possible equivalencies or credit transfers for students when transferring between post-secondary institutions in New Brunswick.

=== Student Financial Support ===
==== Millennium Access Bursaries in New Brunswick ====
The Canada Millennium Scholarship Foundation was established in 1998 to provide support to students with demonstrated financial need. The millennium access bursaries have been distributed in the form of grants to single, dependent, low-income students. There are two groups of eligible students: those who began post-secondary studies during the 2005/06 academic year, and those who began studies in 2006/07. Millennium access bursaries are not available to students who have enrolled after the end of the 2006/07 academic year. Eligible students were able to receive a $1,000 grant in their first year of study, $2,200 in the second year, and $1,800 in the third. Students must have been enrolled full-time in undergraduate studies that lead to a degree, certificate or diploma in a program of at least two years in length. Those students who applied for financial assistance from New Brunswick Student Financial Services were considered automatically for the grant. Since the discontinuance of the Canada Millennium Scholarship Foundation (CMSF) Millennium Bursary, a federal transition grant was created for eligible students.

==== Canada Student Loan and New Brunswick Student Loan ====
The Canada Student Loan and New Brunswick Student Loan is an integrated student loan for which the federal government provides 60% (up to $210 per week of study) and the provincial government provides the other 40% (up to $140 per week of study) of the student's assessed need.

==== New Brunswick Tuition Rebate ====
The New Brunswick Tuition Rebate provides to graduates of eligible post-secondary institutions a non-taxable rebate of 50% of the cost of tuition. Graduates must pay New Brunswick personal income tax, and live and work in New Brunswick. The benefit is available up to a lifetime maximum of $20,000.

==== New Brunswick Timely Completion Benefit ====
The New Brunswick Timely Completion Benefit was designed to help students accumulate less student loan debt by encouraging them to complete their education within the minimum timeline established for their post-secondary program. Students who meet the criteria may have a portion of their student loans above a specific amount forgiven for the post-secondary credential that they were awarded.

==== Repayment Assistance Plan ====
The Repayment Assistance Plan was established to help reduce post-secondary student loan debt by basing monthly student loan payments on the total of all federal and provincial student loan amounts owed, wage earnings and family size.

=== Distance higher education ===
All universities and colleges in New Brunswick are currently offering distance education courses using various methods. One private degree-granting institution operates completely online and there is substantial focus on the development of Internet-based postsecondary education.

== See also ==
- List of universities in Canada
- List of colleges in Canada
- List of business schools in Canada
- List of law schools in Canada
- List of Canadian universities by endowment
- Higher education in Canada
- List of universities and colleges in New Brunswick
