= Association of Colleges and Universities of the Canadian Francophonie =

Coordinates: 45.430511°N 75.692711°W

- Association des collèges et universités de la francophonie canadienne
- Abbreviation: ACUFC
- Headquarters: Ottawa, Ontario, Canada
- Location: Canada
- Members: 22
- Official language: French
- Co-chairs: Sophie Bouffard; Jacques Frémont
- Chief executive officer: Lynn Brouillette
- Website: acufc.ca
- Formerly called: Association of Universities of the Canadian Francophonie

Association of Colleges and Universities of the Canadian Francophonie (known by the acronym ACUFC for its French name, "Association des collèges et universités de la francophonie canadienne") is an association of community colleges and universities in minority francophone communities in Canada, through cooperation between its member institutions. The association represents its member institutions on topics of mutual interest before the Government of Canada, national and international organizations.

== History ==
Up until 1 April 2015, the organisation was known as the Association of Universities of the Canadian Francophonie, or in French, Association des universités de la francophonie canadienne (AUFC), when it did not include community college members.

== Members ==
Locations of member institutions of the ACUFC

The association is made up of the following 22 institutions which promote community college and university education within minority francophone communities in Canada:

- The Office of Francophone and Francophile Affairs of Simon Fraser University in Burnaby, British Columbia
- Collège Éducacentre based in Vancouver, British Columbia
- Campus Saint-Jean of the University of Alberta in Edmonton, Alberta
- Collège nordique in Yellowknife, Northwest Territories
- La Cité universitaire francophone of the University of Regina in Regina, Saskatchewan
- Collège Mathieu in Gravelbourg, Saskatchewan
- Université de Saint-Boniface in Winnipeg, Manitoba
- Université de Hearst in Hearst, Ontario
- Laurentian University in Sudbury, Ontario
- University of Sudbury in Sudbury, Ontario
- Collège Boréal based in Sudbury, Ontario
- Glendon College of York University in Toronto, Ontario
- Université de l'Ontario français in Toronto, Ontario
- Royal Military College of Canada in Kingston, Ontario
- Collège La Cité in Ottawa, Ontario
- University of Ottawa in Ottawa, Ontario
- Saint Paul University in Ottawa, Ontario
- Collège communautaire du Nouveau-Brunswick based in Bathurst, New Brunswick
- Université de Moncton in Moncton, New Brunswick
- Centre de Formation Médicale du Nouveau-Brunswick in Moncton, New Brunswick
- Collège de l'Île based in Wellington, Prince Edward Island
- Université Sainte-Anne in Pointe de l'Église, Nova Scotia

Most of these institutions were founded by members of the Catholic clergy to serve isolated francophone communities. While some institutions maintain religious missions, others have assumed specialized vocations such as the Royal Military College of Canada.

While some member institutions only offer study programs in French, others are bilingual (English/French). Some of the institutions are located in small francophone communities, while others are located in heavily populated francophone areas.

The Maritime College of Forest Technology/Collège de Technologie forestière des Maritimes is not a member of the Association, although it is bilingual. There are no institutions in Newfoundland, Yukon Territory or Nunavut Territory.

The office of the association is located at: 260, rue Dalhousie, bureau 400 Ottawa, Ontario K1N 7E4

== Canadian Francophonie Scholarships Program ==
The AUCC has been the executing agency of the Canadian Francophonie Scholarship Program (CFSP) since July 1, 2006. The Government of Canada funds the CFSP program in its entirety. CFSP is a scholarship program which builds institutional capacities by training nationals of 37 developing countries of La Francophonie. The program is administered by the Canadian Partnership Branch of the Canadian International Development Agency (CIDA).

== National exchange program ==
The AUFC promotes student exchanges for undergraduate, Masters and doctoral students among member institutions.

== AUFC Action Plan ==
AUFC's action plan for 2007–2012 focuses on supporting its research community and the internationalization of member institutions. The AUFC wants to play a connecting role between Official Language Minority Community (OLMC) researchers and the federal funding agencies.

- creation of an advisory committee on research in June 2006,
- development of a strategy to enhance researchers' ability to obtain funding from research funding agencies (e.g. concerning Francophone minority communities).
- adoption of a support plan for research on Francophone minority communities on 31 May 2007
- implementation of priority activities of this plan

The action plan also aims to attract more students and increase the diversity of the student body.

== AUFC Research ==
A 2005 AUFC study evaluated the state of technological infrastructure within Canada's francophone universities and recommended on its future directions.

== AUFC Partners ==
AUFC partners include the Consortium national de formation en santé (CNFS), French Language Health Services Network of Eastern Ontario, Consortium des universités de la francophonie ontarienne (CUFO), and Agence universitaire de la Francophonie (AUF).
