= Alces (disambiguation) =

Alces is a genus of moose or elk.

Alces may also refer to:

== Biology ==
- Alces alces, the binomial species name for the Eurasian elk, also known as the moose in North America.
- Alces (journal), a scientific journal devoted to the biology and management of Alces alces
- Canis lupus alces, a subspecies of gray wolf
- Campylomormyrus alces, a species of electric fish

== Geography ==
- Alces River, a tributary of the Peace River in Canada
- Alces Lake, a lake in Whiteswan Lake Provincial Park, Canada

== Other uses ==
- Alces (mythology), in Greek myth, one of the sons of Aegyptus
- Alces Minor, a fictional star in the Dune series

== See also ==
- Alcis (disambiguation)
