= CCNB-Péninsule acadienne =

College campus in Shippagan, New Brunswick, Canada

The Collège Communautaire du Nouveau-Brunswick Péninsule acadienne is one of the five campuses of the higher education institution Collège communautaire du Nouveau-Brunswick (CCNB). It is located in Shippagan, New Brunswick, in the Acadian Peninsula.

The college is on avenue de l'Église, near the port of Shippagan and the University of Moncton. It was founded on April 1, 2000.
