= Vance Toner =

Vance Toner CM (born April 10, 1926 - died April 19, 2005) born in Riverview, New Brunswick was a Canadian sports and recreation director for the Université de Moncton. He was the creator and original director of the Université de Moncton physical education and recreation along with the Institute of Leadership. Toner received a Master of Science. He was appointed as a Member of the Order of Canada on April 17, 1997. Toner died on April 19, 2005.
