= CCNB =

CCNB may stand for:

- Collège communautaire du Nouveau-Brunswick
- Cyclin B1
