= Academy of Design =

Academy of Design may refer to:

- National Academy of Design in New York City
- RCC Institute of Technology
