= CCNB-Campbellton =

College campus in New Brunswick, Canada

The Collège communautaire du Nouveau-Brunswick Campbellton Campus is one of the five campuses of the higher education institution Collège communautaire du Nouveau-Brunswick (CCNB). It is located in Campbellton, New Brunswick, on Avenue Village.

The college was founded in 1970.
