= New Brunswick Community College =

College in New Brunswick, Canada

- Type: Public college
- Established: 1974
- Academic affiliations: CCAA, CICan, AUCC, CBIE
- Chairperson: Lindsay Bowman
- President: Mary Butler
- Faculty: 750 full-time & 80 part-time (including staff)
- Students: 4,000+ regular, 10,000+ continuing studies
- Location: Miramichi, Moncton, Fredericton (its head office), Saint John, St. Andrews and Woodstock, New Brunswick, Canada; 45°57′41.48″N 66°39′13.69″W
- Campus: Urban
- Website: www.nbcc.ca

New Brunswick Community College (NBCC) is a public college located throughout various locations in New Brunswick, Canada, including Moncton, Miramichi, Fredericton (its head office), Saint John, St. Andrews, and Woodstock.

New Brunswick Community College provides over 90 programs, offered at six campuses, First Nations sites, and regional delivery sites throughout the province of New Brunswick.

On May 29, 2010, New Brunswick Community College embarked on a self-governance model with the proclamation of the New Brunswick Community Colleges Act. The move established NBCC as an autonomous Crown Corporation whereby the president and CEO of the college report to an elected Board of Governors.

NBCC is a member of many national and international organizations, including Colleges and Institutes Canada (CICan). Through its membership with CICan, NBCC has signed the Indigenous Education Protocol.

== Programs ==
Former logo of the college

New Brunswick Community College offers over 90 regular programs across 18 sectors. It provides other training in many apprenticeable trades, to corporate clients, and individuals through part-time courses.

New Brunswick Community College was one of the first colleges in North America to offer a program in video game design.

=== International Projects and Research Initiatives ===
- Pan-Canadian Student Mobility Program (PSMP) (2004–2007), which provided numerous exchange opportunities between New Brunswick students and British Columbia students.
- New Brunswick Community College was a founding member in the formation of the Atlantic Colleges Tourism Education Consortia (ACTEC), whose membership included post-secondary education institutional representatives from the provinces of New Brunswick, Nova Scotia, and Prince Edward Island. ACTEC provided cross-institutional learning New Brunswick Community College for tourism students and professional development possibilities for faculty and staff in the industry.
- NBCC is a founding member of the Cross-border Higher Education Program, which provides a supported transition for college students who wish to continue academic pathways in post-secondary studies in bachelor's or master's degree programs. Member partners also include St. Stephen's University in St. Stephen, New Brunswick; Washington County Community College in Calais, Maine; and University of Maine in Machias, Maine.
- In 1999, New Brunswick Community College received the Canadian International Development Agency (CIDA) Award of Excellence for its Canadian College Partnership Programs work in Jordan.
- Again in 2002, New Brunswick Community College was recognized by the Canadian International Development Agency (Award of Excellence) for its international partnership with Universidad de Cienfuegos (UCF) in Cuba. Of critical importance for Universidad de Cienfuegos was the development and implementation of the Extension Services Centre.

== See also ==
- Higher education in New Brunswick
- List of universities in New Brunswick
- Canadian government scientific research organizations
- Canadian university scientific research organizations
- Canadian industrial research and development organizations
