= Kingswood University =

Private Christian university in Canada

- Former name: Bethany Bible College
- Motto: Equipping Servant Leaders for Global Impact
- Type: Private
- Established: 1945 (Woodstock, New Brunswick); Moved 1947 (Yarmouth, NS); Moved 1965 (Sussex, NB)
- Religious affiliation: Wesleyan Church; Christian Holiness Partnership; Evangelical Fellowship of Canada
- Academic affiliations: Association for Biblical Higher Education; Association of Christian Schools International; Christian Higher Education Canada
- President: Dr. Rick Christman
- Vice-president: Andrea Gunter
- Dean: Dr. Allen Lee
- Faculty: 26
- Administrative staff: 40
- Location: Sussex, New Brunswick, Canada
- Campus: Rural
- Colours: Black & red
- Website: www.kingswood.edu

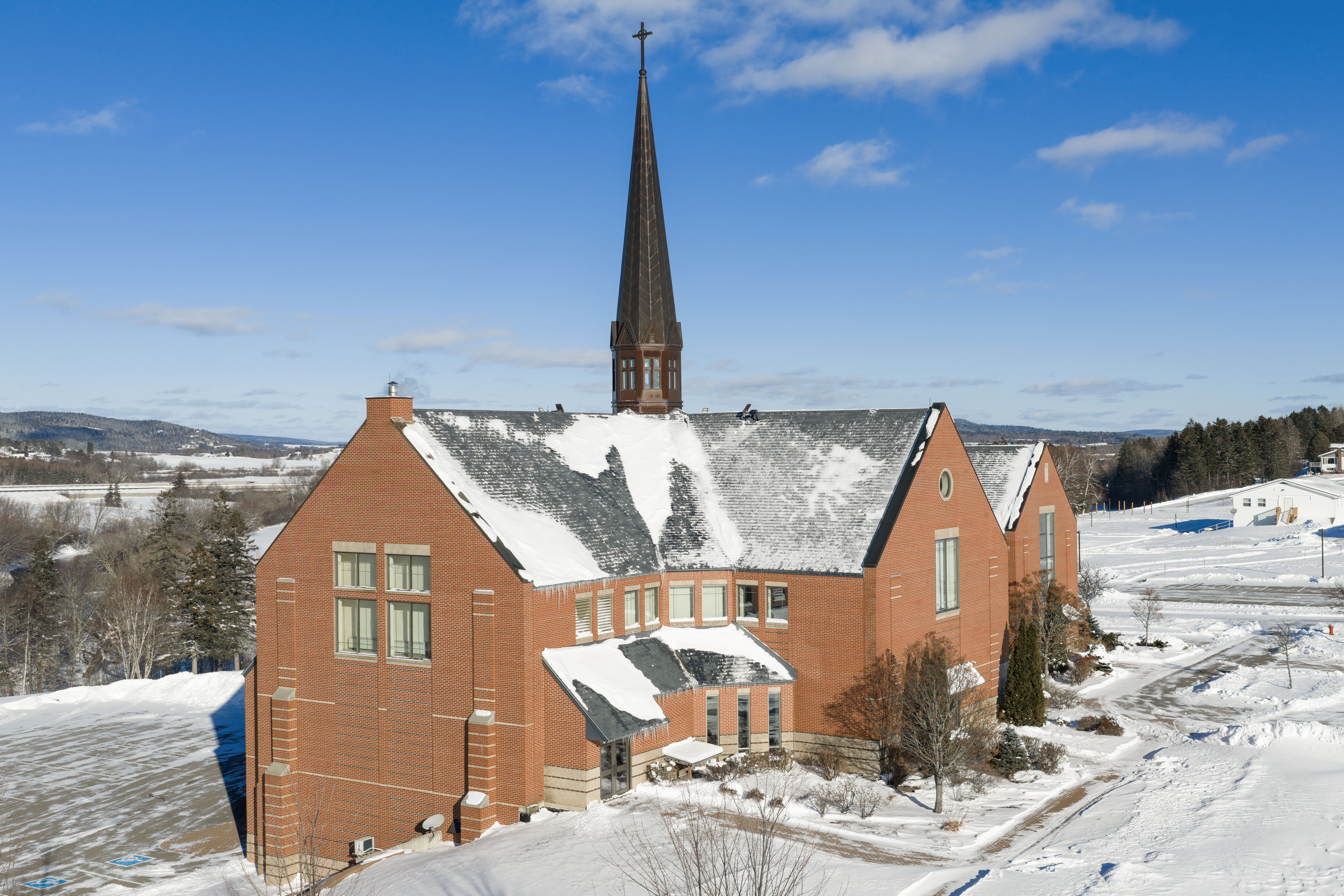
Saunders Irving Chapel, on the campus of Kingswood University

Kingswood University is an evangelical Christian university associated with the Wesleyan Church, located in Sussex, New Brunswick, Canada. It is accredited by the Commission on Accreditation of the Association for Biblical Higher Education. It is chartered by the province of New Brunswick and authorized to confer degrees in church-related education. The university is also registered with the Evangelical Fellowship of Canada, the Association of Christian Schools International, and the Christian Higher Education Canada (CHEC).

== History ==
Kingswood University was founded in October 1945, in Woodstock, New Brunswick by the Alliance of the Reformed Baptist Church of Canada as the Holiness Bible Institute. Its primary purpose was the training of ministers to serve the Reformed Baptist Church within the Atlantic region. In 1947, the school was relocated to Yarmouth, Nova Scotia and renamed Bethany Bible College.

In 1965, Bethany relocated a second time to its present location in Sussex, New Brunswick. In July 1966, the Alliance of the Reformed Baptist Church of Canada joined the Wesleyan Methodist Church. Two years later in June 1968, the Wesleyan Methodist Church merged with the Pilgrim Holiness Church to form what is known today as The Wesleyan Church.

Over the course of time, the university has made significant advances in its academic programs. In May 1970, the General Board of Administration of The Wesleyan Church authorized Bethany Bible College to award the Bachelor of Arts Degree in Religion, the basic four-year program for those entering full-time ministerial service. In 1983, the Province of New Brunswick, through official legislation, authorized Bethany to grant church-related degrees. Accreditation was granted in 1987 by the Association for Biblical Higher Education and reaffirmed in 1997.

In the fall of 2011, the name of Bethany Bible College was formally changed to Kingswood University.

On July 1, 2015, Dr. Stephen J. Lennox became Kingswood's 12th president of the university.

On February 3, 2025, Kingswood University announced the appointment of Dr. Rick A. Christman as President-Elect. Dr. Christman was officially inaugurated as the 13th President of Kingswood University on October 17, 2025.

In 2025, Kingswood University celebrated 80 years of equipping servant leaders for global impact. "Reflecting on Kingswood’s identity, Dr. Christman affirmed, 'Kingswood’s purpose has always been singular and sacred: to serve Jesus Christ by strengthening the local and global church through forming Christ-like servant leaders in a community that creatively blends academic excellence and practical ministry experience with intentional spiritual formation.' He continued, 'We are a university rooted in the holiness tradition, dedicated to deep biblical knowledge and genuine spiritual formation. That commitment will never waver.'"

== Campus ==
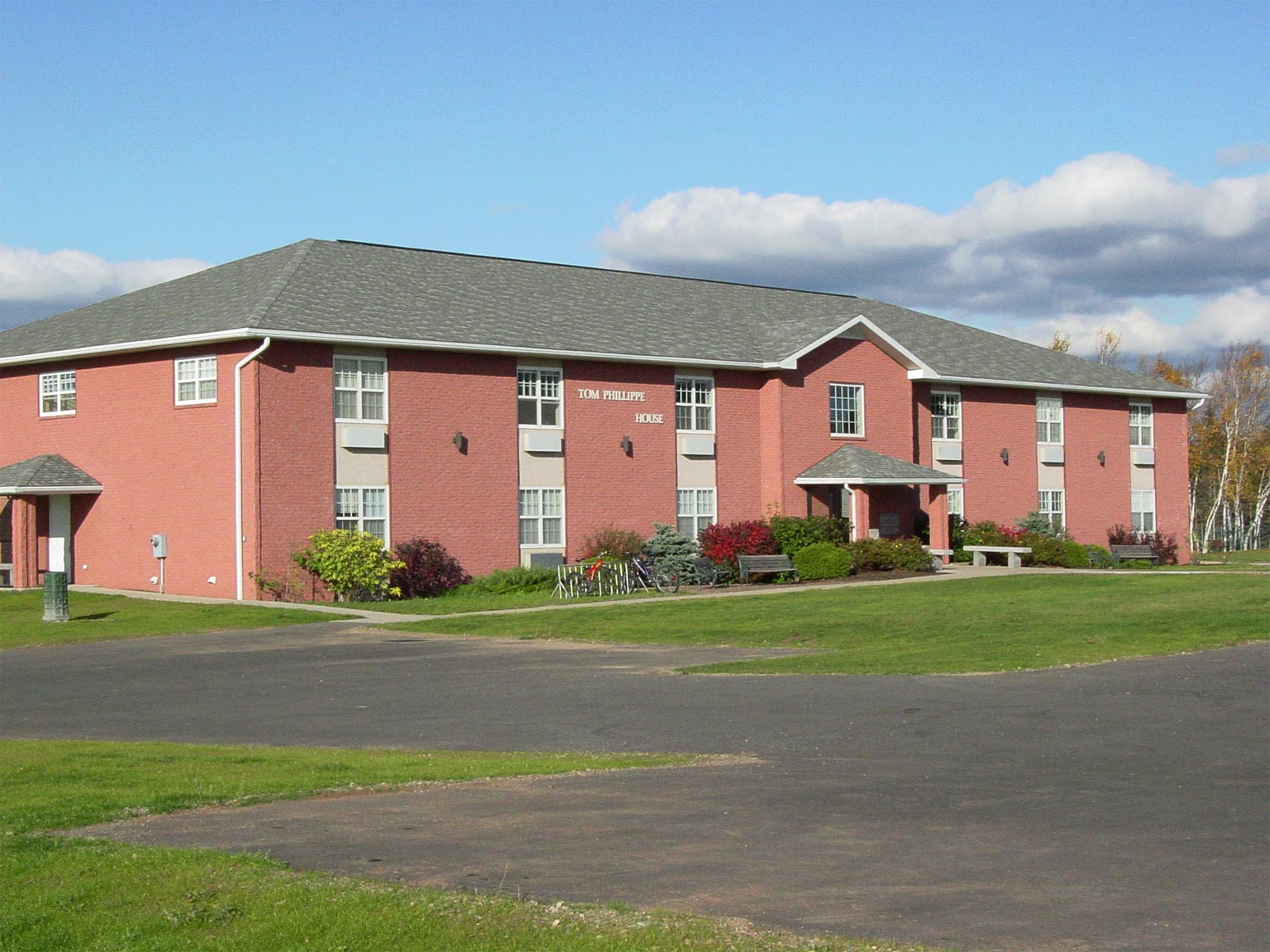
Kingswood University Tom Phillippe House.

Kingswood University's campus is located on the west side of Sussex, New Brunswick, about 80 km west of Moncton, New Brunswick and about 70 km east of Saint John, New Brunswick. The campus is split between an Upper Campus, which is where Stairs Hall, Saunders Irving Chapel, Mitchell Student Centre, Ingersoll House, Joan Philippe House (JP), Tom Philippe House (TP), Edgett Hall, Academic Building, Bridgeo House, Benson Athletic Complex and the Townhouse are located, and a Lower Campus, where the Burbury Administration Building and Nicholson Hall is located.

In 2008, the Saunders Irving Chapel & Wesley Hall was completed and dedicated, serving as a staple of Kingswood's campus.

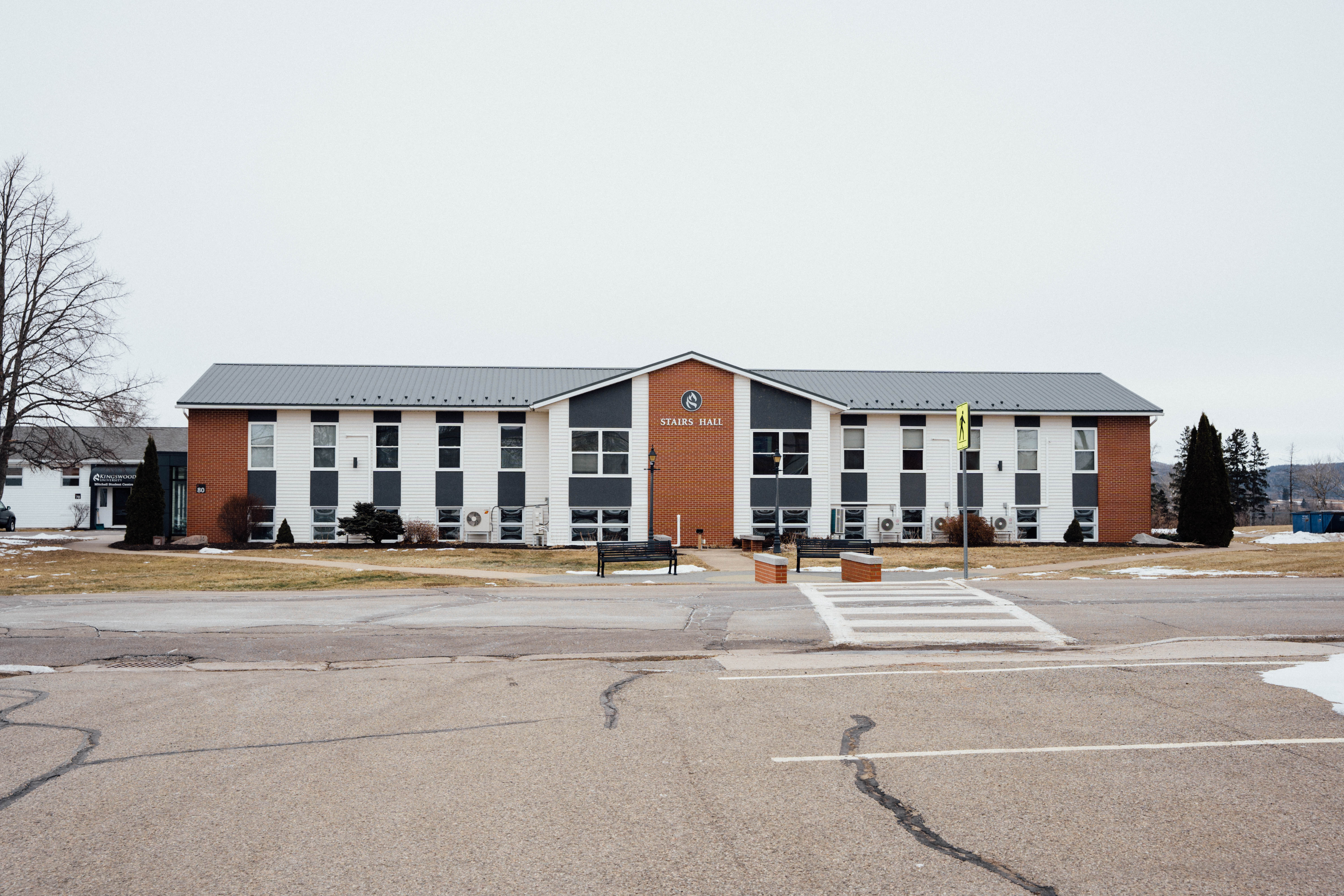
Kingswood University Stairs Hall after renovations

== Academics ==
=== Degrees offered ===
- Master of Arts in Clinical Mental Health Counselling
- Master of Arts in Pastoral Theology
- Master of Business Administration
- Bachelor of Theology
- Bachelor of Arts in Christian School Education
- Bachelor of Arts in Ministry
- Bachelor of Arts in Business Management
- Bachelor of Arts in Christian Counselling
- Bachelor of Arts in Worship Leadership
- Bachelor of Arts in Sports & Recreation Management
- Associate of Arts in Biblical Studies
- Associate of Arts in Evangelism & Compassion Ministry (PRAXIS)
- Associate of Arts in Biblical Studies

=== Major and Minor programs of study ===
- Evangelism & Social Justice
- Marketplace Ministry
- NextGen Ministry
- Intercultural Studies
- Pastoral Ministry & Church Planting

=== Gap Year Program ===
- Elements

=== Intramural sports ===
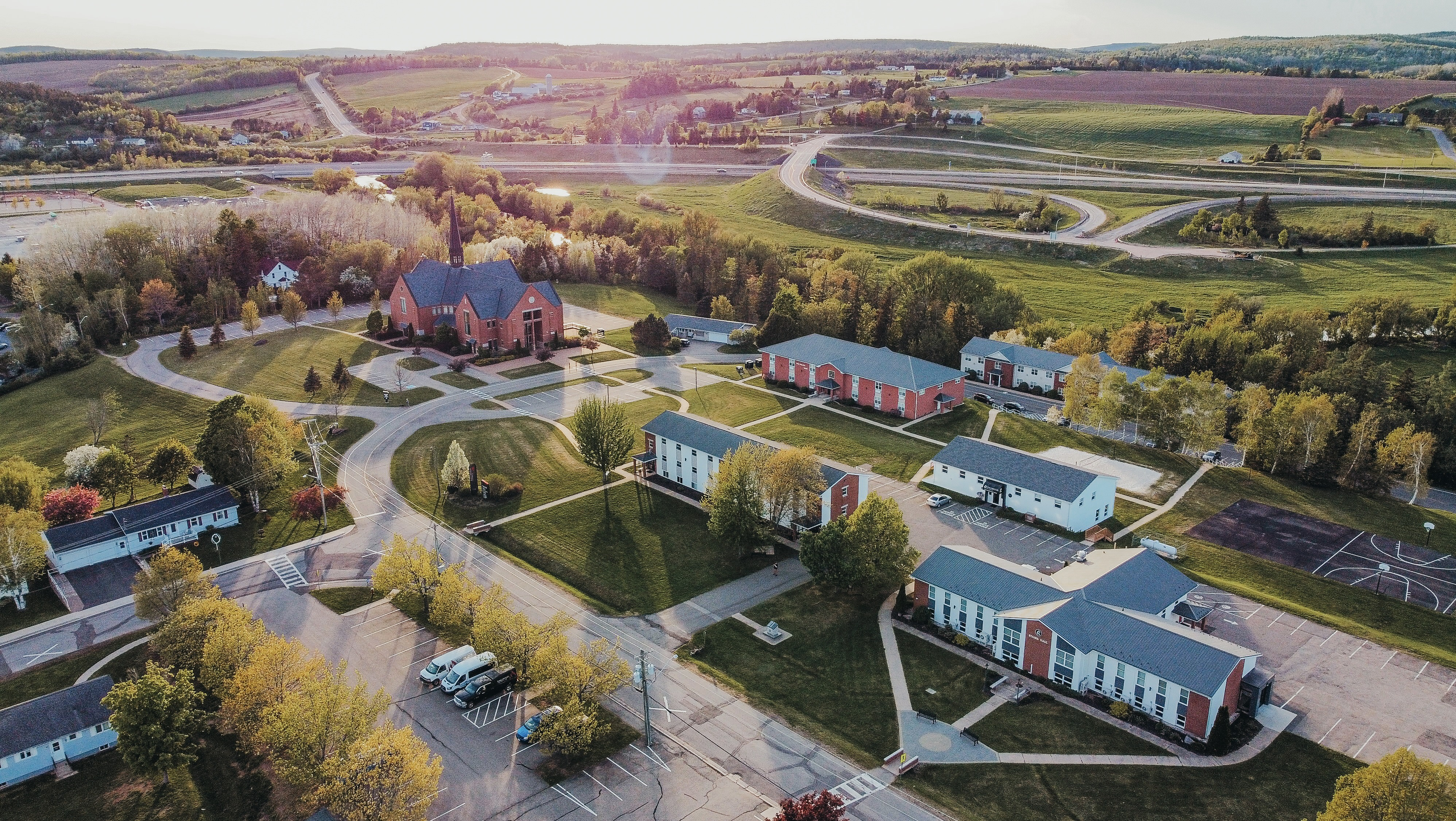
Aerial view of Kingswood's Campus

Hockey, Skating, Basketball, Beach Volleyball, Soccer, Table Tennis

=== Other leisure and recreational activities ===
- Canoeing and kayaking the Kennebecasis River and Saint John River
- Cross-country skiing at Fundy National Park or the walking trails of Sussex
- Downhill skiing and snowboarding at the nearby Poley Mountain Ski Resort
- Golfing and Curling at the Sussex Golf & Curling Club
- Hiking and camping at Fundy Park, Caton's Island or the nearby "bluff"
- Horseback riding at Snider Mountain Ranch
- Ice skating at the 8th Hussars arena
- Sea kayaking in Alma, New Brunswick on the Bay of Fundy
- Skateboarding at the 8th Hussars sports arena (Via outdoor fenced in skate park)
- Walking trails of Sussex
- Hiking at the Fundy Trail Parkway in Fundy-St. Martins

== Notable alumni ==
- Dr. Eric Hallett, Superintendent for the Wesleyan Church's Central Canada District
- Michael Tapper, author and professor at Indiana Wesleyan University

== See also ==
- Higher education in New Brunswick
- List of universities and colleges in New Brunswick
