= Campus Universitaire d'Edmundston =

Coordinates: 47.370539°N 68.315716°W

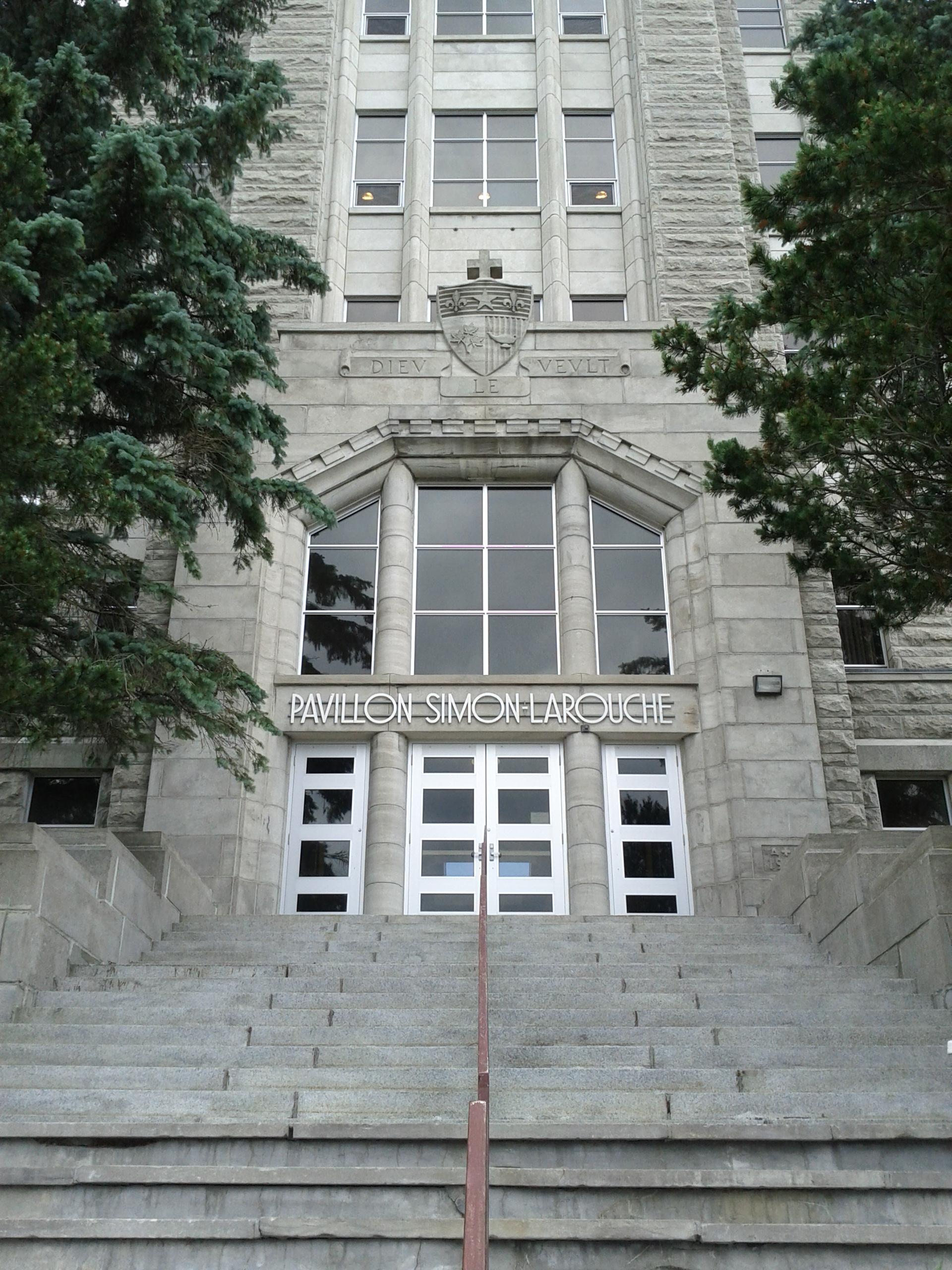
The Simon-Larouche building at the Université de Moncton campus d'Edmundston.

The Edmundston campus of the Université de Moncton is built on an elevated area of the downtown core, near the Trans-Canada Highway. It has four pavilions, a student center and a residence with the capacity to house nearly 90 students. It welcomes more than 375 students. The Pavillon sportif d'Edmundston is located on the campus grounds and includes a swimming pool, a climbing wall, different gymnasiums and more. A 2 400-seat amphitheatre used for field hockey and shows is also located next to the Pavillon sportif. Outside, there is a six-lane athletic field with bleachers.

== History ==
Prior to amalgamating with the Université de Moncton, the Edmundston campus was known as Collège Saint-Louis. Founded by the Eudist Fathers in 1946, it received the title of university the following year. Originally, the classes were temporarily installed in former military barracks. In 1949 the current campus was built, and its principal building was named the Simon-Larouche Pavillon after its first rector. In 1949, the Religious Hospitallers of Saint Joseph founded a college for girls called Collège Maillet in nearby Saint-Basile which was affiliated with the Université Saint-Louis.

With the foundation of the Université de Moncton in 1963, the Université Saint-Louis agreed to suspend its university status and once again became a college. In 1972, the Collège Saint-Louis and the Collège Maillet merged and adopted the name of Collège Saint-Louis-Maillet. In the 1977 reorganization, the college became a campus of the university and took the name of Centre universitaire Saint-Louis-Maillet, campus de l’Université de Moncton.

In the present, the campus is now called: Université de Moncton, campus d’Edmundston.

== Gallery ==
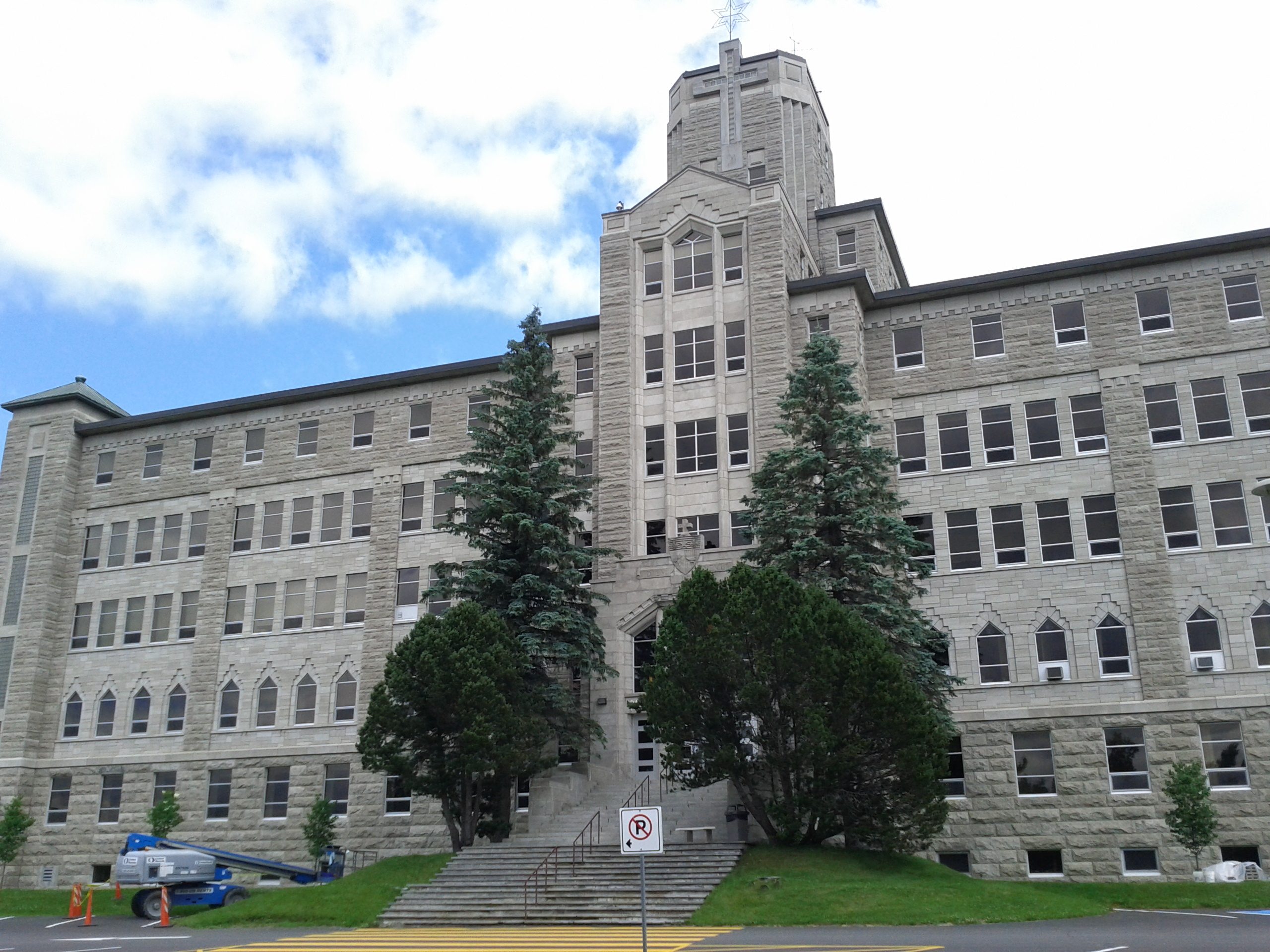
The art deco Simon-Larouche building was built in 1950.

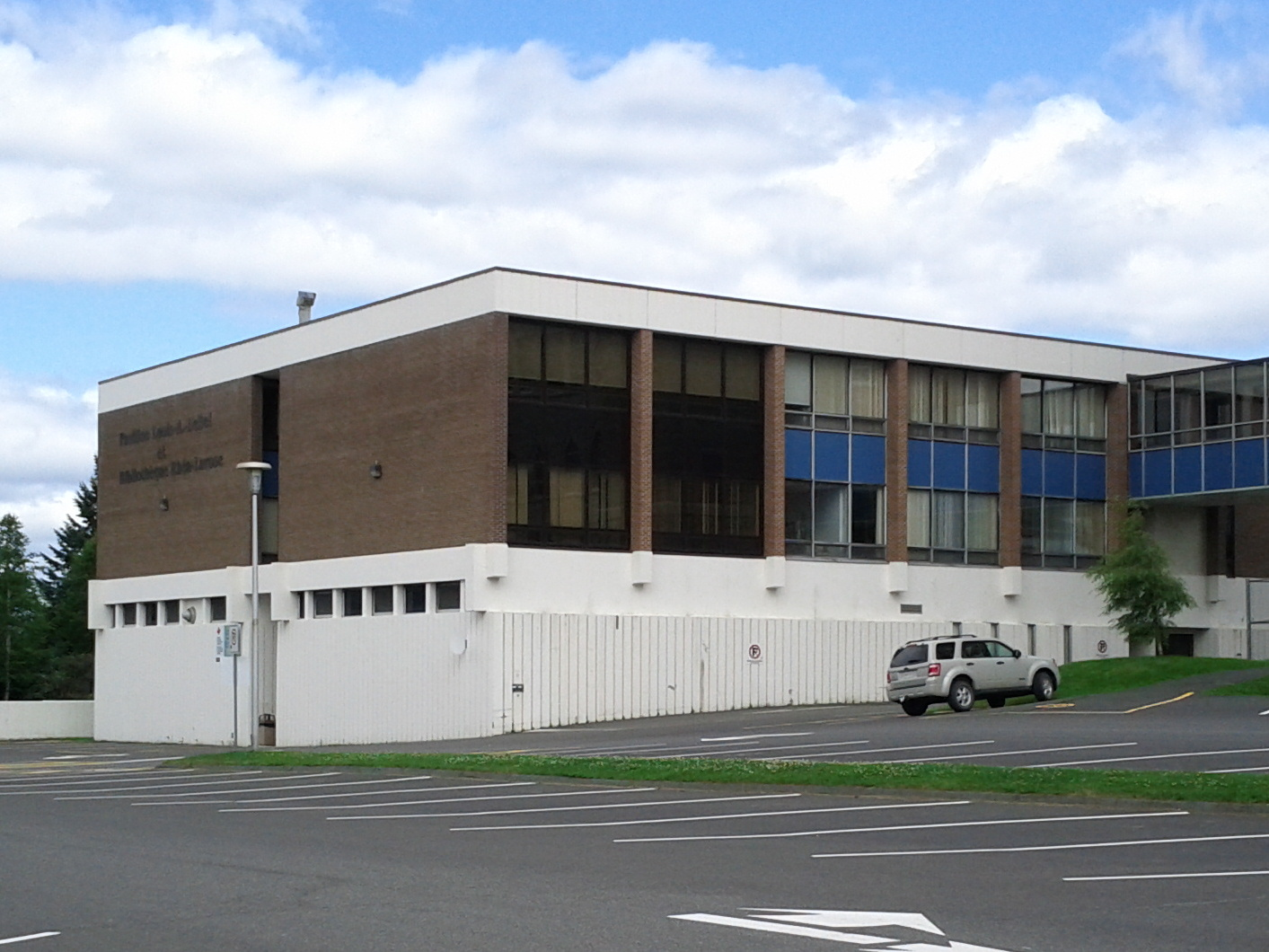
The Louis-J. Lebel building houses the Rhéa-Larose library.

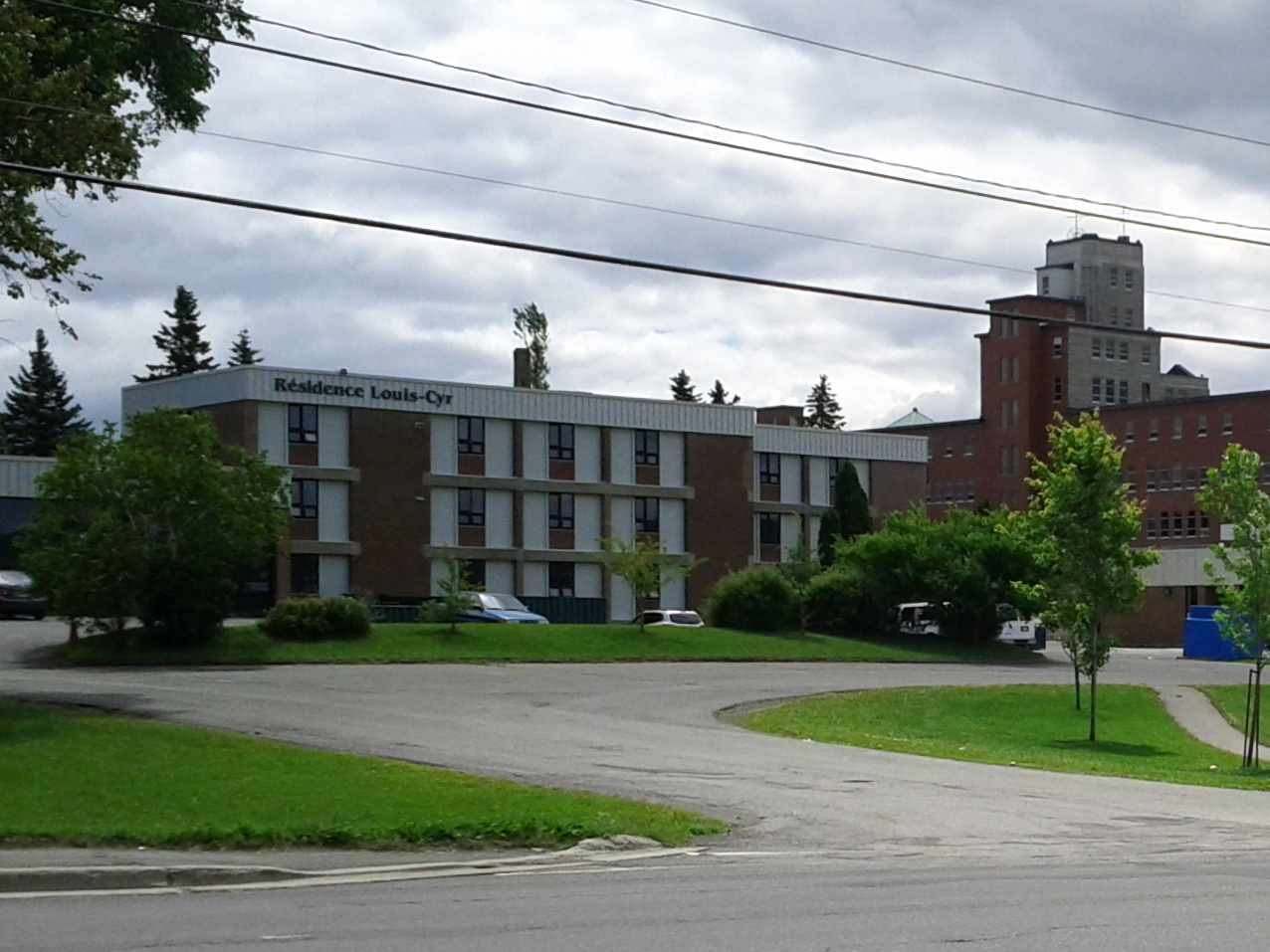
The 95-unit Louis-Cyr residence.
