= Jean-Guy Poitras =

Canadian badminton referee

Jean-Guy Poitras (born 1949) is a Canadian badminton referee, originally from Notre-Dame-de-Lourdes, in northwest New Brunswick.

He was a professor of physical education at the Edmundston Campus of the Université de Moncton and was Dean there from 1996 to 2001. He retired in 2013 from the university.

He has been involved in badminton since the 1970s and has refereed more than 600 international matches, including those in the 2000 Summer Olympics. 2006 he was elected to the New Brunswick Sports Hall of Fame, 2016 to Badminton Canada's Hall of Fame. 2019 he received the BWF Lifetime Achievement Award. He authored more than 60 publications, amongst them 2020 the book Badminton Pan Am, featuring the development, history, championship results and statistics, as well as champions of the sport.
