= CCNB-Edmundston =

College campuses in New Brunswick, Canada

The Collège communautaire du Nouveau-Brunswick Edmundston Campus is one of the five campuses of the higher education institution Collège communautaire du Nouveau-Brunswick (CCNB). It comprises a main campus in Edmundston and another in Grand Falls, New Brunswick.

The college was founded in 1965 and welcomes over 2,000 students each year.
