= CCNB-Bathurst =

College campus in Bathurst, New Brunswick, Canada

Coordinates: 47.621°N 65.674°W

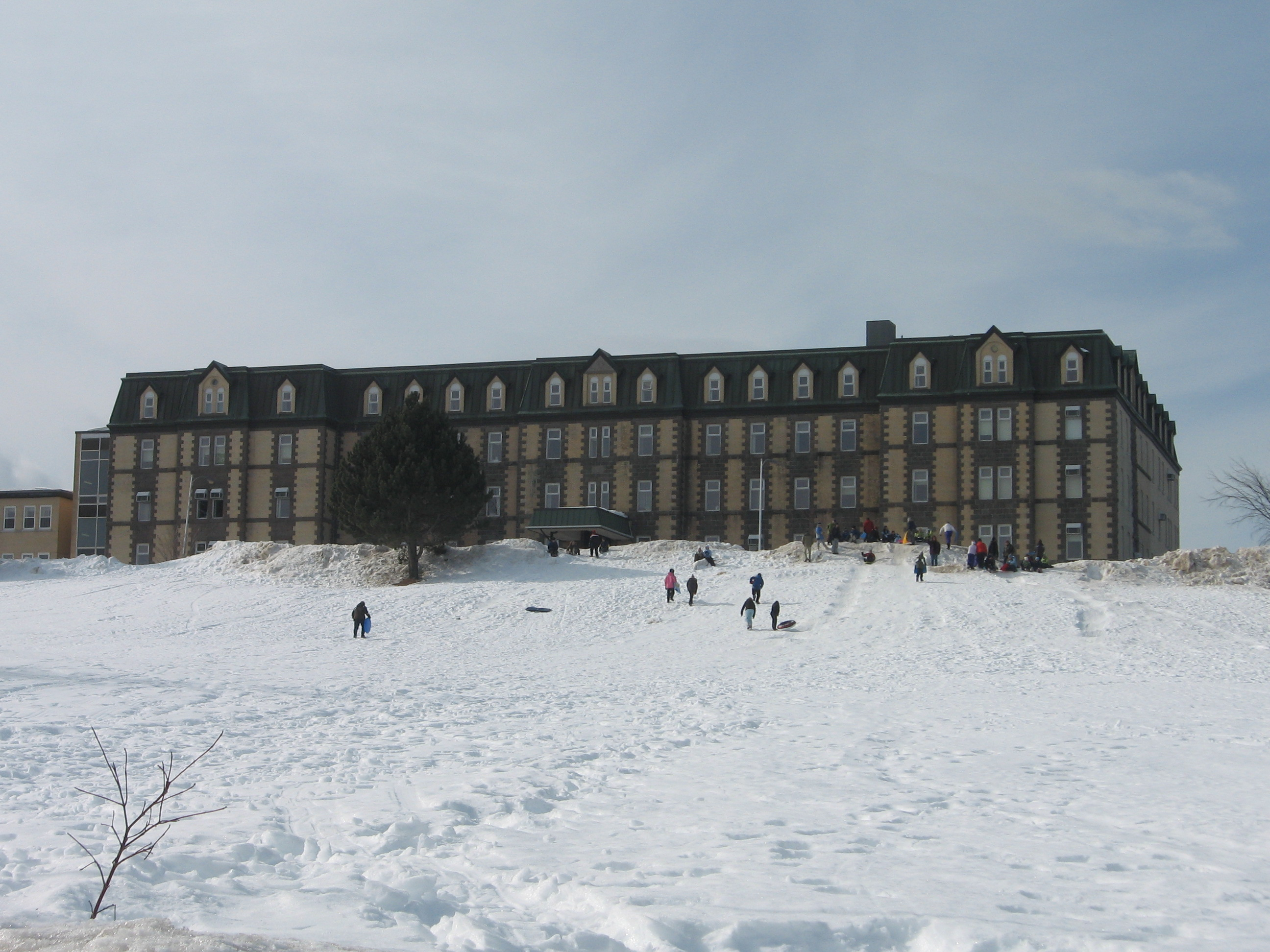
CCNB Bathurst, in 2008.

The Collège communautaire du Nouveau-Brunswick Bathurst Campus is one of the five campuses of the post-secondary educational institution Collège communautaire du Nouveau-Brunswick (CCNB). It is located in Bathurst, New Brunswick, Canada. CCNB is the heir of the Sacred Heart College, founded in 1899 in Caraquet, destroyed by fire in 1914 and rebuilt in Bathurst in 1921.
