= Alcis =

Alcis may refer to:

- Alcis (moth), a genus of geometer moths
- Alcis (gods), twin gods worshiped by the Naharvali, a tribe of ancient Germanic peoples
- Alcis, one the mythical Greek sisters, Androcleia and Alcis, who sacrificed themselves for their city

== See also ==
- Alces (disambiguation)
