= Alain Haché =

Canadian physicist (born 1970)

- Born: 1970 (age 55–56); Tracadie, New Brunswick, Canada
- Education: B.Sc. – Université de Moncton; Ph.D – University of Toronto
- Known for: Supraluminal phenomena in photonic crystals Canada Research Chair in Photonics 2003–2013
- Scientific career
- Fields: Physics, photonics, optics
- Workplaces: Université de Moncton
- Notable students: Louis Poirier

Alain Haché (born 1970) is an experimental physicist, a professor at the University of Moncton, Canada. From 2003 to 2013 he held the Canada Research Chair in photonics. He is also the author of The Physics of Hockey and Slap Shot Science, two popular science books on ice hockey.

Haché was born in Tracadie, New Brunswick in 1970. In 2002, he and undergraduate student Louis Poirier transmitted faster-than-light electrical pulses through a 120-metre long "photonic crystal" made of coaxial cables of alternating characteristic impedance (12 pairs of 50 Ω and 75 Ω cables). The experiment showed that the pulse envelope was recreated at the end of the cables at a speed of >3 c. This speed represents the group velocity, but the amplitude of the signal also drops in such a way that the energy transmitted never exceeds, at any given time, the energy that would have been transmitted by same pulse travelling in a vacuum.
