= Yorkville University =

Private for-profit university in Canada

- Type: Private, for-profit university
- Established: 2003
- Location: Canada
- Website: www.yorkvilleu.ca

Yorkville University is a private for-profit university established in 2003 with locations in Ontario, British Columbia, and New Brunswick, Canada. The university accepted its first students in the fall of 2004 for the programs offered out of Fredericton, New Brunswick, which was at the time the only establishment under Yorkville University. The university has since launched a brick-and-mortar campus in Vancouver, British Columbia, and acquired two brick-and-mortar campuses in Toronto, Ontario. In 2018 Yorkville acquired the RCC Institute of Technology. This included three schools: Academy of Design, School of Engineering Technology & Computing and the Toronto Film School.

== Academics ==
Yorkville University has been granted authority to offer degree programs in Ontario, British Columbia and New Brunswick, including Bachelor of Business Administration.

== Campuses ==
Yorkville does not have a traditional campus. All four locations are in office or business park settings:

- Fredericton, New Brunswick - a two-storey Administration building located at 100 Woodside Lane, Fredericton, New Brunswick
- Toronto, Ontario - Campus shares this location with the Toronto Film School at 460 Yonge Street, Toronto, Ontario
- Concord, Ontario - Campus is located at the former RCC Institute of Technology and shared with the Toronto Film School at 2000 Steeles Avenue West, Toronto, Ontario
- Vancouver, British Columbia - shared commercial structure with Sprott Shaw College and dental office in late 2022 at 88 Sixth Street, Suite 300, New Westminster, British Columbia; previous the university was located at 1090 West Georgia Street from June 2017 (and likely took space formerly used by Adler University’s satellite campus in Vancouver.).

== See also ==
- For-profit education
- Higher education in New Brunswick
- List of universities and colleges in New Brunswick
- RCC Institute of Technology
