= CCNB-Dieppe =

College campus in Dieppe, New Brunswick, Canada

Coordinates: 46.1003°N 64.7389°W

The Collège communautaire du Nouveau-Brunswick Dieppe Campus is one of the five campuses of the higher education institution Collège communautaire du Nouveau-Brunswick (CCNB). It is located in Dieppe, New Brunswick.
