= Alces (journal) =

- Discipline: Biology and management of Moose
- Language: English

Publication details
- History: 1963–present
- Publisher: Lakehead University (CA)
- Frequency: Annual

Standard abbreviations
- ISO 4: Alces

Indexing
- ISSN: 0835-5851

Links
- Journal homepage

Alces is a peer-reviewed scientific journal that publishes original papers on the biology and management of moose (Alces alces) throughout their circumpolar distribution, as well as other ungulate or carnivore species that overlap their range. It has been edited in published in Lakehead University (Thunder Bay, Ontario) since 1978. A single volume per year is published; a volume has one or sometimes two issues, with occasional supplements.

== History ==
The history of the Alces journal is connected with the North American Moose Conference and Workshop, whose Annual Meetings have taken place since 1963. From the early days, a summary of the events was produced for each meeting in mimeographed form. Since the Fifth meeting of the conference in Alaska in 1968, formal publication of conference proceedings started, becoming regular annual issues since 1972. These proceedings are considered the predecessor of the Alces journal, and are including in the numbering of its volumes. The name Alces was adapted for the journal in 1981 (volume 17).

== Special issues ==
Alces has also had special issues for several of the International Moose Symposia. While the materials of the First International Moose Symposium (Québec City, 1973) and Second International Moose Symposium (Uppsala, 1984) appeared in other journals, the proceedings of the Third (Syktyvkar, 1990), Fourth (Fairbanks, 1997) and Fifth (Øyer, Norway) International Moose Symposia appeared as supplements or special issues of Alces.

== Content ==
While the majority of the articles in Alces still originate from conference papers, an increasing proportion of the manuscripts are submitted directly to the journal by researchers in Canada, United States, Norway, Sweden, Finland, Germany, Russia, and China.

== Staff ==
The first permanent editor of Alces (from 1978 to 1982) was Harold Cumming of the Lakehead University School of Forestry. A number of Canadian and US scientists have edited the journal since then; as of 2006, the co-editors are Art Rodgers and Gerry Redmond (Maritime College of Forest Technology, Fredericton, New Brunswick).
