= RCC Institute of Technology =

Private education institute in Toronto, Canada

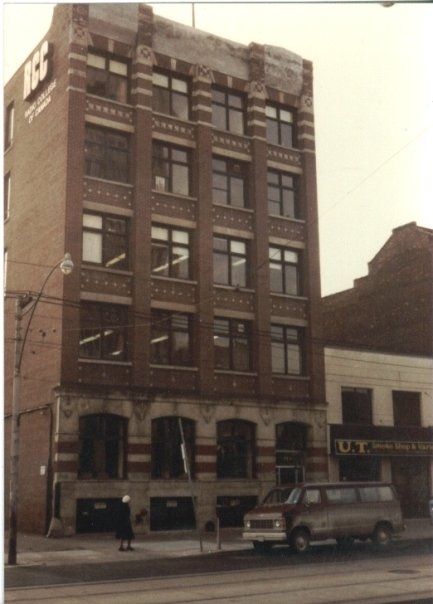
- The former Radio College of Canada building on College Street in Toronto, circa 1982
- Other name: Yorkville University/Ontario
- Former name: Radio College of Canada
- Motto: Real World Education
- Type: Private
- Established: 1928
- Affiliations: CTAB; OACETT
- Academic affiliations: Yorkville University
- President: Rick Davey
- Location: 2000 Steeles Ave. West, Toronto, Ontario, Canada
- Campus: Urban
- Website: www.rccit.ca

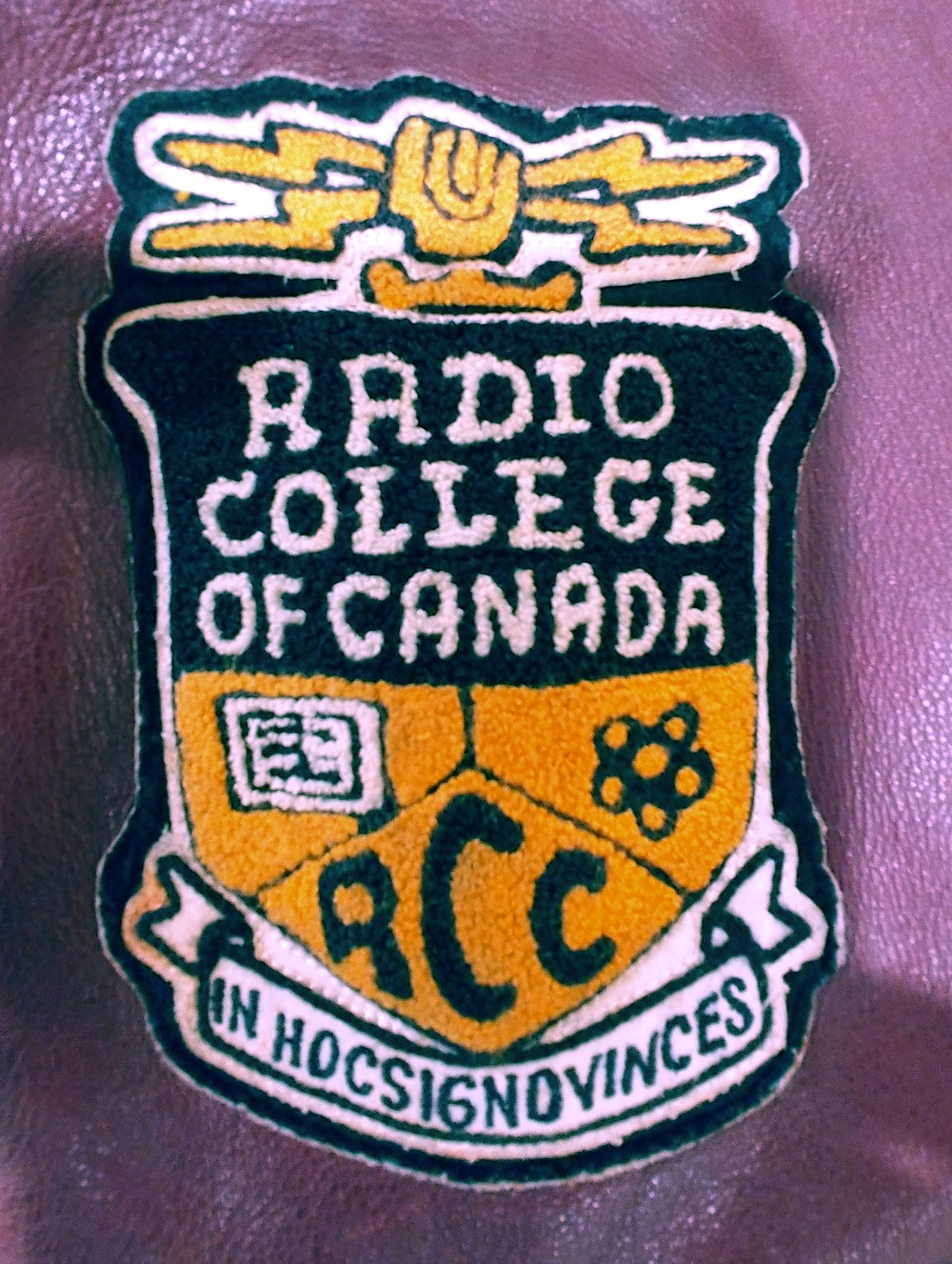
Radio College of Canada (RCC) Crest - 1982, Motto along bottom: "In hoc signo vinces" is a Latin phrase conventionally translated into English as "In this sign thou shalt conquer".

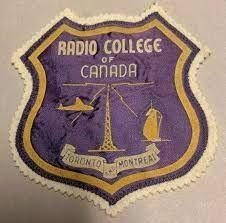
An older version of the school crest prior to 1970's

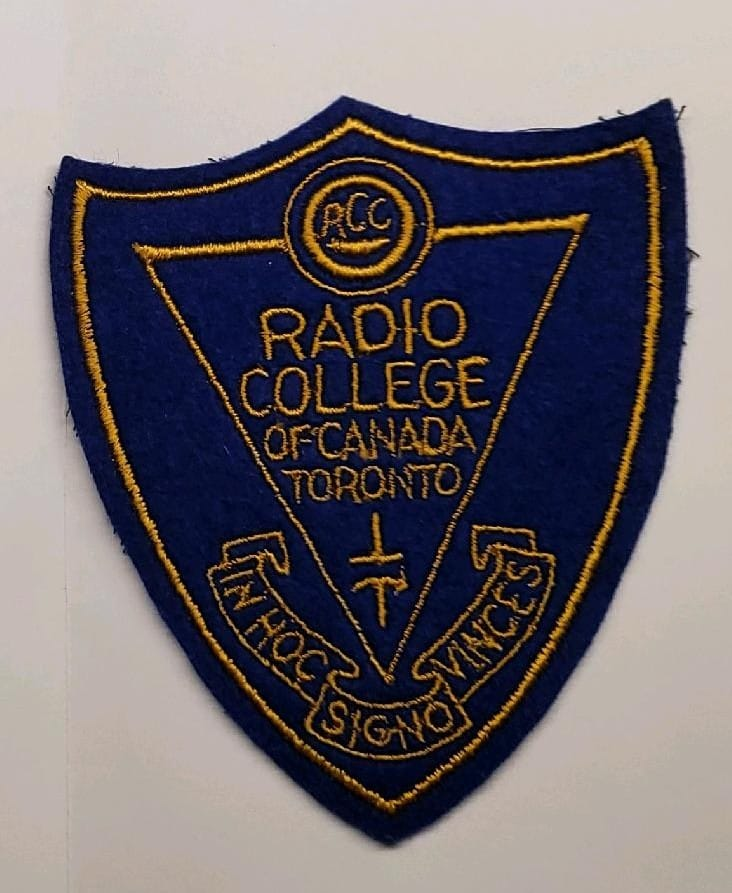
An older version of the school crest prior to the 1970's.

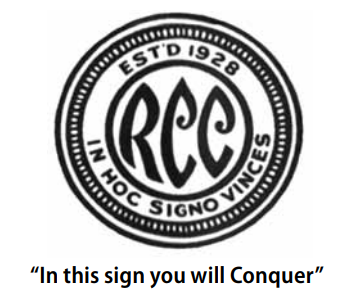

RCC Institute of Technology (RCC) was founded as the Radio College of Canada in 1928, making it one of the oldest private technology institutions in Canada. It is also the only private educational institute in Ontario to be approved by the Ministry of Training, Colleges and Universities to grant bachelor's degrees. In 2018, Yorkville University acquired RCC Institute of Technology. It was amalgamated with Yorkville to become Yorkville University/Ontario.

== History ==
Radio College of Canada (RCC) was founded in 1928 by J. C. Wilson, who had previously amassed considerable radio experience in England and the United States. At the same time he established RCC Publications, which continues to supply technical data to service technicians in Canada.

In 1930, as reported by The Globe newspaper, Rogers-Majestic Corporation and Radio College of Canada established a plan for registering radio servicemen of the entire Dominion. Examining and qualifying those who wished to become registered became RCC's role.

In 1937 the college was acquired by R. Christopher Dobson. Shortly thereafter, additional and more advanced training programs were added, including courses in commercial radio operation. During this period the demand for radio operators increased sharply with the growth in aviation; consequently large classes of radio operators were trained for the Federal Department of Transport.

In the 1940s Canada's contribution to the World War II effort required immediate and large-scale planning to ensure an adequate and continuing supply of well-trained technicians and operators. Training for Canada and allied governments was performed for essential services such as government departments, Merchant Marines, and, of course, the important manufacturing industry. Radio College established additional facilities and developed specialized training programs for the purpose.

Several classes of women radio operators for the air stations established across the country by the Commonwealth air training scheme were trained. The students, who came from all parts of Canada, were selected by aptitude tests developed by the college. Radio College also furnished room, board, nursing and general supervision. After the war the college did extensive rehabilitation training for Canadian and United States veterans, and later for civilians under government auspices.

Many Merchant Marine graduates of RCC have later requested from the college proof of their graduation and marine placement, thereby entitling them to the federal pension recently granted to World War II members of the Merchant Marine.

When television started in the 1950s, the college trained factory and service personnel. The college developed a new concept in electronics education, electronic engineering technology, a high-level program designed to train "technologists" who would be equipped to assist professional engineers in matters of applied technology, thereby releasing the engineer for matters requiring more engineering expertise, a concept that exists today in most post-secondary technical institutes.

RCC had a school located in Montreal on St. Denis street in the 1950s.

In 1957 the Association of Professional Engineers of the Province of Ontario (APEO), now called Professional Engineers Ontario (PEO), appointed a Certification Board — a group of professional engineers — which included Robert Poulter, P.Eng., then president of Radio College. The board established standards for the certificates of qualified technologists and technicians, and also for the accreditation of schools offering advanced courses at the engineering technologist level.

Radio College of Canada and Ryerson Polytechnical Institute (today Toronto Metropolitan University) were the first schools to be awarded full accreditation. The certification and accreditation programs continue to be carried out under the authority of the Canadian Council of Technicians and Technologists (CCTT) and the Ontario Association of Certified Engineering Technicians and Technologists (OACETT) by the Canadian Technology Accreditation Board.

During the late 1960s and early 1970s, with the advent of digital electronics, RCC developed the curriculum to service the new digital, computer and microprocessor-based occupations in data communications, facsimile, mobile phone, and computer technology.

In the early 1990s Hartley Nichol, president since 1985, assumed full responsibility for the college, and RCC moved to its present facility, a campus on Steeles Avenue West in Vaughan, Ontario, north of Toronto. On its 70th anniversary in 1998 the Radio College of Canada changed its name to RCC College of Technology.

On June 24, 2004, the Ministry of Training, Colleges and Universities in Ontario, allowed RCC to grant bachelor's degrees after a successful audit by the Post-Secondary Education Quality Assessment Board (PEQAB).

In 2008, RCC Institute of Technology acquired the International Academy of Design and Technology, a well-known private college, founded in 1983 as the International Academy of Merchandising and Design. The acquisition expanded RCC's offerings, facilitating a convergence between design and technology education. The Academy of Design became part of the family of RCC Institute of Technology schools and offered programs in interior design, graphic design & interactive media, video game design & development, fashion design and fashion merchandising & marketing.

In 2010, RCC Institute of Technology reopened the Toronto Film School, adding programs in film production, scriptwriting for film and TV and acting for television, film and the theatre to its offerings.

In 2011, RCC Institute of Technology created a faculty for its electronics and technology program offerings called the School of Engineering Technology & Computing; a faculty created for the delivery of electronics technology programs under the RCC umbrella. In all, RCC Institute of Technology housed three different schools – Academy of Design, School of Engineering Technology & Computing and Toronto Film School.

In 2018, Yorkville University acquired RCC Institute of Technology, renaming it Yorkville University/Ontario.

== See also ==
- List of Ontario Universities
- Ontario Student Assistance Program
