= St. Stephen's University =

University

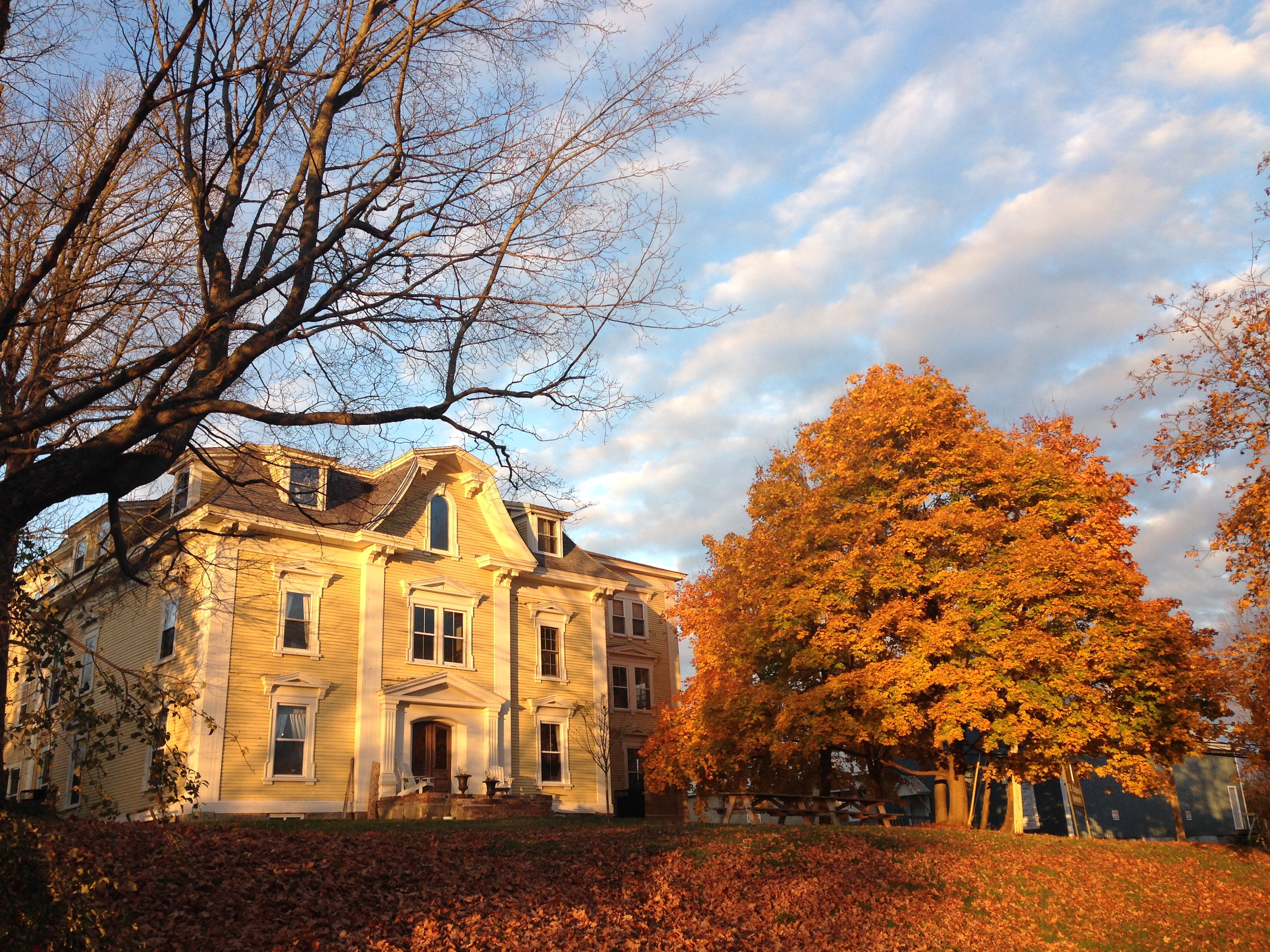
- Motto: Anchored with wings
- Type: Private chartered university
- Established: 1975
- Accreditation: chartered by the province of New Brunswick since 1998
- Religious affiliation: Non-denominational Christianity
- Provost: Andrew Phillip Klager
- Principal: Bradley Jersak
- Faculty: 6 core faculty; 18 affiliate faculty
- Students: 133
- Location: 8 Main Street, St. Stephen, New Brunswick, Canada; 45.1930°N 67.2820°W
- Colours: green and gray
- Website: www.ssu.ca
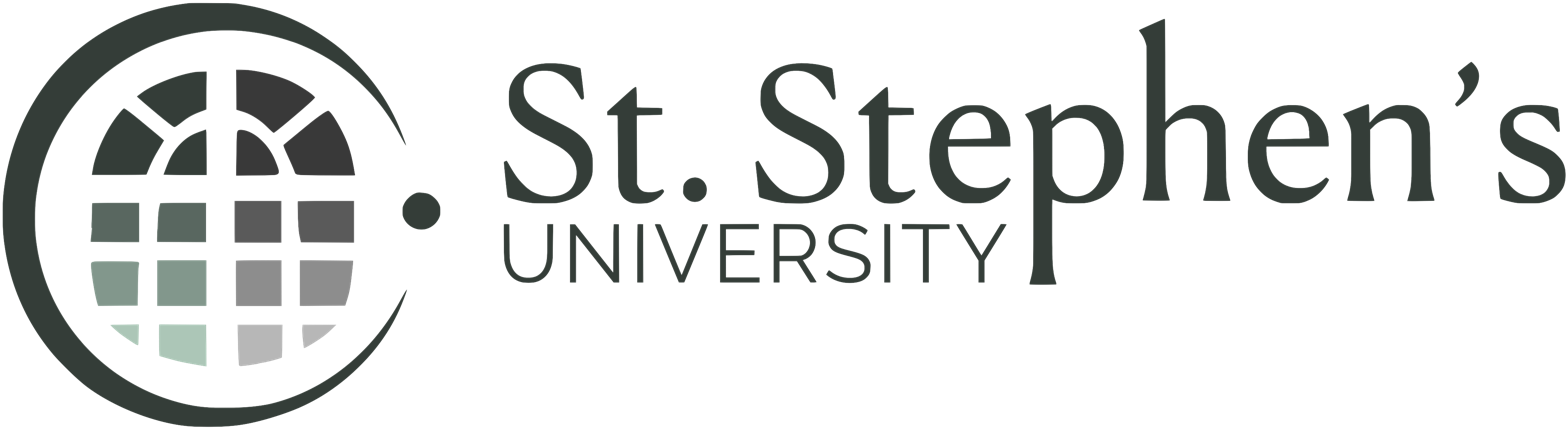

St. Stephen's University is a graduate studies university with an emphasis on theology, peace and reconciliation located in the town of St. Stephen, New Brunswick, Canada that offers mostly hybrid-distance master's degrees and graduate certificates. It is the mission of the university "to prepare people, through academic, personal, and spiritual development, for a life of justice, beauty, and compassion, enabling a humble, creative engagement with their world."

== History ==
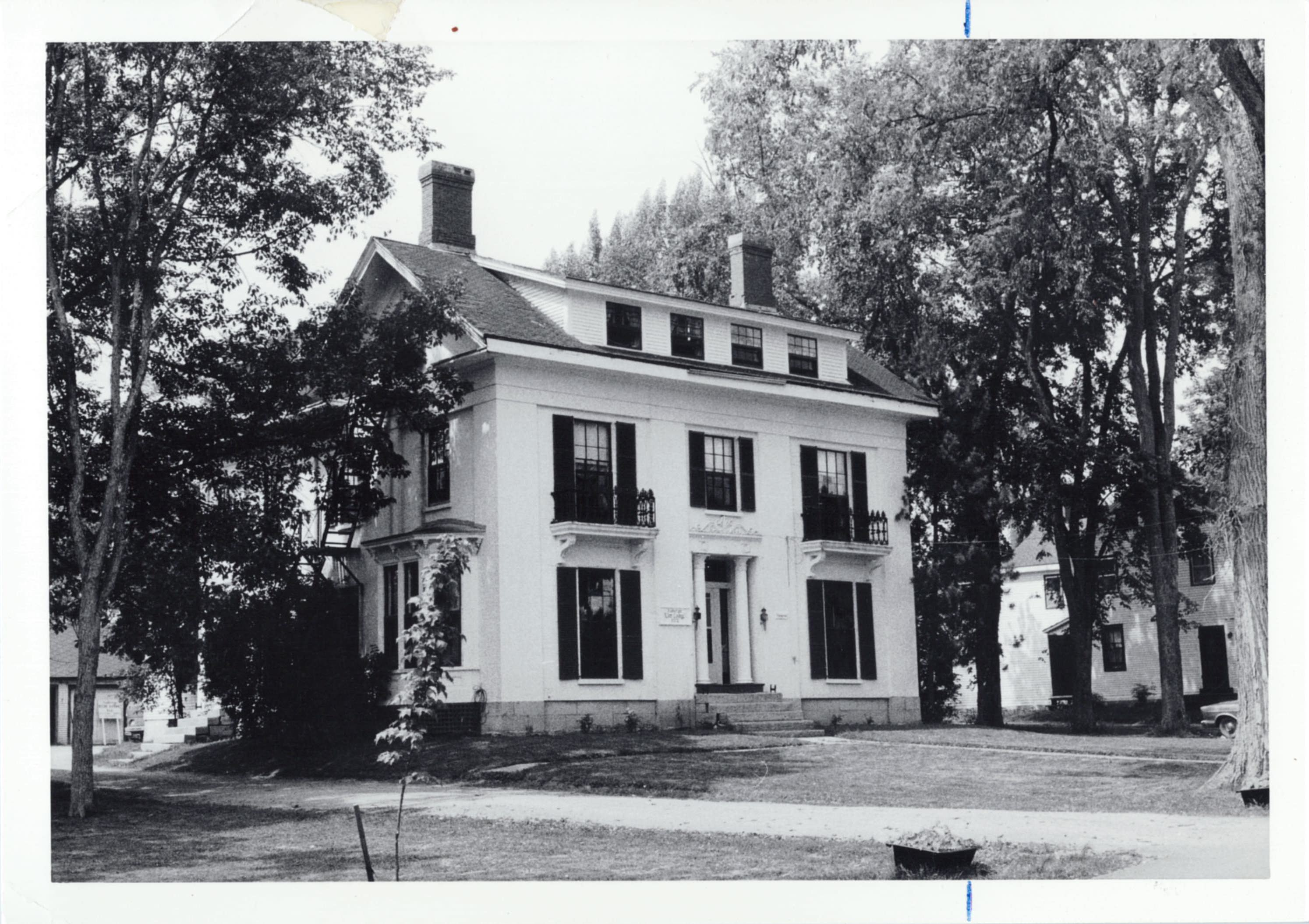
Elm Lodge was SSU's first building in 1975.

Planning for St. Stephen's University began in 1971, and it officially launched on July 15, 1975 with six students and a small group of faculty and staff. These first faculty and students met in rented spaces at Union Street Baptist Church and Todd Mansion in St. Stephen, and students lived in Elm Lodge. Then, SSU purchased the old Park Hotel in 1976 located at 8 Main Street, which became Park Hall and the centerpiece of the campus. SSU's first Board of Governors was assembled in 1978 to help stabilize the University after its first few challenging years. In the 1987–1988 academic year, SSU experienced a steep decline in enrolment from 25 to 15 students, and eventually to only 3 full-time students and 1 part-time student, but the Board of Governors permitted student recruitment for another year to rectify the issue, which eventually saved the University.

While travel-study terms have been a part of SSU's curricular delivery model from its inception, this was more intentionally integrated into the University programs in 1988 with travel-study terms in Europe and Asia were first offered. In 1995, SSU launched a pilot project of the Theology and Culture program under the leadership of the first Dean of this program, Peter Fitch, thus initiating SSU's foray into graduate studies that defines the University today. Gregg Finley was appointed the Dean of Arts in 1998.

On January 27, 2023, due to declining enrolment, the Board of Governors decided to suspend all undergraduate programs to focus on the development and delivery of its graduate studies programs. In 2024, SSU released its new strategic plan for the next three years called SSU Strategic Plan 2027: Anchored with Wings.

== Academics ==
St. Stephen's University was chartered by the province of New Brunswick in 1998 to grant both bachelor's and master's degrees in liberal arts and humanities. In 2003, SSU added new majors in its undergraduate programs in psychology and international studies in 2009, although these were suspended in 2023. Currently, SSU offers master's degrees and graduate certificates through its three schools as well as four certificates at the undergraduate level. All graduate programs at SSU are delivered through a combination of online courses, short in-person residencies on campus at SSU, and short study abroad trips. Travel is a unique and central component of academics at SSU, reflected in the current study abroad trip to Ireland that is part of all SSU's master's programs.

=== SSU School of Theology & Culture ===
The School of Theology and Culture is faith-based in the historic 'Jesus Way' gospel tradition of God's self-giving love. It offers a Master of Arts in Theology & Culture, a Master of Ministry in Theology & Culture, and a Certificate in Theology & Culture.

=== Jim Forest Institute for Religion, Peace and Justice ===
The Jim Forest Institute for Religion, Peace & Justice was founded in 2017 and is faith-engaged in its theological exploration of peace and justice, the inner transformation of a peacemaker, and multi-faith conversations and interreligious peacebuilding. It offers a Master of Arts in Peace & Justice, with both a thesis and an applied option, and a Master of Theological Studies in Peace & Justice, as well as certificates in Religion, Peace & Justice and Theology & Peace Studies.

=== Centre for Reconciliation Studies ===
The Centre for Reconciliation Studies is faith-affirming of First Nations spiritual values and traditions, gifts of the Creator, and all our relations. It offers a certificate in Theology & Culture and a certificate in Reconciliation Studies.

== Leadership ==
- Gregg Finley and Peter Fitch
- 2003–2018: Bob Cheatley
- 2019: Jeremy Barham
- 2020–2022: Margaret Anne Smith and Steve Robinson
- 2022–2023: Joe McGinn
- 2023–present: Bradley Jersak (principal) and Andrew Phillip Klager (provost and vice-chancellor)

== Campus ==
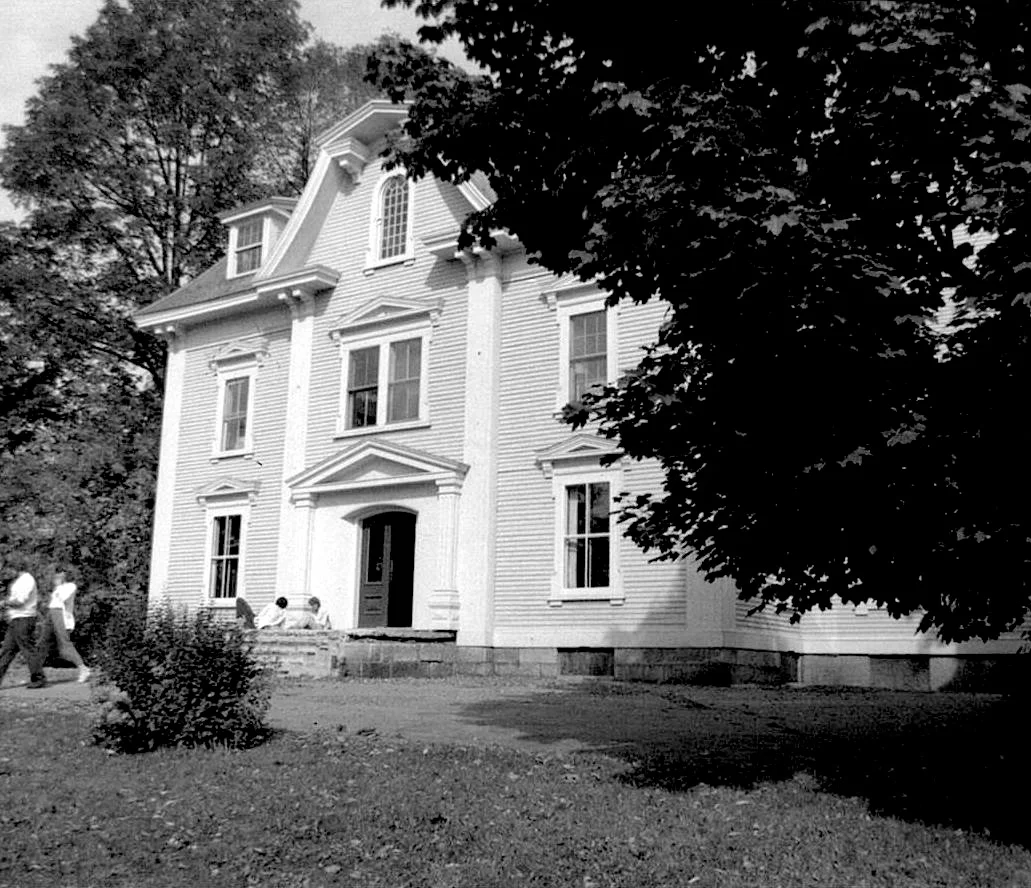
Park Hall during the early years of SSU's existence

St. Stephen's University has a small campus located on Main Street in the town of St. Stephen. The main building, Park Hall, dates to the time of Canadian Confederation in the 19th century and is built in the Italian Renaissance Revival style of architecture. The building houses administrative offices, academic facilities, and student accommodations for short residencies. After the suspension of SSU's undergraduate programs, the University is in the process of forming a new co-housing community of mature and independent adults who value learning and personal growth who will live in Park Hall. This initiative will including learning opportunities and public lectures, spiritual and creative development, and community meals and events.

== Faith identity ==
According to its statement on faith identity, SSU aspires to practice its faith identity in alignment with its mission's values of justice, beauty, and compassion, rather than denominational categories or doctrinal conformity. Its faculty, staff, and students express these values with conviction and freedom, inclusion and generosity. SSU aspires to challenge colonizing and exclusionary bounds of Christendom and set an open table where all are welcome.

== See also ==
- Higher education in New Brunswick
- List of universities in New Brunswick
