= Centre de formation médicale du Nouveau-Brunswick =

CFMNB
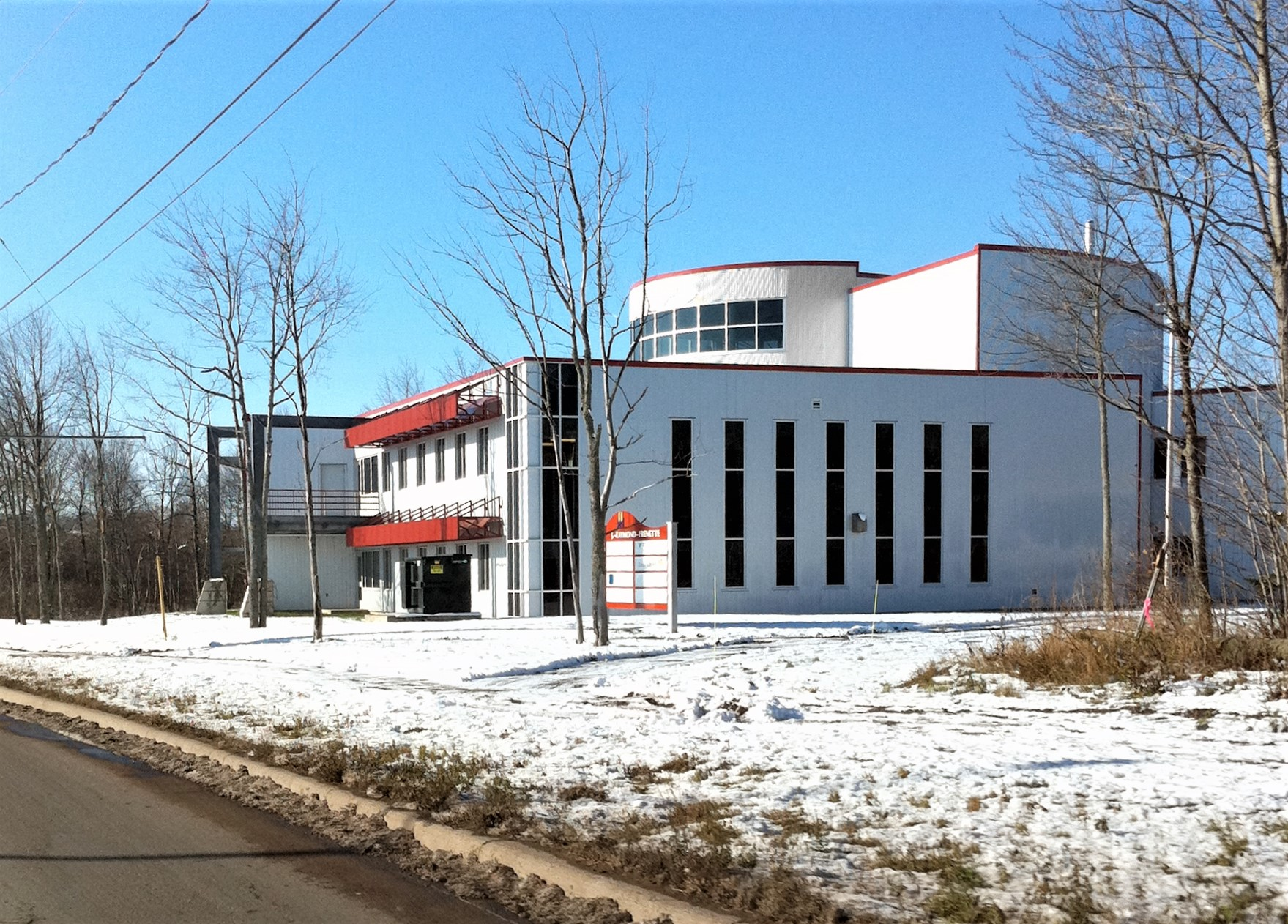
- Type: Public university
- Established: 2006
- Dean: Michel H. Landry
- Director: Michel H. Landry
- Academic staff: 24
- Students: ~100
- Location: Moncton, New Brunswick; 46°6′30.91″N 64°47′33.96″W
- Campus: Urban
- Website: www.umoncton.ca/medecine/ www.usherbrooke.ca/medecine/

The Centre de formation médicale du Nouveau-Brunswick (CFMNB) is a campus of the Université de Sherbrooke, in collaboration with and on the site of the Université de Moncton in Moncton, New Brunswick, Canada.

== History ==
Since the 1980s, the Government of New Brunswick has been committed to promoting a francophone medical education within the province. The CFMNB is of historical significance for the maritimes, for it represents the first opportunity for a francophone medical education outside the Quebec. (Note: The Faculty of Medicine at University of Ottawa is a bilingual and not a francophone institution.)

The first batch of students was accepted in 2006. They later graduated in 2010.

== Affiliations ==
The CFMNB is effectively administered by Université de Sherbrooke. However, since it is located on the site of Université de Moncton, the CFMNB and Université de Moncton share important local demographic interests. Access is granted for the students at the CFMNB to most services from Université de Moncton, and students are registered as members of both universities.

Practical medical training is offered at the Dr. Georges-L.-Dumont University Hospital Centre located nearby and in the clinics and private offices of the physicians associated with the Zone Beauséjour of the Réseau de santé Vitalité Health Network.

== Program ==
The medical education program offered by the CFMNB is recognized worldwide. While the MD program is of a four-year duration, an MD-MSc is also offered in five years.

== Research ==
The CFMNB has also been involved in medical research since 2008. The research sector of the Centre de formation médicale du Nouveau-Brunswick (CFMNB) contributes to the development of health research in the province through the funding of initiatives, the dissemination of its successes, the collaboration between various actors and organizations, and the training of students who will contribute to the research culture in New Brunswick.
