= Collège communautaire du Nouveau-Brunswick =

Coordinates: 47°37′17″N 65°40′26″W

- Motto: vision • passion • succès
- Type: Public community college
- Established: 1970
- Affiliations: CICan
- Location: Bathurst, Campbellton, Dieppe, Edmundston and Acadian Peninsula, New Brunswick, Canada
- Website: https://ccnb.ca

The Collège communautaire du Nouveau-Brunswick (CCNB) is a French-language institution of post-secondary education founded in 1970, that serves all the Francophone and Acadian communities in New Brunswick through its five campuses in Bathurst, Campbellton, Dieppe, Edmundston and the Acadian Peninsula.

== Campus ==
- CCNB-Bathurst and head office
- CCNB-Campbellton
- CCNB-Dieppe
- CCNB-Edmundston
- CCNB-Péninsule acadienne

== See also ==
- Higher education in New Brunswick
- List of universities and colleges in New Brunswick
