= Maritime College of Forest Technology =

- Type: Public
- Established: 1946
- Affiliations: CICan, IAU, CIS, AUS, AUFSC
- Chairperson: Heather Boyd
- Director: Michel LeBlanc
- Location: Fredericton and Bathurst, New Brunswick, Canada; 45.9331°N 66.6566°W (Fredericton location)
- Campus: Urban
- Colours: Green & white
- Website: www.mcft.ca

The Maritime College of Forest Technology (French: Collège de Technologie forestière des Maritimes) is a Canadian post-secondary college with campuses located in Fredericton, New Brunswick (English instruction) and Bathurst, New Brunswick (French instruction).

== History ==
The Maritime College of Forest Technology (MCFT), formerly the Maritime Forest Ranger School (MFRS), in Fredericton, New Brunswick was established in April 1946, as a co-operative effort of the provincial governments of New Brunswick and Nova Scotia, and the wood-using industries of the two provinces. The MCFT fulfils a regional mandate.

The original location for MFRS was on the grounds owned by the University of New Brunswick which housed Alexander College and is known today as the Fredericton Exhibition Grounds. In 1949 MFRS moved to its new location overlooking the Saint John River Valley; at that time MFRS was the sole occupant of the land until the new campus was constructed in 1986. The current campus is part of the Hugh John Flemming Forestry Centre and is shared with the Canadian Forest Service and Department of Natural Resources. Present facilities at the Fredericton Campus were completed in 1986. The francophone campus in Bathurst was established in 1980 and the campus is shared with the Collège communautaire du Nouveau-Brunswick.

From 1946 to 2003 the college was known as the Maritime Forest Ranger School and its curriculum was one year in length. In 2003 the college began its new two-year program and with that came the change in name to the Maritime College of Forest Technology. In 2008 MCFT began offering, in addition to the Forest Technology Program, an Advanced Diploma in Forest and Fish & Wildlife Technology.
