= Université de Moncton =

University in Canada

Coordinates: 46.105°N 64.7819°W

- Motto: Surge illuminare
- Motto in English: Arise and Be Enlightened
- Type: Public
- Established: 1963; 63 years ago (Merger of Collège Saint-Joseph, Collège du Sacré-Cœur and Collège Saint-Louis)
- Affiliations: AUCC, IAU, AUFC, AUS, AUFSC, CBIE, CUP.
- Chancellor: Madeleine Dubé
- Vice-Chancellor: Denis Prud'homme
- Rector: Denis Prud'homme
- Students: 6,271 (Fall 2026)
- Undergraduates: 5,330
- Postgraduates: 941
- Location: Edmundston, Moncton, Shippagan, New Brunswick, Canada
- Campus: Urban
- Colours: Blue and Gold
- Nicknames: Aigles Bleus (men), Aigles Bleues (women)
- Sporting affiliations: Atlantic University Sport
- Mascots: Super Bleu and Super Bleue (French)
- Website: umoncton.ca

The Université de Moncton is a Canadian French-language university in New Brunswick. It includes campuses in Edmundston, Moncton, and Shippagan.

The university was founded in 1963 following the recommendations of the royal commission on higher education in New Brunswick. Since then, the institution has been widely regarded as the heir to several Acadian institutions of higher learning such as the Collège Saint-Joseph.

The university offers training and research in the fields of business, arts, social sciences, law, engineering, sciences, health, social work, community services and education. Students come from New Brunswick, other provinces in Canada and internationally. The University offers nearly 198 programs in the three cycles of study.

== History ==
The Université de Moncton was born because of recommendations made in 1962 by a Commission of Inquiry on Higher Education in New Brunswick chaired by John J. Deutsch. The new university was created on June 19, 1963. Collège Saint-Joseph, the Université Sacré-Cœur in Bathurst, and the Université Saint-Louis d'Edmundston agreed to suspend their respective charters and assume the status of affiliated colleges (Collège Saint-Joseph, Collège de Bathurst, and Collège Saint-Louis). The new Université de Moncton took shape on land in Moncton's Sunny Brae neighbourhood.

In 1968, the university was rocked by student protests over a proposed tuition hike, which came to be regarded as a watershed moment in the history of Acadian culture. These were profiled by filmmakers Michel Brault and Pierre Perrault in the 1971 National Film Board of Canada documentary film Acadia, Acadia (L'Acadie, L'Acadie?!?).

In 1972, Collège Jésus-Marie in Shippagan was affiliated directly with the Université de Moncton and offered the first two years of the arts program.

Following recommendations made in 1975 by the Committee on Higher Education in the Francophone Sector in New Brunswick, chaired by Justice Louis A. LeBel, the Université de Moncton underwent a major reorganization. In 1977, the Université de Moncton became a university composed of three equal campuses, located in the three major francophone regions of the province: Edmundston, Moncton, and Shippagan. Collège Jésus-Marie became the Centre universitaire de Shippagan, campus de l’Université de Moncton, and Collège Saint-Louis-Maillet became the Centre universitaire Saint-Louis-Maillet, campus de l’Université de Moncton. Moncton was named the Centre universitaire de Moncton, campus de l'Université de Moncton.

The current designations since 1994 of the three constituents of the Université de Moncton are: (1) Université de Moncton, campus d'Edmundston (UMCE), (2) Université de Moncton, campus de Moncton (UMCM) and (3) Université de Moncton, campus de Shippagan (UMCS).

== Campuses ==
The university is divided into three campuses:

The Moncton Campus is home to more than 70% of the students and offers all programs, except for some programs that are only available at the Edmundston and Shippagan Campuses. Located in the north of the city, the Moncton Campus includes some twenty pavilions, the CEPS Louis-J.-Robichaud sports center, the J.-Louis-Lévesque arena, the Musée acadien, the Louise-et-Ruben-Cohen Art Gallery, and several residences and apartments to meet the needs of students (rooms, studios, and university apartments).

The Campus Universitaire d'Edmundston, in Edmundston (Edmundston Campus) is built on an elevated area of the downtown core, near the Trans-Canada Highway. It has four pavilions, a student center and a residence. The Pavillon sportif d'Edmundston is located on the campus grounds and includes a swimming pool, a climbing wall, different gymnasiums and more. A 2,400-seat amphitheatre used for field hockey and shows is also located next to the Pavillon sportif. Outside, there is a six-lane athletic field with bleachers.

The Shippagan Campus is located in northeastern New Brunswick. It includes four pavilions: the Irène-Léger Pavilion, the Bibliothèque, Sciences et technologies Pavilion, the Zone côtière Pavilion and the Armand-Caron Sports Pavilion. It also has the Institut de recherche sur les zones côtières VALORĒS, and four university housing buildings. The Shippagan regional pool is attached to the Armand-Caron Sports Pavilion.

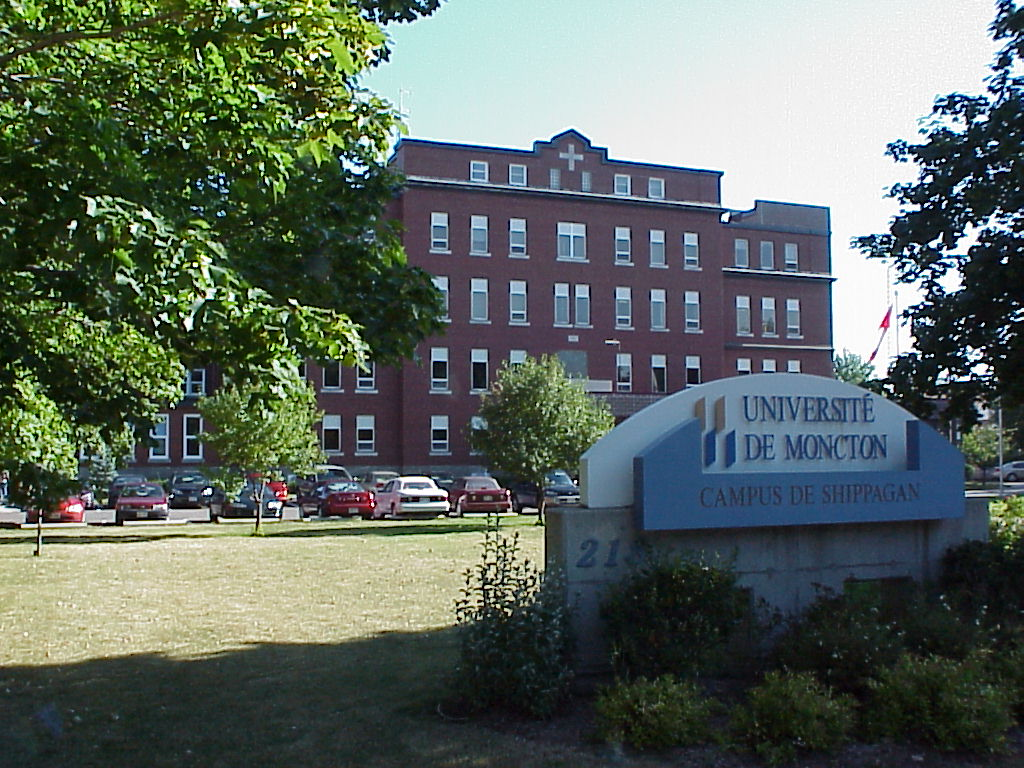
Université de Moncton Shippagan campus

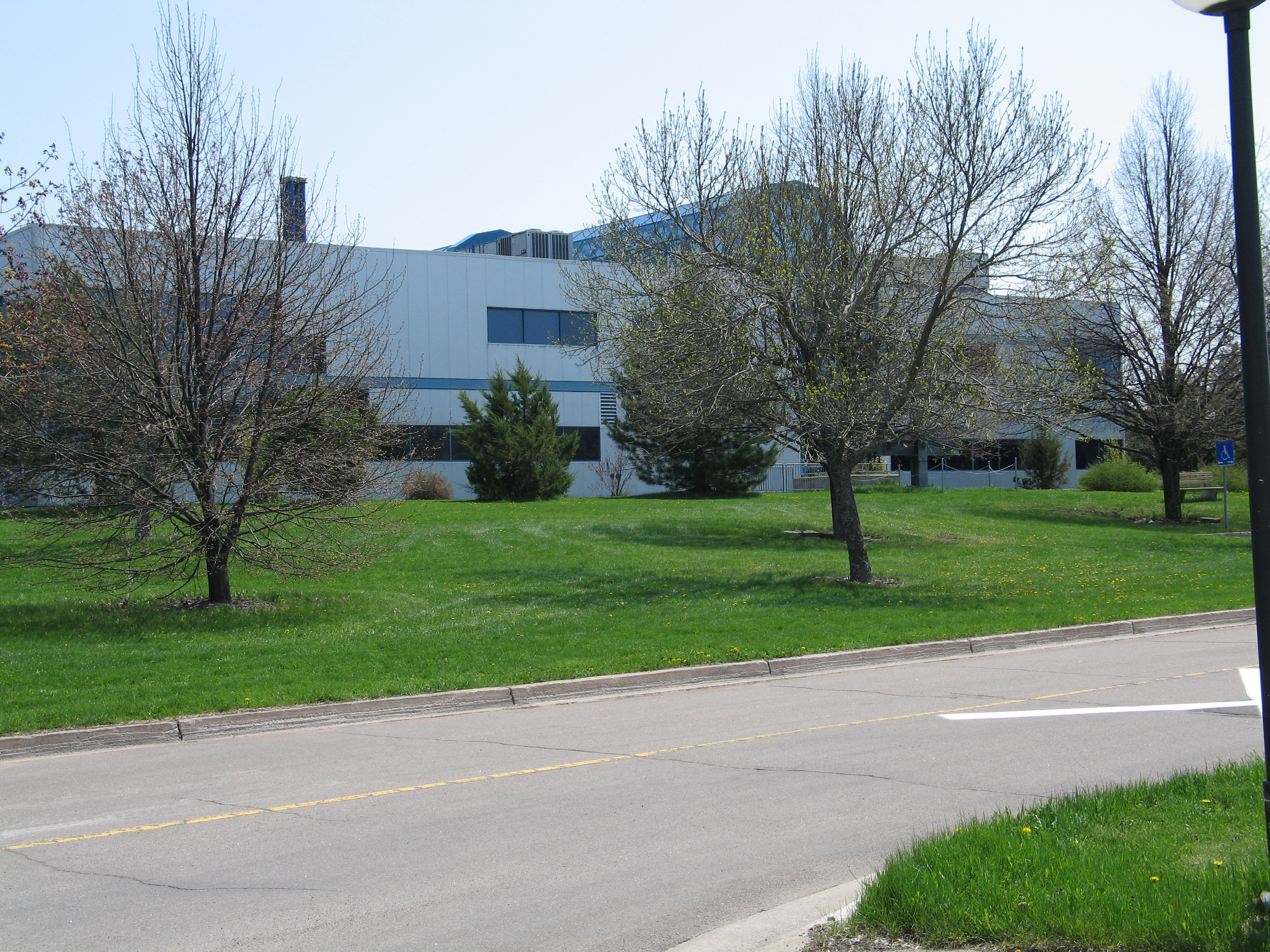
Université de Moncton – Moncton campus

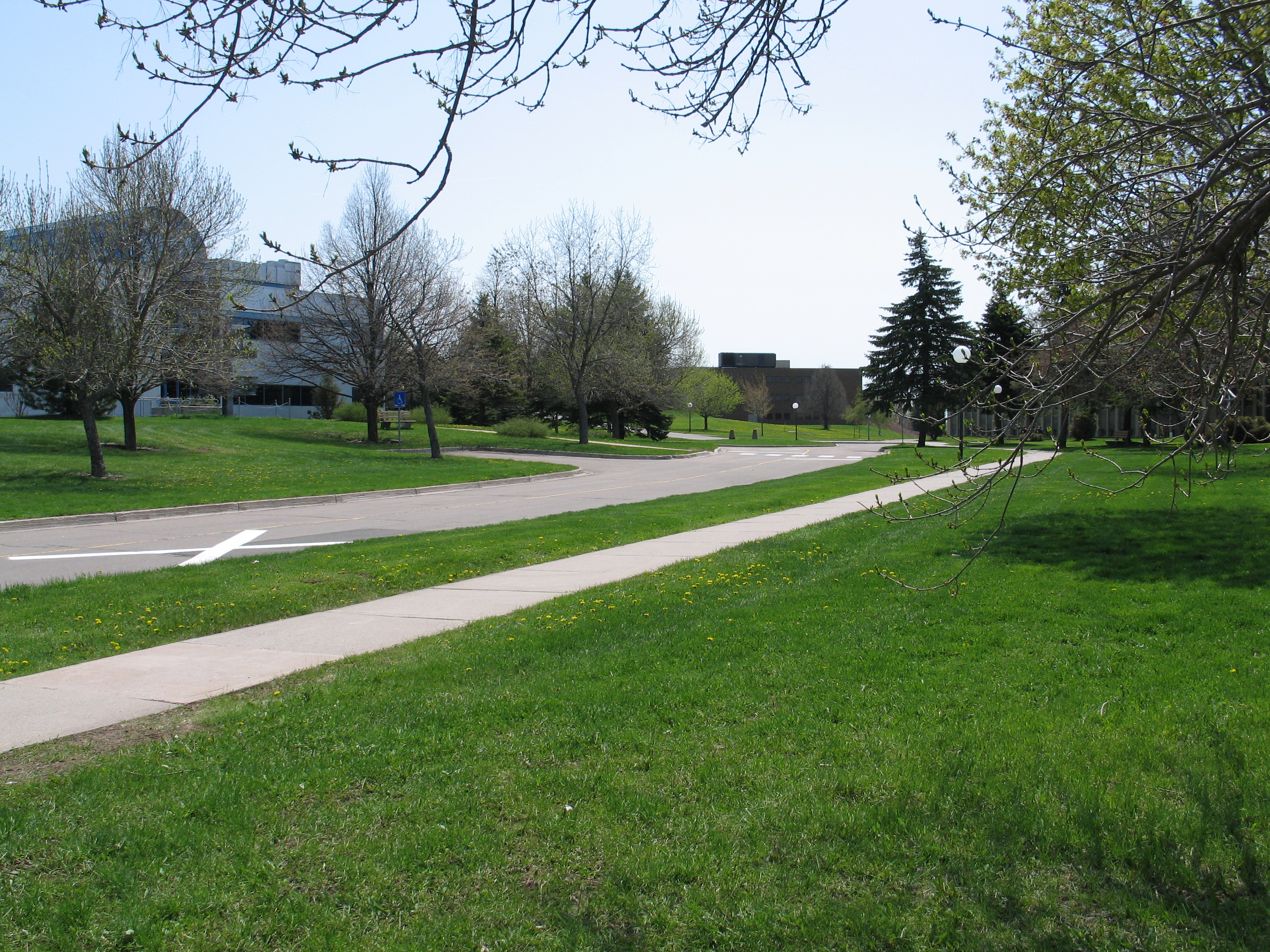
Université de Moncton – Moncton campus

== Faculties ==
The Université de Moncton offers nearly 198 programs:

1. Faculty of Administration (Administration)
2. Faculty of Arts and Social Sciences (Arts et des sciences sociales)
3. Law (Droit)
4. Engineering (Ingénierie)
5. Science (Sciences)
6. Health Sciences and Community Services (Sciences de la santé et des services communautaires)
7. Education (Sciences de l'éducation)
8. Forestry School (École de foresterie)
9. Information Management and Sustainable Development and Coastal Zone (Gestion de l’information et développement durable et zone côtière)

Not all faculties offer programs on each campus. In many cases, students may take the first year of a program at the Edmundston or Shippagan Campuses before having to transfer to the Moncton Campus. The School of Forestry (École de foresterie) offers courses at the Edmundston Campus only, while the Sustainable development and Coastal Zone (Développement durable et zone côtière) and Information Management (Gestion de l'information) are only offered at the Shippagan Campus. The first year of the Nursing program at the Shippagan Campus is followed by three years in Bathurst.

The Université de Moncton offers a range of studies at the graduate certificate, graduate diploma, master's and doctoral levels. The Moncton Campus is also the home of the medical training program run by the Université de Sherbrooke.

== Libraries ==
There are six libraries and resource centres across the three campuses: Bibliothèque Champlain (Moncton), Bibliothèque de droit Michel-Bastarache (Moncton), Centre d'études acadiennes Anselme-Chiasson (Moncton), Centre de ressources pédagogiques (Moncton), Bibliothèque Rhéa-Larose (Edmundston) and Bibliothèque Aldéa-Landry (Shippagan).

Two of these libraries, Bibliothèque de droit Michel-Bastarache and Centre de ressources pédagogiques, are special libraries, catering to the Faculty of Law and the Faculty of Education, respectively. The Centre d'études acadiennes Anselme-Chiasson, found on the lower level of Bibliothèque Champlain, is a primary resource and archive centre for Acadian studies.

== Student life and athletics ==
Many social and physical activities are offered, such as live performances, music, movies, theater, student radio, improvisation, student councils, swimming pool, racquetball and squash courts, gym, fitness rooms and more.

The Université de Moncton is represented by nine teams in various sports leagues in the Atlantic University Sport (AUS) and U Sports (formerly: Canadian Interuniversity Sport (CIS)). They compete under the name Aigles Bleus and Aigles Bleues. The university is represented by men's and women's teams for hockey, soccer, athletics, and cross-country running. It also has a women's volleyball team.

The Croix-Bleue Medavie Stadium, located on the Moncton campus, seats 10,000 to 20,000. It allows the Université de Moncton to host major sporting and recreational events. It was inaugurated in 2010.

Codiac FM is the student radio station on campus, previously CKUM-FM.

== Noted faculty and alumni ==
- Michel Bastarache, Puisne Justice on the Supreme Court of Canada
- Joël Bourgeois, 3000m steeplechase runner, 2-time competitor at the Olympic Games and gold medalist at the 1999 Pan American Games
- Jean Cadieux, doctorat honoris causa in law, rector of Université de Moncton from 1974 to 1979, professor emeritus, member of the Order of Canada.
- Herménégilde Chiasson, professor, poet and playwright, and former Lieutenant Governor of New Brunswick
- Stéphane Dion, professor, academic, Cabinet Minister, and Former Liberal Party Leader
- Kamylle Frenette, paratriathlete
- Brian Gallant, former Premier of New Brunswick
- Corinne Gallant, professor emeritus and feminist who received the Order of Canada
- Alain Haché, Professor of physics, demonstrated superluminal electric pulse propagation
- Roméo LeBlanc, former Governor General of Canada, graduated from Collège St-Joseph
- Diane Lebouthillier, Canadian cabinet minister
- James E. Lockyer, Professor of law
- Bernard Lord, former Premier of New Brunswick, brother of Roger Lord
- Roger Lord, internationally acclaimed concert pianist and Professor of Piano at U de M, brother of Bernard Lord
- Antonine Maillet, Acadian author and winner of the Prix Goncourt
- Hubert Marcoux, French-Canadian solo sailor and author
- Percy Mockler, Canadian senator
- Jean-Guy Poitras, member of the New Brunswick Sports Hall of Fame
- J.C. Marc Richard, Chief Justice of New Brunswick 2018–Present
- Claude Roussel, sculptor, former head of art department
- Donald Savoie, professor of public administration and author
- Linda Silas, president of the Canadian Federation of Nurses Unions
- Anne-Marie Sirois, Canadian visual artist, writer and film director
- Christine St-Pierre, former Radio-Canada reporter and Quebec Minister of Culture, Communications and the Status of Women
- Camille Thériault, former Premier of New Brunswick

== See also ==
- Higher education in New Brunswick
- Atlantic University Sport
- Canadian Interuniversity Sport
- Canadian government scientific research organizations
- Canadian university scientific research organizations
- Canadian industrial research and development organizations
