= Higher education in Canada =

Tertiary education provision in Canada

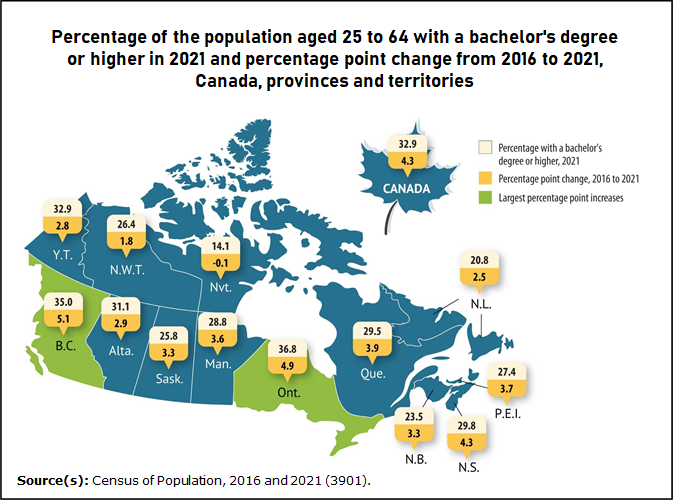
Canada by province and territory, showing the percentage of the population aged 25 to 64 who had a bachelor's degree or higher, and the percentage point change from 2016 to 2021.

Higher education in Canada includes provincial, territorial, Indigenous and military higher education systems. The ideal objective of Canadian higher education is to offer every Canadian the opportunity to acquire the skills and knowledge necessary to realize their utmost potential. It aspires to cultivate a world-class workforce, enhance the employment rate of Canadians, and safeguard Canada's enduring prosperity. Higher education programs are designed with the perspective of the learner in focus, to mitigate risks and assure definite outcomes.

According to a 2022 report by the OECD, Canada is one of the most educated countries in the world; the country ranks first worldwide in the percentage of adults having tertiary education, with over 56 percent of Canadian adults having attained at least an undergraduate college or university degree.

== Higher education systems in Canada ==
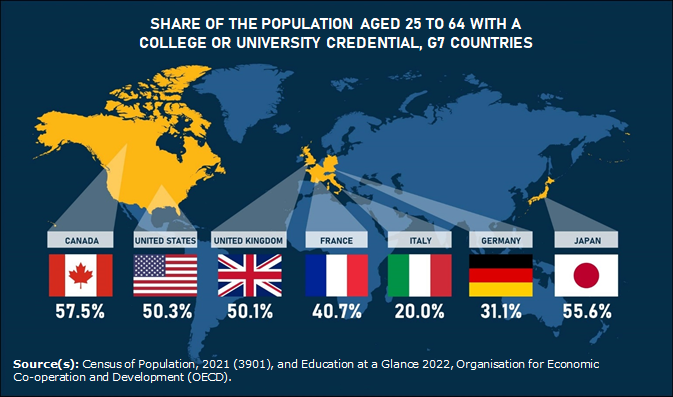
Largest share of college or university graduates in the G7

In Canada, the constitutional responsibility for higher education primarily rests with the provinces of Canada per the Constitution Act, 1867. The jurisdictional issue of the decision was contentious from its inception. As a result of this constitutional arrangement, a distinctive system of education, including higher education, has evolved in each province and territory. The federal government's direct involvement in higher education is currently limited to the Canadian Military Colleges and funding the education of Indigenous peoples.

The higher education systems in Canada's ten provinces include their historical development, organization (e.g., structure, governance, and funding), and goals (e.g., participation, access, and mobility). Each of the three territories in Canada (i.e., Nunavut, Northwest Territories, and Yukon) have separate higher education systems that reflect territorial history, organization, and goals in the context of geographical challenges.

=== Indigenous education ===
Higher education for Indigenous peoples in Canada can be considered on a spectrum ranging from Indigenous to general programs and institutions. At one end, some institutions are specifically intended for Indigenous people, located in predominantly Indigenous communities, controlled by First Nations band governments or dedicated non-profit boards, and/or accredited by Indigenous bodies (often international in scope). At the other end are the mainstream provincial or territorial systems with general intake. In the middle could be considered focused programs chartered by provincial or territorial governments or affiliated to their mainstream institutions. (The spectrum does not consider programs outside Canada, whether Indigenous-focused or not.) The peculiar institutional situation of Indigenous education is the result of a quirk in jurisdictional division between the provinces and federal government as well as a negative relationship between Indigenous people and mainstream education due to the historical legacy of assimilationist policies pursued by Canadian authorities. Many Indigenous programs and institutions are growing much more rapidly than mainstream ones; nonetheless, most have lengthy institutional histories.

An example of an independent Indigenous institution is University nuhelot'įne thaiyots'į nistameyimâkanak Blue Quills, which is not provincially chartered, unlike all other universities in Alberta but instead incorporated by federal statute. The institution was founded as an Indian residential school in the 1930s before being occupied by a protest movement in 1970 and then transferred to Indigenous control in 1971. It was declared a university on September 1, 2015.

An example of an Indigenous institution federated with a larger university is First Nations University of Canada, which is part of the University of Regina.

An example of an Indigenous accreditation body is the Indigenous Advanced Education and Skills Council.

=== Alberta ===
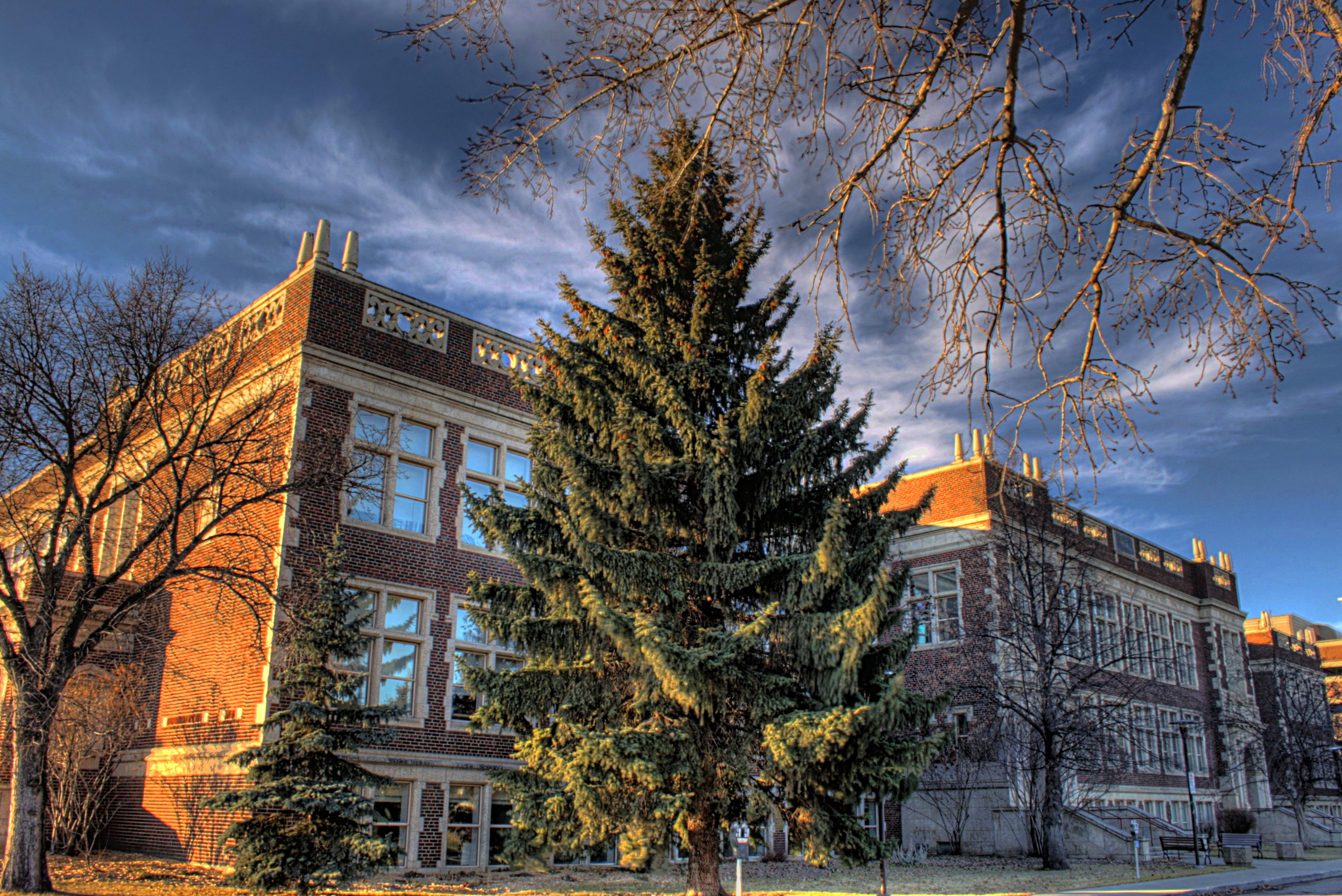
The University of Alberta has the largest number of graduate students enrolled in Alberta.

Higher education in Alberta trains students in various academic and vocational specializations. Generally, youth attend school from kindergarten until grade twelve, at which time they have the option to continue into post secondary study. Students are required to meet the individual entrance requirements for programs offered at the institution of their choice. Once accepted, students are allowed greater educational opportunities through the province extensively developed articulation system. The Alberta Council on Admissions and Transfer (ACAT) enables students transfer between programs at any of the twenty public post secondary institutions, eight private colleges, and other Alberta-based not for profit institutions. To ensure a continued high standard for credentials awarded by post secondary facilities, the Alberta Ministry of Advanced Education established the Campus Alberta Quality Council with membership in the International Network for Quality Assurance Agencies in Higher Education.

Post-secondary education in Alberta is regulated by the Ministry of Advanced Education. There are eight public universities in Alberta, ten public colleges, three polytechnical institutes (which grant degrees), and seven private colleges (all of which grant degrees). Most private universities refer to themselves as "university colleges", and they grant equivalent degrees. One university, University nuhelotʼįne thaiyotsʼį nistameyimâkanak Blue Quills, is governed not under provincial legislation, but controlled directly by a consortium of seven First Nations band governments.

=== British Columbia ===
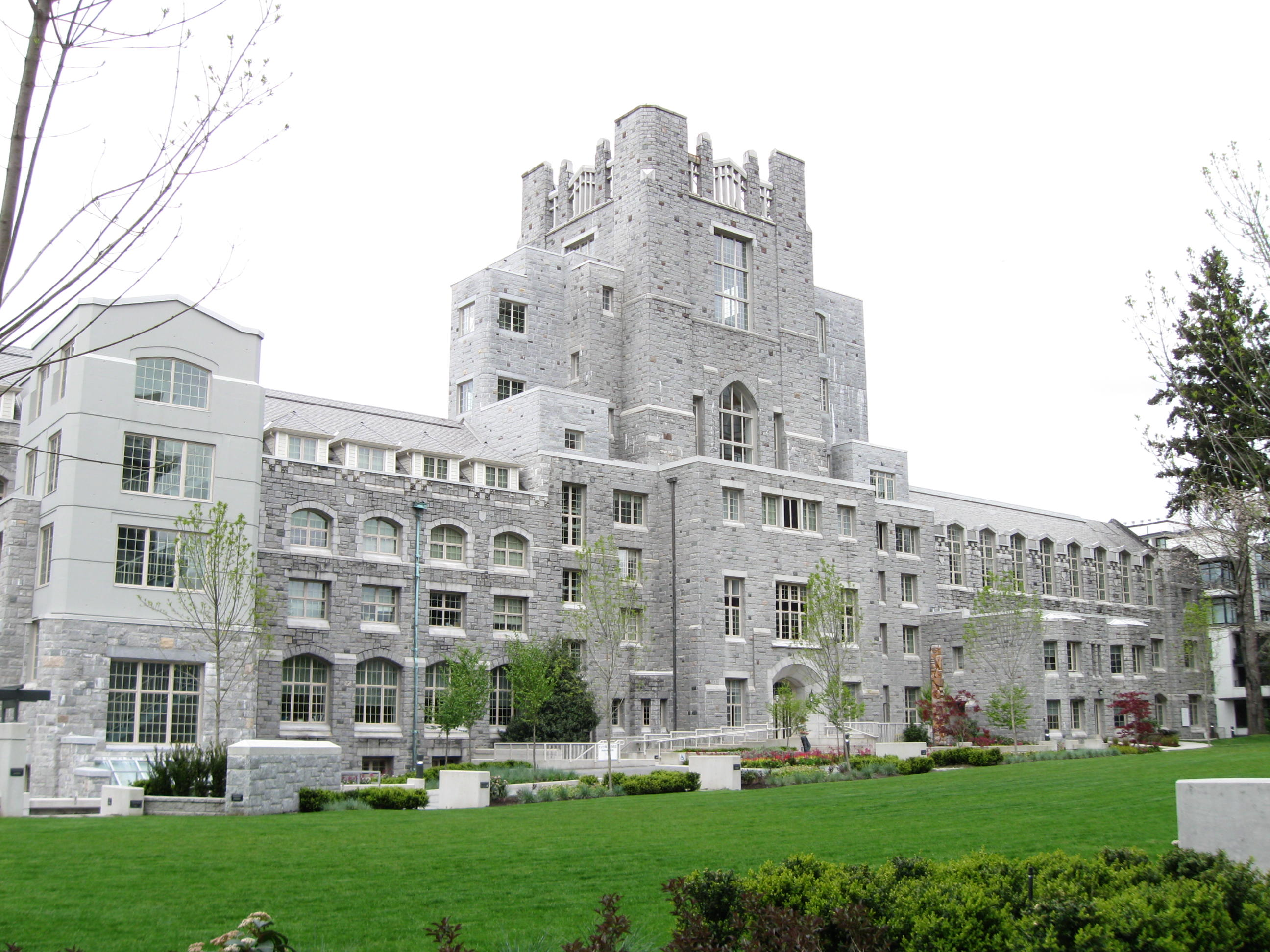
The University of British Columbia has the largest number of students enrolled in western Canada.

The provincial government administers a higher education system that includes twenty-five publicly funded institutions, fourteen private institutions, and numerous private career training institutions or career colleges. Public institutions include eleven universities, eleven colleges, and three institutes.

Much like the other regions in Canada, the educational system in British Columbia remained, for the most part, stagnant from the 1960s through the 1990s. During this period, education was divided into two main groups, the college and institute sector and the university sector. However, only the university sector was able to issue a formal degree. In an effort to match the growth of technology, to expand the economy, and to raise attendance rates, this system was revised in 1991 when the New Democratic Party took over control of the central government. One main revision to the education system was a focus on vocationalism, which allowed education to be centred around industry specific skills rather than a generic curriculum. Since some vocational schools already existed, the New Democratic Party found it most logical to join the existing vocational schools and colleges into singular institutions along with enacting new programs. By 1995 five new universities were created offering a mix of vocational programs and generic degree programs. This not only increased the number of attendance spots therefore making a higher education more accessible, but it also made education more practical and applicable to careers after university. In addition, Vocational schools were also used to retrain current members of the workforce so they could adapt with technological changes and advancements. Now that more students had access to specialized vocational programs they were more adept to enter specific industries and could therefore enlarge economic growth and technological innovation.

Post-secondary education in BC is regulated by the Ministry of Post-Secondary Education and Future Skills. There are eleven public universities and five private universities in British Columbia. University enrolment in British Columbia ranges from Quest University Canada with 700 students to the University of British Columbia with 45,484 students.

The biggest provider of online and distance education in BC is Thompson Rivers University, Open Learning. With over 400 individual courses and more than 57 programs available for completion by distance and online learning, students can take a variety of programs such as adult secondary school completion; certificates and diplomas, including advanced and post-baccalaureate; associate degrees; and bachelor's degrees. Considering distance students, Thompson Rivers University's enrolment is 22,036 (8964 of which is distance).

=== Manitoba ===
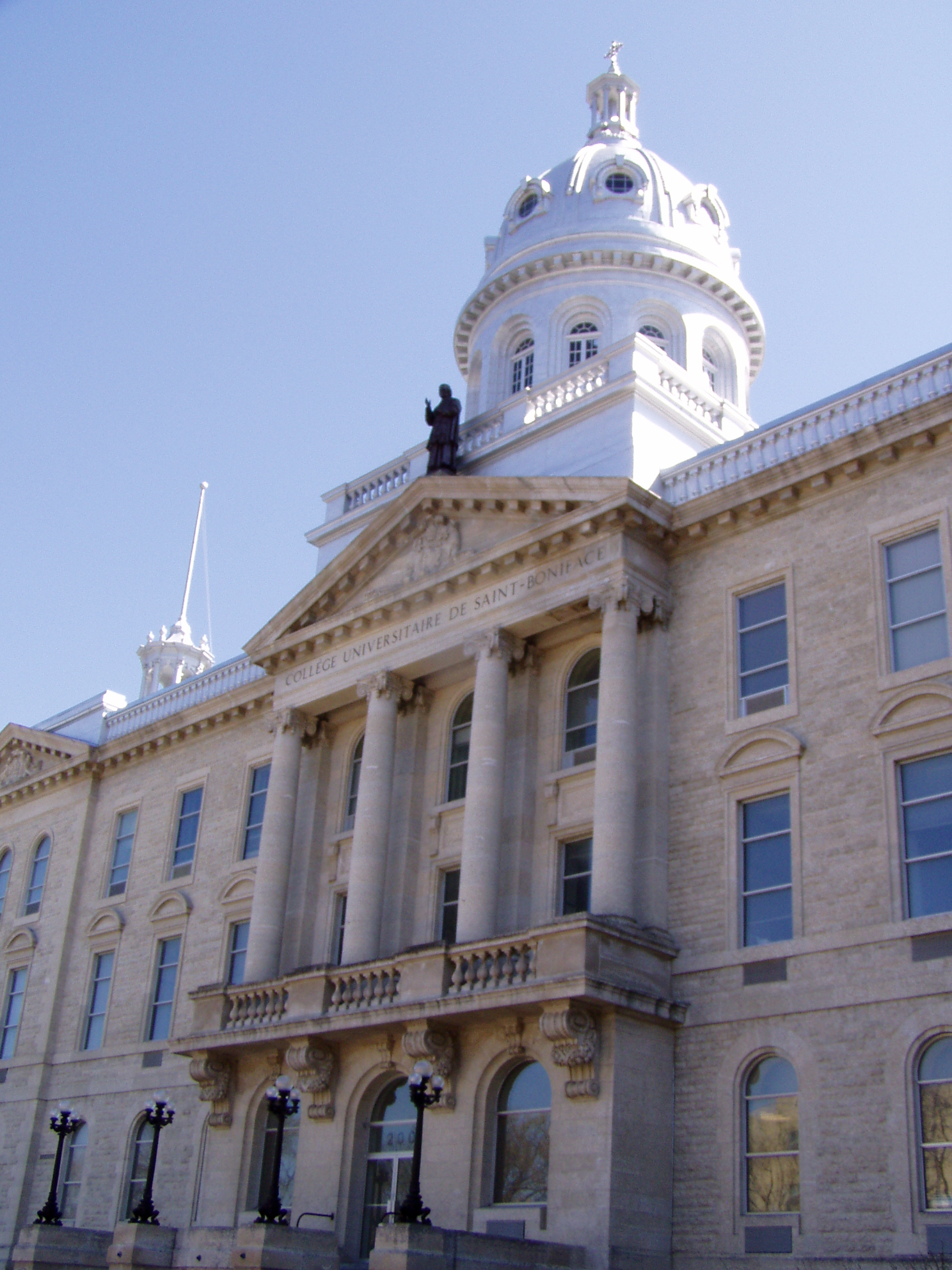
Established in 1818, Université de Saint-Boniface is the oldest post-secondary institute in Manitoba and the only French language university in western Canada.

A major public review of higher education in Manitoba, submitted in 1973 under the title of the Task Force on Postsecondary Education, more commonly known as the Oliver Commission, recommended closer articulation between Manitoba's universities and community colleges. The system remains a binary one, however, with few university transfer programs or college courses which can be applied towards a university degree. The Roblin Commission of 1993 and subsequent declining allocations of the public purse have made it clear that post-secondary institutions will have to find their own private sources of funding to make up shortfalls in general operating budgets.

There are five public universities and one private university in Manitoba, which are under the responsibility of the Ministry of Advanced Education and Literacy. Three of the public universities—the University of Manitoba, which is the oldest university in western Canada, the University of Winnipeg, and Université de Saint-Boniface—are in Winnipeg, the capital and largest city in the province. Université de Saint-Boniface, established in 1818, is the oldest post-secondary institute in the province and is the only French-language university in western Canada. Brandon University is located in the western Manitoba city of Brandon. Canadian Mennonite University is a private Anabaptist university in Winnipeg.

The province also has three university colleges: Booth University College, formed in 1982 in Winnipeg, Providence University College in Otterburne, Manitoba, and the University College of the North, which serves the communities of The Pas and Thompson. Smaller satellite campuses serve 12 other smaller centres, 9 of which are on First Nations land.

University enrolment in Manitoba ranges from Booth University College with several hundred students to the University of Manitoba with 26,800 students.

=== New Brunswick ===
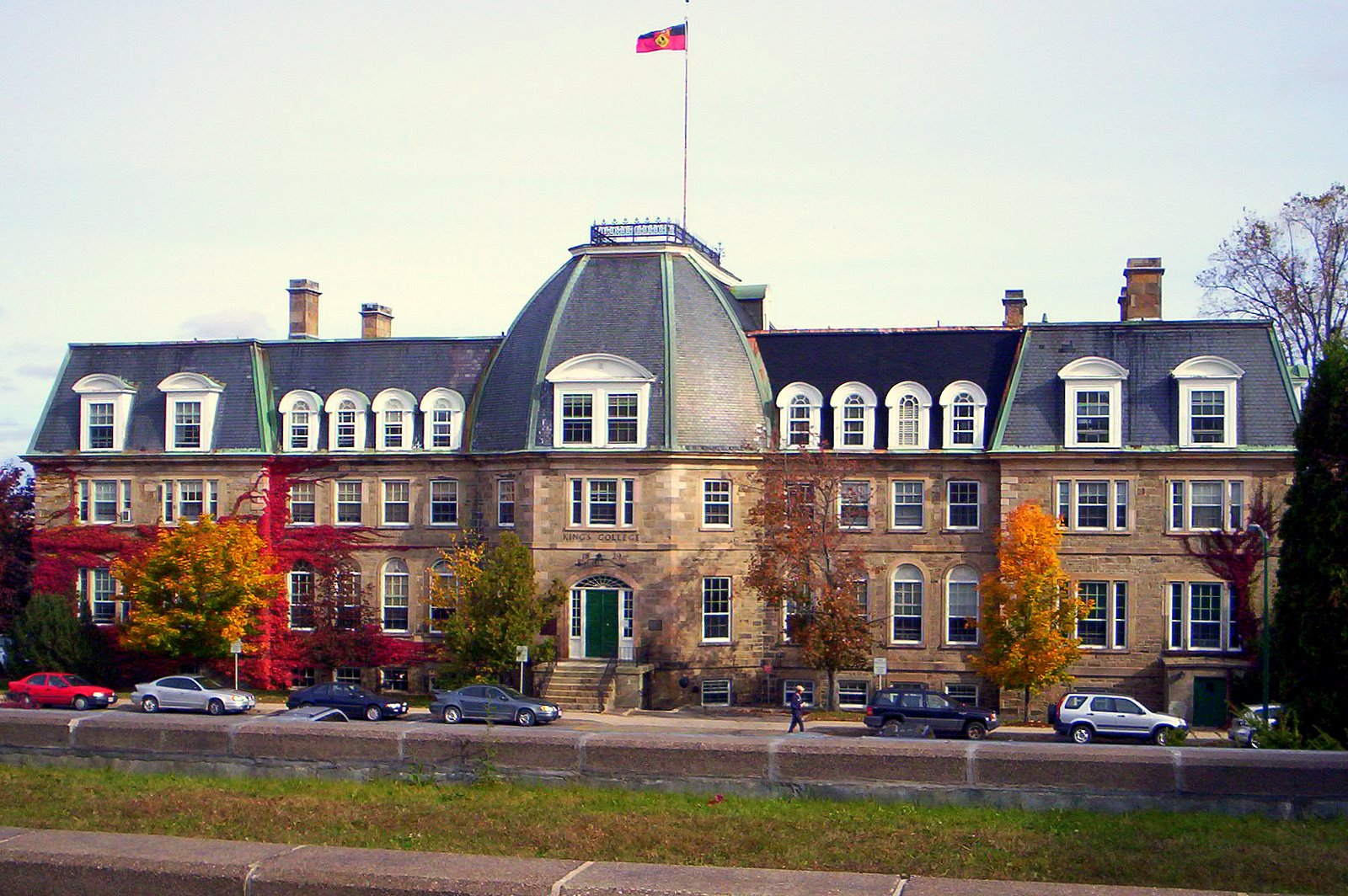
The University of New Brunswick has the largest student enrolment in the province.

The higher education system in New Brunswick includes the governing Ministry of Postsecondary Education Training and Labour, related agencies, boards, or commissions, public or private chartered universities, universities recognized under the degree granting act, public colleges, and other institutions such as private career colleges. Higher education has a rich history in New Brunswick, including the first English-speaking University in Canada, University of New Brunswick, and the first university in the British Empire to have awarded a baccalaureate to a woman (Grace Annie Lockhart, B.Sc., 1875), Mount Allison University. English speaking New Brunswickers in Canada's only bilingual province are falling behind according to Statistics Canada.

There are eight chartered universities in New Brunswick; four public universities, governed by the Ministry of Post-Secondary Education, Training and Labour, and four private institutions including an online university, Yorkville University. New Brunswick holds the distinctions of having the first English-language university in Canada and the first public university in North America, (the University of New Brunswick); and also the first university in the British Empire to award a bachelor's degree to a woman, (Mount Allison University) in 1875. St. Thomas University and University of New Brunswick have campuses in the province's capital of Fredericton and UNB also maintains a campus in Saint John. Established in 1785, the University of New Brunswick is the oldest public in the province, and the Université de Moncton is the newest, formed in 1963, though dating back to 1864 through one of its three predecessor institutions. Public university enrolment ranges from Mount Allison University with 2,486 students to the University of New Brunswick with 10,587 students. Of the three private universities, Crandall University has an enrolment 800. Another private university, St. Stephen's University is located in St. Stephen, NB. Kingswood University is an evangelical Christian University associated with the Wesleyan Church, located in Sussex, New Brunswick, Canada.

=== Newfoundland and Labrador ===
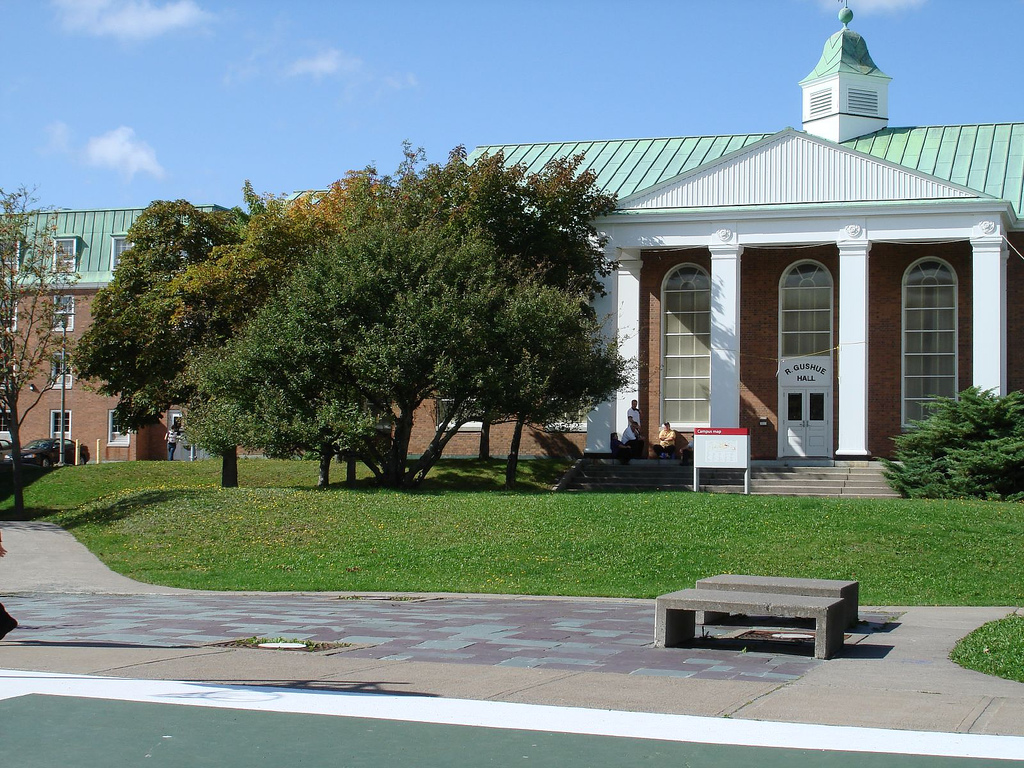
Memorial University of Newfoundland is one of the largest universities in Atlantic Canada.

Newfoundland and Labrador has had the same growing pains as other provinces in developing its own form of education and now boasts a very strong, although relatively small, system. The direction of Newfoundland and Labrador's policy has evolved rapidly since the late 1990s, with increased funding, participation rates, accessibility and transferability. Many of the directives the government has been acting upon in the past 3 years have been a result of recommendations that stemmed from a 2005 white paper: Foundation for Success: White Paper on Public Post-Secondary Education.

The Degree Granting Act of Newfoundland and Labrador regulates degree-granting universities in the province. The only university in Newfoundland and Labrador, Memorial University of Newfoundland, has campuses in three cities, in St. John's, the capital of Newfoundland and Labrador, on the west coast of the province, in Corner Brook, and in Harlow, U.K. With 19,429 enrolled students, it is the second largest university in Atlantic Canada.

=== Northwest Territories ===
The only post-secondary institution in the NWT is Aurora College. The former Arctic College was split into Aurora College and Nunavut Arctic College when Nunavut Territory was created in 1999. Aurora College has campuses in Inuvik, Fort Smith and Yellowknife. It has learning centres in many other communities in the NWT. The territorial Department of Education, Culture and Employment is the government agency responsible for post-secondary education in the Northwest Territories. There are two career colleges located in the NWT: the Academy of Learning in Yellowknife, which provides business information technology courses, and Great Slave Helicopters Flight Training Centre, which supplies Global Positioning System training for helicopter pilot education.

=== Nova Scotia ===
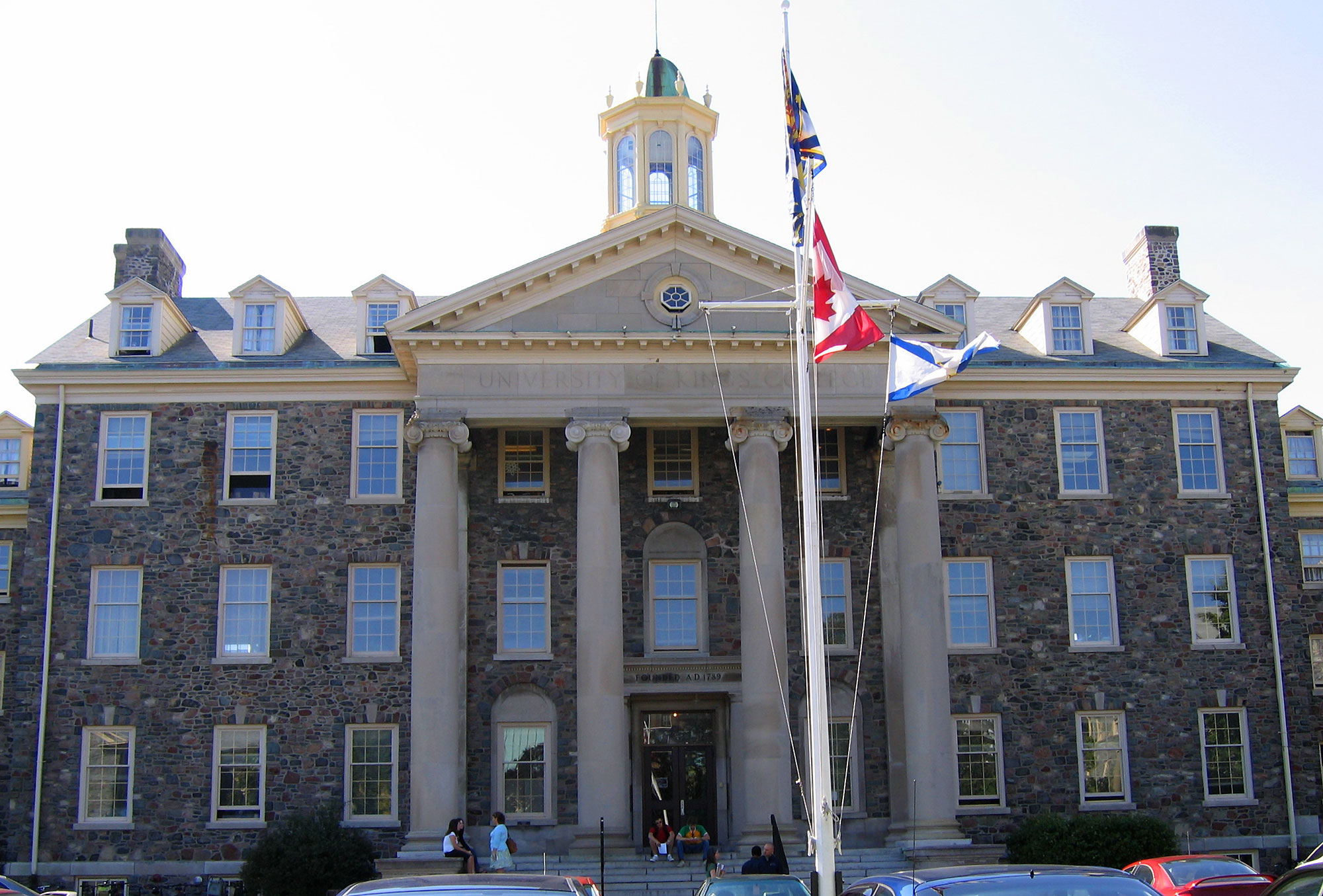
The University of King's College is the oldest university in Nova Scotia.

The governing body for higher education in Nova Scotia is the Department of Education with Karen Casey as Minister of Education. Nova Scotia has a population of less than 1 million people who are served by 11 public universities and one private chartered university authorized to grant degrees, the Nova Scotia Community College that offers programs at 13 campuses, and 6 Community Learning Centres.

There are 10 universities in Nova Scotia. Six of these – Atlantic School of Theology, Dalhousie University, Mount Saint Vincent University, the NSCAD University, Saint Mary's University, and the University of King's College – are located in Halifax, Nova Scotia, the provincial capital and largest city in Atlantic Canada. The oldest university in the province is the University of King's College, established in 1789, while the newest is Cape Breton University, established in 1974. University student enrolment in Nova Scotia ranges from 150 students at Atlantic School of Theology to more than 18,000 at Dalhousie University.

Several universities in Nova Scotia have religious connections. The University of King's College, founded in Windsor, was the first college to obtain university powers in British North America, at a time when Upper Canada had no government of its own. It has always remained under the control of the Church of England. Dalhousie University, originally known as Dalhousie College, was established in Halifax in 1818 with the help of the Presbyterian Church, and Acadia University was founded by Baptists. Catholics formed Saint Mary's University, Mount Saint Vincent University, and Saint Francis Xavier University.

Université Sainte-Anne, the tenth university, is located in Pointe-de-l'Église and instructs its academic courses in French.

=== Nunavut ===
Created in 1999, the Territory of Nunavut is located in the Canadian Arctic. Nunavut has developed some creative solutions to the delivery of post-secondary education considering challenges that include a huge geographic region, a sparse and isolated populace, and four official languages. To address these challenges, Nunavut Arctic College delivers customized learning programs via Community Learning Centres in twenty-four of the twenty-six communities in Nunavut. Programs are developed to address the needs of individual communities, with respect to literacy, adult education, certificates, and professional development for major regional community stakeholders, such as government, employers and non-profit organizations. To assist Northern residents in accessing highly skilled training, Nunavut Arctic College has partnered with McGill University, the University of Victoria and Dalhousie University to offer bachelor's degrees in Education, Nursing and Law, respectively. Nunavut Arctic College is an active member of the Alberta Council on Admissions and Transfer, and has developed formal transfer arrangements with many institutions in the Province of Alberta and Aurora College in the Northwest Territories.

=== Ontario ===
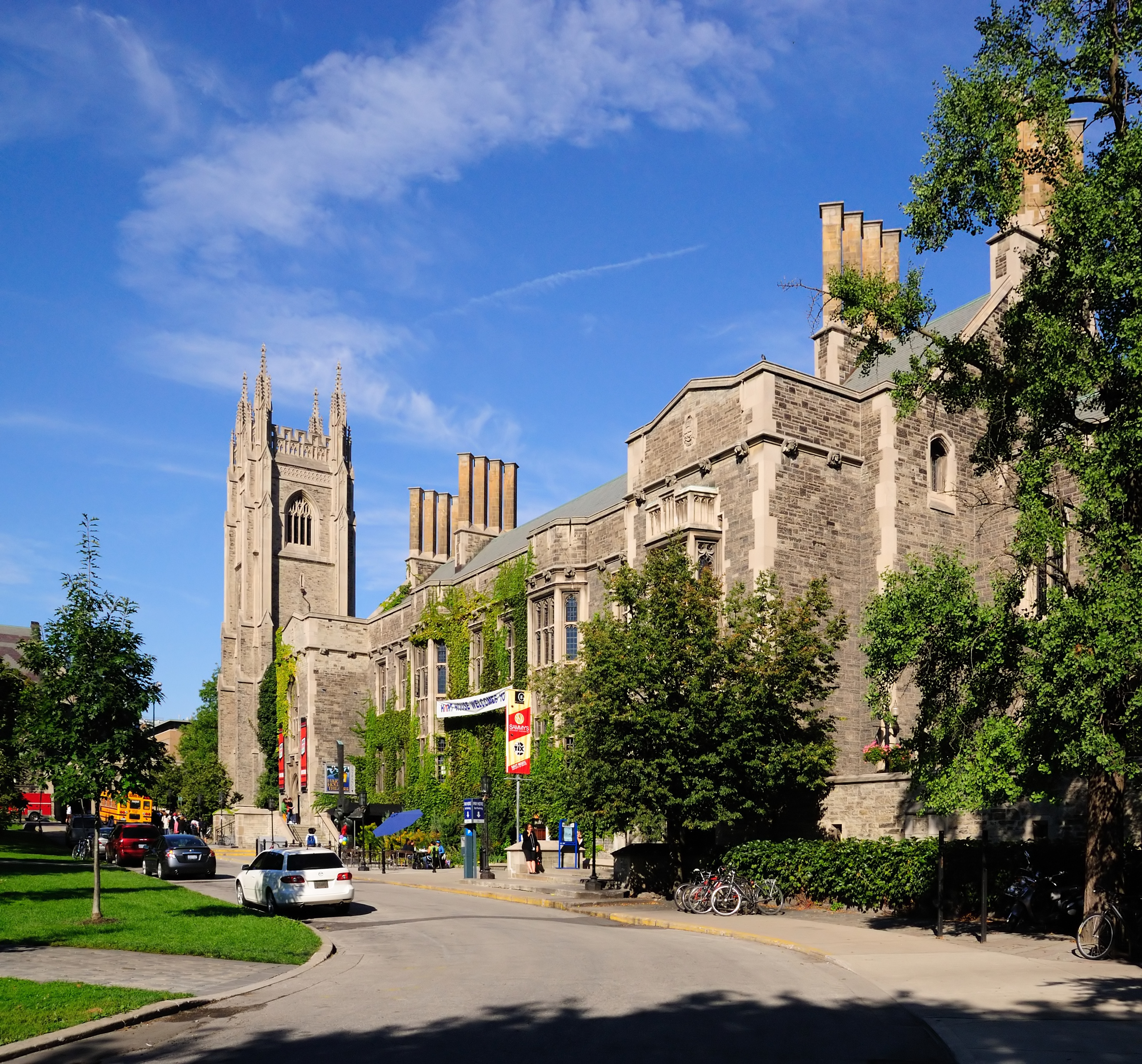
The University of Toronto has the largest student population of any university in Canada.

The higher education system in Ontario includes the governing Ministry of Training, Colleges, and Universities, advisory bodies, public universities, private degree-granting institutions, public colleges, private career colleges, and associations. In Ontario there are twenty-two public universities, twenty-four public colleges, and seventeen privately funded institutions with degree granting authority. Governance within Ontario universities generally follows a bicameral approach with separation of authority between a board and a senate. There are eight associations that provide representation for faculty, staff, institutions, and students within the Ontario higher education system. The public funding of higher education in Ontario primarily relies on cooperation between the government of Canada and the government of Ontario. Public funding of higher education involves direct public funding of institutions for instruction, investment, and research combined with funding of students.

There are 24 publicly funded universities in the Canadian province of Ontario that are post-secondary education institutions with degree-granting authority. Each of these institutions were either established through an Act of the Legislative Assembly or through a royal charter. With the exception of Royal Military College of Canada, students apply to public universities in Ontario through the Ontario Universities' Application Centre.

Ontario also has 24 publicly funded colleges, most referred to as Colleges of Applied Arts and Technology and three as Institutes of Technology and Advanced Learning, all of which are commonly referred to as colleges. All of the colleges offered 901 bachelor's degree programmes, as of 2023–24.

The University of Toronto was established in 1827, making it the oldest university in Ontario. The newest university in Ontario is the Université de l'Ontario français, incorporated by legislation in 2018 but accepting its first cohort of full-time students in 2021. The next newest, Algoma University, was established in 2008 after gaining independence from Laurentian University. The largest university in terms of enrolment is the University of Toronto, which has 84,000 students across campuses in three locations. York University in Toronto has over 50,000 students, the second largest university in terms of enrolment. The U15 Group of Canadian Research Universities is headquartered in Ottawa.

Toronto Metropolitan University (TMU) is one of Ontario's largest comprehensive universities and an example of an urban university model, with its main campus integrated into downtown Toronto near Sankofa Square rather than a traditional self-contained campus. The university offers more than 125 programs across multiple faculties and schools, and had an enrolment of over 47,000 students in the 2024–25 academic year. TMU has also gained recognition in national and international rankings, including placement in the Times Higher Education World University Rankings and Maclean's comprehensive university rankings.

=== Prince Edward Island ===
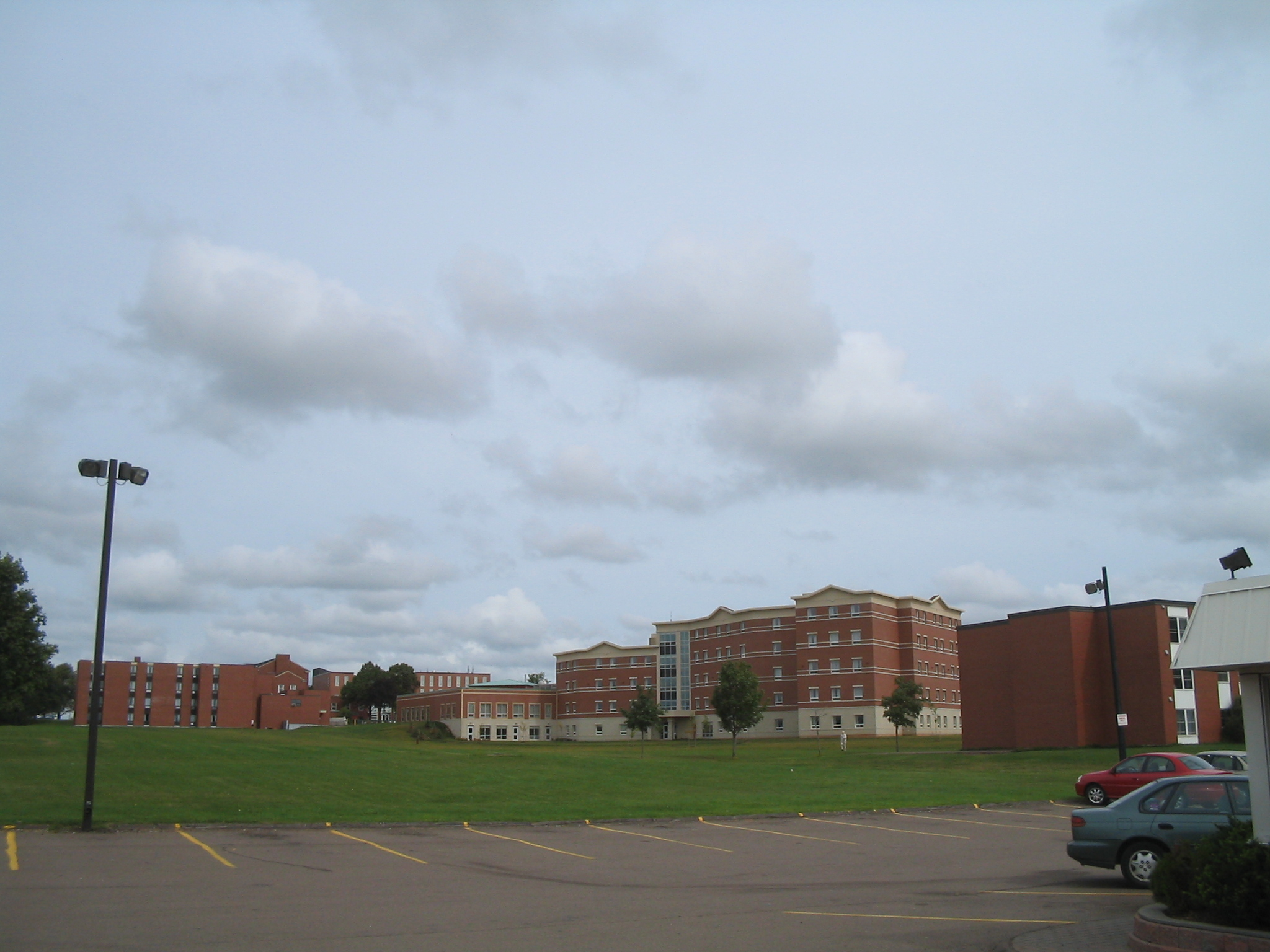
The University of Prince Edward Island in 2006.

Higher education in Prince Edward Island falls under the jurisdiction of the Higher Education and Corporate Services Branch within the Department of Education and Early Childhood Development. The province has one university, the University of Prince Edward Island authorized to grant degrees and one community college, Holland College, that operates centres across the province including: the Culinary Institute of Canada, the Justice Institute of Canada, the Marine Centre, the Aerospace Centre, the Atlantic Tourism and Hospitality Institute and the Prince Edward Island Institute of Adult and Community Education.

There is one university in Prince Edward Island that is authorized to grant degrees. Higher education in the province falls under the jurisdiction of the Higher Education and Corporate Services Branch within the Department of Education and Early Childhood Development. The only university in the province, the University of Prince Edward Island, is in the province's capital of Charlottetown. The institution resulted from an amalgamation of Prince of Wales College, a former university college founded in 1834, and Saint Dunstan's University, founded in 1855. UPEI hosts the Atlantic Veterinary College, funded by the four Atlantic provincial governments.

=== Quebec ===
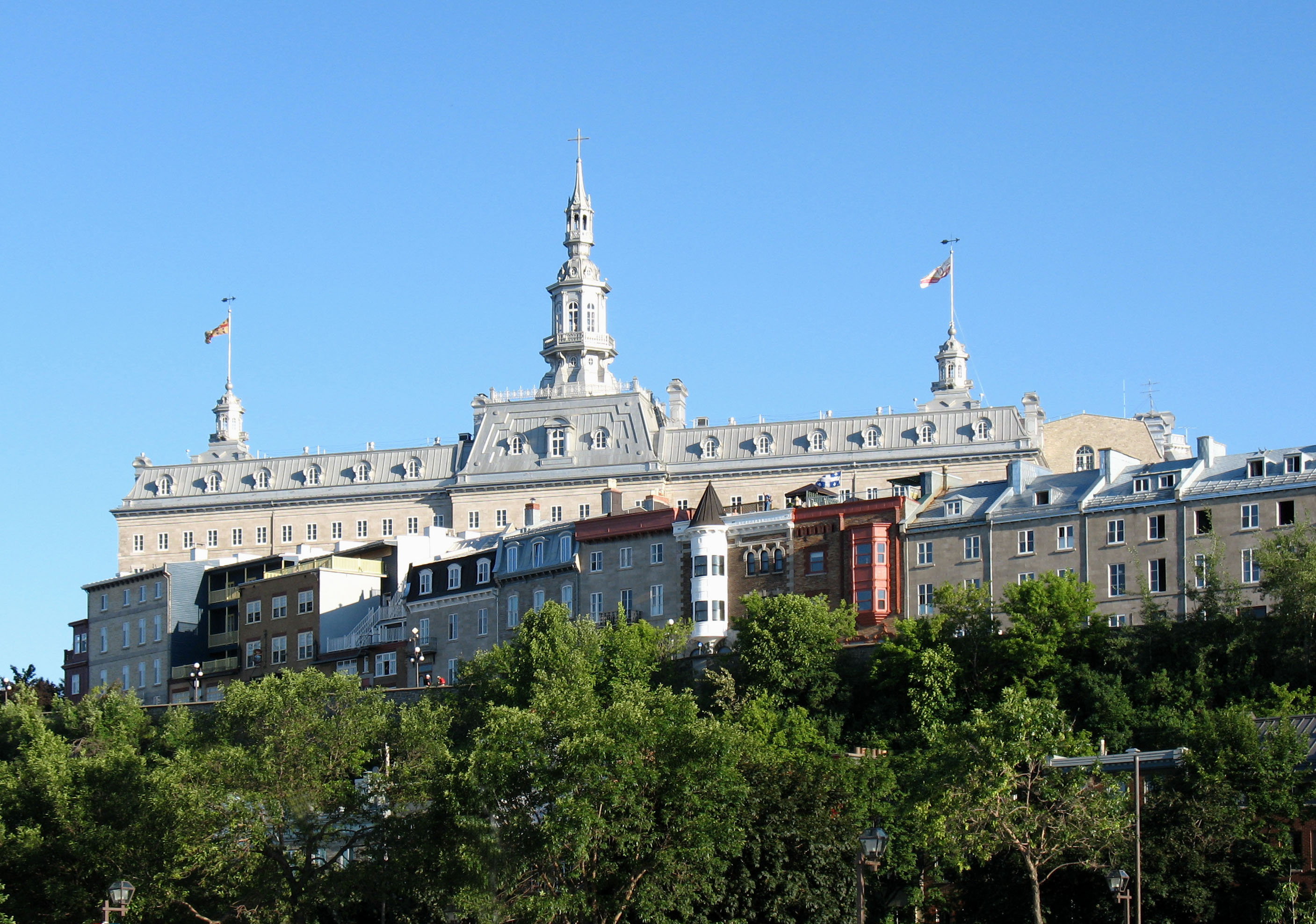
Established in 1663, Université Laval is the oldest post-secondary institution in Canada.

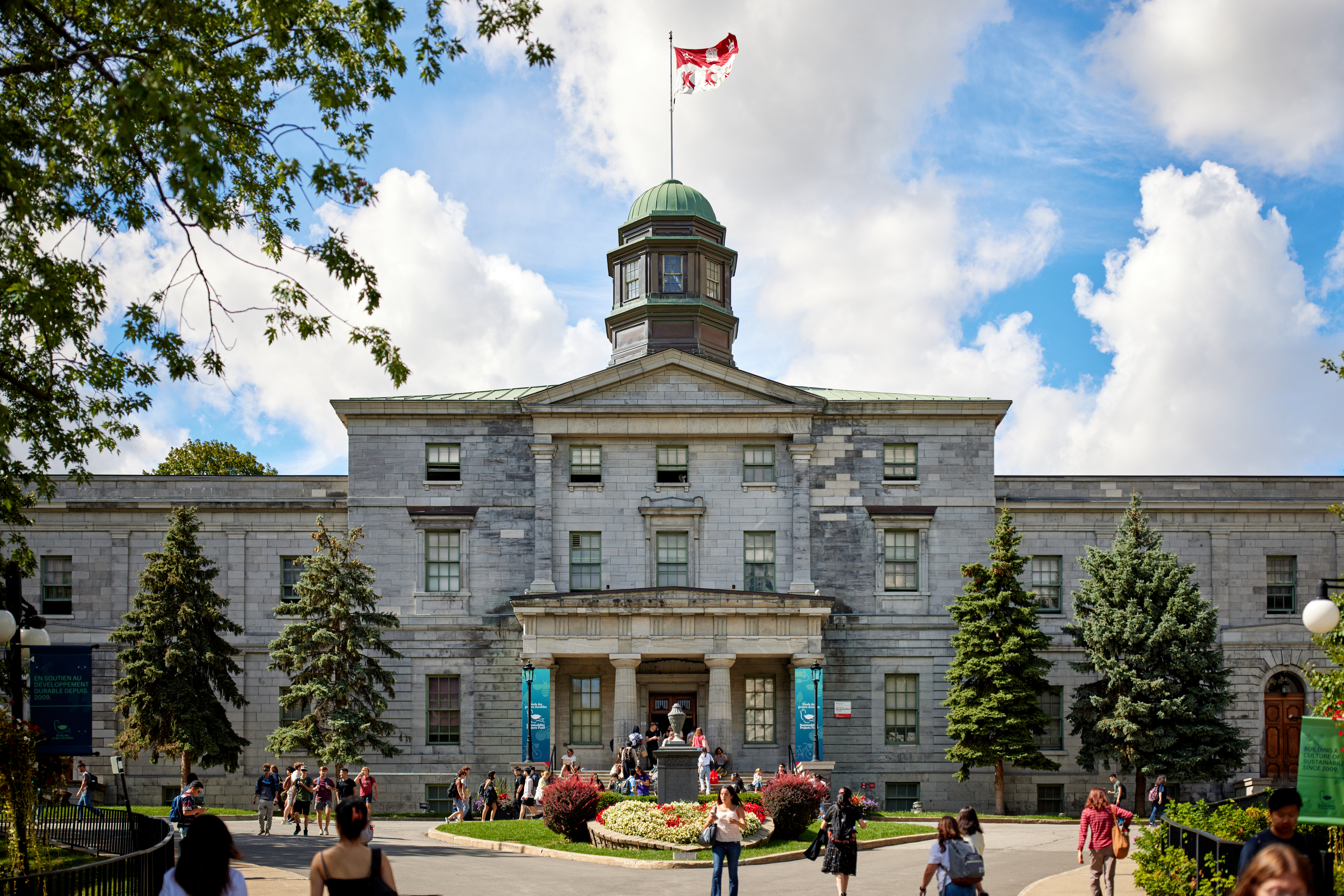
McGill University is the oldest anglophone university in the province of Quebec.

The higher education system in Quebec is unique when compared to the other Canadian provinces and territories. Students complete their secondary studies in their 5th year, which is the equivalent of grade 11. Post-secondary studies start within a mandatory pre-university college system. A publicly funded college is called Collège d'enseignement général et professionnel (CEGEP). Private colleges exist but in much fewer numbers. In college, students keen on academic or highly skilled professions would take the university preparation program, while students interested in a skilled trade would take specialized programs at this level to prepare them for the workforce. Because College includes two years of academic study they essentially eliminate the freshman year of university. Programs in Quebec universities are more specialized, but students are required to complete only ninety credits for a Bachelors degree. Students from outside the province are required make up the first year either through a college, CEGEP, or at their chosen university. Although French is the official language at the provincial level, all students can access post-secondary education in both French and English.

There are 19 universities in the largely French-speaking province of Quebec, 10 of which form the Université du Québec network.

In Québec, universities are independent from government and autonomous in managing their affairs. By means of legislation or constitutional charters, lawmakers have granted each university the freedom to define its own curriculum and develop its own teaching and research programs. The university has full responsibility for setting admission standards and enrolment requirements, awarding degrees and recruiting its personnel.

Of the nineteen universities, three are anglophone: Concordia University, McGill University and Bishop's University. One, the Royal Military College Saint-Jean, is bilingual (between French and English). The rest are francophone: five of them – École de technologie supérieure, Polytechnique Montréal, HEC Montréal, Université de Montréal and Université du Québec à Montréal – are located in Montreal, the most populated city in Quebec, and four of them – École nationale d'administration publique, Institut national de la recherche scientifique, TÉLUQ and Université Laval – are based in Quebec City, the province's capital. The Institut national de la recherche scientifique and École nationale d'administration publique do not offer undergraduate level programs, while TÉLUQ is a distance learning university.

The oldest university in the province is Université Laval, established in 1663 but became a university only in 1852. The most recent institutions are: Université du Québec en Abitibi-Témiscamingue (1983), Concordia University (1974), École de technologie supérieure (1974), TÉLUQ (1972, merged with UQÀM in 2005, split in 2012). University enrolment in the province of Quebec ranges from the Institut national de la recherche scientifique with 480 students to the Université de Montréal with 55,540 students (but this figure actually includes HEC and Polytechnique, which are legally distinct universities).

=== Saskatchewan ===
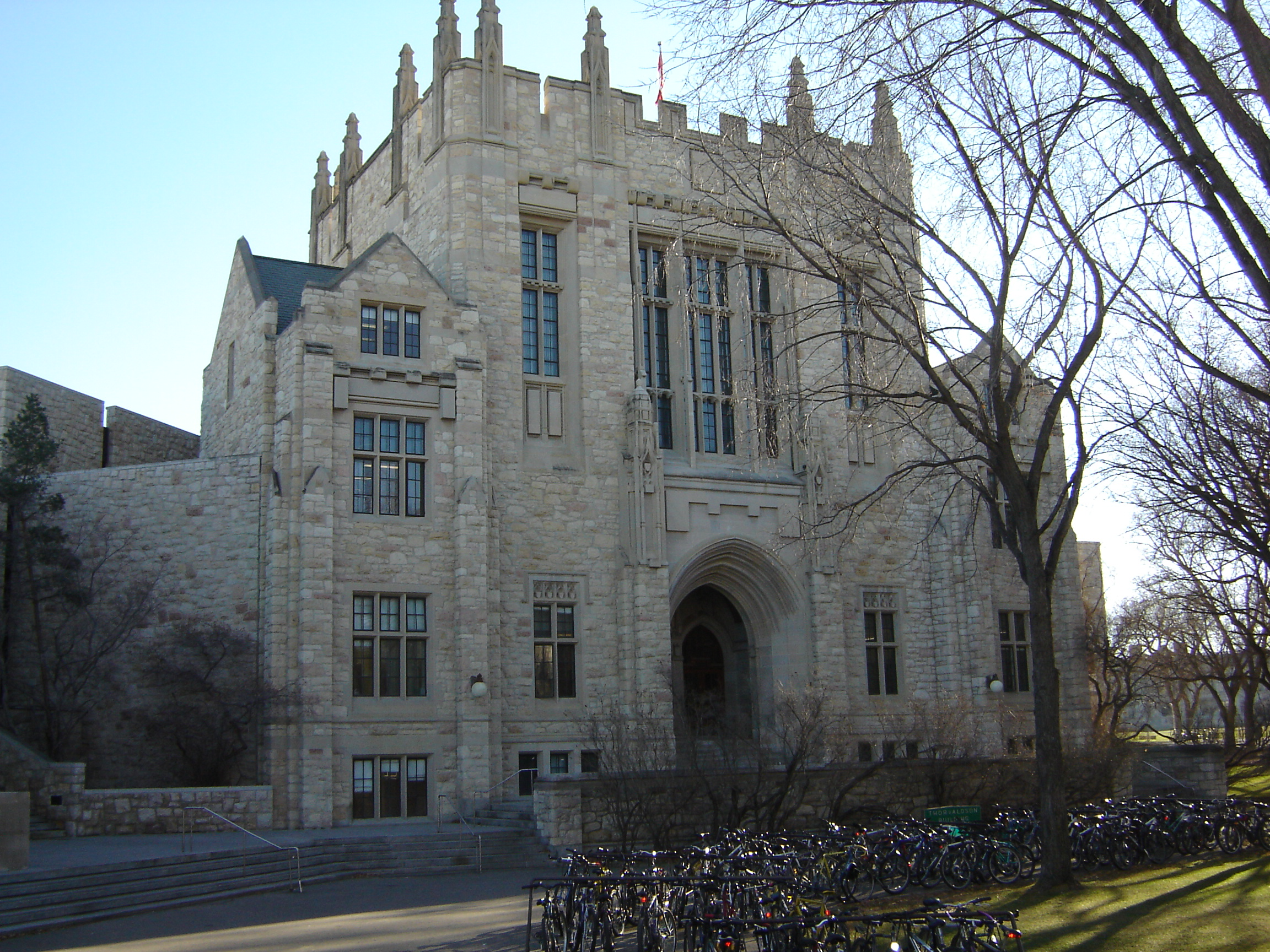
The University of Saskatchewan holds the highest enrolment numbers out of any university in the province.

The post-secondary sector includes two public universities, Indigenous-controlled institutions that are affiliated to either one of the public universities, 1 polytechnic, four federated colleges, career colleges, eight regional colleges, and Campus Saskatchewan govern by the Ministry of Advanced Education, part of the provincial government of Saskatchewan. Campus Saskatchewan, established in 2002 as a partnership with various post-secondary institutions to work together to use technology-enhanced learning to increase opportunities for the people in Saskatchewan to access high quality education and training at times and in places that best meet their needs. According to the 2014–15 budget report, The Ministry of Advanced Education received $817.8 million, an increase of $24 million or 3.7 per cent over last year to support operational increases and several key investments at post-secondary institutions. Employment and Labour oversees a number of to assist current and potential students such as the Graduate Retention Program (GRP). In addition, the ministry also offers non-payable funding through scholarships, grants and bursaries to eligible students. The Saskatchewan Institute of Applied Sciences and Technology (SIAST) received authorization to its first degree, a Bachelor of Psychiatric Nursing, the first of its kind in the province in July 2013. The following year on November, SIAST was renamed Saskatchewan Polytechnic (SaskPolyTech).

There are two universities in Saskatchewan with degree-granting authority. The Government of Saskatchewan must establish statutes individually to degree-granting universities; these statutes outline the authority of each institution, their regulations, and bylaws. The University of Regina is based Regina, the province's capital, and the University of Saskatchewan is in Saskatoon, the most populous city in Saskatchewan. The University of Saskatchewan is the oldest university in the province, founded in 1907. The University of Saskatchewan is also the largest university in Saskatchewan with 18,620 students, and the First Nations University of Canada (FNUC) is the smallest with 840 students. The First Nations University of Canada is another post-secondary institution that is federated with the University of Regina, and caters to the needs of First Nations students. It was originally called the Federation of Saskatchewan Indian Nations, and once formed, it entered into a federated agreement with the University of Regina to create the Saskatchewan Indian Federated College (SIFC). This Agreement allowed FNUC to become an independently administered university-college that served First Nations students. The First Nations University of Canada is the only university in the province that does not offer graduate-level programs.

=== Yukon ===
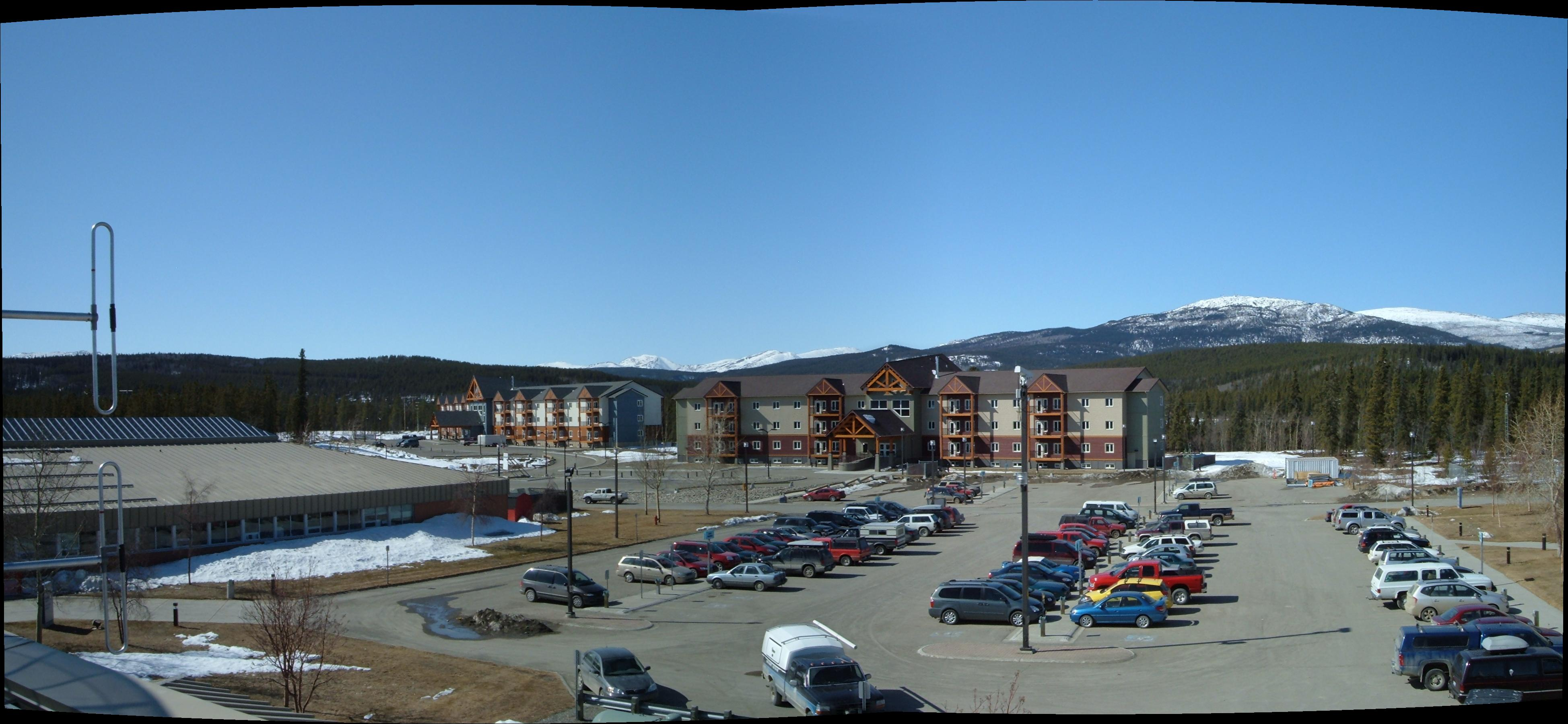
Panorama of Yukon University in 2007. Buildings in the foreground are residences built for the Canada Winter Games as an athlete's village.

Yukon's system of Higher education is shaped by the territory's small population (30,375 people as of May 2006) in a relatively large geographic area. The history of higher education in fact went hand in hand with the establishment of a representative territorial government in 1979. The only post-secondary institute in Yukon, Yukon University, issues certificate, diploma, and degree programs to all high school leavers and older adults. It is the only university in northern Canada, and was previously Yukon College until 19 May 2020 when it became a university. The university provides Adult Basic Education/literacy programs as well.

Yukon University (formerly Yukon College) is a public university in Yukon. Although the institution also operates 12 campuses throughout the territory, its main campus is based in Whitehorse. Initially built as a Canadian college, Yukoners had proposed the Yukon college become a university in some form or other since 2004. In December, 2019, the Yukon Legislative Assembly passed a bill that would transform Yukon College into Yukon University. The university officially opened in May 2020, making Yukon University the only public university in northern Canada.

== Higher education associations and organizations ==
There are numerous groups that are relevant to the structure of higher education in Canada. These include those that support teachers, staff, students, institutions, research, and related groups involved in the delivery of higher education in the Canadian provinces and territories.

== Accreditation ==
Canada does not have an accreditation system to assess the quality of post-secondary schools, such as the United States' network of national and regional accreditation organizations. Membership in Universities Canada and government charters or legislation are substitutes but provinces/territories usually do not evaluate universities as rigorously as American accreditation organizations, and graduates of institutions that are not Universities Canada members sometimes find that universities in other provinces do not recognize their degrees.

Each Canadian university is autonomous in academic matters including policies and procedures of quality assurance of its programs, instructors and procedures. Membership in Universities Canada and the university's government charter are seen as serving in lieu of institutional accreditation, both in Canada and abroad. Eight Canadian provinces have established bodies to provide a second level of quality assurance at universities. Saskatchewan, Newfoundland and Labrador, and Yukon do not have provincial/territorial quality assurance agencies.

There are several unofficial rankings published on an annual basis by media such as Maclean's. Several other magazines like Times Magazine also regularly publish rankings.

Athabasca University in 2006 became one of the first Canadian universities to receive American accreditation, when the Middle States Commission on Higher Education approved its application. After the Simon Fraser Clan became the first non-American team to join the American National Collegiate Athletic Association—which requires regional accreditation—Simon Fraser University applied to the Northwest Commission on Colleges and Universities (NWCCU) in 2008 and was granted accredited status effective as of 2015. According to Simon Fraser, the university has accreditation with NWCCU because Canada does not have a comparable system. US accreditation will, the university stated, "simplify our relationships with US institutions, including government, foundations and collegiate sports associations", and "enhance the value of an SFU degree for alumni abroad and for international students returning home". Non-Universities Canada member Capilano University had NWCCU accreditation from 2013 to 2023. Thompson Rivers University (TRU) in 2013 announced its intention to apply, receiving accreditation from NWCCU in 2018. TRU is also a Universities Canada member.

== Higher education journals and publications ==
There are a number of journals and publications regarding higher education in Canada. The majority are published by associations of faculty, staff, or students.

- Academic Matters is a Canadian magazine which publishes articles on issues of relevance to post-secondary education in Canada and internationally, as well as literature and film reviews, original fiction, research notes and commentaries. This journal is published by the Ontario Confederation of University Faculty Associations and has a circulation of 24,000 readers, including professors, academic librarians and others interested in higher education issues across Canada.
- The Academica Top Ten is a daily Canadian newsletter that curates news items and editorials, events, career opportunities, and services that are most pertinent to Canadian post-secondary education. It has a circulation of nearly 30,000 readers.
- CAUT Bulletin is an electronic newsletter published by the Canadian Association of University Teachers (CAUT).
- The Canadian Journal of Higher Education is a journal published by the Canadian Society for the Study of Higher Education (CSSHE).
- Canadian Public Policy is a journal that examines Canadian economic and social policy published by the Canadian Economics Association.
- is a magazine published by Colleges & Institutes Canada (CICan), formerly known as Association of Canadian Community Colleges (ACCC).
- University Affairs is a magazine published by the Association of Universities and Colleges of Canada (AUCC).

== Selected issues ==
=== Political views ===
A 2011 study found that Canadian university professors were left leaning but were not "hugely different in this respect from the Canadian university-educated population." There was considerable variation in political views, which suggests "that contemporary characterizations of the North American professoriate as left- or right-leaning tend to be overdrawn". Disadvantaged status and socialization in the field were important in forming these views but self-selection effects were not excluded.

=== Value of higher education ===
Canada ranks first among OECD nations in the number of college and university graduates. In 2016, Statistics Canada found that 54.0% of Canadians (aged 25–64) were college or university graduates. However, a 2016 labour market assessment by the Parliamentary Budget Officer reported that the underemployment rate for university undergraduates under the age of 35 worsened from 1991 to 2015. The equivalent rate for college graduates was similar until 2006. Since then it has fallen. Canada does not prioritize or incentivize academic institutions to create streamlined, job-ready programs, nor does it encourage Canadians to pursue such programs that directly address job market needs, as other countries do. For instance, Australians are incentivized to pursue job-ready programs over arts or generalist degrees. This lack of focus has exacerbated the rising rates of unemployment and underemployment. In 2023, a concerning trend emerged in the Canadian economy, commonly referred to as "credential inflation." This phenomenon refers to the increasing educational requirements for even basic job positions, with many of these credentials not necessarily aligning with the actual skills needed for the roles or significantly enhancing job performance. Instead, they often serve as barriers that deter young individuals from pursuing well-paying and stable career opportunities where they could excel. Consequently, young Canadian workers encounter difficulties in navigating economic shocks, layoffs, or industry changes after dedicating their prime working years to classrooms to avoid such misfortune.

Beyond educational institutions that offer generic or non-career-oriented degrees, this artificial rise in educational demands benefits no one—not businesses, not employees, nor the broader economy. Instead of facilitating young Canadians' attainment of financial stability, opportunities for starting families, or prospects for entrepreneurial endeavors, this trend perpetuates negative consequences that can span generations, impacting productivity, social mobility, and wealth distribution.

Credential inflation has evolved into a substantial barrier affecting a significant portion of the Canadian population. Possessing a higher education degree no longer guarantees a straightforward path to a middle-class lifestyle. This is evidenced by the growing number of university-educated individuals seeking assistance from Toronto's Daily Bread Food Bank. Recent survey results at the Food Bank reveal that 46 percent of respondents hold a university degree or diploma, with an additional nine percent possessing a graduate or professional degree. Furthermore, this issue extends its reach into the skilled trades sector, leading to an increased demand for assessments, licenses, and bureaucratic paperwork. Moreover, newcomers to Canada, who have led to believe they were invited based on their educational qualifications, are met with the surprise that their perfectly valid credentials are devalued, and that they are racialized right from the get-go. They are forced to undergo reeducation, testing, and licensing processes. This places newcomers at risk of financial drain even before they can establish themselves in the job market with dignity, and economic disenfranchisement that exacerbates the challenges faced by them.

Below is a sortable table of overqualification percentages for undergraduates below the age of thirty-five, from a 2017 Statistics Canada study.

Subject	Women	Men
Arts	26.3	24.9
Biology	18.8	21.5
Business and administration	19.9	21.8
Information science and computer science	8.2	5.8
Education and teaching	6.2	8.0
Engineering	5.6	4.9
General and integrated sciences	21.0	22.2
Humanities	28.8	32.5
Mathematics and related studies	15.2	11.5
Nursing	1.9	3.5
Physics and chemistry	17.8	14.7
Social science and the behavioural sciences	24.6	28.7

A 2017 study from Statistics Canada showed that, for women under the age of 35, the median annual pay of undergraduates ranged from $41,238 in the arts to $75,027 in nursing. For men, the figures ranged from $44,327 in the arts to $78,054 in engineering.

A 2017 study from Statistics Canada showed that, among men over the age of 24, the median annual pay of apprenticeship holders is $72,955 per year, which is 7% more than they would have received with a typical college diploma. Among women, the figure is $38,230, which is actually 12% less than if they had started work straight out of high school. This discrepancy is explained by the tendency for men to seek training in engineering-related trades, while women often seek training in service trades such as hairstyling. Four years after certification, median employment incomes for individual trades range from $21,000 for hairdressers to $107,220 for heavy equipment technicians.

A 2018 study from Statistics Canada found that median earnings for women with master's degrees range from $65,200 in the arts to $124,200 in the pharmacy field. For men, the figures range from $69,700 in the humanities to $138,200 in the pharmacy field. Fully one-quarter of all master's degrees are in business subjects, where they typically result in a 27% pay increase compared to bachelor's degrees. In health, education, the arts and the social sciences, the median increase is in the 14% to 17% range. In the STEM subjects, the increase is less than 10%. Finally, three out of five doctoral degrees are awarded in the STEM subjects.

A 2020 Study from Statistics Canada found that most top-earners among bachelor's degree graduates came from various engineering specialties: 6 of the top 10 disciplines among men, and 7 of the top 10 disciplines among women were in engineering. At the master's degree level, most top-earning graduates came from business programs. Doctoral graduates who received the highest pay graduated from various program areas such as business, health, engineering, social sciences, and education. At both the bachelor's and master's degree levels, the most fields associated with the lowest pay were in the arts or humanities. At the doctoral level, biology had the lowest pay rates.

=== Cash cow programs ===
Canada began offering higher education to international students in the early 2000s. By the late 2010s, the structure and services of higher education institutions increasingly shifted from a public service model to a customer-oriented approach. One major reason for this change is the consistent underfunding of universities by the government since the early 1980s, with no significant adjustments made to account for inflation.

The Canadian government's policy of tying open work permits and the possibility of transitioning to permanent residency to international student status has influenced higher education institutions and provincial quality assurance systems, blurring associated and interrelated boundaries. These institutions became silent partners in creating new programs or converting existing ones into what are often referred to as "cash cow programs." These programs aim to attract international students by offering courses that appear proficient but primarily consist of basic content that doesn't provide job skills, serving mainly as check-the-box courses for accreditation and generic courses that are less expensive to run. A common identifying characteristic of these programs is that courses, particularly those with high enrolment of international students, are often taught by contract tutors who lack the engagement and quality of responsible and empowering faculty. Consequently, students who enrol in cash cow programs earn degrees that have little value in the local and national job market or require years of study and significant financial investment to attain a modicum of value due to the bloated nature of such programs, leading them to become less-desirable migrant workers in the transatlantic job market, associated with the concept described by Western academics as "designer migrants" based on market value.

Cash cow programs targeting international students are often expensive, leading to repeated calls for fairness from students who argue that tuition hikes are unjustified. In 2023, Alan Shepard, President of Western University, explained the reason behind higher tuition for international students: "If you're a domestic student — an Ontario student or a Canadian student — the government gives us funding to help with your education, and they effectively subsidize it. And for international students, that number is zero. So international tuition is definitely going to be higher." He added that this trend is consistent with similar institutions in other English-speaking countries, and hence it's predictable for international students. According to Shepard, there is competition among premier institutions regarding how much they can charge, which has become the new normal in higher education.

== See also ==
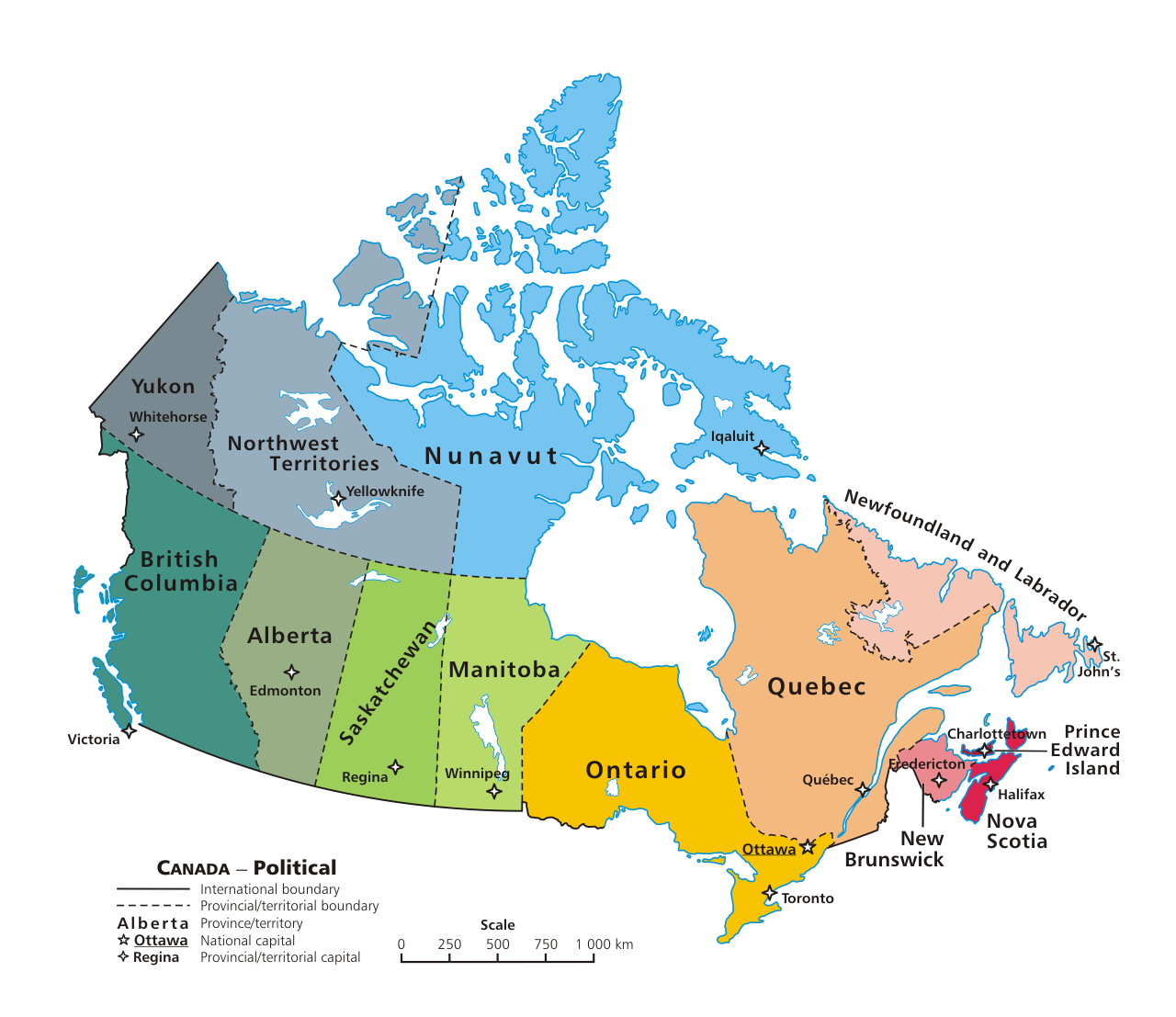
Higher education by provinces
- Academic ranks in Canada
- Rankings of universities in Canada
- Education in Canada
- Structural unemployment
- List of universities in Canada
- List of private universities in Canada
- List of colleges in Canada
- List of medical schools in Canada
- List of law schools in Canada
- List of business schools in Canada
- List of Canadian universities by endowment
