= Academic Matters =

Canadian magazine

Academic Matters: OCUFA's Journal of Higher Education
- Editor-in-chief: Ben Lewis
- Former editors: Graeme Stewart, Mark Rosenfeld
- Categories: Higher education
- Circulation: 17,000
- Publisher: Ontario Confederation of University Faculty Associations
- First issue: November 2005
- Country: Canada
- Language: English
- Website: academicmatters.ca
- ISSN: 1719-010X
- OCLC: 609706261

Academic Matters: The Journal of Higher Education is a Canadian magazine which publishes articles on issues of relevance to postsecondary education in Canada and internationally, as well as literature and film reviews, original fiction, research notes and commentaries. The magazine's mandate is to be a forum for original, thoughtful and engaging discussion of current trends in higher education and consideration of academe's future direction.

== History ==
Academic Matters was launched in November 2005 to fill a critical need in the Canadian media coverage of universities. The idea for the magazine came from the recognition that while universities are influential in many ways, there was no independent Canadian journal that examined university issues in a serious but accessible and visually engaging manner for both academics and the general public.

Published by the Ontario Confederation of University Faculty Associations, Academic Matters has a circulation of 17,000 readers, including professors, academic librarians and others interested in higher education issues across Canada. The magazine's editorial board consists of highly regarded academics and journalists who have worked at The Globe and Mail, Canadian Broadcasting Centre, National Film Board of Canada, and The New York Times.

A bi-annual publication, the thematic issues of Academic Matters have included the education "arms race" and public perceptions of higher education; "Generation Next" – the new wave of faculty now entering universities; threats to academic freedom in Canada, the United States, United Kingdom and Australia; the impact of technology on universities; and diversity and equity on university campuses.

Articles in Academic Matters have been picked up by media in both the United States and Canada, including The Chronicle of Higher Education, The Globe and Mail, National Post, and Toronto Star.

== Contributors ==
Academics, journalists and novelists who have contributed to Academic Matters include Michael Ignatieff, Carl Wieman, Camilla Gibb, David Foot, George Elliott Clarke, Richard Lipsey, Lee Gowan, Kim Echlin, Eric Wright, Judy Rebick, David Suzuki, and Mark Kingwell.

== See also ==
- Academic journals
- Education in Canada
- Higher education in Canada
- List of universities in Canada
- List of colleges in Canada
- Ontario rubric
