= List of private universities in Canada =

Private universities in Canada are independent postsecondary institutions that have been granted the authority to confer academic degrees from a provincial authority. The oldest private universities in Canada operated as seminaries or as religiously-affiliated institutions, although several secular for-profit and not-for-profit private universities were established in Canada during the late-20th and early 21st century. Although private universities have been established in several Canadian provinces, the majority of universities in the country remains publicly-funded.

Along with private universities based in Canada, several private universities based in the United States also operate satellite campuses in the provinces of Alberta, British Columbia, and Ontario.

== List by province ==
=== Alberta ===
Post-secondary degree programs at private universities in Alberta are approved by the province's Minister of Advanced Education as reviewed by the Campus Alberta Quality Council. The following are private universities based in Alberta that operate degree programs approved by Alberta's Minister of Advanced Education:

| Name | City | Language | Established (Note: The following year was when the institution was established, not when the institution became a university with the authority to confer academic degrees.) | Religious affiliation |
|---|---|---|---|---|
| Ambrose University | Calgary | English | 1921 | Christian and Missionary Alliance & Church of the Nazarene |
| Burman University | Lacombe | English | 1907 | Seventh-day Adventist |
| Concordia University of Edmonton | Edmonton | English | 1921 | —N/a (Note: Concordia University of Edmonton was formerly affiliated with Lutheran Church–Canada until 2016, when the university ended its affiliation and became a secular institution.) |
| St. Mary's University | Calgary | English | 1986 | Catholic Church |
| The King's University | Edmonton | English | 1979 | Christian Reformed Church in North America |

In addition to private universities that are based in Alberta, the cities of Calgary and Edmonton also hosts satellite campuses for private universities based in the United States, including the City University of Seattle, Gonzaga University, and the University of Portland. Degree programs offered at these satellite campuses are approved by Alberta's Minister of Advanced Education.

From 2002 to 2009, the Taylor University College and Seminary was authorized to confer undergraduate degrees. In 2009 the institution ceased operating an undergraduate program, and its authority to confer degrees was rescinded by the government of Alberta.

=== British Columbia ===
Post-secondary degree programs at private universities in British Columbia are authorized under the provincial Degree Authorization Act. The following are private universities based in British Columbia, whose degree-granting authority was authorized under the Degree Authorization Act:

| Name | City | Language | Established | Religious affiliation |
|---|---|---|---|---|
| Pacific Coast University for Workplace Health Sciences | Port Alberni | English | 2007 | —N/a |
| Trinity Western University | Langley | English | 1962 | Evangelical Free Church of America |
| University Canada West | Vancouver | English | 2005 | —N/a |
| Acsenda School of Management | Vancouver | English | 2004 | —N/a |
| Yorkville University | Vancouver (Note: Yorkville University operates multiple campuses in British Columbia, Ontario, and New Brunswick.) | English | 2017 (Note: The following year was when Yorkville University's Vancouver campus was opened to the public. However, the university has operated as an online university based in New Brunswick since 2003.) | —N/a |

In addition to private universities based in British Columbia, several US-based private universities also operate a satellite campus in Vancouver; including Adler University, City University of Seattle, Fairleigh Dickinson University, and Northeastern University. Gonzaga University also operates a satellite campus in Kelowna. The aforementioned universities that operate satellite campuses in British Columbia all operate degree programs authorized under the province's Degree Authorization Act.

=== Manitoba ===
There exists several religious-affiliated private universities in Manitoba that operate degree programs approved by the provincial government. The following Manitoba-based private universities are provided the authority to accept international students under the province's International Education Act:

| Name | City | Language | Established | Religious affiliation |
|---|---|---|---|---|
| Booth University College | Winnipeg | English | 1982 | Salvation Army |
| Canadian Mennonite University | Winnipeg | English | 1999 | Mennonite |
| Providence University College and Theological Seminary | Otterburne | English | 1925 | Evangelicalism |

=== New Brunswick ===
There exists several private universities in New Brunswick which are either recognized under the province's Degree Granting Act, or as a privately chartered university. They include:

| Name | City | Language | Established | Religious affiliation |
|---|---|---|---|---|
| Crandall University | Moncton | English | 1949 | Canadian Baptists of Atlantic Canada |
| Kingswood University | Sussex | English | 1945 | Wesleyan Church |
| St. Stephen's University | St. Stephen | English | 1975 | non-denominational Christian |
| University of Fredericton | Fredericton | English | 2005 | —N/a |
| Yorkville University | Fredericton | English | 2003 | —N/a |

Lansbridge University was a former private university in New Brunswick that ceased operations in 2010.

=== Ontario ===
Private universities based in Ontario have partial degree-granting authority as authorized by an act of the Legislative Assembly of Ontario. The majority of these institutions are faith-based. The following are private universities based in Ontario, that were authorized to grant degrees in Ontario through ministerial consent:

| Name | City | Language | Established | Religious affiliation |
|---|---|---|---|---|
| International Business University | Toronto | English | 2021 | —N/a |
| Redeemer University | Hamilton | English | 1982 | Reformed Christian |
| Tyndale University | Toronto | English | 1894 | Evangelicalism |
| University of Niagara Falls Canada | Niagara Falls | English | 2024 | —N/a |
| Yorkville University | Toronto, Vaughan | English | (Note: Yorkville University's was established in New Brunswick in 2003. However, the university did not establish a campus in Ontario, or receive ministerial consent to confer degrees in the province until a later date.) | —N/a |

In addition to private universities based in Ontario, the province also hosts satellite campuses for two US-based private universities, Niagara University and Northeastern University; the former in Vaughan and the latter in Toronto. These institutions were granted the authority to confer academic degrees through ministerial consent.

== See also ==
- Higher education in Canada
- Private education in Canada
- List of colleges in Canada
- List of universities in Canada
