= Kingston College (British Columbia) =

Canadian for-profit college

- Type: Private / Closed (2006)
- President: Michael Lo ...
- Location: Burnaby, British Columbia (headquarters): Markham, Ontario; Niagara Falls, Ontario

Kingston College, was an educational institution headquartered in Burnaby, British Columbia, Canada with locations in Toronto, Ontario and Niagara Falls, Ontario that was ordered closed in October 2006. Before its closure by provincial authorities, it had been a private, for-profit college operating in the Vancouver area by businessman Michael Lo under Kingston Education Group that runs Kingston High School, Lansbridge University in New Brunswick and British Columbia and Nanjing Grand Canadian Academy (formerly known as Greenwood Academy under the former Liberal MP, Raymond Chan).

Kingston College offered business degree from the American University in London. The AUL's business education programs have been accredited in the past by the International Assembly for Collegiate Business Education (IACBE), but this accreditation was suspended in April 2007. The Private Post-Secondary Education Commission of British Columbia (PPSEC) made several attempts to get Kingston to cease this practice before the PPSEC was disbanded in 2004 and replaced with Private Career Training Agency of British Columbia (PCTIA). Under PCTIA directives, any out of country institution offering degree programs in Canada should be accredited.

Though Kingston was advised by PPSEC in 2000, 2001, and 2004, they continued to have articulation with this university after successfully appealed with PPSEC for reinstatement.

Students are suing the college over advertising claims.

According to PCTIA Feb and April 2007 Board minutes, the college has submitted an appeal.

At the time of filing complaints Kingston had additional locations in Ontario in Markham and Niagara Falls.

== Notable alumni ==
- William J. Bruce III

== See also ==
- Lansbridge University
