= Lansbridge University =

Private university in New Brunswick, Canada

- Motto: Professional. Personal. Possible.
- Type: Private, for-profit
- Active: 1991–2018
- Academic affiliations: DETC
- President: Daryl Lisson
- Location: New Brunswick, Canada; 45.9621°N 66.6434°W (Fredericton office)
- Campus: Online
- Colours: White and green

Lansbridge University was an accredited private, for-profit distance education university with offices in Fredericton, New Brunswick, and formerly in British Columbia. Lansbridge University was a degree granting research university in Canada that offered doctoral degrees (doctorate) e.g. Doctor of Business Administration (DBA), Doctor of Philosophy (PhD), Master of Business Administration (MBA), master's degrees and undergraduate degrees by distance learning and on-campus.

== Lansbridge NB ==
Founded in 1991 by Learnsoft Corporation (which was later purchased by Kingston Education Group in 2001), the university provided online graduate-level education. Though owned by the same parent company, Lansbridge University is "a distinct legal entity and separately regulated from LUC Education (BC)".

Based out of Fredericton, New Brunswick, the university offered MBA, DBA, and Executive level MBA/DBA programs, taught by a faculty of graduate-level professors. The university was granted national accreditation in the United States in 2005 by the Distance Education and Training Council (DETC), which tailored in particular to US military personnel; active duty, guard and reserve-component, civilian military employees, military retirees, their eligible family members and military veterans.

On August 20, 2010, Lansbridge received the result of a protracted government review of their institution and that under the Degree Granting Act of the Province of New Brunswick, Lansbridge University can no longer grant MBA, DBA or Executive programs. This came as a result failing the province's board that reviews all universities.

According to the Maritime Provinces Higher Education Commission, the MBA, PhD and other degrees awarded by Lansbridge University prior to December 31, 2010, are fully recognized and supported by the New Brunswick Department of Post-Secondary Education, Training and Labour.

== Lansbridge BC ==
Lansbridge University - British Columbia, was authorized by BC Degree Authorization Act, and run by the Kingston Education Group. It was ordered closed by the BC Government, after an investigation by a hired lawyer (independent inspector) for false advertising and financial irregularities. An independent inspector found the BC University to be in breach of violations set out by the Degree Quality Assessment Board of BC. The Minister withdrew consent, and the university was closed in BC.

On July 22, 2010 - The B.C. Supreme Court certified the lawsuit, in response to an application from former student Joseph Brahmana. In addition to the lawsuit, in late 2010, a group of former Lansbridge students threatened additional legal action against Lansbridge for having failed to return their money after they had paid tuition, registration and other fees before the university closed. As of February 2011, a webpage on the social networking site Facebook was actively seeking information from former students who may have suffered a loss, especially those who completed an MBA, DBA or executive degree programs prior to the university's closure with no way of getting their diplomas or transcripts. Additionally, former students complained of not being able to get duplicate transcripts. The group sought former students for potential recruitment as additional plaintiffs in a possible class-action lawsuit against the university.

On average throughout the years of operation of Lansbridge, approximately 65% of its students were US citizens, many of whom were active and reserve-component military personnel, retirees, veterans or civilian military employees seeking distance learning degrees at Lansbridge because of the accreditation by the DETC.
