= Alberta Council on Admissions and Transfer =

The Alberta Council on Admissions and Transfer (ACAT) is an independent body created in 1974 to facilitate transfer agreements between the various post-secondary institutions in Alberta. Alberta was the first province to develop a standard procedure for this process.

The need for ACAT grew particularly in response to the complex situation of students who had attended colleges and wished to transfer their credits in order to attend a university. ACAT facilitates the required negotiations between all stakeholders, and maintains a database of the articulated courses. In 2000 the council initiated a process to develop a common grading system for Alberta universities.

The ACAT course database is accessible to students through its website, and the council has also made an app available.
