= David Foot =

Canadian economist and demographer

Academic background
- Education: University of Western Australia, Harvard University
- Website: Information at IDEAS / RePEc

David K. Foot is a Canadian economist and demographer. Foot did his undergraduate work at the University of Western Australia and his graduate work in economics at Harvard University, where he was supervised by Martin Feldstein. Following his PhD, he joined the department of economics at the University of Toronto.

== Economic demographics ==
After some early works on macroeconometrics, Foot turned his attention to economic demography. His research focuses on the impact of demographics on economics, especially as pertaining to the aging of the baby boomers. He argues that demographic shifts tend to have important social and economic consequences that are often neglected by policy makers, including aspects such as the changing patterns in crime, leisure activities and school enrollment. In his own words, demographics explains "two-thirds of everything".

A non-technical summary of his research on Canadian demographics was presented in his 1996 book Boom Bust & Echo: How to Profit from the Coming Demographic Shift, co-authored with journalist Daniel Stoffman. The book went on to become a Canadian national bestseller, and Foot has taken an active role in debates concerning Canadian public policies.

== Selected readings ==
- David K. Foot, "Population Aging", in A Canadian Priorities Agenda: Policy Choices to Improve Economics and Social Well-Being (edited by J. Leonard, C. Ragan and F. St.-Hilaire), Institute for Research on Public Policy, Montreal, 2007, 181–213.
- David K. Foot, "Tourism and Education in Western Europe: A Demographic Perspective", in Time shift, Leisure and Tourism: Importance of Time Allocation on Successful Products and Services (edited by K. Weiermair, H. Pechlaner and T. Bieger), Berlin, Eric Schmidt Verlag, 2006, 31–48.
- David K. Foot, "Easter Island: A Case Study in Non- Sustainability", Greener Management International 48 (2005), 11–20.
- David K. Foot and R. Gomez, "Age Structure, Income Distribution and Economic Growth", Canadian Public Policy 29 (2003), S141–61.
- David K. Foot and D. Stoffman, Boom Bust & Echo: Profiting from the Demographic Shift in the 21st Century, Stoddart, Toronto, (313 pages), 2001.
