= Ontario Confederation of University Faculty Associations =

- Abbreviation: OCUFA
- Formation: 1964
- Location: Toronto, Ontario, Canada
- President: Prof. Gyllian Phillips
- Website: http://www.ocufa.on.ca
- Formerly called: Ontario Council of University Faculty Associations

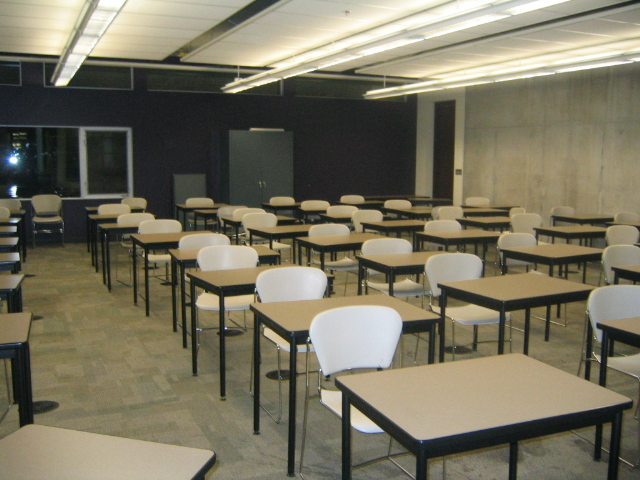
"OCUFA seeks to maintain and enhance the quality of higher education in Ontario"

The Ontario Confederation of University Faculty Associations (OCUFA) is a Canadian non-profit organization that represents 17,000 teachers, researchers, and librarians through its interaction with the Ontario government, opposition parties, related agencies, and associations. OCUFA assists its twenty-eight member faculty associations with the coordination of media relations and research for collective bargaining and provides its members with a discount program through Edvantage. OCUFA also publishes Academic Matters, a biannual journal that covers higher education topics across Canada, and a weekly electronic newsletter, OCUFA Report, with specific content for Ontario members.

== Background ==
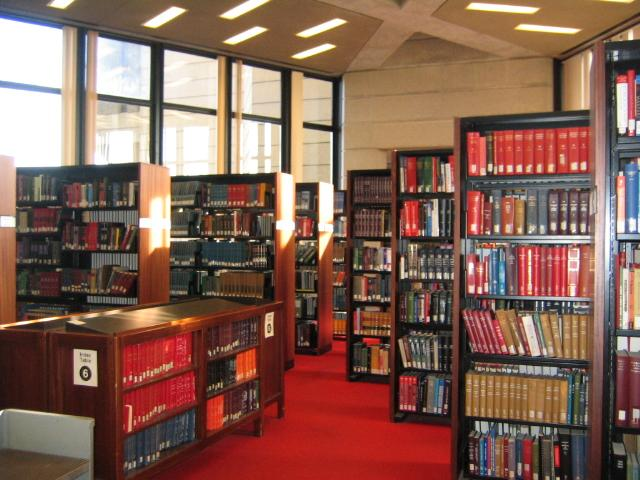
Library at the University of Toronto

Established in 1964, the mandate of OCUFA is to represent and express the views of academic staff at universities in Ontario in order to improve the quality of higher education in the province. The objectives include representing the interests of its members, advocacy regarding legislation and public policy affecting universities in Ontario, researching applicable areas, resolving differences between members, and information sharing (e.g., conferences). The board of directors maintains governs the organization while each member (i.e., faculty association) appoints one person to be a director to represent them on the board. OCUFA membership consists of twenty-eight faculty associations that represent every public university in Ontario.

== Publications ==
OCUFA launched its quarterly publication Academic Matters in 2005 to cover higher education topics with a Canadian focus. The journal has a circulation of 18,000 and includes contributions from academic and non-academic authors. In addition, OCUFA provides members with a weekly electronic newsletter in English and French, OCUFA Report, which covers postsecondary news and events in Ontario. OCUFA routinely publishes research briefs and reports on its website.

== Advocacy ==
OCUFA provides members with a lobbying resources and a forum through which they can coordinate campaigns on key issues. It maintains a website to communicate and coordinate advocacy issues with the public and related associations with similar interests. OCUFA conducts public opinion polls and gathers relevant poll data from other organizations to inform its members and the public. It routinely engages with the Government of Ontario to help inform its policy decisions.

== See also ==
- Academic Matters
- Higher education in Ontario
