= Academic grading in Canada =

Academic grading in Canada varies by province, level of education (e.g., elementary, secondary, tertiary), by institution, and faculty. The following are commonly used conversions from percentage grades to letter grades.

== Alberta ==
This is the system of grading used by many schools in Alberta.

| Letter | Percent | Ref. |
|---|---|---|
| A+ | 90–100% | |
| A | 85–89% | |
| A− | 80–84% | |
| B+ | 77–79% | |
| B | 73–76% | |
| B− | 70–72% | |
| C+ | 67–69% | |
| C | 63-66% | |
| C- | 60-62% | |
| D+ | 55–59% | |
| D | 50–54% | |
| F | 0–49% | |

== British Columbia ==
This is the system of grading used by many high schools in BC (Grades 10–12).

Grading scale for Grades 10–12
| Letter | Percent | Explanation |
|---|---|---|
| A | 86–100% | Excellent or outstanding |
| B | 73–85% | Very good |
| C+ | 67–72% | Good |
| C | 60–66% | Satisfactory |
| C- | 50–59% | Minimally acceptable |
| F | 0-49% | Failing |

Proficiency scale for Grades K–9
| Proficiency | Explanation |
|---|---|
| Extending | Student demonstrates an increased depth and complexity of concepts taught. |
| Proficient | Student demonstrates a complete understanding of concepts taught. |
| Developing | Student demonstrates a partial understanding of concepts taught. |
| Emerging | Student demonstrates an initial understanding of concepts taught. |
| IE | Insufficient evidence of learning (missing assignments) |

== Ontario ==
The grading standards for public elementary and secondary schools (including secular and separate; English and French first language schools) are set by the Ontario Ministry of Education and includes letter grades and percentages. In addition to letter grades and percentages, the Ministry of Education also uses a level system to mark its students. The four levels correspond to how students are marked on the Ontario rubric. The following is the levels on the Ontario rubric, its meaning, and its corresponding letter/percentage grades:

- Level 4, beyond government standards (A; 85 percent and above)
- Level 3, at government standards (B; 70–84 percent)
- Level 2, approaching government standards (C; 60–69 percent)
- Level 1, well below government standards (D; 50–59 percent)

The grading standards for A− letter grades changed in September 2010 to coincide with a new academic year. The new changes require a higher percentage grade by two or five points to obtain an A or A+ respectively.

| Letter | Level (Note: Some institutions may use +/− modifiers (Level 4+ or Level 4-) alongside levels, although formally, the Ministry's rubric does not include them.) | Percent (until August 2010) | Percent (since September 2010) |
|---|---|---|---|
| A+ | 4 | 90–100% | 95–100% (School grading system may vary) |
| A | 4 | 85–89% | 87–94% |
| A− | 4 | 80–84% | 80–86% |
| B+ | 3 | 77–79% | |
| B | 3 | 73–76% | |
| B− | 3 | 70–72% | |
| C+ | 2 | 67–69% | |
| C | 2 | 63–66% | |
| C− | 2 | 60–62% | |
| D+ | 1 | 57–59% | |
| D | 1 | 53–56% | |
| D− | 1 | 50–52%. | |
| F/R (Note: N/A or R is used in elementary schools, while F is used for some secondary schools.) | —N/a | 0–49% | |
| I (Note: Insufficient amount of information to be graded) | —N/a | —N/a | |

== Saskatchewan ==
| Letter | Percent | Ref. |
|---|---|---|
| A+ | 90–100% | |
| A | 80–89% | |
| B | 70–79% | |
| C | 60–69% | |
| D | 50–59% | |
| F | 0–49% | |

At a high school level in Saskatchewan, most subjects are separated into three competencies. On report cards, marks are normally shown as numbers and an average of the two marks associated with the subject will be calculated. For example, if a student achieves A, A− and B+ in a subject, teachers will calculate an average of the three marks (in this case, 85%).

== See also ==
- Education in Canada
